= Administrative divisions of Zaporizhzhia Oblast =

Political divisions in Ukraine

Zaporizhzhia Oblast is subdivided into districts (raions) which are subdivided into municipalities (hromadas).

== Current ==
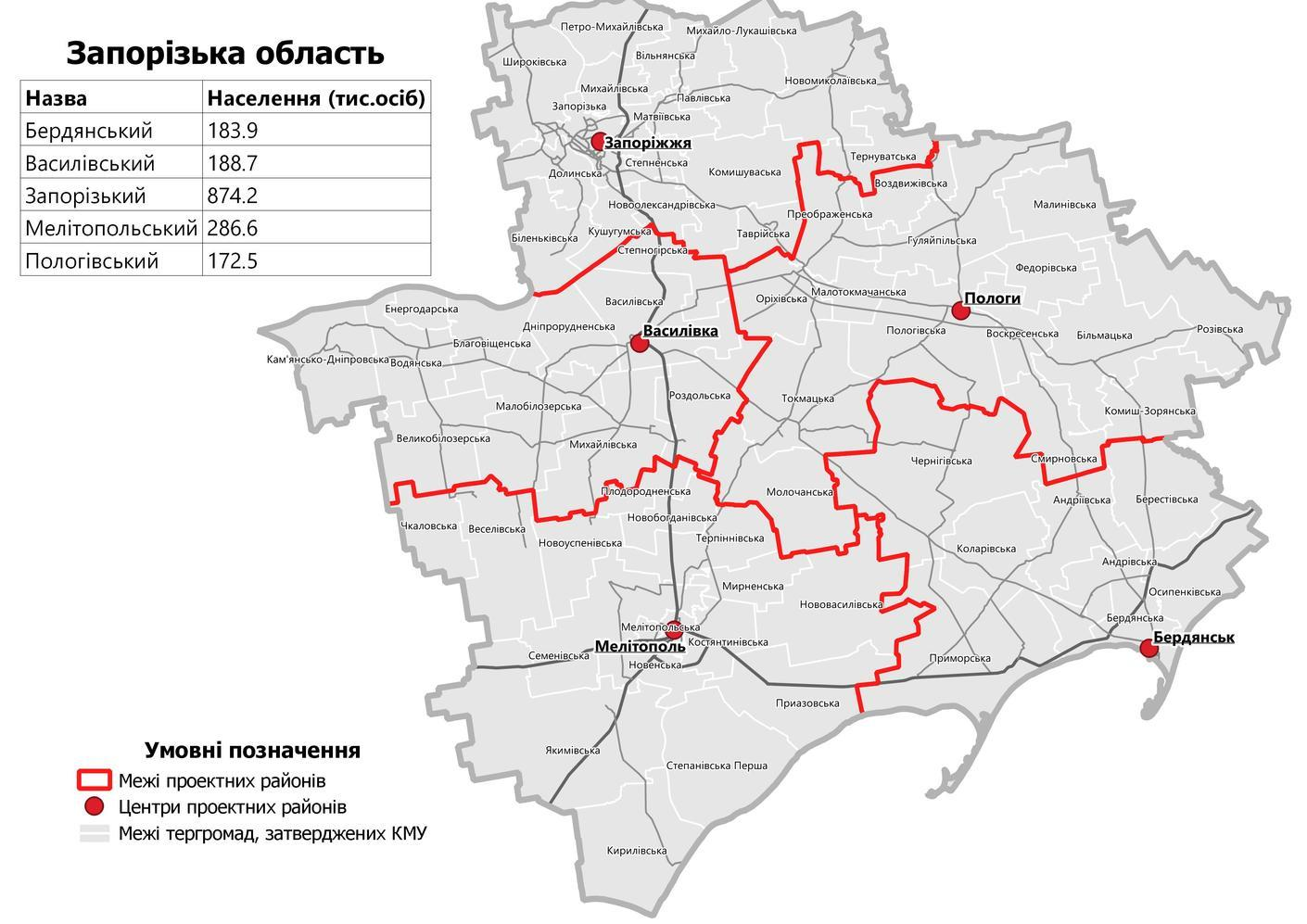
Raions of Zaporizhzhia Oblast as of August 2020.

On 18 July 2020, the number of districts was reduced to five. These are:

1. Berdiansk (Бердянський район), the center is in the town of Berdiansk;
2. Melitopol (Мелітопольський район), the center is in the town of Melitopol;
3. Polohy (Пологівський район), the center is in the town of Polohy;
4. Vasylivka (Василівський район), the center is in the town of Vasylivka;
5. Zaporizhzhia (Запорізький район), the center is in the city of Zaporizhzhia.

Zaporizhzhia Oblast
As of January 1, 2022
| Number of districts (raions) | 5 |
| Number of municipalities (hromadas) | 67 |

== Administrative divisions until 2020 ==
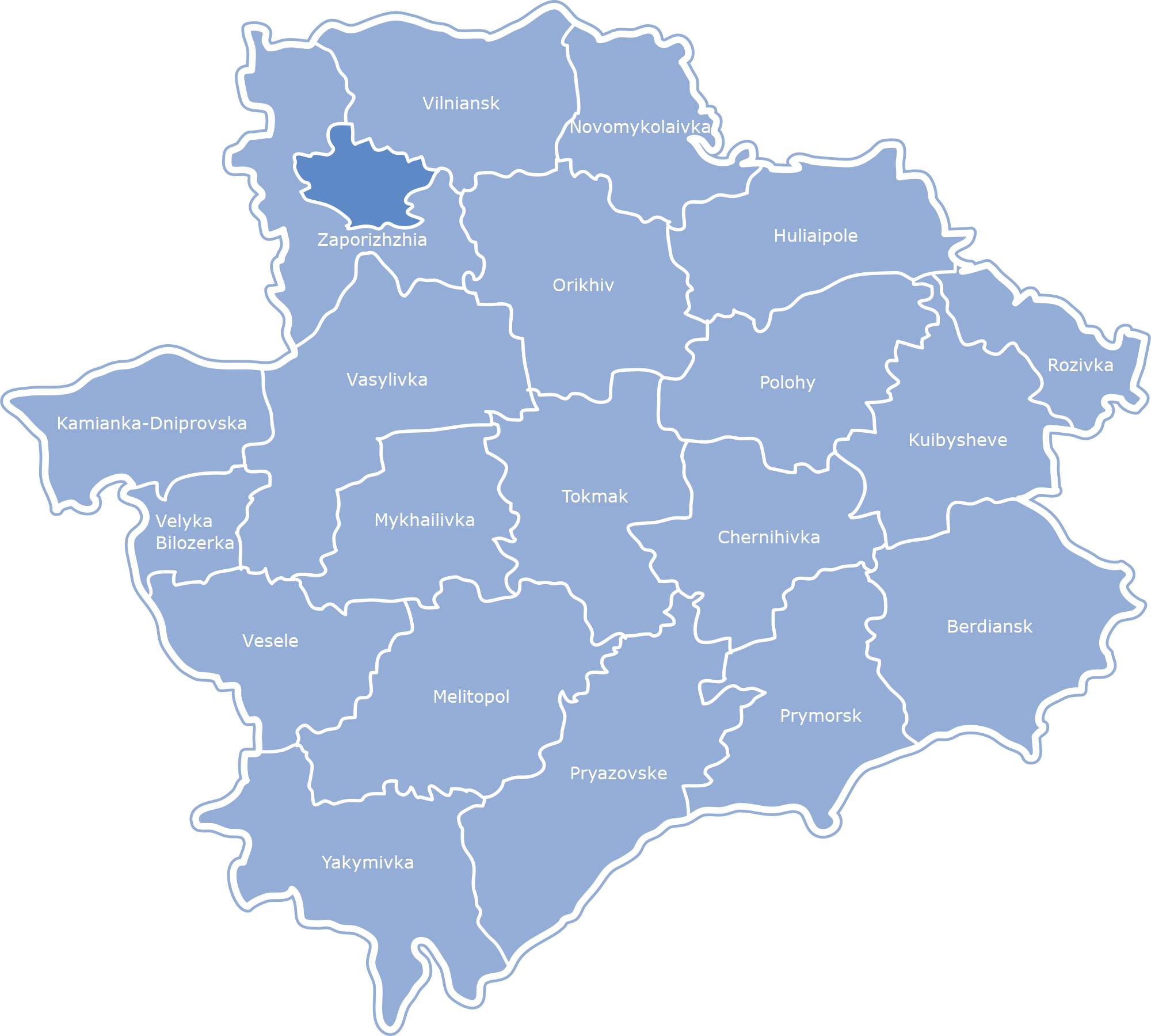
Former raions of Zaporizhzhia Oblast as of June 2020. The city of Zaporizhzhia is shown in dark blue.

In 2020, Zaporizhzhia Oblast was subdivided into 25 regions: 20 districts (raions) and 5 city municipalities (mis'krada or misto), officially known as territories governed by city councils.

| Name | Ukrainian name | Area (km^{2}) | Population census 2015 | Admin. center | Urban population only |
|---|---|---|---|---|---|
| Zaporizhzhia | Запоріжжя (місто) | 334 | 757,650 | Zaporizhzhia (city) | 757,650 |
| Berdiansk | Бердянськ (місто) | 83 | 117,492 | Berdiansk (city) | 114,401 |
| Enerhodar | Енергодар (місто) | 64 | 54,397 | Enerhodar (city) | 54,397 |
| Melitopol | Мелітополь (місто) | 51 | 156,022 | Melitopol (city) | 156,022 |
| Tokmak | Токмак (місто) | 33 | 32,209 | Tokmak (city) | 32,209 |
| Berdiansk Raion | Бердянський район | 1,776 | 25,533 | Berdiansk (city) | N/A * |
| Bilmak Raion | Більмацький район | 1,300 | 22,500 | Bilmak | 9,423 |
| Chernihivka Raion | Чернігівський район | 1,200 | 17,331 | Chernihivka | 5,994 |
| Huliaipole Raion | Гуляйпільський район | 1,300 | 27,067 | Huliaipole | 15,116 |
| Kamianka-Dniprovska Raion | Кам'янсько-Дніпровський район | 1,240 | 40,525 | Kamianka-Dniprovska | 13,223 |
| Melitopol Raion | Мелітопольський район | 1,780 | 49,724 | Melitopol (city) | N/A * |
| Mykhailivka Raion | Михайлівський район | 1,067 | 29,250 | Mykhailivka | 15,609 |
| Novomykolaivka Raion | Новомиколаївський район | 915 | 16,206 | Novomykolaivka | 6,764 |
| Orikhiv Raion | Оріхівський район | 1,590 | 46,239 | Orikhiv | 20,358 |
| Polohy Raion | Пологівський район | 1,340 | 40,576 | Polohy | 19,552 |
| Pryazovske Raion | Приазовський район | 1,947 | 27,636 | Pryazovske | 9,106 |
| Prymorsk Raion | Приморський район | 1,400 | 30,334 | Prymorsk | 12,085 |
| Rozivka Raion | Розівський район | 610 | 8,960 | Rozivka | 3,289 |
| Tokmak Raion | Токмацький район | 1,442 | 22,705 | Tokmak (city) | N/A * |
| Vasylivka Raion | Василівський район | 1,620 | 64,131 | Vasylivka | 37,232 |
| Velyka Bilozerka Raion | Великобілозерський район | 470 | 8,064 | Velyka Bilozerka | 6,124 |
| Vesele Raion | Веселівський район | 1,128 | 21,756 | Vesele | 10,042 |
| Vilniansk Raion | Вільнянський район | 1,280 | 47,572 | Vilniansk | 16,795 |
| Yakymivka Raion | Якимівський район | 1,850 | 33,942 | Yakymivka | 15,386 |
| Zaporizhzhia Raion | Запорізький район | 1,462 | 57,842 | Zaporizhzhia (city) | N/A * |

Note: Asterisks (*) Although the administrative center of the raion is in the city/town that it is named after, cities do not answer to the raion authorities (only towns do), but are directly subordinated to the oblast government and therefore are not counted as part of raion statistics.

- Cities under the oblast's jurisdiction:
  - Zaporizhzhia Municipality (Запоріжжя), the administrative center of the oblast
    - Cities and towns under the city's jurisdiction:
      - Zaporizhzhia
        - Urban districts under the city's jurisdiction:
          - Khortytskyi District
          - Komunarskyi District
          - Leninskyi District
          - Ordzhonikidzevskyi District
          - Shevchenkivskyi District
          - Zavodskyi District
          - Zhovtnevyi District
  - Berdiansk Municipality
    - Cities and towns under the city's jurisdiction:
      - Berdiansk (Бердянськ)
  - Enerhodar (Енергодар)
  - Melitopol (Мелітополь)
  - Tokmak (Токмак)
- Districts (raions):
  - Berdiansk (Бердянський район)
    - Urban-type settlements under the district's jurisdiction:
      - Andriivka (Андріївка)
  - Bilmak (Більмацький район), formerly Kuibysheve Raion
    - Urban-type settlements under the district's jurisdiction:
      - Bilmak (Більмак), formerly Kuibysheve, in 2021 renamed Kamianka
      - Komysh-Zoria (Комиш-Зоря)
  - Chernihivka (Чернігівський район)
    - Urban-type settlements under the district's jurisdiction:
      - Chernihivka (Чернігівка)
  - Huliaipole (Гуляйпільський район)
    - Cities and towns under the district's jurisdiction:
      - Huliaipole (Гуляйполе)
    - Urban-type settlements under the district's jurisdiction:
      - Zaliznychne (Залізничне)
  - Kamianka-Dniprovska (Кам'янсько-Дніпровський район)
    - Cities and towns under the district's jurisdiction:
      - Kamianka-Dniprovska (Кам'янка-Дніпровська)
  - Melitopol (Мелітопольський район)
    - Urban-type settlements under the district's jurisdiction:
      - Myrne (Мирне)
  - Mykhailivka (Михайлівський район)
    - Urban-type settlements under the district's jurisdiction:
      - Mykhailivka (Михайлівка)
      - Pryshyb (Пришиб)
  - Novomykolaivka (Новомиколаївський район)
    - Urban-type settlements under the district's jurisdiction:
      - Novomykolaivka (Новомиколаївка)
      - Ternuvate (Тернувате)
  - Orikhiv (Оріхівський район)
    - Cities and towns under the district's jurisdiction:
      - Orikhiv (Оріхів)
    - Urban-type settlements under the district's jurisdiction:
      - Komyshuvakha (Комишуваха)
  - Polohy (Пологівський район)
    - Cities and towns under the district's jurisdiction:
      - Polohy (Пологи)
  - Pryazovske (Приазовський район)
    - Urban-type settlements under the district's jurisdiction:
      - Novovasylivka (Нововасилівка)
      - Pryazovske (Приазовське)
  - Prymorsk (Приморський район)
    - Cities and towns under the district's jurisdiction:
      - Prymorsk (Приморськ)
  - Rozivka (Розівський район)
    - Urban-type settlements under the district's jurisdiction:
      - Rozivka (Розівка)
  - Tokmak (Токмацький район)
    - Cities and towns under the district's jurisdiction:
      - Molochansk (Молочанськ)
  - Vasylivka (Василівський район)
    - Cities and towns under the district's jurisdiction:
      - Dniprorudne (Дніпрорудне)
      - Vasylivka (Василівка)
    - Urban-type settlements under the district's jurisdiction:
      - Stepnohirsk (Степногірськ)
  - Velyka Bilozerka (Великобілозерський район)
  - Vesele (Веселівський район)
    - Urban-type settlements under the district's jurisdiction:
      - Vesele (Веселе)
  - Vilniansk (Вільнянський район)
    - Cities and towns under the district's jurisdiction:
      - Vilniansk (Вільнянськ)
    - Urban-type settlements under the district's jurisdiction:
      - Kamiane (Кам'яне)
  - Yakymivka (Якимівський район)
    - Urban-type settlements under the district's jurisdiction:
      - Kyrylivka (Кирилівка)
      - Yakymivka (Якимівка)
  - Zaporizhzhia (Запорізький район)
    - Urban-type settlements under the district's jurisdiction:
      - Balabyne (Балабине)
      - Kushuhum (Кушугум)
      - Malokaterynivka (Малокатеринівка)
