= Ukraine's 82nd electoral district =

No.82
- Single-mandate constituency
- Region: Zaporizhzhia Oblast
- Polling divisions: 176
- Population: 158,044 (2014)
- Major settlements: Huliaipole, Polohy, Vilniansk

Current single-mandate constituency
- Created: For the 1998 election
- Seats: 1 MP
- Election: 2019
MP elected
Maryna Nikitina
Servant of the People
- Party lists: Servant of the People, 54.66% Opposition Platform — For Life, 18.97% Fatherland, 5.05% Opposition Bloc, 3.85% Radical Party of Oleh Lyashko, 3.78%
- Turnout: 43.73%, 71,859 votes

The No.82 single-mandate constituency (Ukrainian: Одномандатний виборчий округ №82, Odnomandatnyi vyborchyi okruh №82), shortened to SMC No. 82 (Ukrainian: ОВО №82) is one of 225 electoral districts that elects a member of parliament (people's deputy) to the Verkhovna Rada, Ukraine's national parliament.

Ukraine's electoral system is based on the mixed-member proportional representation system, which stipulates that half of a countries MPs are elected from proportional party lists, with the other half elected from first-past-the-post constituencies. A constituency's votes for a political bloc or party is tallied up with the rest of the 224 constituencies to determine the results of the proportional representation voting.

== Location ==
The No.82 single-mandate constituency is located in the northern portion of Zaporizhzhia Oblast (province) in Ukraine, representing the Huliaipole Raion, Novomykolaivka Raion, part of Orikhiv Raion, Polohy Raion, Vilniansk Raion, Zaporizhzhia Raions (districts), including the cities of Huliaipole, Polohy, Vilniansk.
