= Sokolivka =

Sokolivka (Ukrainian: Соколівка) may refer to the following places in Ukraine:

== Cherkasy Oblast ==
- Sokolivka, Cherkasy Oblast, village in Uman Raion

== Chernihiv Oblast ==
- Sokolivka, Chernihiv Raion, Chernihiv Oblast, village in Chernihiv Raion
- Sokolivka, Nizhyn Raion, Chernihiv Oblast, village in Nizhyn Raion

== Dnipropetrovsk Oblast ==
- Sokolivka, Dnipropetrovsk Oblast, village in Kamianske Raion

== Ivano-Frankivsk Oblast ==
- Sokolivka, Ivano-Frankivsk Raion, Ivano-Frankivsk Oblast, village in Ivano-Frankivsk Raion
- Sokolivka, Kosiv Raion, Ivano-Frankivsk Oblast, village in Kosiv Raion

== Kharkiv Oblast ==
- Sokolivka, Kharkiv Oblast, village in Izium Raion

== Khmelnytskyi Oblast ==
- Sokolivka, Kamianets-Podilskyi Raion, Khmelnytskyi Oblast, village in Kamianets-Podilskyi Raion
- Sokolivka, Khmelnytskyi Raion, Khmelnytskyi Oblast, village in Khmelnytskyi Raion

== Kyiv Oblast ==
- Sokolivka, Kyiv Oblast, village in Bila Tserkva Raion

== Lviv Oblast ==
- Sokolivka, Bibrka urban hromada, Lviv Raion, Lviv Oblast, village in Bibrka urban hromada, Lviv Raion
- Sokolivka, Shchyrets settlement hromada, Lviv Raion, Lviv Oblast, village in Shchyrets settlement hromada, Lviv Raion
- Sokolivka, Zolochiv Raion, Lviv Oblast, village in Zolochiv Raion

== Mykolaiv Oblast ==
- Sokolivka, Bashtanka Raion, Mykolaiv Oblast, village in Bashtanka Raion
- Sokolivka, Pervomaisk Raion, Mykolaiv Oblast, village in Pervomaisk Raion
- Sokolivka, Voznesensk Raion, Mykolaiv Oblast, village in Voznesensk Raion

== Ternopil Oblast ==
- Sokolivka, Ternopil Oblast, village in Kremenets Raion

== Vinnytsia Oblast ==
- Sokolivka, Pohrebyshche Raion, Vinnytsia Oblast, former village in Pohrebyshche Raion
- Sokolivka, Tulchyn Raion, Vinnytsia Oblast, village in Kryzhopil settlement hromada, Tulchyn Raion
- Sokolivka, Vinnytsia Raion, Vinnytsia Oblast, village in Lityn settlement hromada, Vinnytsia Raion

== Zaporizhzhia Oblast ==
- Sokolivka, Zaporizhzhia Oblast, village in Zaporizhzhia Raion
