= Liudmyla Padalko =

Ukrainian doctor (born 1949)

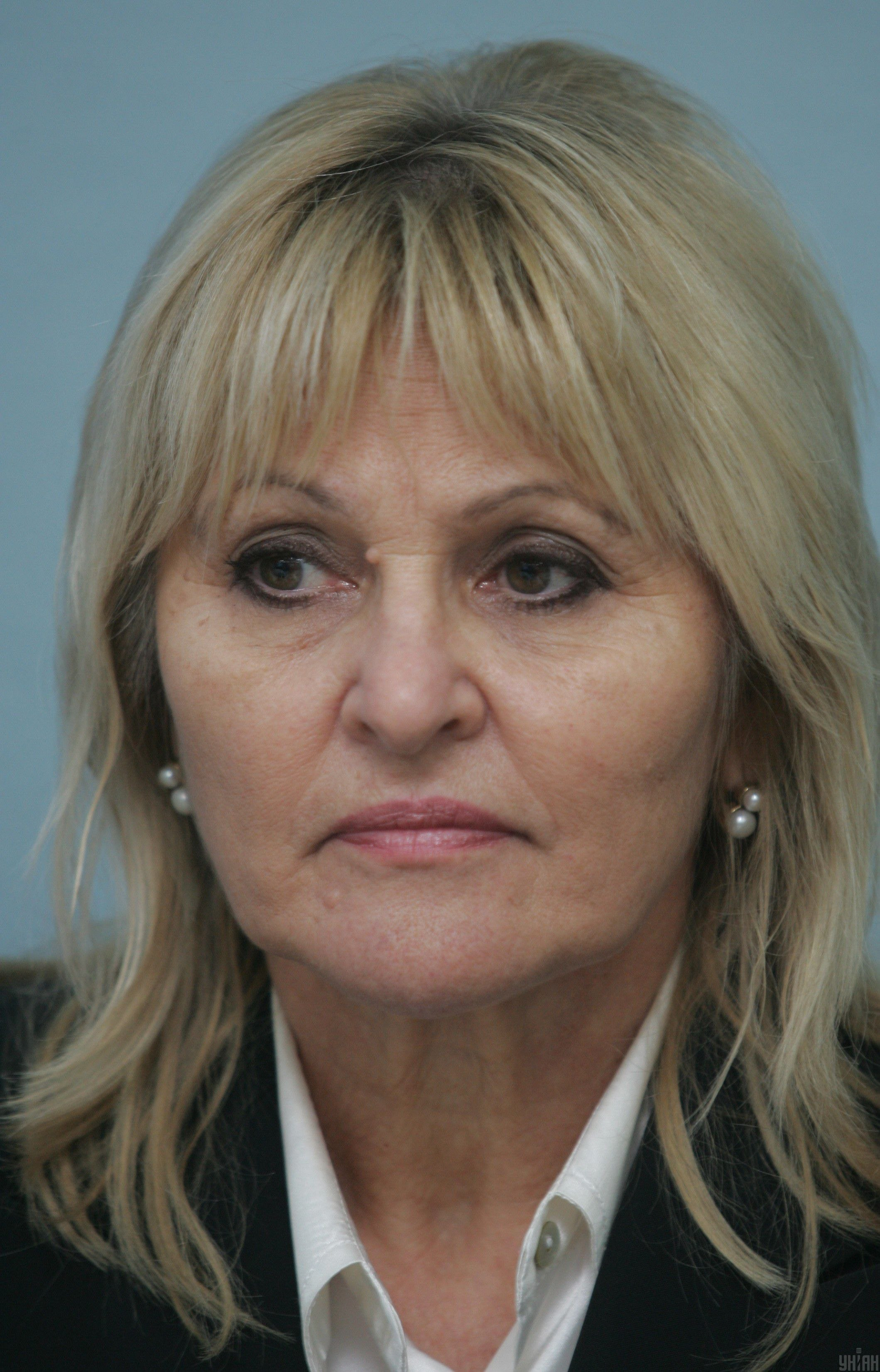
- Liudmyla Padalko in 2007
- Born: Liudmyla Kyi; 8 March 1949 (age 76); Tersianka, Novomykolaivka Raion, Zaporizhzhia Oblast
- Citizenship: Ukrainian
- Occupation: Obstetrician gynecologist
- Years active: 1973–present

Liudmyla Padalko (Ukrainian: Падалко Людмила Іванівна; born 8 March 1949) is a Ukrainian obstetrician-gynecologist who has held the position of chief doctor at the Regional Perinatal Center in Dnipro since 1990. She was honored with the title of Honored Doctor of Ukraine in 2001 and earned her Candidate of Medicine degree in 2002.

== Biography ==
Liudmyla Padalko, born Kyi, was born on March 8, 1949, in Tersyanka, Novomykolaivka Raion, Zaporizhzhia Oblast. Her father, Ivan Kyi, taught mathematics at the local school, while her mother, Halyna, managed a grocery store. In 1964–1965, Padalko moved with her parents and sister to the district center. She graduated from Novomykolaivka Secondary School with a gold medal in 1966.

In 1967, she began her medical studies at Voroshilovgrad Medical Institute and married Vadym Padalko in 1970. A year later, she transferred to Dnipropetrovsk, where her son was born in 1971. In 1973, she graduated from the medical institute with a specialization in general medicine and qualified as an obstetrician-gynecologist.

After medical school, she completed an internship at Dnipropetrovsk City Hospital No. 9, after which she began working as an obstetrician-gynecologist at Synelnykove Central Regional Hospital. Later, she was promoted to deputy chief physician for medical affairs.

In 1985, Padalko started working as an obstetrician-gynecologist at Dnipropetrovsk Regional Oncologic Dispensary. On 10 April 1990, she became the Chief Physician of Dnipropetrovsk City Maternity Hospital No. 2. On 26 June 2012, the hospital was reorganized into the Dnipropetrovsk Regional Perinatal Center, where she remained Chief Physician.

== Political activity ==
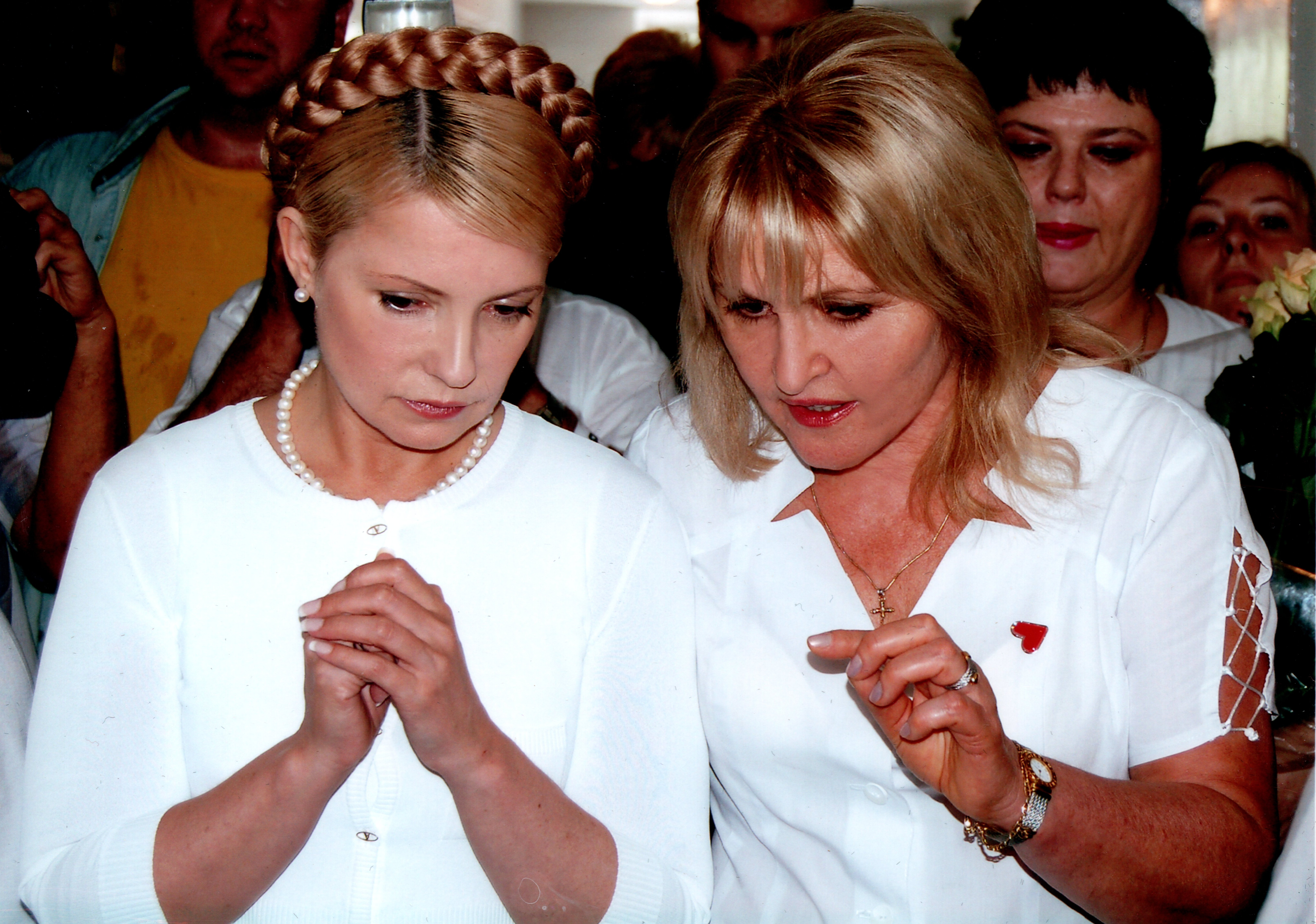
With Yulia Tymoshenko (2007)

In 1982, Padalko was first elected as a deputy in Synelnykove City Council. In 2002, she was elected a deputy in Dnipropetrovsk Oblast Council and stood as a candidate for parliament with the political party "Women for the Future".

In 2005, she joined All-Ukrainian Union "Fatherland", and in 2006, she was the second elected deputy to the Dnipropetrovsk Oblast Council. She was a member of the standing committee of the regional council on the issues of entrepreneurship, the processing industry, trade, and consumer services. In 2010, Padalko became a deputy to the regional council for the third time. In 2014, in the parliamentary elections, Padalko was on the No. 158 election list of the All-Ukrainian Union "Fatherland".

== As chief doctor ==
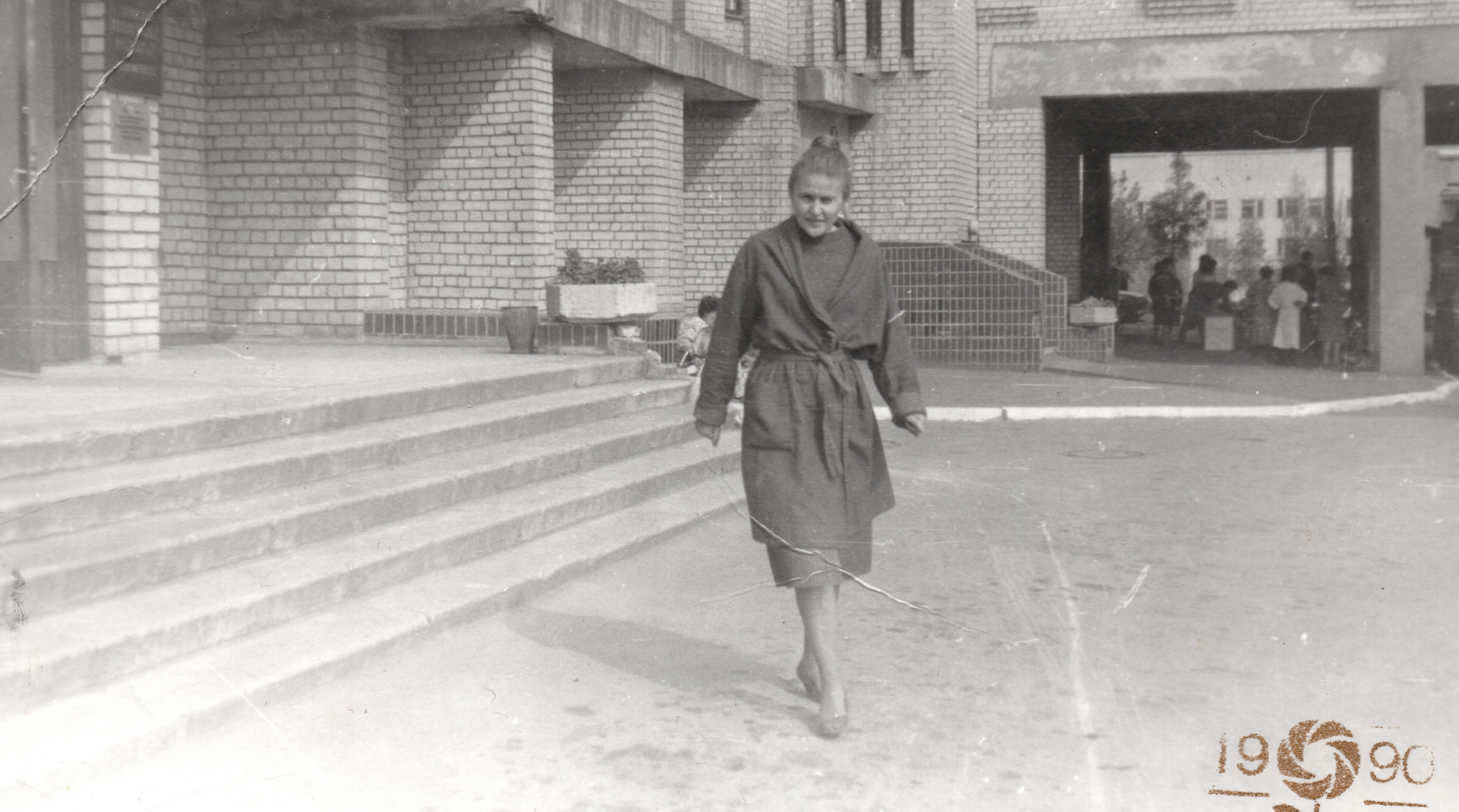
First day in 1990

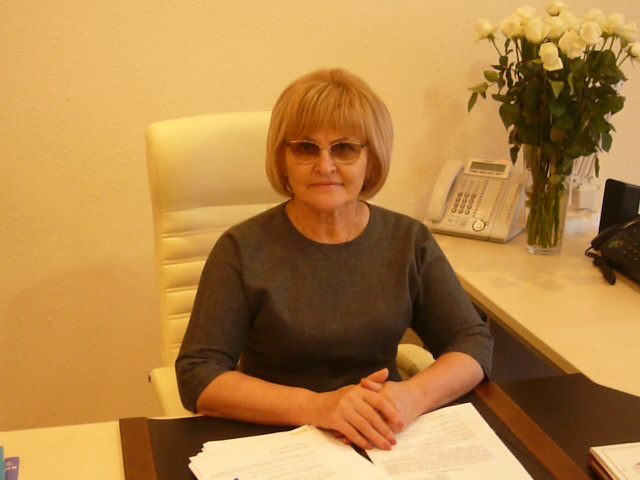
After 23 years (2013)

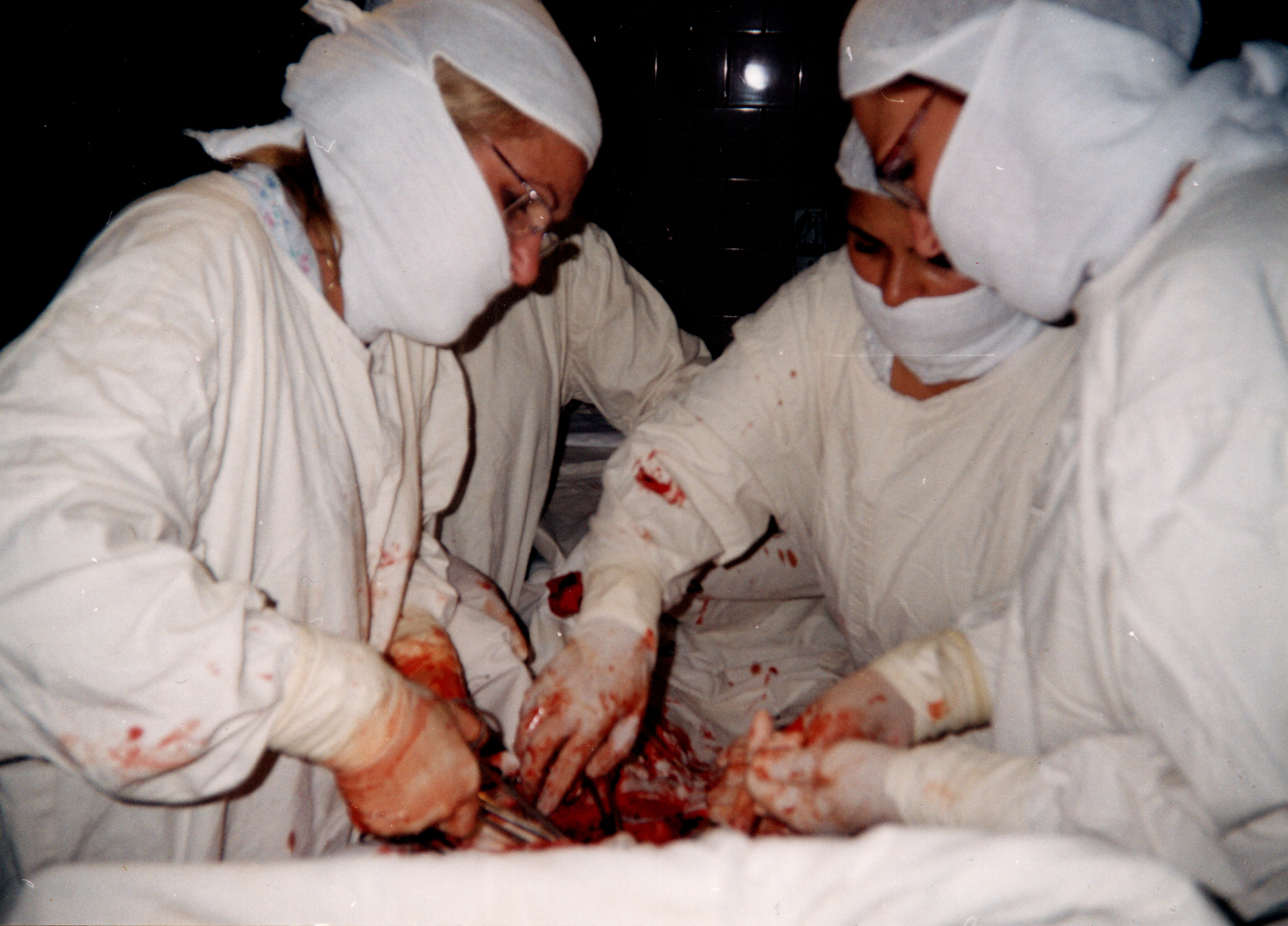
In work (2004)

During Padalko's tenure as Chief Physician, first at the maternity hospital and later at the Dnipropetrovsk Regional Perinatal Center, she assisted in 5,843 births (3,006 boys and 2,837 girls). Since the center’s opening, it has seen a total of 18,301 births. Padalko also performed over 4,000 gynecological surgeries and conducted personal examinations for more than 30,000 women.

Padalko and her assistance helped open a hyperbaric oxygen department in 1991. An anaesthesiology and intensive care department were opened in 1993. In 1998, the centre for women with disabilities was opened. In 2000, the centre for pediatric and adolescent gynecology and the centre for juvenile obstetrics was opened. In 2006, the breastfeeding support centre was opened. In 2015, an organisational and methodological department with a telehealth cabinet was opened.

In 1989, at the maternity hospital, the Department of Obstetrics, Gynecology, and Perinatology of the Faculty of Postgraduate Education at Dnipropetrovsk State Medical Academy was established at the initiative of Zinaida Dubossarska. Padalko continued to develop the department, which was supported by Rector Liudmyla Novitska-Usenko.The department's staff conducts medical consultations and advisory work for women and newborns through clinical rounds, consultations, and surgeries.

== Research activities ==
During her career, Padalko has authored several scientific papers. Some of them are:

- Беременность, роды и состояние фетоплацентарной системы у женщин, перенесших кесарево сечение // Збірник наукових праць Асоціації акушерів-гінекологів України. (1998) С. 106–108.
- Досвід реабілітації генеративної функції хворих із запаленням додатків матки // Актуальні проблеми післядипломної освіти. (1998) С. 41.
- Оцінка ефективності та проблеми акушерської допомоги юним та літнім першовагітнім // Педіатрія, акушерство та гінекологія. (1999) No. 2, С. 83–86.
- Особливості перебігу вагітності та пологів у юних першородящих при урогенітальному хламідіозі // Педіатрія, акушерство та гінекологія. (1999) No. 2, С. 90–92.
- Психовегетотативные предикторы позднего гестоза у юних первородящих // Збірник наукових праць асоціації акушерів-гінекологів України. (2000) С. 235–237.
- Проблема спайкообразования в гинекологической практике // Збірник наукових праць Асоціації акушерів-гінекологів України. (2012) С. 167–169.

== Awards and honors ==
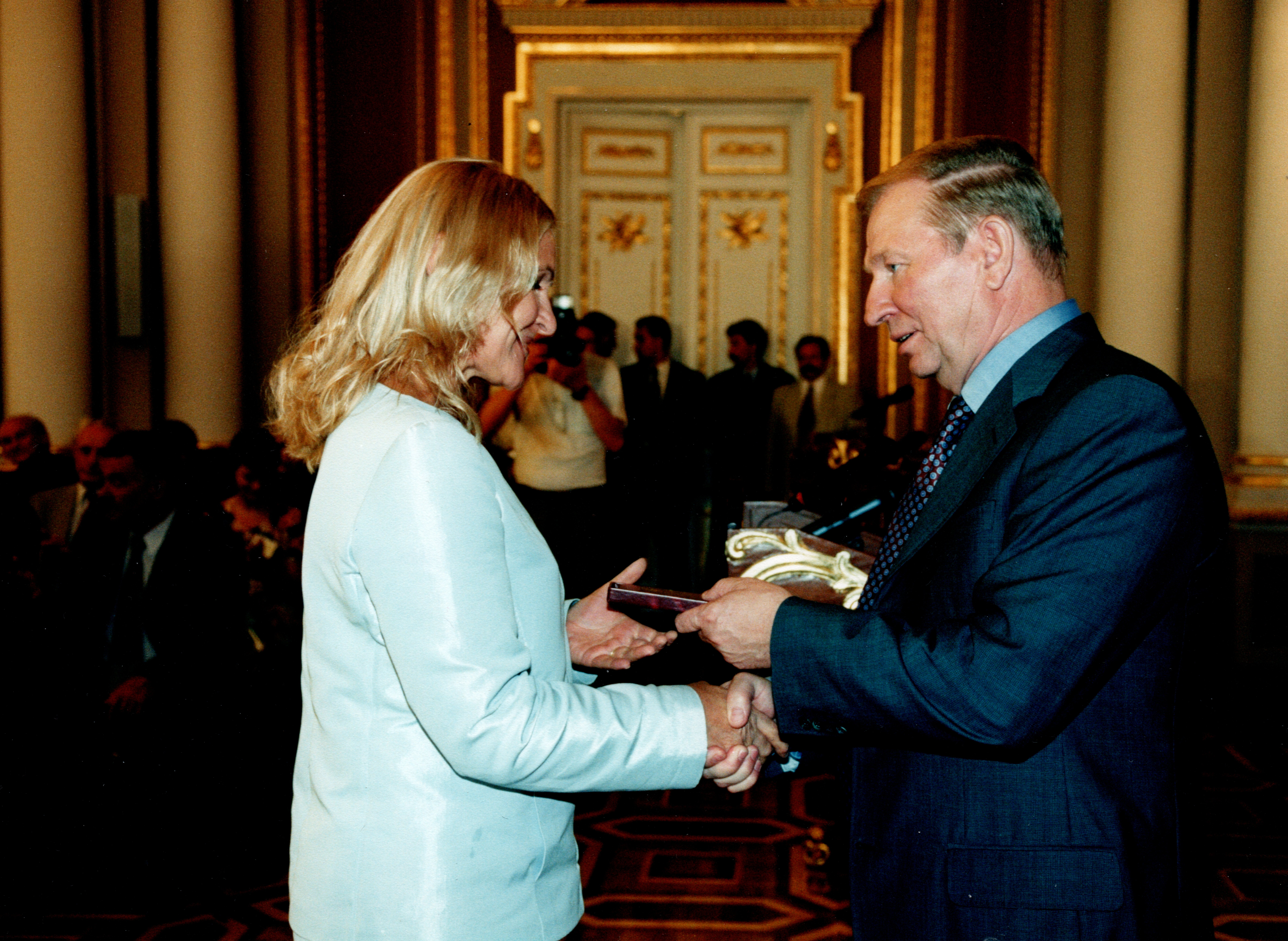
With Leonid Kuchma (2001)

Padalko has received numerous awards:

=== Medals ===
- 1999 — a commemorative medal "For the Faithful Service to the Hometown"
- 2004 — a medal "For Services to the City"
- 2009 — a medal Order of Princess Olga III degree
- 2019 — a commemorative medal "For Services to the City"

=== Other awards ===
- April 2004 — the Honorary Diploma of the Verkhovna Rada
- October 2005 — the Certificate of Honor of the Ministry of Healthcare of Ukraine
- June 2007 — by the October District Council of Dnipropetrovsk
- 2008 — the Ministry of Health Care Certificate of Ukraine
- November 2008 — the sign "Honor" of the Ministry of Agrarian Policy of Ukraine
- 2009 — the honorary title of the chairman of the Dnipropetrovs'k Regional Council and the distinguished name of the chairman of the Dnipropetrovsk Regional State Administration "For the development of the region"
- September 2010 — an honorary diploma from the Dnipropetrovsk regional organization
- August 2015 — the diploma and badge of the Verkhovna Rada of Ukraine
- 21 August 2001 — the honorary title "Honored Doctor of Ukraine"
- 15 May 2002 — Ph.D. in medical sciences specializing in obstetrics and gynecology
