= Kateryna Khomiak =

Ukrainian stage actress (1922–2018)

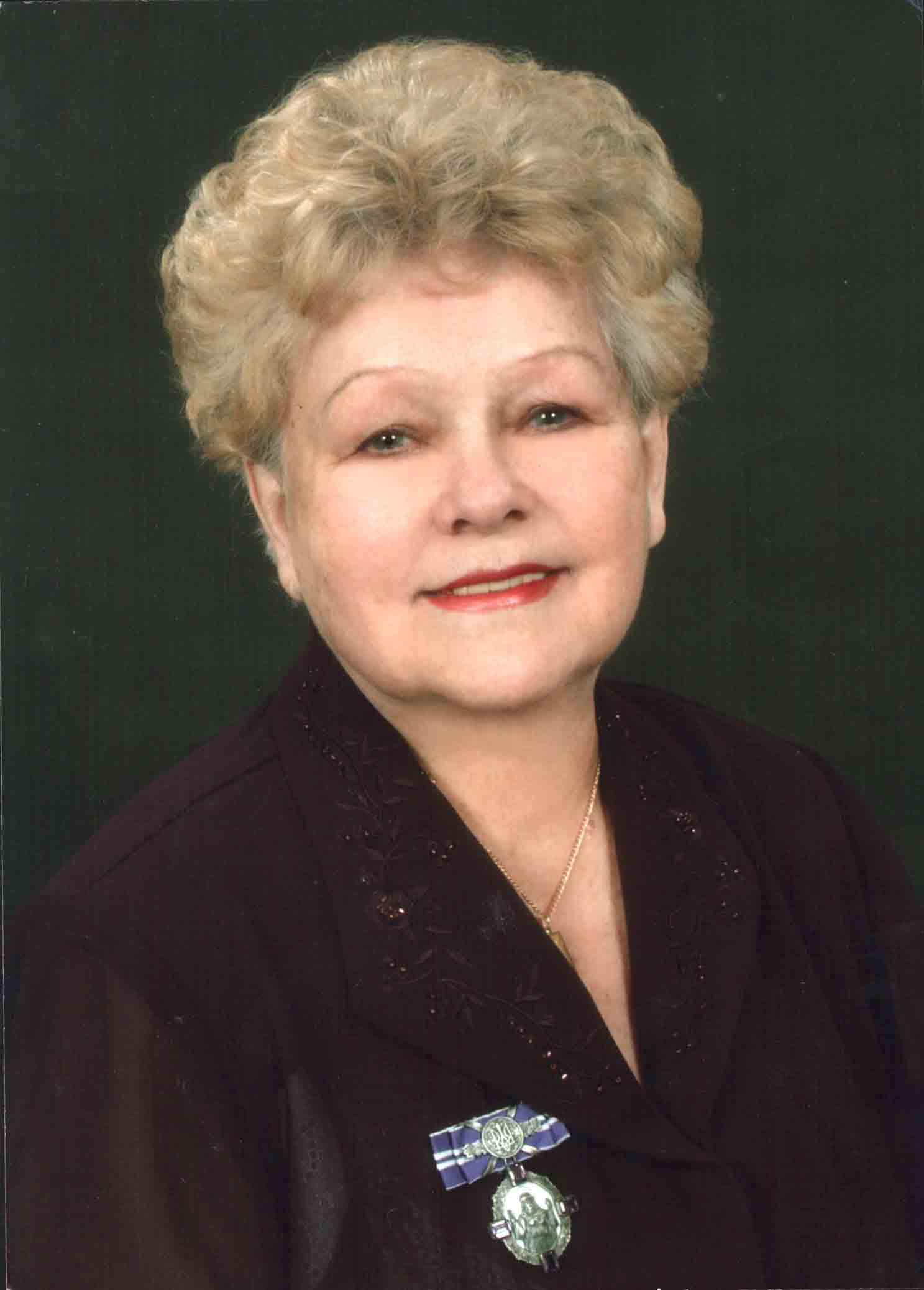
- Born: December 22, 1922; Sofiivka, Zaporizhzhia Oblast, Ukrainian SSR, Soviet Union
- Died: November 30, 2018 (aged 95); Lviv, Ukraine
- Occupation: Stage actress
- Years active: 1939–2012

Kateryna Petrivna Khomiak (Ukrainian: Катерина Петрівна Хом'як; 22 December 1922 - 30 November 2018) was a Ukrainian stage actress. She was named Merited Artist of the Ukrainian SSR in 1972 and received the Order of Princess Olga (3rd class) in 2003.

== Early life and education ==
Khomiak was born in Sofiivka, Zaporizhzhia Oblast. She was studied for two years at the Dnipropetrovsk Theatre School before the Second World War.

== Career ==
After the war Khomiak moved to Lviv, first performing in musical comedy and operetta before joining the Zankovetska Theater company in 1954, where she worked for some 50 years.

Khomiak is listed among distinguished natives of Vilniansk district and is the subject of a dedicated display in the local history museum.

== Awards and honours ==
- Merited Artist of the Ukrainian SSR (1972).
- Honorary distinction of the Ministry of Culture and Arts of Ukraine “For many years of fruitful work in culture” (2002).
- Order of Princess Olga, 3rd class (2003).

== Personal life and death ==
Khomiak married Roman Khomiak, the couple had two sons. She remained active on stage into her eighties and died in Lviv on 30 November 2018.
