= Maryna Nikitina =

Ukrainian politician

- Марина Нікітіна
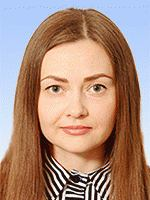
- Official portrait, 2019

People's Deputy of Ukraine
- Incumbent
- Assumed office 29 August 2019
- Preceded by: Vadym Kryvokhatko
- Constituency: Zaporizhzhia Oblast, No. 82

Personal details
- Born: 16 April 1986 (age 40) Huliaipole, Ukrainian SSR, Soviet Union (now Ukraine)
- Party: Servant of the People
- Other political affiliations: Independent
- Education: Classic Private University

Maryna Viktorivna Nikitina (Ukrainian: Марина Вікторівна Нікітіна; born 16 April 1986) is a Ukrainian lawyer and politician currently serving as a People's Deputy of Ukraine representing Ukraine's 82nd electoral district as a member of Servant of the People since 2019.

== Early life and career ==
Maryna Viktorivna Nikitina was born on 16 April 1986 in the city of Huliaipole, in Ukraine's southern Zaporizhzhia Oblast. She graduated from the Classic Private University in 2009, specialising in jurisprudence. She worked as a lawyer at Preobrazhene TOV from 2009 to 2013, before resigning to work as a lawyer voluntarily.

== Political career ==
During the 2019 Ukrainian presidential election, she was involved in the campaign of Volodymyr Zelenskyy.

In the 2019 Ukrainian parliamentary election, Nikitina was the candidate of Servant of the People for People's Deputy of Ukraine in Ukraine's 82nd electoral district. At the time of the election, she was an independent. She won the election with 40.43% of the vote. Her closest competitor, independent incumbent Vadym Kryvokhatko, received 20.96% of the vote.

In the Verkhovna Rada (Ukraine's parliament), Nikitina joined the Servant of the People faction, as well as the Verkhovna Rada Committee on Agricultural and Land Policies and the Equal Opportunities inter-factional association. During her tenure as a People's Deputy, Nikitina has been found guilty of corruption and forced to pay a fine of ₴3,400 for hiring her husband as an assistant with a salary of ₴24,000. Nikitina has also been criticised by anti-corruption non-governmental organisation Chesno for voting in favour of a bill on urban planning reform, which Chesno claims will place control over reconstruction following the 2022 Russian invasion of Ukraine in the hands of developers.
