= Sokolivka, Zaporizhzhia Oblast =

Sokolivka Соколівка
- Village
- Location of Sokolivka in Zaporizhzhia Oblast Sokolivka (Ukraine)
- Coordinates: 47°59′41″N 35°13′30″E
- Country: Ukraine
- Oblast: Zaporizhzhia Oblast
- District: Zaporizhzhia Raion
- Hromada: Vilniansk urban hromada
- Elevation: 94 m (308 ft)

Population (2001)
  - Total: 630
- Time zone: UTC+2 (EET)
  - Summer (DST): UTC+3 (EEST)
- Postal code: 70030
- Area code: +380 6143
- Climate: Dfa

Sokolivka (Ukrainian: Соколівка) is a village (a selo) in the Zaporizhzhia Raion (district) of Zaporizhzhia Oblast in southern Ukraine.

Until 18 July 2020, Sokolivka belonged to Vilniansk Raion. The raion was abolished that day as part of the administrative reform of Ukraine, which reduced the number of raions of Zaporizhzhia Oblast to five. The area of Vilniansk Raion was merged into Zaporizhzhia Raion.
