= Novomykolaivka, Zaporizhzhia Oblast =

Rural locality in Zaporizhzhia Oblast, Ukraine

Novomykolaivka Новомиколаївка
- Rural settlement
- Location in Zaporizhzhia Oblast Location in Ukraine
- Coordinates: 47°58′29″N 35°54′25″E
- Country: Ukraine
- Oblast: Zaporizhzhia Oblast
- Raion: Zaporizhzhia Raion

Population (2022)
  - Total: 4,983
- Time zone: UTC+2 (EET)
  - Summer (DST): UTC+3 (EEST)

Novomykolaivka (Ukrainian: Новомиколаївка; Russian: Новониколаевка) is a rural settlement in Zaporizhzhia Raion, Zaporizhzhia Oblast, southern Ukraine. It was formerly administered within Novomykolaivka Raion until 2020. It is located on the right bank of the Verkhnia Tersa, a tributary of the Vovcha in the drainage basin of the Dnieper. Population: 4,983 (2022 estimate).

== Geography ==
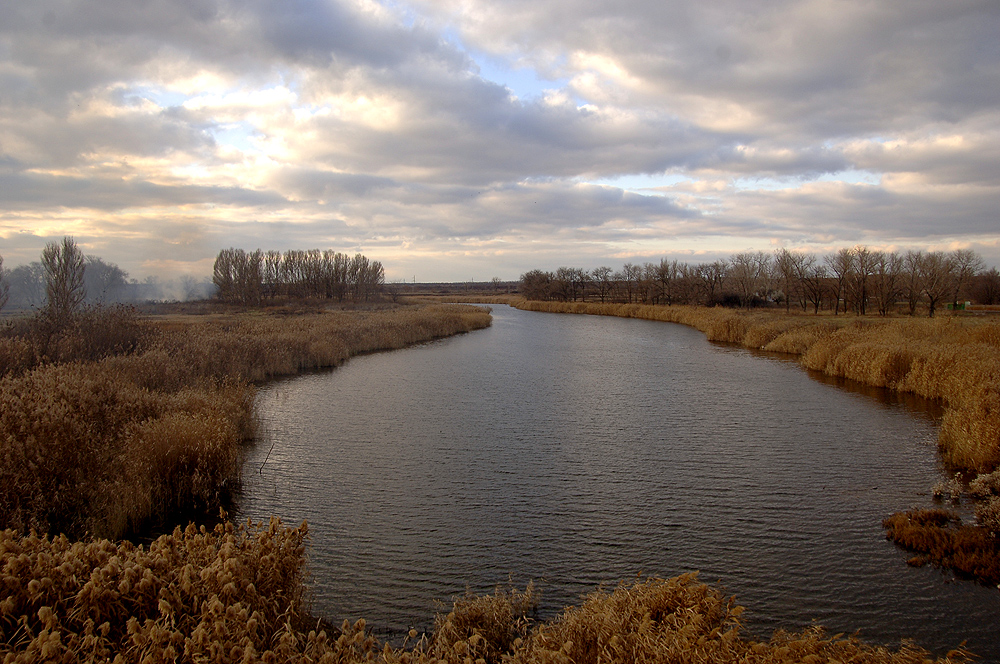
Verkhnia Tersa river.

The village of Novomykolaivka is located 66 km from the regional center of Zaporizhzhia (by highway N 15) and 38 km from Vilniansk, in the northeastern part of Zaporizhzhia Oblast, on the right bank of the Verkhnya Tersa River, 4 km upstream is the village of Maryanivka (Zaporizhzhya District), 4.5 km downstream is the village of Kamyanka (Zaporizhzhya District), and on the opposite bank is the village of Mykhailivske (Zaporizhzhya District). The national highways Highway N-15 and the territorial highways Highway T-0408 pass through the village. The distance to the nearest railway station Gaichur is 30 km.

== History ==
The first settlers were state peasants from the village of Kocherezhki, Pavlograd uezd, Yekaterinoslav Governorate. The settlement was also called Kocherezhki or Novi Kocherezhki. 1790 is the year of its foundation as the village of Kocherezhki. This name existed until 1812 (according to other sources until 1813), when Kocherezhki was renamed Novomykolayivka.

In December 1812, on St. Nicholas' Day, a newly built church was consecrated, and the village was renamed 'Novomykolayivka'. Territorially, Novomykolaivka belonged to the Pokrovskaya volost of Alexandrovsky Uyezd of Yekaterinoslav Governorate. By the mid-1880s of the 19th century, the village already had over 360 households, in which 2,390 people lived. There were five shops in the settlement, as well as several taverns. In 1888, a zemstvo single-class elementary school was opened in the premises of the church gatehouse.

In 1899, there were 551 courtyards in the settlement, where 3,427 people lived. On the eve of World War 1, there were already 578 courtyards in Novomykolaivka, and 3,128 people lived. In Novomykolaivka there were two steam mills, an oil mill, a cooperage, a carpentry workshop, a post and telegraph office and a telephone exchange.

In addition, at the beginning of the 20th century, two zemstvo and two church and parish schools were opened here. In 1903, a new school building was built at the expense of the zemstvo. Now the "Novomykolaiv Interschool Educational and Production Plant" is located and operates here. In Novomykolaivka at the end of the 19th century, ethnographer and folklorist Yakov Novitskyi discovered one of the copies of a letter from the Zaporozhian Cossacks to the Turkish Sultan.

On 20 November [O.S. 7 November] 1917, in accordance with the Third Universal of the Ukrainian Central Rada, it became part of the Ukrainian People's Republic. In early January 1918, Soviet power was established in the village. The Soviet authorities began to implement Lenin's Decree on Land, confiscating grain from the peasants and sending it to the country's industrial centers. In mid-April 1918, Novomykolaivka was occupied by German-Austrian troops. However, the Soviet authorities did not delay long, Denikin's offensive began. In mid-July 1919, parts of the 14th Soviet Army were knocked out of Novomykolaivka.

On December 31, 1919, parts of the 41st and 54th divisions of the 14th Army, commanded by Ieronim Uborevich, knocked out the White Guards from Novomykolaivka. In early August 1920, Pyotr Wrangel's troops captured the village, which changed hands several times. The fighting continued until October 1920. At the end of October 1920, parts of the 46th division of the 13th Army of the Red Army captured Novomykolaivka.

In 1923, Novomykolaivka became the district center of Zaporizhzhia Oblast. A 20-bed hospital was built here, staffed by a doctor, two paramedics, and a midwife, a pharmacy, as well as four primary schools and one special school. In 1926, the village had a population of 5,000. In 1929, a zootechnical school was established on the basis of a vocational school, where 15 teachers taught 254 students.

Since 1937, a power plant, a creamery, repair shops, and a large mill have operated in the village. In 1939, a stadium was built where district sports competitions were held. The district newspaper "Flag of Communism" was published. In the 1939/1940 academic year, a secondary school, an evening school for rural youth, and two primary schools operated, with 685 students. In 1935, a district culture house with a stationary cinema was opened. During the Holodomor of 1932–1933 organized by the Soviet authorities, at least 96 residents of the village died.

In October 1941, Soviet troops left Novomykolaivka. On 18 September 1943, parts of the 216th Rifle Division of the 54th Rifle Corps of the Southwestern Front under the command of Rodion Malinovsky knocked out units of the Wehrmacht and captured Novomykolaivka.

On 10 May 1957, the village was granted the status of urban-type settlement. However, in 1962, the territory of the district became part of the neighboring Vilniansk, Huliaipole, and Orikhiv Raions. In 1967 the Novomykolaivskyi Raion with the center in the village of Novomykolaivka again became a separate administrative unit.

In 1969, a music school was opened with classes: piano, accordion and folk instruments, where 55 children studied. A new district house of culture with a hall for 600 seats and a village club with a hall for 200 seats were built. A branch of the Zaporizhzhia Music and Drama Theater was opened at the Culture House.

On 19 May 2016, based on the order No. 275 of the head of the Zaporizhzhia Regional State Administration, the toponymic objects of the Novomykolaivka settlement were renamed.

On 19 July 2020, as a result of the administrative-territorial reform and liquidation of Novomykolaivka Raion, the urban-type settlement became part of the newly formed Zaporizhzhia Raion. Until 26 January 2024, Novomykolaivka was designated urban-type settlement. On this day, a new law entered into force which abolished this status, and Novomykolaivka became a rural settlement.

On September 28, 2022, as part of the Russo-Ukrainian war, Russian forces launched an artillery strike on the outskirts of the village of Novomykolaivka, destroying several infrastructure facilities and a recreation facility; there was damage to the residential sector.

== Demographics ==
Year	Inhabitants
1858	1,435
1886	2,390
1899	3,427
1913	3,128
1922	3,939
1959	4,569
1979	5,532
1989	5,988
2001	5,783
2010	5,532

== Economy ==
=== Transportation ===
The settlement is on Highway H15 connecting Zaporizhzhia and Marinka and previously going to Donetsk.

The closest railway station is in Vilniansk, on the railway connecting Zaporizhzhia and Synelnykove.

== Notable people ==
- Vitold Fokin (1932-2025), first prime minister of Ukraine
