= Ternuvate settlement hromada =

Ternuvate settlement hromada Тернуватська селищна громада
- Hromada
- Interactive map of Ternuvate settlement hromada
- Country: Ukraine
- Oblast: Zaporizhzhia Oblast
- Raion: Zaporizhzhia Raion

Area
  - Total: 257.0 km^{2} (99.2 sq mi)

Population (2020)
  - Total: 3,573
  - Density: 13.90/km^{2} (36.01/sq mi)
- Settlements: 16
- Villages: 15
- Towns: 1

Ternuvate settlement hromada (Ukrainian: Тернуватська селищна громада) is a hromada of Ukraine, located in Zaporizhzhia Raion, Zaporizhzhia Oblast. Its administrative center is the village of Ternuvate.

It has an area of 257.0 square kilometres (99.2 mi^{2}) and a population of 3,573, as of 2020.

The hromada includes 16 settlements: 1 town (Ternuvate) and 15 villages:

- Barvynivka
- Boikove
- Vasylkove
- Danylivka
- Zarichne
- Zirnytsia
- Zorivka
- Kosivtseve
- Lisne
- Liubytske
- Myrivka
- Prydorozhnie
- Rizdvianka
- Samiilivka
- Svitla Dolyna

== See also ==
- List of hromadas of Ukraine
