= Pryazovske Raion =

Former subdivision of Zaporizhzhia Oblast, Ukraine

Pryazovske Raion Приазовський район
- Raion
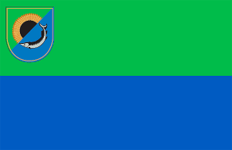
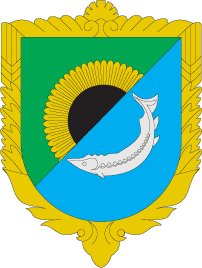
- Flag Coat of arms

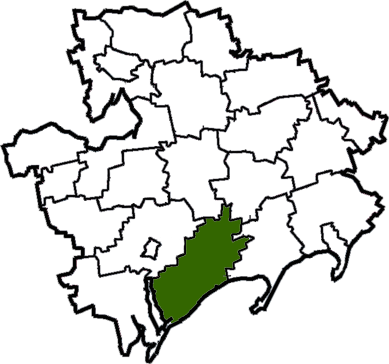
- Coordinates: 46°47′51.84″N 35°46′38.64″E
- Country: Ukraine
- Region: Zaporizhzhia Oblast
- Established: 1923
- Disestablished: 18 July 2020
- Admin. center: Pryazovske
- Subdivisions: List: 0 — city councils; 2 — settlement councils; 23 — rural councils; Number of localities: 0 — cities; 2 — urban-type settlements; 49 — villages; — rural settlements

Government
  - Governor: Vadym Suhina

Area
  - Total: 1,947 km^{2} (752 sq mi)

Population (2020)
  - Total: 26,280 ▼
  - Density: 13.50/km^{2} (34.96/sq mi)
- Time zone: UTC+02:00 (EET)
  - Summer (DST): UTC+03:00 (EEST)
- Postal index: 72400—72455
- Area code: +380 6133
- Website: http://priazrda.gov.ua/

Pryazovske Raion (Ukrainian: Приазовський район) was one of the raions (districts) of Zaporizhzhia Oblast in southern Ukraine. The administrative center of the region was the urban-type settlement of Pryazovske. The raion was abolished on 18 July 2020 as part of the administrative reform of Ukraine, which reduced the number of raions of Zaporizhzhia Oblast to five. The area of Pryazovske Raion was merged into Melitopol Raion. The last estimate of the raion population was 26,280 (2013 est.).
