= Mykhailivka settlement hromada =

Mykhailivka settlement hromada Михайлівська селищна громада
- Hromada
- Interactive map of Mykhailivka settlement hromada
- Country: Ukraine
- Oblast: Zaporizhzhia Oblast
- Raion: Vasylivka Raion
- Admin. center: Mykhailivka

Area
  - Total: 612.3 km^{2} (236.4 sq mi)

Population (2020)
  - Total: 19,280
  - Density: 31.49/km^{2} (81.55/sq mi)
- Settlements: 12
- Villages: 10
- Towns: 2

Mykhailivka settlement hromada (Ukrainian: Михайлівська селищна громада) is a hromada of Ukraine, located in Vasylivka Raion, Zaporizhzhia Oblast. Its administrative center is the town of Mykhailivka.

It has an area of 612.3 square kilometres (236.4 mi^{2}) and a population of 19,280, as of 2020.

The hromada includes 12 settlements: 2 towns (Mykhailivka and Pryshyb) and 10 villages:

- Burchak
- Vovkivka
- Novovolodymyrivka
- Pershotravneve
- Petrivka
- Rozivka
- Slovianka
- Smyrenivka
- Tarsalak
- Tymoshivka

== See also ==
- List of hromadas of Ukraine
