= Velyka Bilozerka =

Velyka Bilozerka Велика Білозерка
- Selo
- Location within Zaporizhzhia Oblast Location within Ukraine
- Coordinates: 47°16′21″N 34°42′03″E
- Country: Ukraine
- Oblast: Zaporizhzhia Oblast
- Raion: Vasylivka Raion

Population (2018)
  - Total: 8,339
- Time zone: UTC+2 (EET)
  - Summer (DST): UTC+3 (EEST)

Velyka Bilozerka (Ukrainian: Велика Білозерка; Russian: Великая Белозёрка) is a rural locality (selo) in Vasylivka Raion, Zaporizhzhia Oblast in Ukraine. Before July 18, 2020 it served as the administrative center of Velyka Bilozerka Raion, which was abolished. The population in 2018 was 8339.

Velyka Bilozerka is located on both banks of the Bilozerka River, a left tributary of the Dnieper.

== History ==
The locality was founded in 1778 by settlers from Chernigov and Poltava Governorates of the Russian Empire. It belonged to Novorossiya Governorate, since 1783 to Yekaterinoslav Viceroyalty, and since 1802 to Taurida Governorate. In ХІХ century the village was part of Veliko-Belozerka volost, Melitopolsky Uyezd, Taurida Governorate.

During the Russian invasion of Ukraine, it was occupied by Russia and is currently under Russian control.

== Economy ==
=== Transportation ===
Velyka Bilozerka is connected by roads with Kamianka-Dniprovska, Mykhailivka, and Melitopol. In Melitopol, it has access to the M14 highway connecting Odesa and Mariupol, as well as the M18 highway which runs to Kharkiv via Dnipro.
