= Ternuvate =

Rural locality in Zaporizhzhia Oblast, Ukraine

Ternuvate Тернувате
- Rural settlement
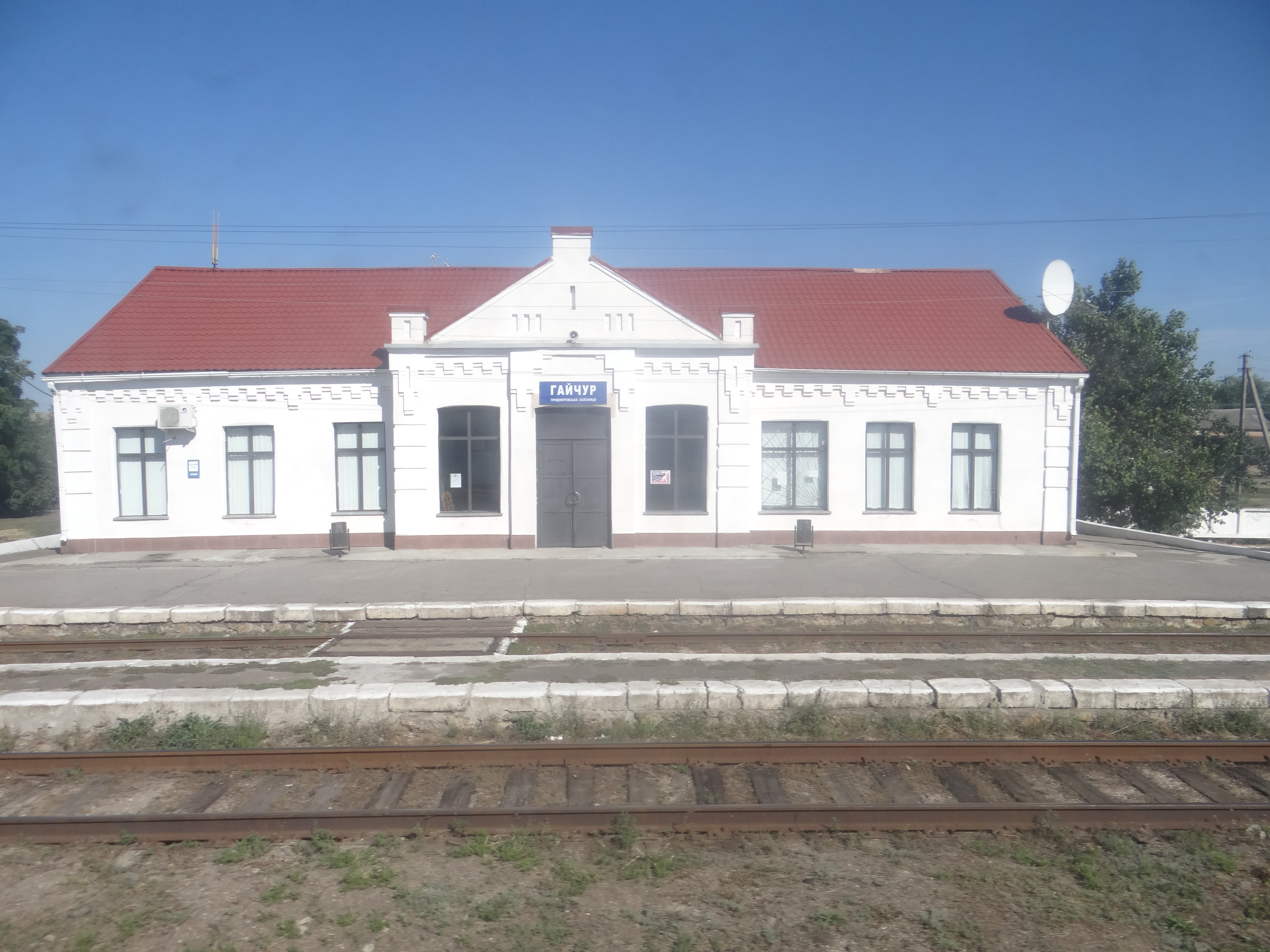
- Gaichur Station

- Location of Kamiane Ternuvate (Ukraine)
- Coordinates: 47°49′47″N 36°07′48″E
- Country: Ukraine
- Oblast: Zaporizhzhia Oblast
- Raion: Zaporizhzhia Raion
- Hromada: Ternuvate settlement hromada
- Founded: 1898
- Settlement status: 1946

Area
  - Total: 2.4 km^{2} (0.93 sq mi)
- Elevation: 154 m (505 ft)

Population (2022)
  - Total: 1,250
  - Density: 520/km^{2} (1,300/sq mi)
- Time zone: UTC+2 (EET)
  - Summer (DST): UTC+3 (EEST)
- Postal code: 70150
- Area code: +380 6144
- Climate: Dfa

Ternuvate (Ukrainian: Тернувате) is a rural settlement in Zaporizhzhia Raion, Zaporizhzhia Oblast, southern Ukraine. It was formerly administered under Novomykolaivka Raion before 2020. Population: 1,250 (2022 estimate). Ternuvate is the administrative center of the Ternuvate settlement hromada, a local government body that also administers three other villages.

== History ==
The settlement was first founded in 1898 as a settlement of Haichur. After World War II, it was renamed Ternuvate.

Until 26 January 2024, Ternuvate was designated urban-type settlement. On this day, a new law entered into force which abolished this status, and Ternuvate became a rural settlement.

On 30 January 2026, the Russian Ministry of Defence reported that Russian forces had captured the settlement as part of the Russo-Ukrainian war. However, in early February Ukrainian Defence Forces declared that the village had been cleared of Russian troops, although threat of enemy penetration in the area remained.
