= Yakymivka =

Rural locality in Zaporizhzhia Oblast, Ukraine

Yakymivka Якимівка
- Rural settlement
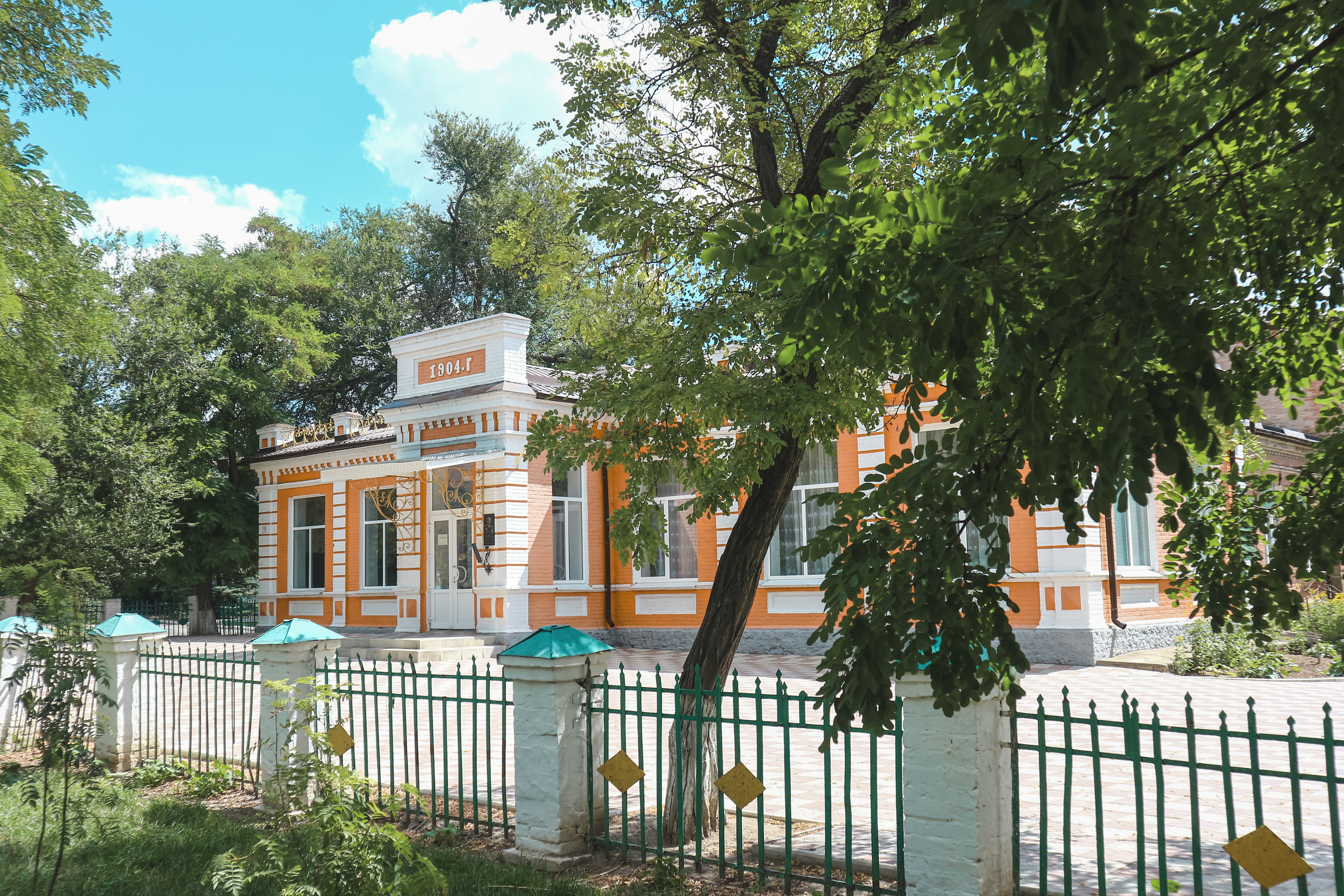
- School in Yakymivka

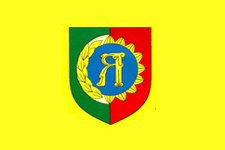
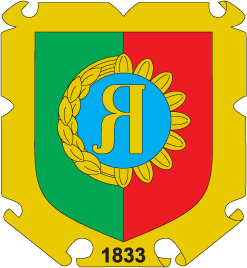
- Flag Coat of arms

- Location in Ukraine Yakymivka (Ukraine)
- Country: Ukraine
- Oblast: Zaporizhzhia Oblast
- Raion: Melitopol Raion
- Founded: 1833

Population (2022)
  - Total: 11,069
- Time zone: UTC+2 (EET)
  - Summer (DST): UTC+3 (EEST)

Yakymivka (Ukrainian: Якимівка; Russian: Акимовка, romanized: Akimovka) is a rural settlement in Melitopol Raion, Zaporizhzhia Oblast, in southern Ukraine. It was formerly the administrative center of Yakymivka Raion until the raion was abolished in 2020. Population: 11,069 (2022 estimate).

Yakymivka was first mentioned in historical documents in 1833 and named in honor of Yakym Kolosov, regional police ispravnic.

== History ==
During the Ukrainian War of Independence, from 1917 to 1920, it passed between various factions. Afterwards it was administratively part of the Zaporizhzhia Governorate of Ukraine.

Yakymivka came under attack during the 2022 Russian Invasion of Ukraine and was subsequently captured and occupied by Russian military forces. During the ongoing Russian occupation, the town became the scene of significant partisan warfare. On 28 April 2022, partisans destroyed the Yakymivka Railway Bridge with an explosive charge, disrupting vital Russian supply lines for weeks. On 11 June 2023, pro-Ukrainian guerillas blew up another key railway line near the settlement. In early April 2024, the former Russian-appointed mayor Maxim Zubarev was severely injured when pro-Ukrainian militants blew up his car. on 31 May 2025, the settlement became the scene of another major partisan attack, when militants blew up a section of a railway line, which led to the derailment of multiple freight cars, which were carrying Russian military equipment.

Until 26 January 2024, Yakymivka was designated urban-type settlement. On this day, a new law entered into force which abolished this status, and Yakymivka became a rural settlement.

== Demographics ==
At the time of the 2001 Ukrainian census, the settlement had a population of 12,832. Ukrainians constitute the majority of the population, yet over 80% of the inhabitants consider Russian as their native language.

Native languages in Yakymivka
Languages	percent
Russian	80.4%
Ukrainian	17.4%
Armenian	0.2%
Bulgarian	0.2%
Belarusian	0.1%
others	1.6%

== See also ==
- Administrative divisions of Zaporizhzhia Oblast
- List of places named after people
- List of railway stations in Ukraine
