= Pryshyb, Zaporizhzhia Oblast =

Rural locality in Zaporizhzhia Oblast, Ukraine

Pryshyb Пришиб
- Rural settlement
- Location in Zaporizhzhia Oblast Location in Ukraine
- Country: Ukraine
- Oblast: Zaporizhzhia Oblast
- Raion: Vasylivka Raion

Population (2022)
  - Total: 3,017
- Time zone: UTC+2 (EET)
  - Summer (DST): UTC+3 (EEST)

Pryshyb (Ukrainian: Пришиб, Russian: Пришиб) is a rural settlement in Vasylivka Raion of Zaporizhzhia Oblast in Ukraine. It is located in the steppe south of the city of Zaporizhzhia. Pryshyb belongs to Mykhailivka settlement hromada, one of the hromadas of Ukraine. Population: 3,017 (2022 estimate).

== History ==
Until 18 July 2020, Pryshyb belonged to Mykhailivka Raion. The raion was abolished in July 2020 as part of the administrative reform of Ukraine, which reduced the number of raions of Zaporizhzhia Oblast to five. The area of Mykhailivka Raion was merged into Vasylivka Raion.

Until 26 January 2024, Pryshyb was designated urban-type settlement. On this day, a new law entered into force which abolished this status, and Pryshyb became a rural settlement.

== Economy ==
=== Transportation ===
Pryshyb railway station, located in the settlement, on the railway connecting Zaporizhzhia and Melitopol. There is some passenger traffic.

The settlement is close to highway M18 which connects Zaporizhzhia and Melitopol.
