= Rozivka =

Rural locality in Zaporizhzhia Oblast, Ukraine

Rozivka Розівка
- Rural settlement
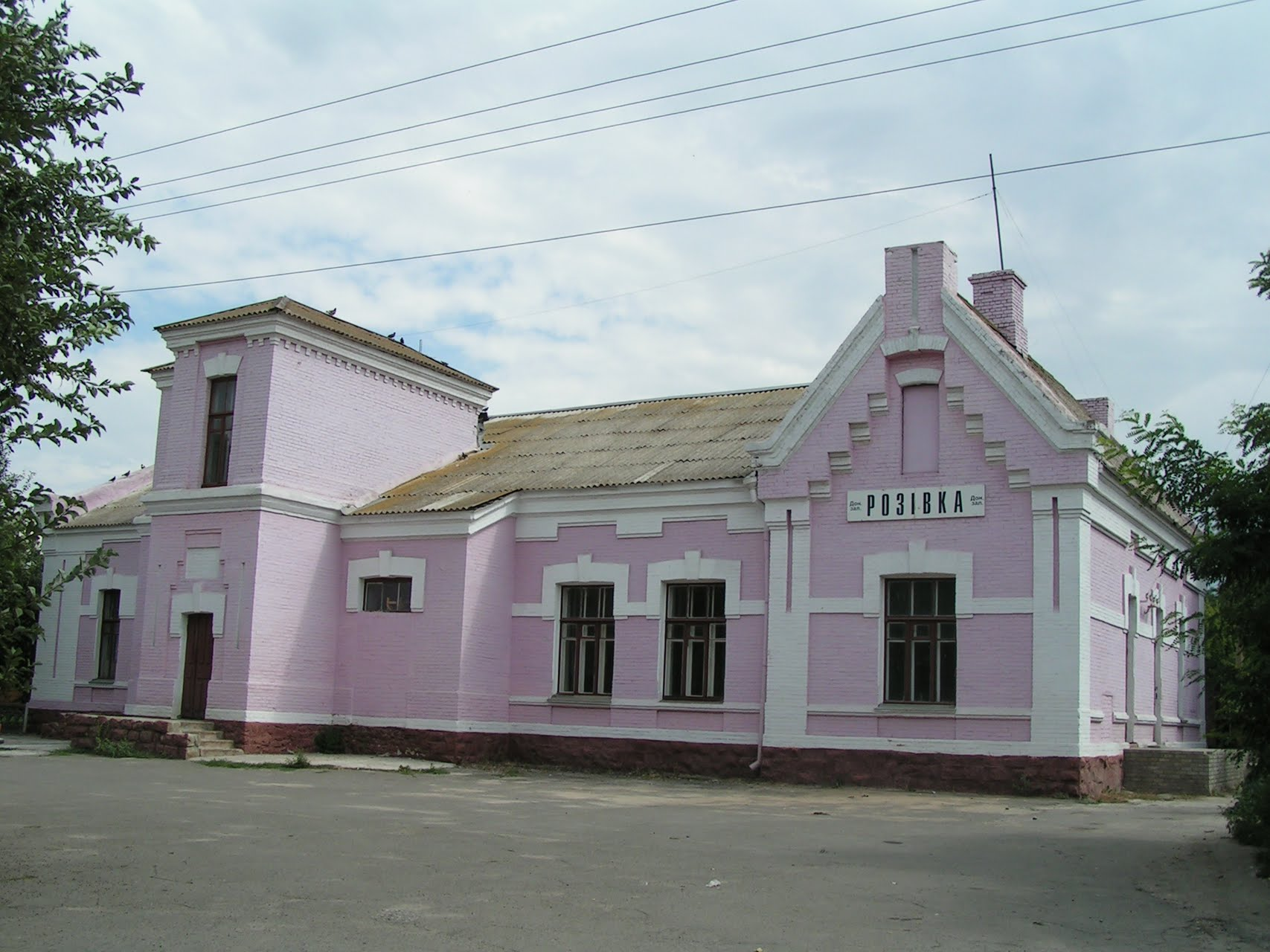
- Rozivka railway station

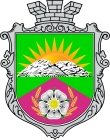
- Coat of arms

- Location in Zaporizhzhia Oblast Location in Ukraine
- Coordinates: 47°23′04″N 37°03′57″E
- Country: Ukraine
- Oblast: Zaporizhzhia Oblast
- Raion: Polohy Raion

Population (2022)
  - Total: 2,939
- Time zone: UTC+2 (EET)
  - Summer (DST): UTC+3 (EEST)

Rozivka (Ukrainian: Розівка; Russian: Розовка) is a rural settlement in Zaporizhzhia Oblast, southern Ukraine. It was the administrative center of Rozivka Raion until the raion was dissolved in 2020. It is located close to the source of the Karatysh, a right tributary of the Berda. Its population is 2,939 (2022 estimate). During the Russian invasion of Ukraine, it has been occupied by Russian forces.

== History ==
=== Early history ===
Rozivka takes its name from the German colony of settlers No. 7, Rosenberg, established in 1788, by immigrants from West Prussia. The existence of the colony was a direct result of a policy sponsored by Catherine II, who invited various wealthy Germans to settle in Tavria (and in other areas of Ukraine), promising to cover various expenses, infrastructure and most importantly to exempt them from taxes for a duration of 30 years.

=== Soviet Period ===
Despite the settlers moving in the area in 1788, the village of Rozivka itself was only fully established in 1925, when it was named "Rosa Luxembourg", inspired by the name German revolutionary Rosa Luxembourg, who was part of the Spartacist revolutionary attempt, the decision for the name was taken at a general Soviet meeting held on July 18, 1923.

Initially, there was a very powerful farm with 250 cows in the area, however, as Operation Barbarossa occurred and as the Germans started to get closer to the village, Soviet authorities, in 1941, decided to relocate said livestock in Azerbaijan SSR, depriving the village of one of its most important industries. When the village was finally liberated on September 19, 1943, 11 soldiers of the Red Army, 2 pilots, and 1 scout died.

The village struggled throughout the 50s, and only started to recover by the 70s and the 80s, leading to its current status as a local powerful agricultural enterprise.

=== History following the independence of Ukraine ===
The settlement was occupied during the Russian invasion of Ukraine by Russia.

Until 26 January 2024, Rozivka was designated urban-type settlement. On this day, a new law entered into force which abolished this status, and Rozivka became a rural settlement. Russia does not recognize this change.

== Demographics ==
As of the 2001 Ukrainian census, Rozivka had a population of 4,379 inhabitants. The composition of the population by their first languages was as follows:

Native languages in Rozivka
	percent
Ukrainian	80.4%
Russian	19.1%
Belarusian	0.1%
Greek	0.1%
Armenian	0.1%
Romanian	0.1%
others	0.1%

== Economy ==
=== Transportation ===
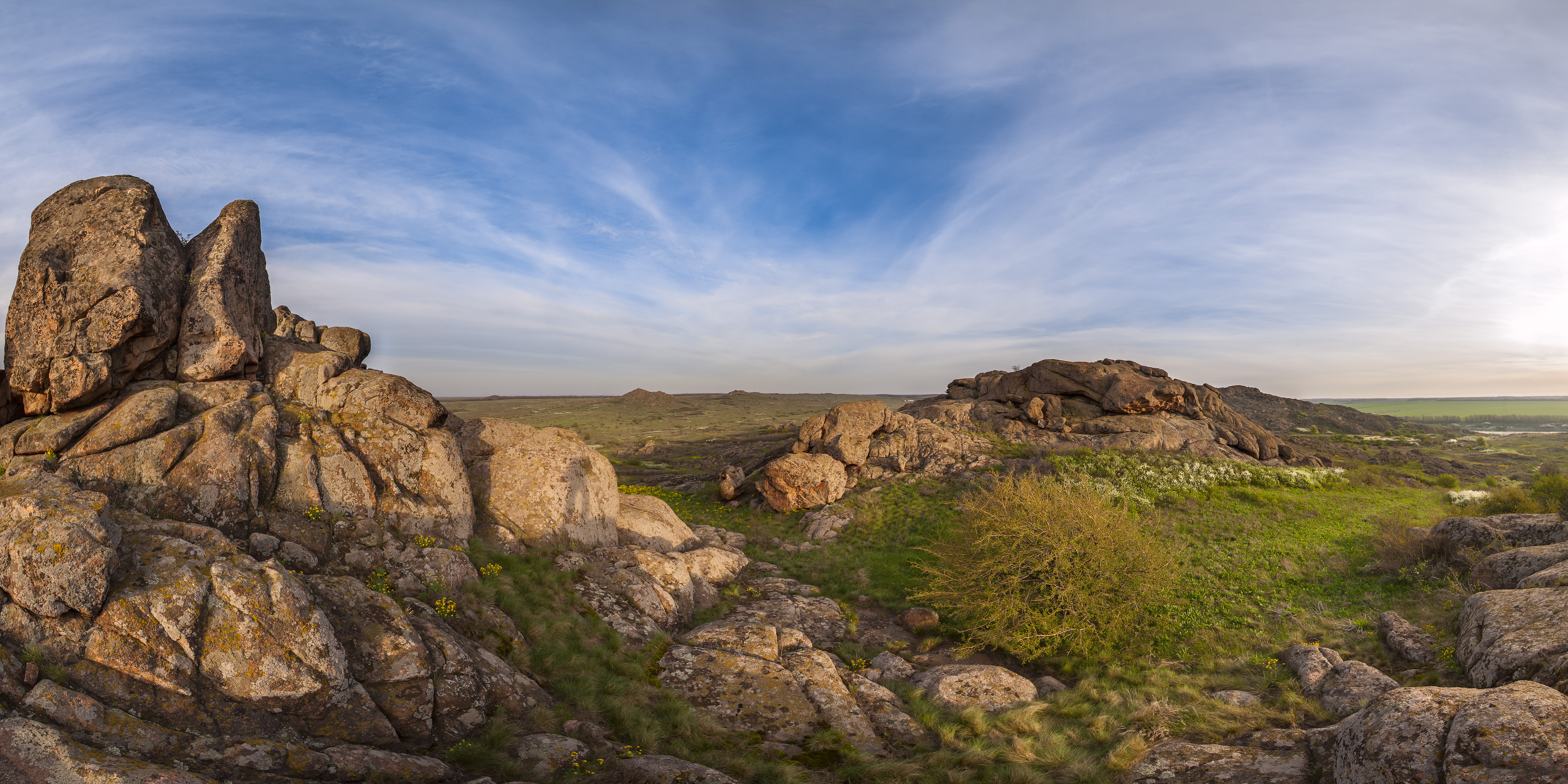
Kamyani Mohyly

The settlement is on Highway H08 connecting Zaporizhzhia and Mariupol.

Rozivka railway station has connections to Zaporizhzhia, Volnovakha, and Berdiansk. There is passenger traffic through the station.

== Landmarks ==
Kamyani Mohyly natural reserve is located on the Azov Upland near the settlement.
