= Vilniansk urban hromada =

Vilniansk urban hromada Вільнянська міська громада
- Hromada
- Interactive map of Vilniansk urban hromada
- Country: Ukraine
- Oblast: Zaporizhzhia
- Raion: Zaporizhzhia

Area
  - Total: 158.4 km^{2} (61.2 sq mi)

Population (2020)
  - Total: 16,822
  - Density: 106.2/km^{2} (275.1/sq mi)
- Settlements: 16
- Cities: 1
- Villages: 15

Vilniansk urban hromada (Ukrainian: Вільнянська міська громада) is a hromada of Ukraine, located in Zaporizhzhia Raion, Zaporizhzhia Oblast. Its administrative center is the city Vilniansk.

It has an area of 158.4 square kilometres (61.2 mi^{2}) and a population of 16,822, as of 2020.

The hromada contains 16 settlements: 1 city (Vilniansk) and 15 villages:

- Agrafenivka
- Veseloternuvate
- Vyshnyaki
- Vilyanka
- Harasivka
- Hryzne
- Derezivka
- Kozakivske
- Lyubimivka
- Novogupalivka
- Novotroitske
- Petrivske
- Skelyuvate
- Smorodine
- Yakymivske

== See also ==
- List of hromadas of Ukraine
