= Yakymivka Raion =

Former subdivision of Zaporizhzhia Oblast, Ukraine

Yakymivka Raion Якимівський район
- Raion
- Flag Coat of arms

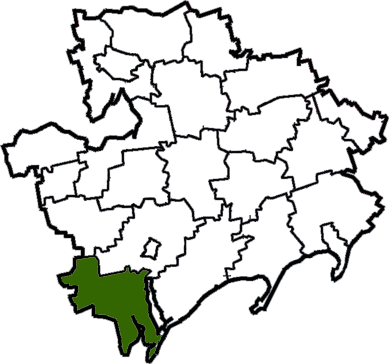
- Coordinates: 46°37′42.55″N 35°1′50.36″E
- Country: Ukraine
- Oblast: Zaporizhzhia Oblast
- Disestablished: 18 July 2020
- Admin. center: Yakymivka
- Subdivisions: List: 0 — city councils; 2 — settlement councils; 12 — rural councils; Number of localities: 0 — cities; 2 — urban-type settlements; 39 — villages; — rural settlements

Government
  - Governor: Anatoliy Bloha

Area
  - Total: 1,850 km^{2} (710 sq mi)

Population (2020)
  - Total: 32,490 ▼
  - Density: 17.6/km^{2} (45.5/sq mi)
- Time zone: UTC+02:00 (EET)
  - Summer (DST): UTC+03:00 (EEST)
- Postal index: 72500—72564
- Area code: +380 6131

Yakymivka Raion (Ukrainian: Якимівський район) was one of raions (districts) of Zaporizhzhia Oblast in southern Ukraine. The administrative center of the region was the urban-type settlement of Yakymivka. The raion was abolished on 18 July 2020 as part of the administrative reform of Ukraine, which reduced the number of raions of Zaporizhzhia Oblast to five. The area of Yakymivka Raion was merged into Melitopol Raion. The last estimate of the raion population was 32,490 (2020 est.).
