= Velyka Bilozerka Raion =

Former subdivision of Zaporizhzhia Oblast, Ukraine

Velyka Bilozerka Raion Великобілозерський район
- Raion
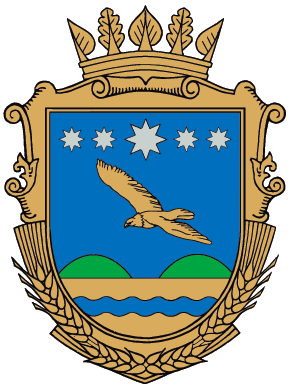
- Flag Coat of arms

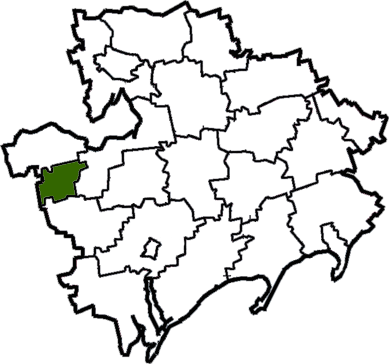
- Coordinates: 47°16′27″N 34°42′36″E
- Country: Ukraine
- Oblast: Zaporizhzhia Oblast
- Established: 1993
- Disestablished: 18 July 2020
- Admin. center: Velyka Bilozerka
- Subdivisions: List: 0 — city councils; 0 — settlement councils; 5 — rural councils; Number of localities: 0 — cities; 0 — urban-type settlements; 5 — villages; — rural settlements

Government
  - Governor: Volodymyr Shentyabin

Area
  - Total: 470 km^{2} (180 sq mi)

Population (2020)
  - Total: 7,644 ▼
  - Density: 16/km^{2} (42/sq mi)
- Time zone: UTC+02:00 (EET)
  - Summer (DST): UTC+03:00 (EEST)
- Postal index: 71400—71411
- Area code: +380 6156

Velyka Bilozerka Raion (Ukrainian: Великобілозерський район) was one of raions (districts) of Zaporizhzhia Oblast in southern Ukraine. The administrative center of the region was the selo of Velyka Bilozerka. In the 21st century, this is the only raion in Ukraine which had a rural locality as an administrative center. The raion was abolished on 18 July 2020 as part of the administrative reform of Ukraine, which reduced the number of raions of Zaporizhzhia Oblast to five. The area of Velyka Bilozerka Raion was merged into Vasylivka Raion. The last estimate of the raion population was 7,644 (2020 est.).
