= Andriivka, Berdiansk Raion, Zaporizhzhia Oblast =

Rural locality in Zaporizhzhia Oblast, Ukraine

Andriivka Андріївка
- Rural settlement
- Location in Zaporizhzhia Oblast Location in Ukraine
- Country: Ukraine
- Oblast: Zaporizhzhia Oblast
- Raion: Berdiansk Raion

Population (2022)
  - Total: 2,612
- Time zone: UTC+2 (EET)
  - Summer (DST): UTC+3 (EEST)

Andriivka (Ukrainian: Андріївка; Russian: Андре́евка) is a rural settlement in Berdiansk Raion, Zaporizhzhia Oblast, southern Ukraine. It is located on the banks of the Kiltichiia, a tributary of the Obytichna. Andriivka hosts the administration of Andriivka settlement hromada, one of the hromadas of Ukraine. Population: 2,612 (2022 estimate).

== History ==
Until 26 January 2024, Andriivka was designated urban-type settlement. On this day, a new law entered into force which abolished this status, and Andriivka became a rural settlement.

== Economy ==
=== Transportation ===
The settlement is connected by road with Berdiansk, Polohy, and Tokmak.
