= Rozivka Raion =

Former subdivision of Zaporizhzhia Oblast, Ukraine

Rozivka Raion Розівський район
- Raion
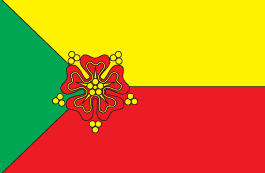
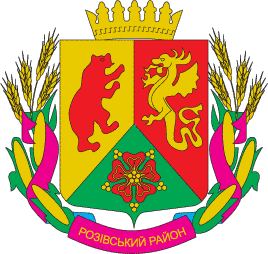
- Flag Coat of arms

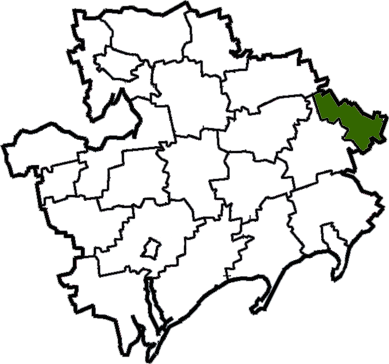
- Coordinates: 47°27′36.15″N 37°0′52.83″E
- Country: Ukraine
- Oblast: Zaporizhzhia Oblast
- Established: 26 June 1992
- Disestablished: 18 July 2020
- Admin. center: Rozivka
- Subdivisions: List: 0 — city councils; 1 — settlement councils; 7 — rural councils; Number of localities: 0 — cities; 1 — urban-type settlements; 25 — villages; — rural settlements

Government
  - Governor: Volodymyr Popov

Area
  - Total: 610 km^{2} (240 sq mi)

Population (2020)
  - Total: 8,277 ▼
  - Density: 14/km^{2} (35/sq mi)
- Time zone: UTC+02:00 (EET)
  - Summer (DST): UTC+03:00 (EEST)
- Postal index: 70300—70333
- Area code: +380 6162
- Website: http://zprozrda.gov.ua

Rozivka Raion (Ukrainian: Розівський район) was a former raion (districts) of Zaporizhzhia Oblast in southern Ukraine. The administrative center of the region was the urban-type settlement of Rozivka. The raion was abolished on 18 July 2020 as part of the administrative reform of Ukraine, which reduced the number of raions of Zaporizhzhia Oblast to five. The area of Rozivka Raion was merged into Polohy Raion. The last estimate of the raion population was 8,277 (2020 est.).

On 19 April 2022, during the 2022 Russian invasion of Ukraine, a town hall assembly was reportedly organized in Russian-occupied Rozivka, where a majority of attendees (mainly seniors) voted by hand to join the separatist Donetsk People's Republic. This came despite two major issues. The first being that the raion is outside Donetsk Oblast and therefore outside the borders initially claimed by the DPR and its leadership. The second being that the raion hadn't existed for over two years at the time of the vote. Locals claimed the vote was rigged and that organizers threatened anyone voting against with arrest and since the vote the town has been de facto governed by the DPR.
