= Mykhailivka Raion =

Former subdivision of Zaporizhzhia Oblast, Ukraine

Mykhailivka Raion Михайлівський район
- Raion
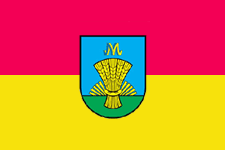
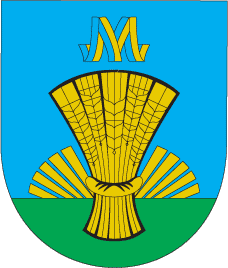
- Flag Coat of arms

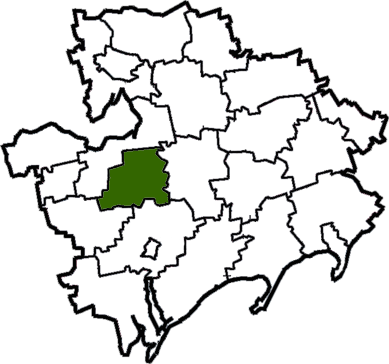
- Coordinates: 47°13′41.24″N 35°13′3.72″E
- Country: Ukraine
- Oblast: Zaporizhzhia Oblast
- Established: 1923
- Disestablished: 18 July 2020
- Admin. center: Mykhailivka
- Subdivisions: List: 0 — city councils; 2 — settlement councils; 8 — rural councils; Number of localities: 0 — cities; 2 — urban-type settlements; 46 — villages; — rural settlements

Government
  - Governor: Serhiy Perederiy

Area
  - Total: 1,067 km^{2} (412 sq mi)

Population (2020)
  - Total: 27,862 ▼
  - Density: 26.11/km^{2} (67.63/sq mi)
- Time zone: UTC+02:00 (EET)
  - Summer (DST): UTC+03:00 (EEST)
- Postal index: 72000—72045
- Area code: +380 6132
- Website: http://mihrda.gov.ua

Mykhailivka Raion (Ukrainian: Михайлівський район) was one of raions (districts) of Zaporizhzhia Oblast in southern Ukraine. The administrative center of the region was the urban-type settlement of Mykhailivka. The raion was abolished on 18 July 2020 as part of the administrative reform of Ukraine, which reduced the number of raions of Zaporizhzhia Oblast to five. The area of Mykhailivka Raion was merged into Vasylivka Raion. The last estimate of the raion population was 27,862 (2020 est.).
