= Mykhailivka, Vasylivka Raion, Zaporizhzhia Oblast =

Rural locality in Zaporizhzhia Oblast, Ukraine

Mykhailivka Михайлівка
- Rural settlement
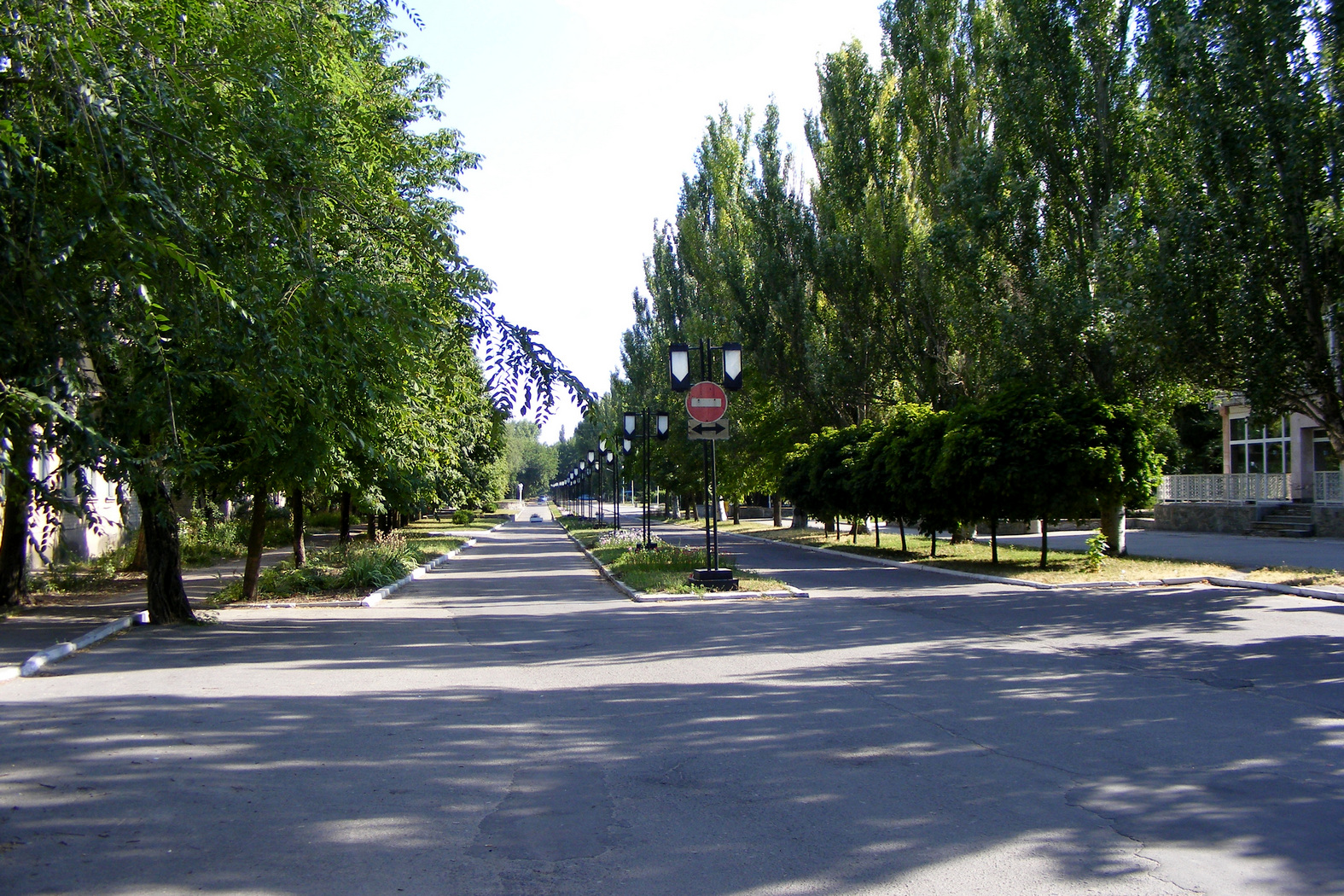

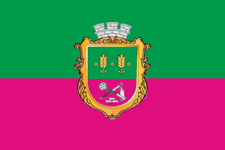
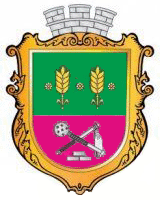
- Flag Coat of arms

- Location in Ukraine Mykhailivka (Ukraine)
- Coordinates: 47°16′10″N 35°13′20″E
- Country: Ukraine
- Oblast: Zaporizhzhia Oblast
- Raion: Vasylivka Raion
- Hromada: Mykhailivka settlement hromada

Government
  - Occupation Civil-Military Administration Head: Vyacheslav Bidnyak

Area
  - Total: 34 km^{2} (13 sq mi)

Population (2022)
  - Total: 11,530
- Time zone: UTC+2 (EET)
  - Summer (DST): UTC+3 (EEST)

Mykhailivka (Ukrainian: Михайлівка) is a rural settlement in Zaporizhzhia Oblast, southern Ukraine. It was the administrative center of the former Mykhailivka Raion until 2020. 11,530 (2022 estimate). Occupied by Russia since February 26, 2022.

== History ==
During the Ukrainian War of Independence, from 1917 to 1920, it passed between various factions. Afterwards it was administratively part of the Zaporizhzhia Governorate of Ukraine.

During the 2022 Russian invasion of Ukraine, Russian troops entered and took over Myhailivka. People later went out to protest this and planted a Ukrainian flag in the town square. The Russians caused a shortage of food and medicine, and the Russian military robbed shops, pharmacies, and private companies. During the protest of civilians against Russia, Russian troops used intimidation with machine guns, tanks, armored personnel carriers, and snipers. On August 24, 2022 (Ukrainian Independence Day), Ukrainian partisans killed the pro-Russian mayor of Mykhailivka - Ivan Sushko.

Until 26 January 2024, Mykhailivka was designated urban-type settlement. On this day, a new law entered into force which abolished this status, and Mykhailivka became a rural settlement.

== Demographics ==
Native language composition as of the Ukrainian national census in 2001:

Native languages in Mykhailivka
	percent
Ukrainian	76.4%
Russian	22.2%
Armenian	0.5%
Romani	0.3%
Belarusian	0.2%
Moldovan	0.1%
others	0.3%
