= Pryazovske =

Rural locality in Zaporizhzhia Oblast, Ukraine

Pryazovske Приазовське
- Rural settlement
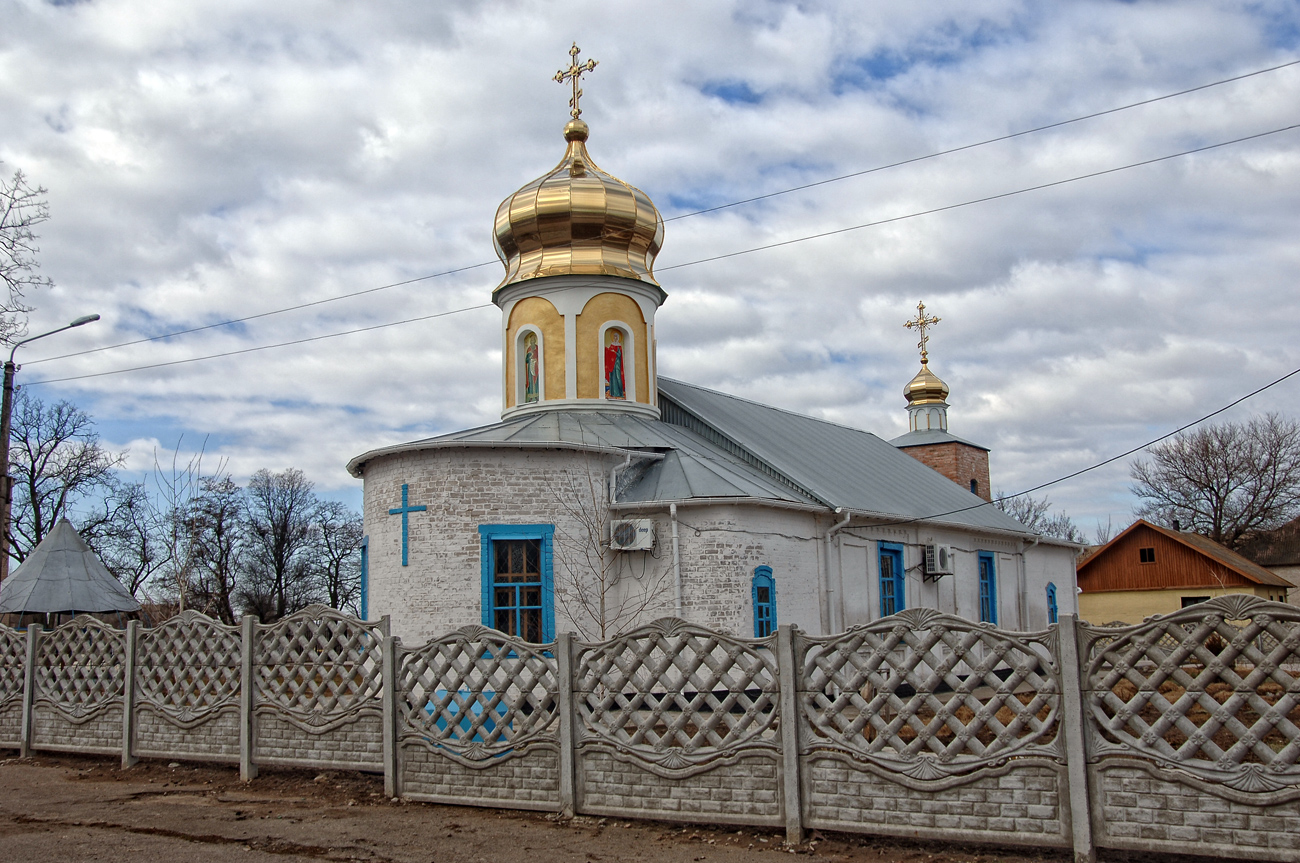

- Location in Zaporizhzhia Oblast Location in Ukraine
- Coordinates: 46°43′38″N 35°38′21″E
- Country: Ukraine
- Oblast: Zaporizhzhia Oblast
- Raion: Melitopol Raion

Population (2022)
  - Total: 6,295
- Time zone: UTC+2 (EET)
  - Summer (DST): UTC+3 (EEST)

Pryazovske (Ukrainian: Приазовське; Russian: Приазовское) is a rural settlement in Zaporizhzhia Oblast, southern Ukraine. It is located on the Domuzla, approximately 15 kilometres (9.3 mi) from the shore of the Sea of Azov. Population: 6,295 (2022 estimate).

== History ==
Until 26 January 2024, Pryazovske was designated urban-type settlement. On this day, a new law entered into force which abolished this status, and Pryazovske became a rural settlement.

== Economy ==
=== Transportation ===
The settlement is on Highway M14 which connects it with Mariupol to the east and with Melitopol, Kherson, Mykolaiv, and Odesa to the west.

The closest railway station is in Melitopol.
