= Vilniansk =

City in Zaporizhzhia Oblast, Ukraine

Vilniansk Вільнянськ Вольнянск
- City
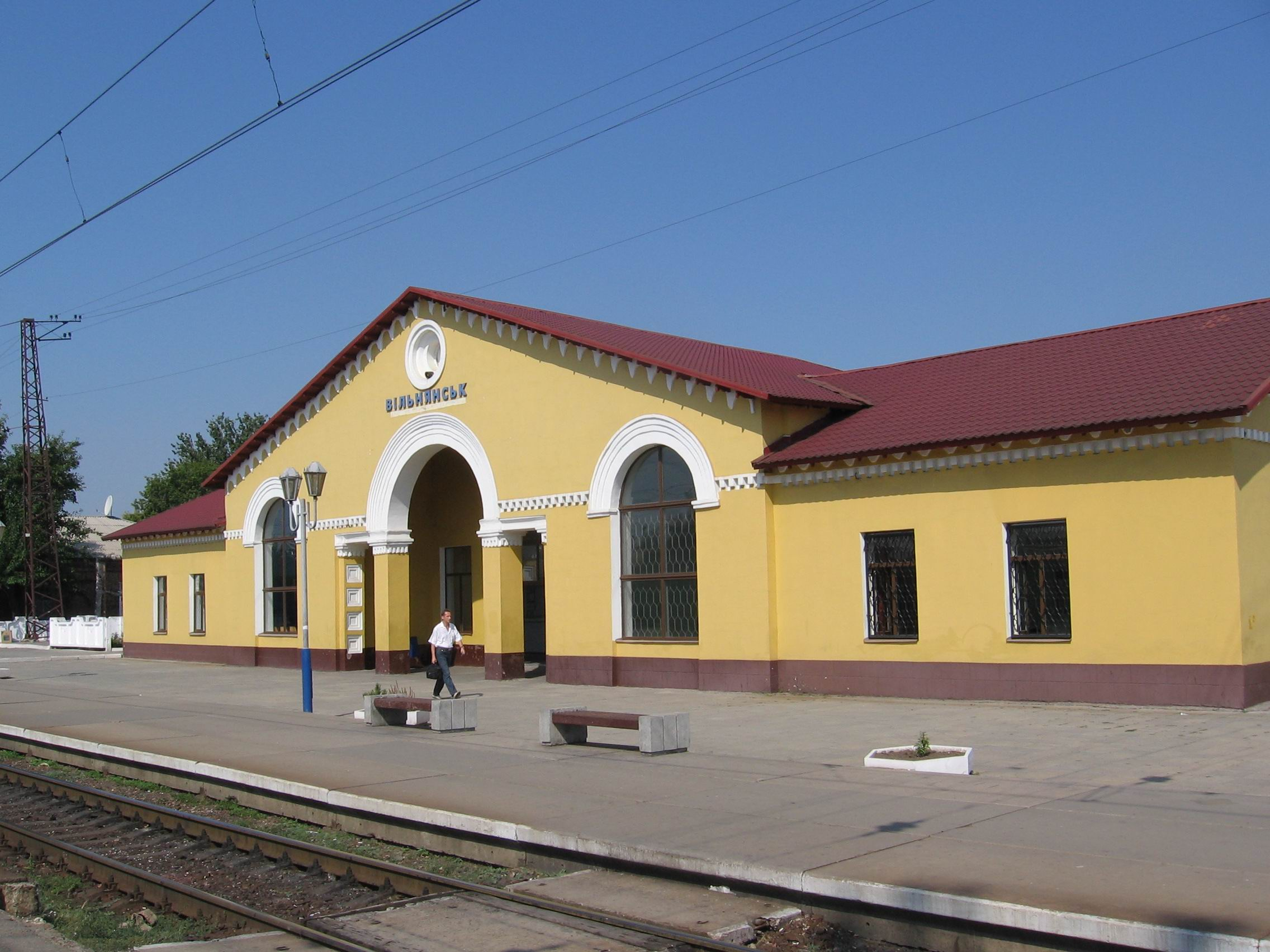
- Vilniansk railway station

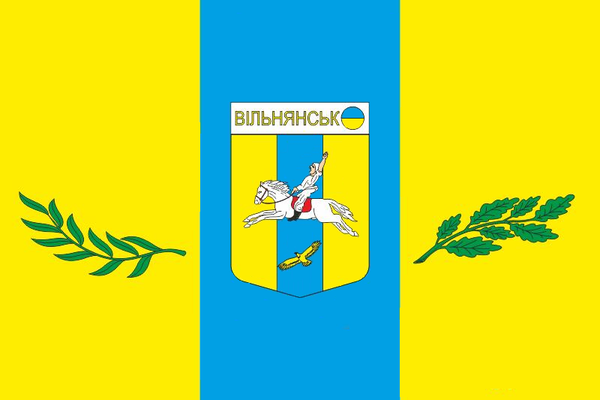
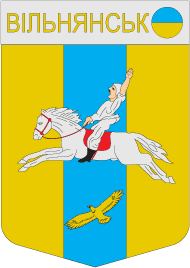
- Flag Coat of arms
- Interactive map of Vilniansk
- Location in Zaporizhzhia Oblast Location in Ukraine
- Coordinates: 47°56′31″N 35°25′41″E
- Country: Ukraine
- Oblast: Zaporizhzhia Oblast
- Raion: Zaporizhzhia Raion
- Hromada: Vilniansk urban hromada

Government
  - Mayor: Natalya Musienko

Area
  - Total: 4.2 km^{2} (1.6 sq mi)
- Elevation: 157 m (515 ft)

Population (2022)
  - Total: 14,324
  - Density: 3,400/km^{2} (8,800/sq mi)
- Climate: Dfa
- Website: vilnyanska.gromada.org.ua

Vilniansk (Ukrainian: Вільнянськ, pronounced [wilʲˈnʲɑnʲsʲk]; Russian: Вольнянск, romanized: Volnyansk, pronounced [vɐlʲˈnʲansk]) is a city in Zaporizhzhia Oblast, in eastern Ukraine and the administrative center of Vilniansk urban hromada. Population: 14,324 (2022 estimate).

It was the administrative center of Vilniansk Raion (district) until 2020, when the raion was abolished in accordance with administrative reforms and its area merged into Zaporizhzhia Raion.

== History ==
The town was founded in 1840 as the village of "Sofiyevka" by the Meshchersky and Kostrikov families of Russian district nobles. During the Ukrainian War of Independence, from 1917 to 1920, it passed between various factions. Afterwards it was administratively part of the Zaporizhzhia Governorate of Ukraine.

In 1935, the village was renamed into the town Krasnoarmeyskoe. In 1944 it was renamed into the town Chervonoarmeyskoe.

In 1966, the village became the town of Volnyansk. In 1969, the population was 11,800 people. A cutlery factory, a plastics factory, and a butter factory operated here.

In January 1989 the population was 17,566 people, or 8,114 men and 9,452 women. The largest enterprises at that time were the tool factory and the plastic products factory.

== Demographics ==
As of August 2024, the population was approximately 16,000 people.

Ukrainian language is the main and only official language of the city.

As of the Ukrainian national census in 2001, Vilniansk had a population of 16,456 inhabitants. The ethnic and linguistic composition was as follows:

Ethnic groups in Vilniansk
	percent
Ukrainians	86.06%
Russians	12.11%
Belarusians	0.45%
Armenians	0.38%
Bulgarians	0.19%
Germans	0.13%

Native languages (2001)
	percent
Ukrainian	86.5%
Russian	13.0%
Belarusian	0.2%
Armenian	0.1%
others	0.1%

== Economy ==
- Volnyansk Machine-Building Plant named after Shevchenko (LLC NPP Rost)
- Sribna Polyana (Shevchenko Plant)
- Ritm LLC
- Volnyansk Grain Factory LLC
- Volnyansk Butter Plant OJSC
- Agroinvest 08 LLC
- Alternative Solar Batteries LLC
- Agrotechservice CJSC
- Pozhtekhnika LLC
- Ukrtelecom JSC
- Mulino LLC
- Volnyansk Poultry Farm
- Delivery
- Nova Poshta

== Transportation ==
- Volnyansk Railway Station on the Kharkiv-Sevastopol Line
- Central Bus Station

== Religion ==
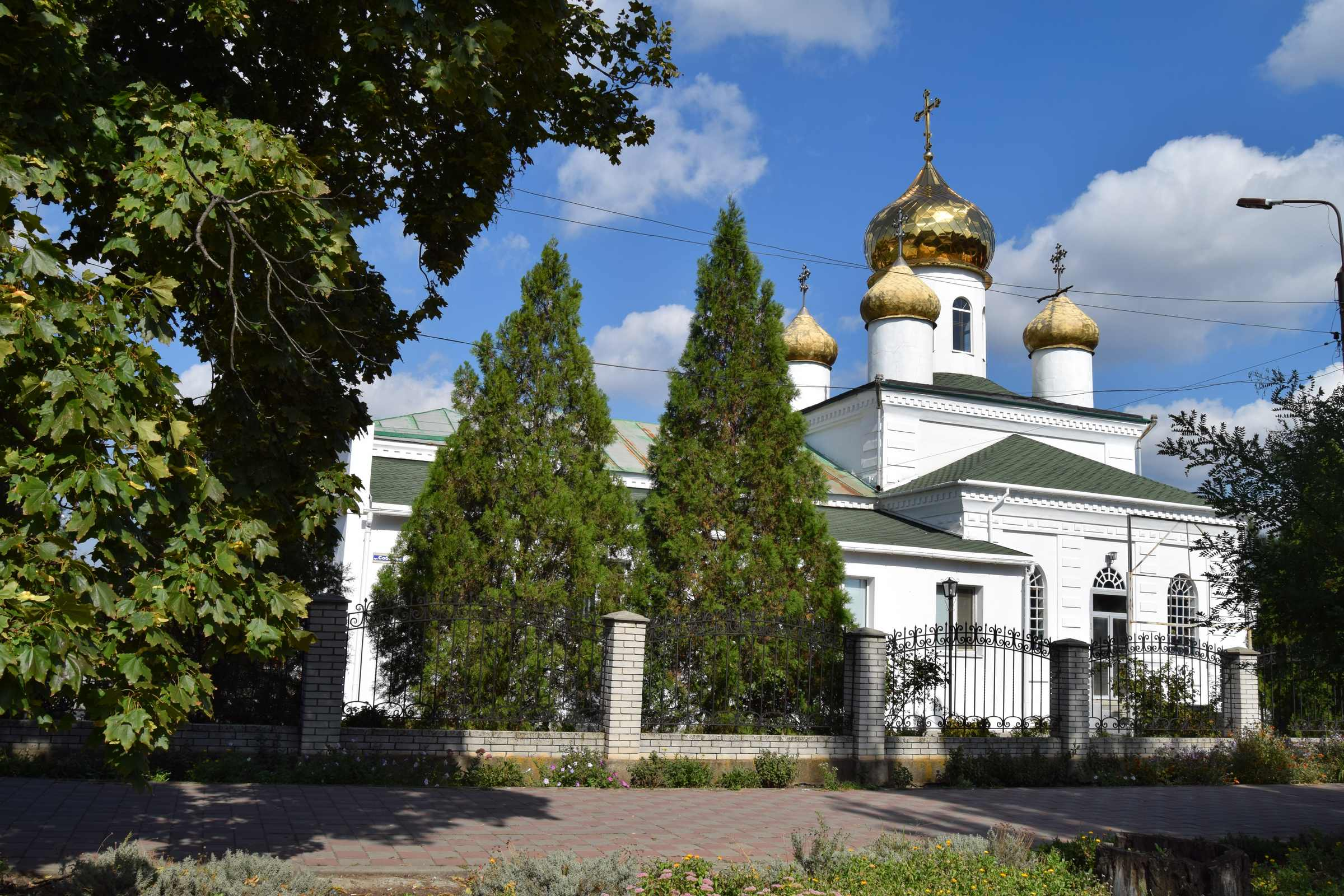
St. Vladimir's Church

- St. Vladimir's Church of the Ukrainian Orthodox Church
- Two Evangelical Christian Baptist Churches
- Seventh-day Adventist Church
- Victory Christian Church
- Bethany Church

== Gallery ==
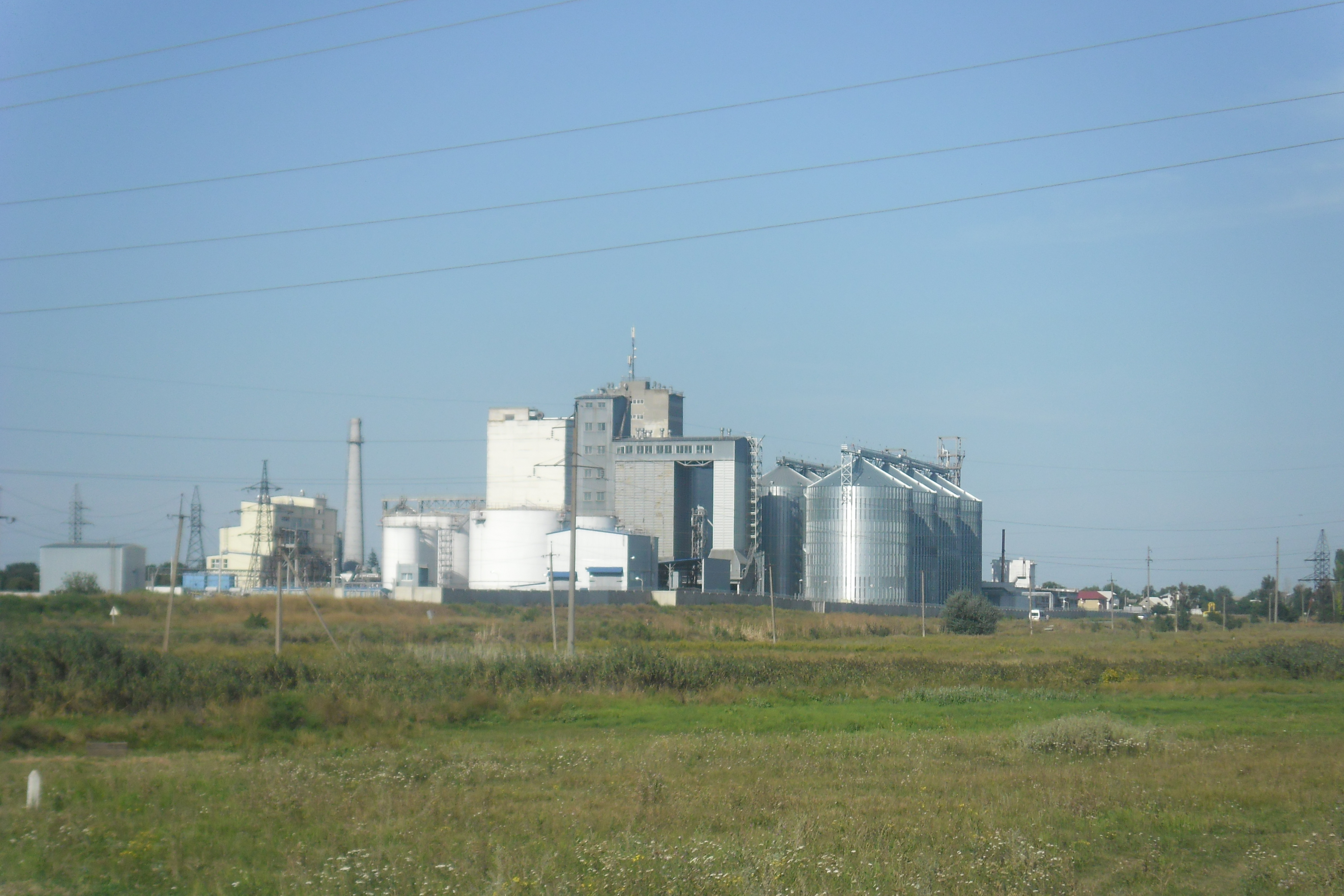
Industrial enterprise in Vilniansk

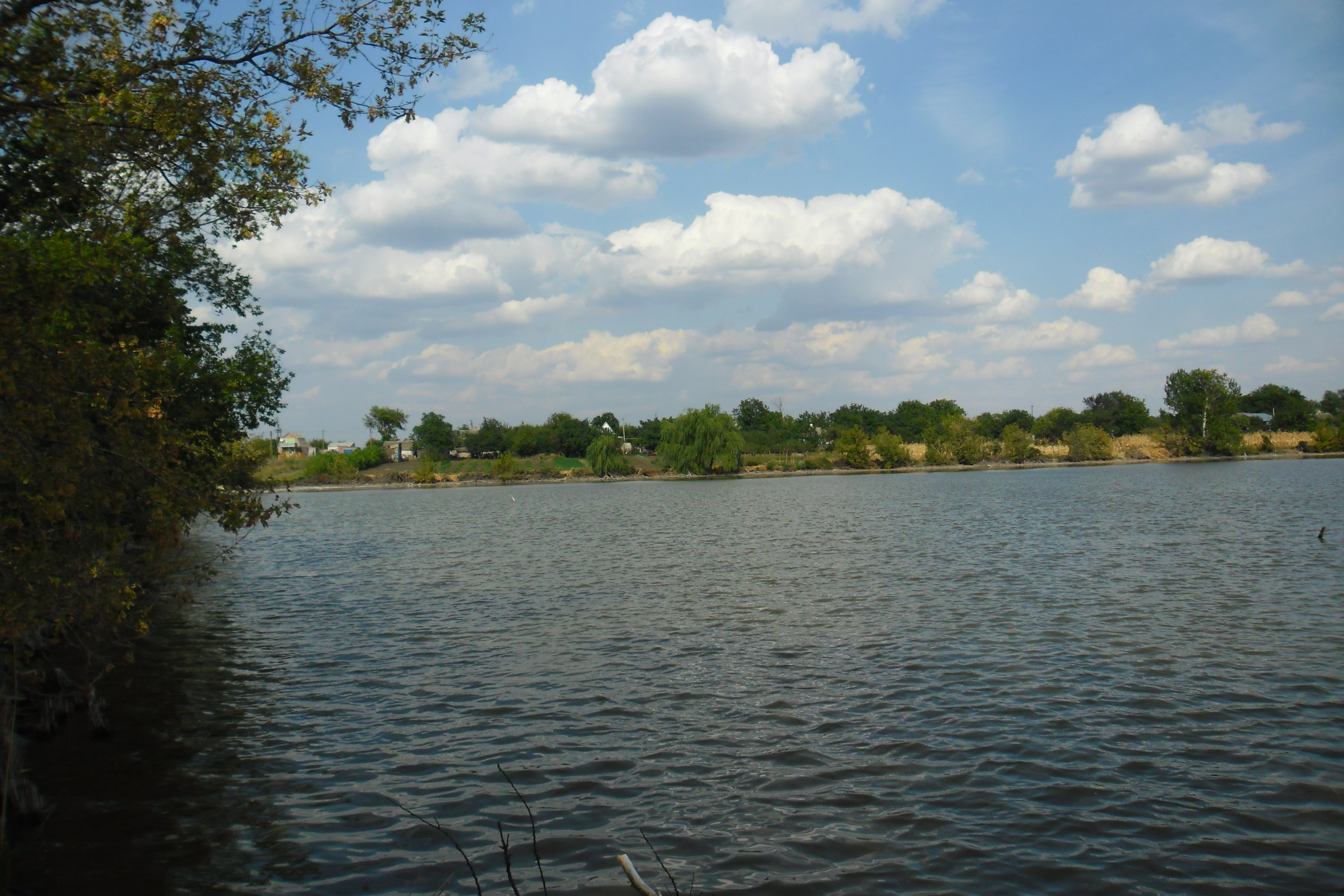
Vilnianka River

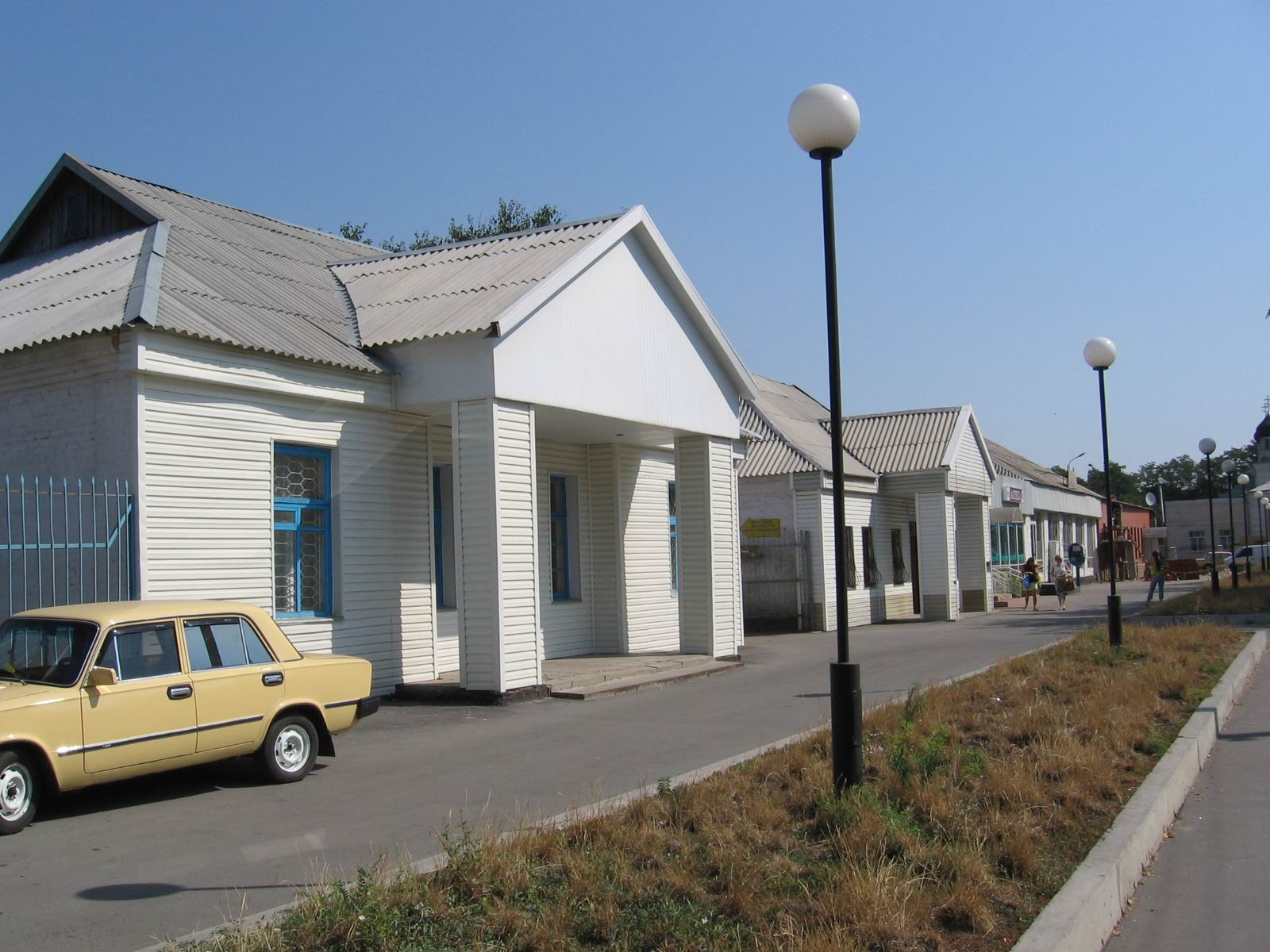
Old city center of Vilniansk

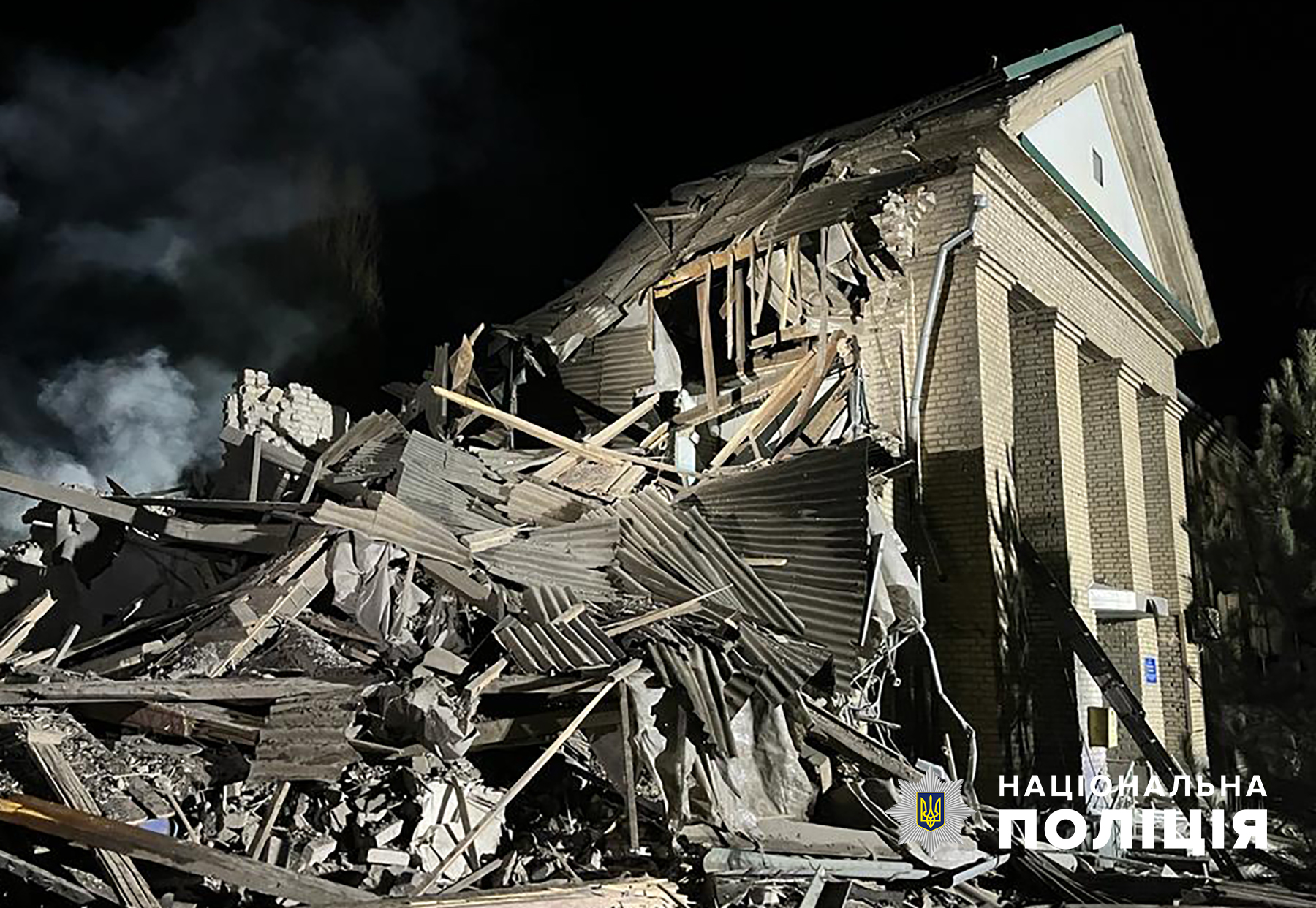
Hospital in Vilniansk after Russian shelling, 2022

== Notable people ==
- Eduard Sobol (* 1995), football player
- Avramenko Natalia – Ukrainian doctor and politician. Honored Doctor of Ukraine.
- Voloshchuk Mykhailo (1980–2014) – Lieutenant Colonel of the Ukrainian Armed Forces, fighter of the Ukrainian Volunteer Corps "Right Sector".
- Taryanyk Vasyl (1908–1989) – film director.
- Khomyak Kateryna (1922–2018) – actress of the Maria Sankovetska Theater (Lviv), Honored Artist of Ukraine.
- Syrota Mykola (1924–2003) – Honorary Citizen of the City of Vilna, a leading figure who served for over 22 years as director of the city-forming Vilna Shevchenko Plant.
- Bilai Ananiy – Ukrainian agronomist and gardener.
- Volodymyr Biletskyy – Ukrainian mining scientist, public and political figure, Doctor of Technical Sciences, professor, full member of several scientific and academic organizations.
- Lyubasenko Valentyn (1925–2007) – surgeon, World War II participant, recipient of the Order.
- Heinrich Neufeld – owner and manager of the agricultural machinery factory in Sofiyivka (Vilniansk, Zaporizhzhia region) since 1871.
- Serdyuk Vadym – Ukrainian sportsman, master of sports in sports tourism.
