= Novomykolaivka Raion =

Former subdivision of Zaporizhzhia Oblast, Ukraine

Novomykolaivka Raion Новомиколаївський район
- Raion
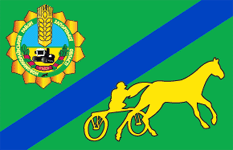
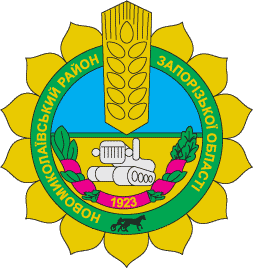
- Flag Coat of arms

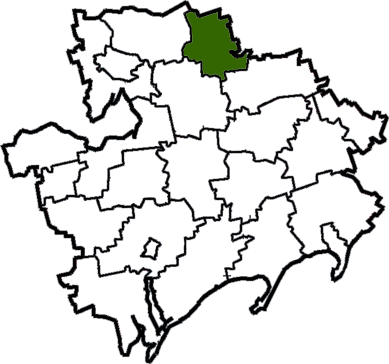
- Coordinates: 47°53′39.11″N 35°54′47.4″E
- Country: Ukraine
- Region: Zaporizhzhia Oblast
- Established: 1923
- Disestablished: 18 July 2020
- Admin. center: Novomykolaivka
- Subdivisions: List: 0 — city councils; 2 — settlement councils; 13 — rural councils; Number of localities: 0 — cities; 2 — urban-type settlements; 67 — villages; — rural settlements

Government
  - Governor: Oleksandr Manuylov

Area
  - Total: 915 km^{2} (353 sq mi)

Population (2020)
  - Total: 15,068 ▼
  - Density: 16.5/km^{2} (42.7/sq mi)
- Time zone: UTC+02:00 (EET)
  - Summer (DST): UTC+03:00 (EEST)
- Postal index: 70100—70153
- Area code: +380 6144
- Website: http://www.nmrda.gov.ua

Novomykolaivka Raion (Ukrainian: Новомиколаївський район, Novomykolajivs'kyj rajon) was one of raions (districts) of Zaporizhzhia Oblast in southern Ukraine. The administrative center of the raion was the urban-type settlement of Novomykolaivka. The raion was abolished on 18 July 2020 as part of the administrative reform of Ukraine, which reduced the number of raions of Zaporizhzhia Oblast to five. The area of Novomykolaivka Raion was merged into Zaporizhzhia Raion. The last estimate of the raion population was 15,068 (2020 est.)
