= Vilniansk Raion =

Former subdivision of Zaporizhzhia Oblast, Ukraine

Vilniansk Raion Вільнянський район
- Raion
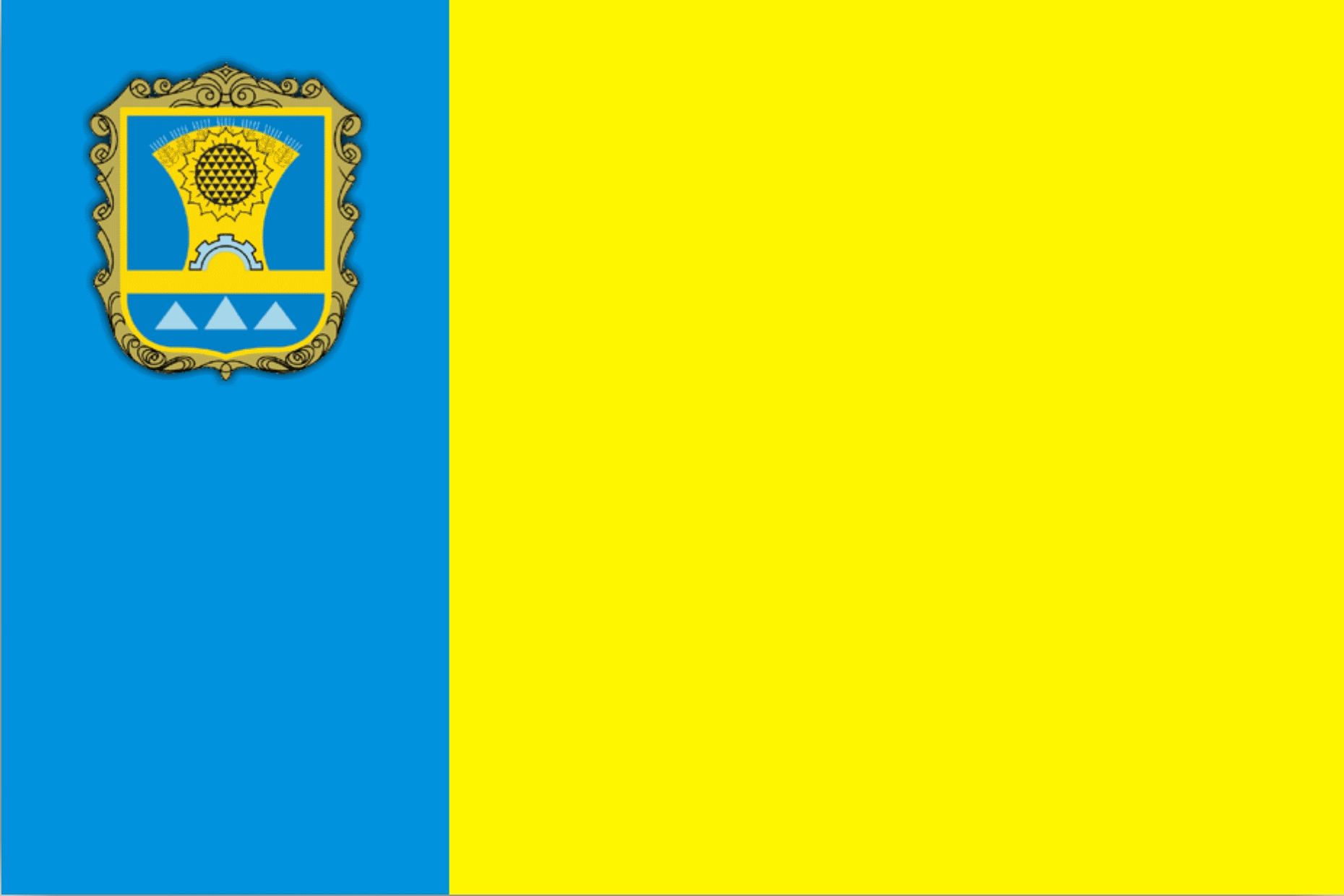
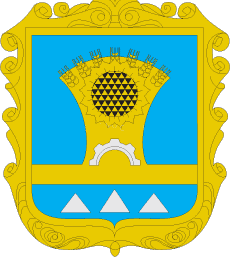
- Flag Coat of arms

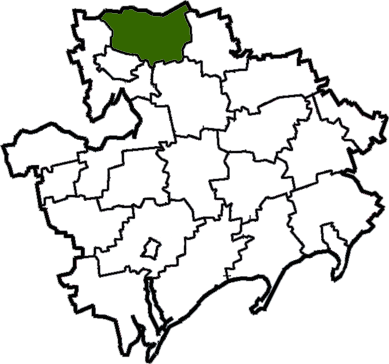
- Coordinates: 48°0′44″N 35°22′56.16″E
- Country: Ukraine
- Oblast: Zaporizhzhia Oblast
- Established: 1924
- Disestablished: 18 July 2020
- Admin. center: Vilniansk
- Subdivisions: List: 1 — city councils; 1 — settlement councils; 19 — rural councils; Number of localities: 1 — cities; 1 — urban-type settlements; 105 — villages; — rural settlements

Government
  - Governor: Volodymyr Chernilyuh

Area
  - Total: 1,280 km^{2} (490 sq mi)

Population (2020)
  - Total: 45,621 ▼
  - Density: 35.6/km^{2} (92.3/sq mi)
- Time zone: UTC+02:00 (EET)
  - Summer (DST): UTC+03:00 (EEST)
- Postal index: 70000—70054
- Area code: +380 6143

Vilniansk Raion (Ukrainian: Вільнянський район) was one of raions (districts) of Zaporizhzhia Oblast in southern Ukraine. The administrative center of the region was the town of Vilniansk. The raion was abolished on 18 July 2020 as part of the administrative reform of Ukraine, which reduced the number of raions of Zaporizhzhia Oblast to five.The area of Vilniansk Raion was merged into Zaporizhzhia Raion. The last estimate of the raion population was 45,621 (2020 est.).
