= Zelenyi Hai, Melitopol Raion, Zaporizhzhia Oblast =

Zelenyi Hai Зелений Гай
- Village
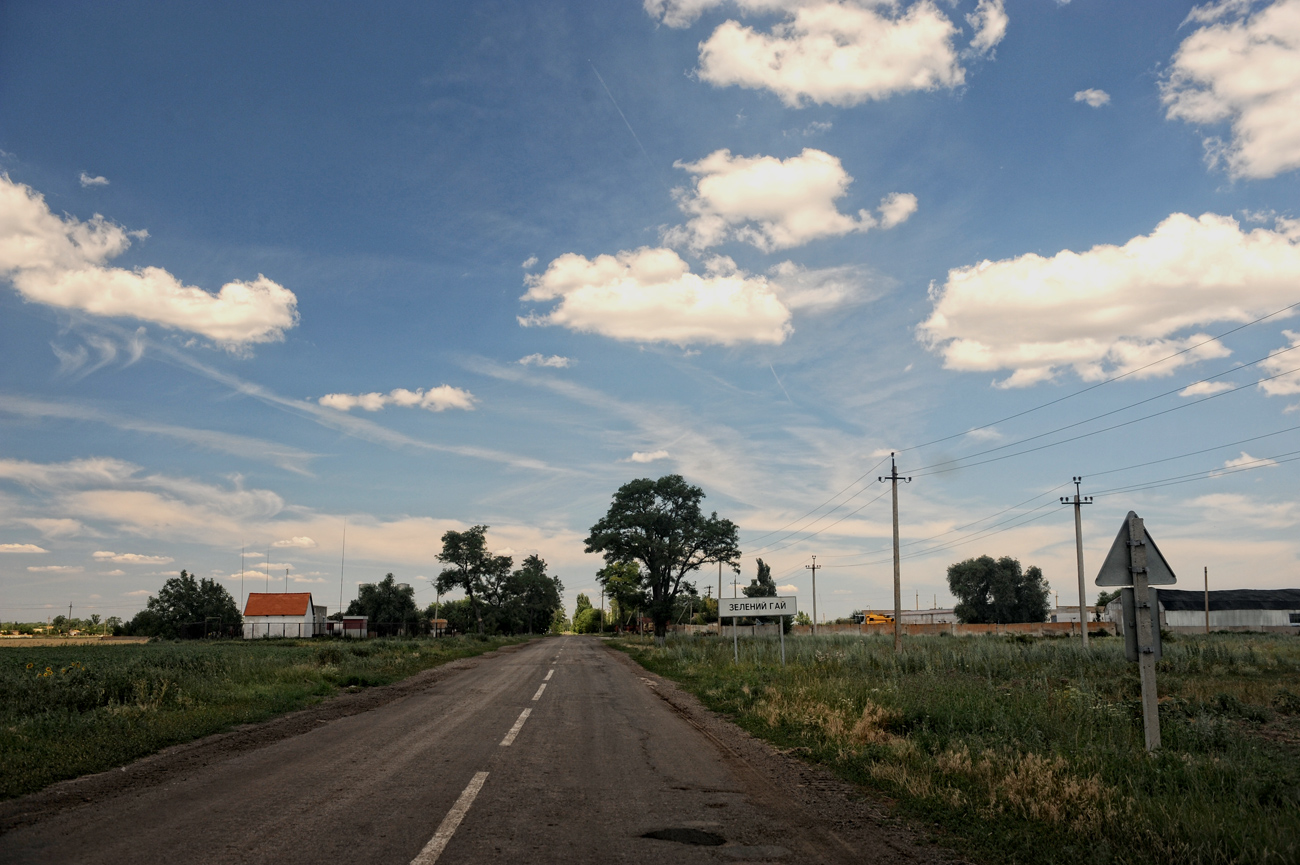

- Location of Zelenyi Hai in Zaporizhzhia Oblast Zelenyi Hai (Ukraine)
- Coordinates: 47°01′05″N 34°42′40″E
- Country: Ukraine
- Oblast: Zaporizhzhia Oblast
- District: Melitopol Raion
- Hromada: Havrylivka rural hromada
- Founded: 1926

Area
  - Total: 1.37 km^{2} (0.53 sq mi)
- Elevation: 76 m (249 ft)

Population (2001)
  - Total: 641
  - Density: 468/km^{2} (1,210/sq mi)
- Time zone: UTC+2 (EET)
  - Summer (DST): UTC+3 (EEST)
- Postal code: 72231
- Area code: +380 6136
- Climate: Dfa

Zelenyi Hai (Ukrainian: Зелений Гай) is a village in the Melitopol Raion of Zaporizhzhia Oblast in southern Ukraine. It forms part of Havrylivka rural hromada, one of the hromadas of Ukraine.

Until 18 July 2020, Zelenyi Hai belonged to Vesele Raion. The raion was abolished that day as part of the administrative reform of Ukraine, which reduced the number of raions of Zaporizhzhia Oblast to five. The area of Vesele Raion was merged into Melitopol Raion.

== Demographics ==
As of the 2001 Ukrainian census, Zelenyi Hai had a population of 641 inhabitants. The linguistic composition of the settlement was:

Native languages in Zelenyi Hai
	percent
Ukrainian	92.7%
Russian	6.7%
others	0.6%
