= Dolynske, Melitopol Raion =

Village in Zaporizhia Oblast, Ukraine

Coordinates: 46.785°N 35.21°E

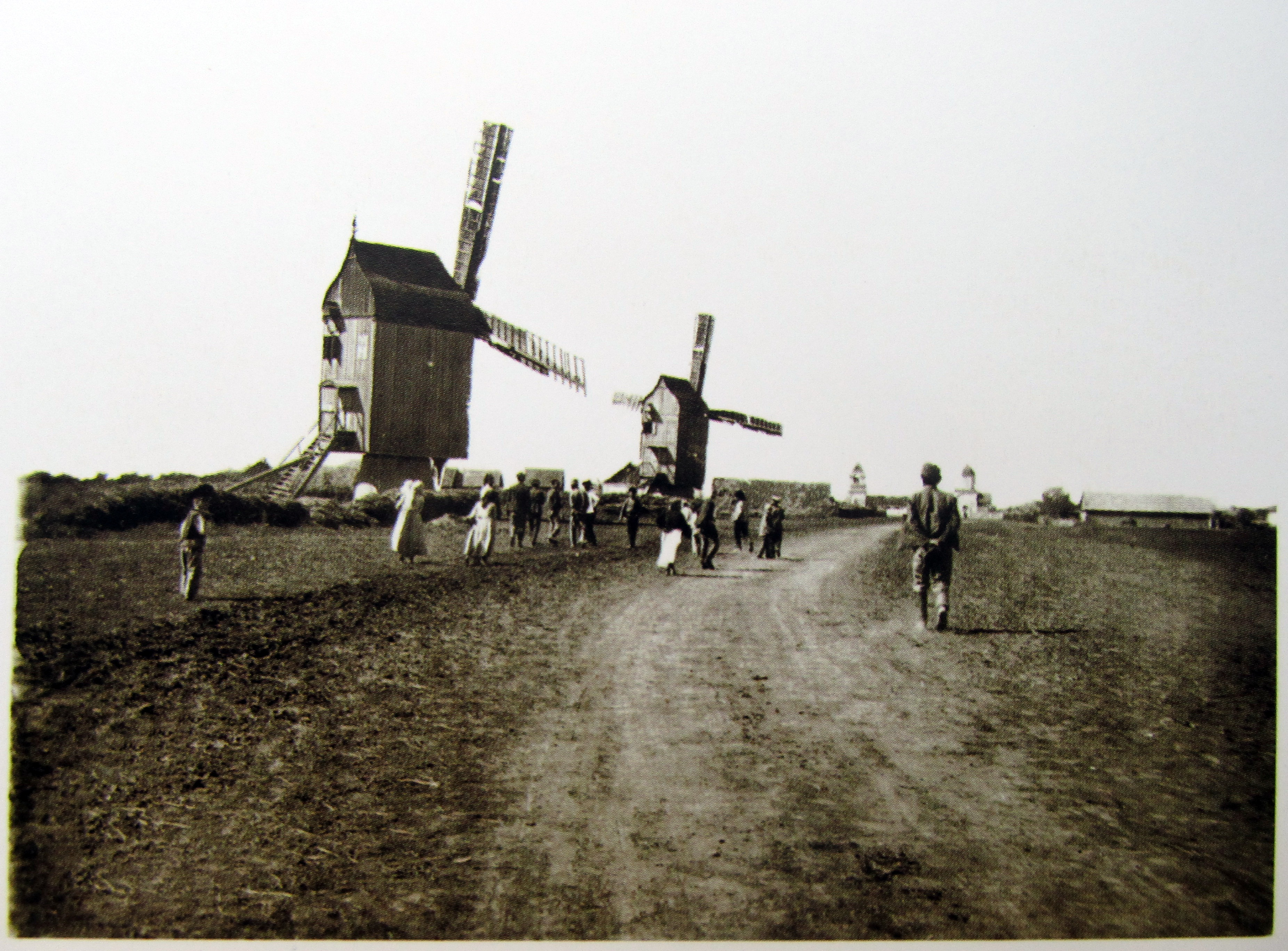
Windmills in German Lutheran

Dolynske is a village in Melitopol Raion, Zaporizhia Oblast, Ukraine, some 20 km west of Melitopol. It was originally a Hutterite village and until 1945 was known as Johannesruh or Johannesruhe.

The village was founded in 1852/3 by 17 Hutterites families from Hutterthal, some 4 km south of the new village. It was named after Johann Cornies, who had helped the Hutterites to relocate from Radichev. In 1857 some 35 Hutterite families under the leadership of Georg Waldner (1794–1857) left Johannesruh and moved to Hutterdorf, where they had purchased 1,500 desiatinas of land to reestablish communal living. In 1877 the German inhabitants of Johannesruh migrated to the United States.

== See also ==
- Kyrpychne, Melitopol Raion
