= 140th Marine Reconnaissance Battalion (Ukraine) =

140th Separate Marine Reconnaissance Battalion
- 140-й окремий розвідувальний батальйон
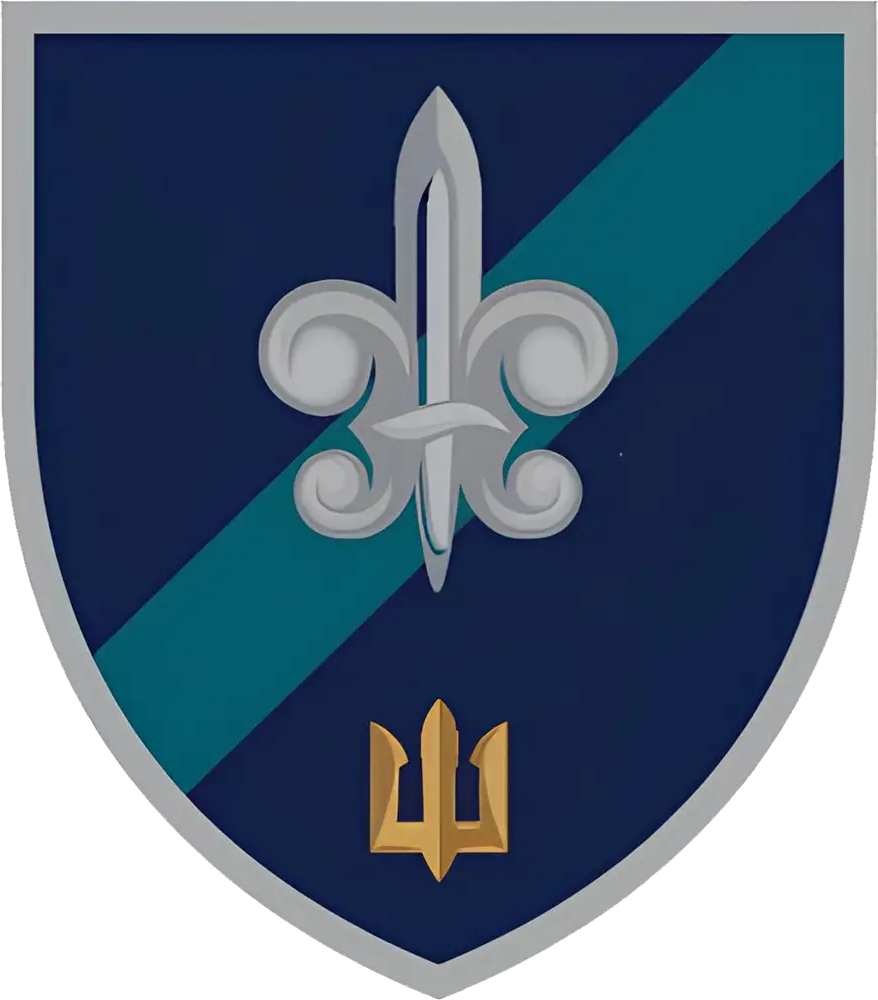
- Battalion insignia
- Active: 2019-present
- Country: Ukraine
- Branch: Ukrainian Marine Corps
- Type: Marines
- Role: Reconnaissance
- Size: Battalion
- Part of: 30th Marine Corps
- Garrison/HQ: Skadovsk
- Mottos: "Quiet vigilance, quick actions"
- Engagements: Russo-Ukrainian War: War in Donbass; 2022 Russian Invasion of Ukraine
- Decorations: 7× (III); 2× (II); 28× (III); 25× ; 23× ; 2×

Insignia
- Alternative Insignia

- Flag

Aircraft flown
- Reconnaissance: ASU-1 "Valkyrie"

The 140th Separate Marine Reconnaissance Battalion is a marine reconnaissance battalion of the Ukrainian Marine Corps established in 2019 as an independent unit subordinated directly to the Marine Corps Command and has seen combat during both the War in Donbass and the Russo-Ukrainian war, performing combat and ISTAR for military intelligence operations throughout the entire front.

== History ==
It was officially established on 1 February 2019 by the Ukrainian Marine Corps Commander Lieutenant General Yu.I. Sodol with its headquarters being the "White Wings" camp complex in Skadovsk community, in the immediate vicinity of the Russian occupied Crimea to conduct observation of Russian actions in the air, land and water near Crimea as well as taking part in international cooperation measures, conducting international exercises,defense and protection of important sites.

In November 2020, the battalion started participating in the War in Donbass as a part of Joint Forces Operation and was fully involved in combat since August 2021.

During the Russo-Ukrainian war, the battalion saw combat in Zachativka with a soldier (Gevak Anton) being killed in action on 5 March 2022, while facing a column of tanks and conducting a solo assault destroying a tank using a NLAW and another soldier (Gizimchuk Volodymyr Mykolayovych) being killed in action on 9 March. The battalion also operated in Krasna Poliana, Donetsk Oblast where a soldier (Yury Duman) was killed in action on 10 March 2022. The battalion also saw combat in Solodke in April 2022 with a soldier (Serhii Volodymyrovych Hryshchuk) being killed in action on 3 April. In October 2022, it saw intensive action in Donetsk Oblast with two soldiers (Vladyslav Volodymyrovych Martyniuk and Kolomiets Oleg Volodymyrovych) being killed in combat on 13 October. On 17 November 2022, while performing combat reconnaissance operations in Donetsk Oblast and Luhansk Oblast, two soldiers of the battalion (Volodymyr Gennadiyovych Ovchynnikov) was killed in combat operations near Dibrova in the Luhansk Oblast and another soldier (Anton Tsvetkov)) was killed in action, the same day in Donetsk Oblast. On December 6, 2022, the 140th Separate Reconnaissance Battalion received the Combat Flag. In December 2022, the battalion fought in Lymanske with a soldier (Tymofiy Semka) being killed on 24 December 2022.

On 17 May 2023, while operating in Donetsk Oblast, a soldier of the battalion (V'yacheslav Volodymyrovych Chekmaryov) was killed in combat. On May 23, 2023, the battalion was awarded the honorary award "For Courage and Bravery." In October 2023, the battalion saw combat in Kherson Oblast as a part of the 2023 Ukrainian Counteroffensive. The battalion took part in combat operations in Oleshky and on 5 December 2023, a soldier of the battalion (Valeriy Volodymyrovych Galushko) was killed in a battle near Tsyurupinsk.

On 8 July 2024, the commander of the battalion's radio communication (Vasyl Lema) was killed in combat.

== Commanders ==
- Oleksandr Mykolayovych Staryna

== Structure ==
- Intelligence Company
- UAV Company "Valkyrie"
- Electronic Intelligence Company
- Artillery and Fire Support Company
- Guard and Protection Unit
