= Limansky =

Limansky may refer to:

- Limansky District, a district of Astrakhan Oblast, Russia
- Limansky (rural locality), name of several rural localities in Russia

== See also ==
- Limanskaya, a related term
- Lymanske (disambiguation) (Limanskoye in Russian), the name of several places in Ukraine
