= Pryazovia National Nature Park =

National park in Ukraine

- Ukrainian: Приазовський національний природний парк
- IUCN category II (national park)
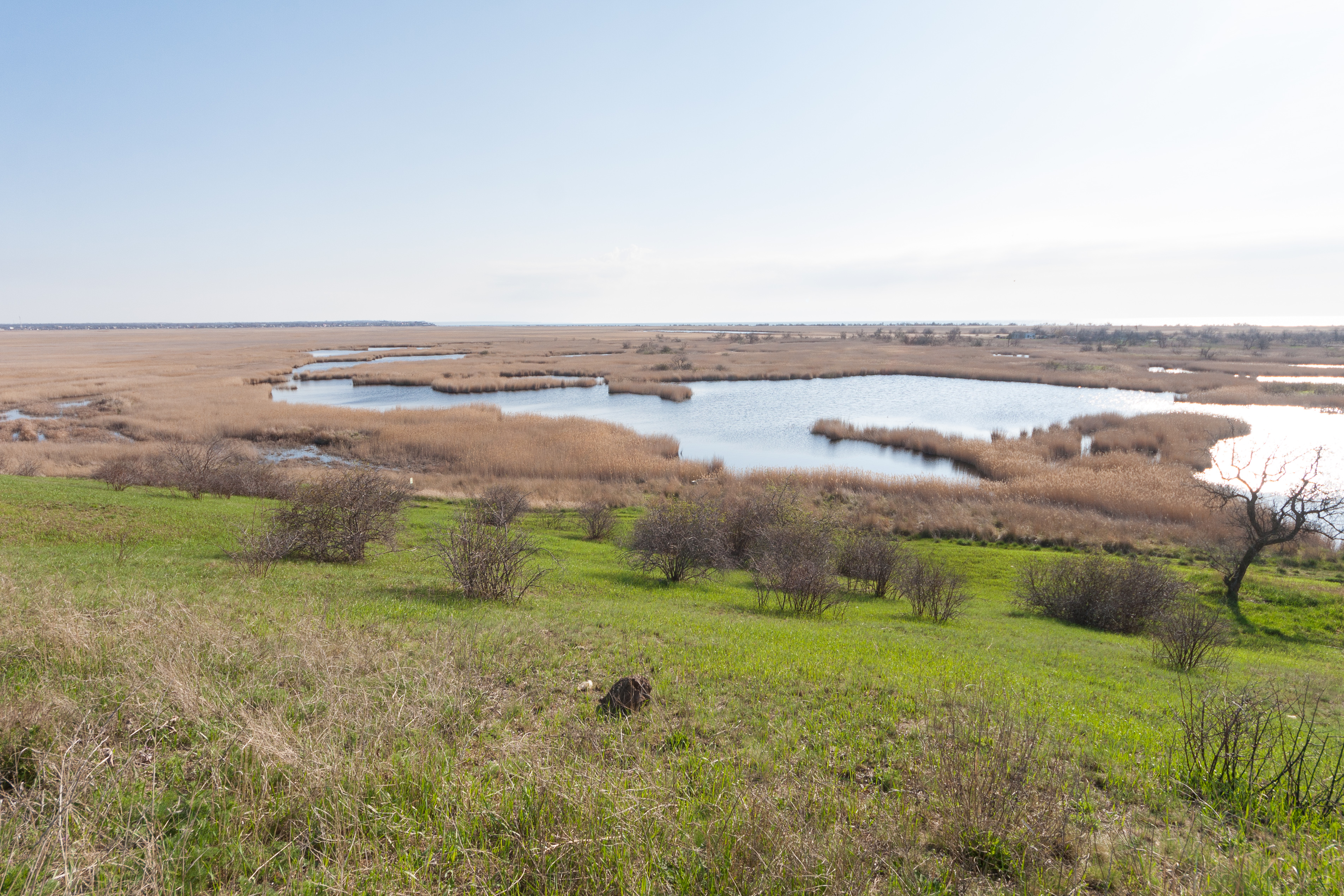
- Berda River floodplain

- Location within Ukraine
- Location: Zaporizhzhia Oblast
- Nearest city: Berdiansk
- Coordinates: 46°50′25″N 35°21′32″E
- Area: 78,126.92 hectares (193,056 acres; 781 km^{2}; 302 sq mi)
- Established: 2010
- Governing body: Ministry of Ecology and Natural Resources (Ukraine)
- Website: http://pnpp.info/

The Pryazovia National Nature Park or Pryazovskyi National Nature Park (Ukrainian: Приазовський національний природний парк; Russian: Приазовский национальный природный парк, romanized: Priazovsky natsionalny prirodny park) is the second largest national park of Ukraine, covering the estuaries, coastal plains seaside landforms around the Molochna River estuary the Utlyuksky estuary, on the northwest coast of the Sea of Azov in Pryazovia. The area is one of high biodiversity, protecting both steppe and aquatic habitats, and the unique transition zones in between. The wetlands support very large populations of nesting and migratory waterfowl. The park crosses Melitopol Raion and Berdiansk Raion in Zaporizhzhia Oblast.

== Topography ==
Pryazovia NPP is a coastal strip on the northwest of the Azov Sea, about 20 miles south of the city of Melitopol. The area's estuaries (limans) are about 80% land and 20% water. The habits themselves show great diversity: steppe, coastal plain, floodplain swamps, estuaries with variable salinity, spits, peninsulas, sandy-shell islands, dunes and saline lakes. The largest river through the park is the Molochnyi River, which forms a saline liman (lagoon) off the Azov Sea. The park is connected by the thin Fedotova Spit to Biryuchyi Island in the Azov-Syvash National Nature Park.

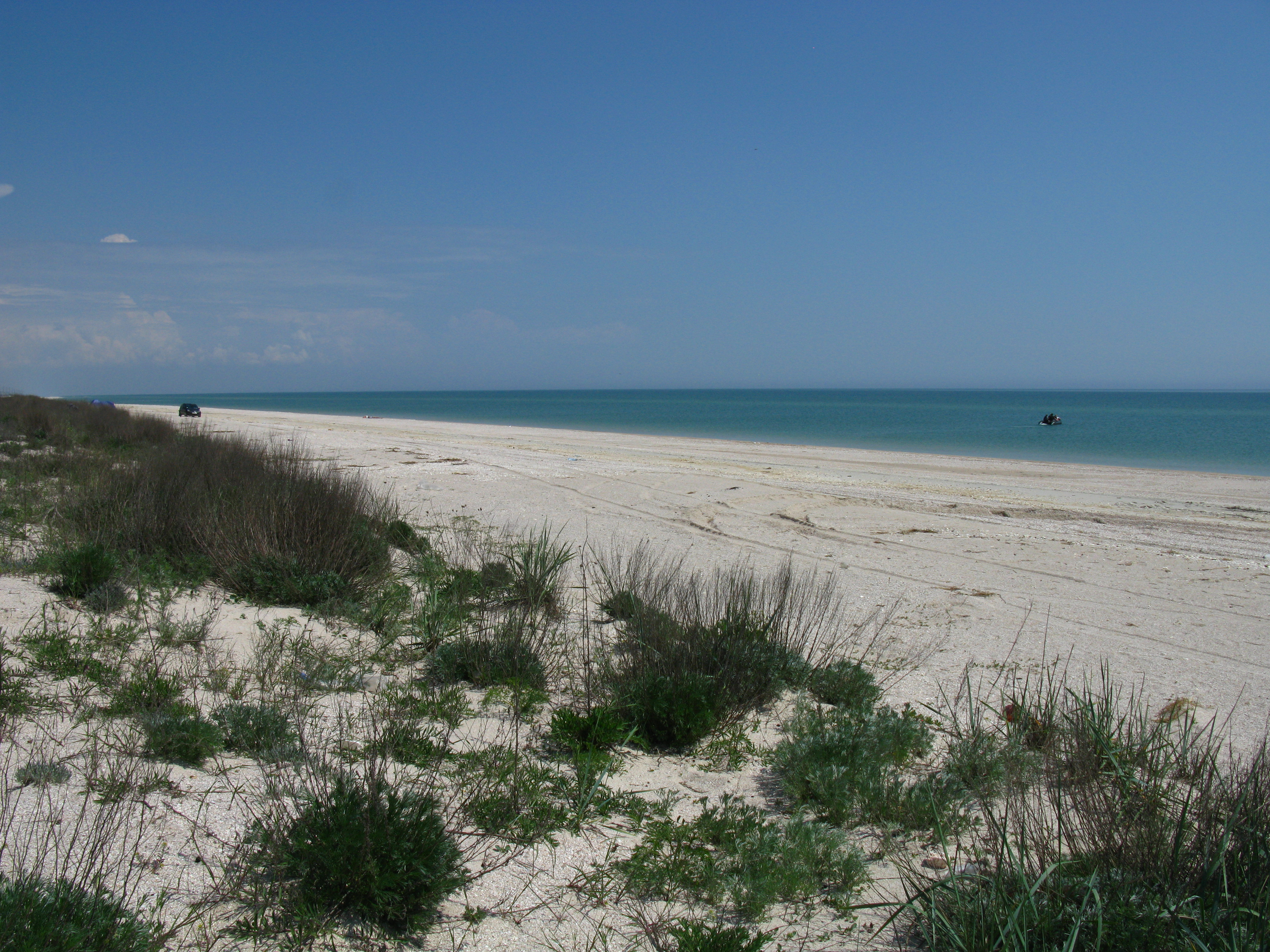
Beach on the Fedotova Spit, Pryazovia NNP

== Climate and ecoregion ==
The climate of Pryazovia NPP is Humid continental climate - Hot summer sub-type (Köppen climate classification Dfa), with large seasonal temperature differentials and a hot summer (at least one month averaging over 22 °C (72 °F), mild winters, and relatively even precipitation through the year (no dry season). Precipitation in the park averages 300–400 mm/year, and evaporation is 800–900 mm/year. The temperature of the water ranges up to 30 °C (86 °F) in June.

Pryazovia NNP is located in the Pontic–Caspian steppe ecoregion, a region that covers an expanse of grasslands stretching from the northern shores of the Black Sea to western Kazakhstan.

== Park Development ==
As a national park, Pryazovia is laid out in zones providing for both protection and recreation.

- Protected zone: 8561 hectares (10%)
- "Stationary recreation" zone: 665 hectares (1%);
- "Regulated recreation" zone: - 7082 hectares (9%);
- Economic zone: 62,943 hectares (80%).

Pryazovia includes two wetlands of international importance "Ramsar sites": "Molochnyi Lyman" (Milky River Delta), and "Berda River Mouth & Berdianska Spit & Berdianska Bay".

== Tourism and Recreation ==
There are two resort villages on the coast in the region: the village of Kyrylivka, and the tourism-oriented city of Berdiansk. The area is accessible by rail, and is a popular beach destination, with a variety of spas and recreational facilities. The area is known for mineral waters, medicinal muds, and a healthy climate. Scientists from the park provide educational programs for the local public and schools.

== See also ==
- National Parks of Ukraine
