= Myrne =

Myrne may refer to:

== Places ==
- Myrne, Myrne settlement hromada, Volnovakha Raion, Donetsk Oblast
- Myrne, Skadovsk Raion, Kherson Oblast
- Myrne, Bilozerka settlement hromada, Kherson Raion, Kherson Oblast
- Myrne, Vynohradove rural hromada, Kherson Raion, Kherson Oblast
- Myrne, Luhansk Oblast
- Myrne, Izmail Raion, Odesa Oblast
- Myrne, Orikhiv urban hromada, Polohy Raion, Zaporizhzhia Oblast
- Myrne, Myrne settlement hromada, Melitopol Raion, Zaporizhzhia Oblast
- Myrne settlement hromada (disambiguation), several hromadas of Ukraine

== People ==
- Myrne (musician) (born 1995), Singaporean DJ and producer
