= Solodke, Melitopol Raion, Zaporizhzhia Oblast =

Solodke Солодке
- Village
- Location of Solodke in Zaporizhzhia Oblast Solodke (Ukraine)
- Coordinates: 47°08′44″N 35°11′40″E
- Country: Ukraine
- Oblast: Zaporizhzhia Oblast
- District: Melitopol Raion
- Hromada: Plodorodne rural hromada
- Founded: 1921

Area
  - Total: 0.78 km^{2} (0.30 sq mi)
- Elevation: 72 m (236 ft)

Population (2001)
  - Total: 139
  - Density: 180/km^{2} (460/sq mi)
- Time zone: UTC+2 (EET)
  - Summer (DST): UTC+3 (EEST)
- Postal code: 72045
- Area code: +380 6132
- Climate: Dfa

Solodke (Ukrainian: Солодке) is a village (a selo) in the Melitopol Raion (district) of Zaporizhzhia Oblast in southern Ukraine. It forms part of Plodorodne rural hromada, one of the hromadas of Ukraine.

Until 18 July 2020, Solodke belonged to Mykhailivka Raion. The raion was abolished in July 2020 as part of the administrative reform of Ukraine, which reduced the number of raions of Zaporizhzhia Oblast to five. The area of Mykhailivka Raion was merged into Vasylivka Raion, but Solodke was transferred to Melitopol Raion.
