= Huttertal =

Village in Ukraine

Huttertal Гуттерталь
- Village
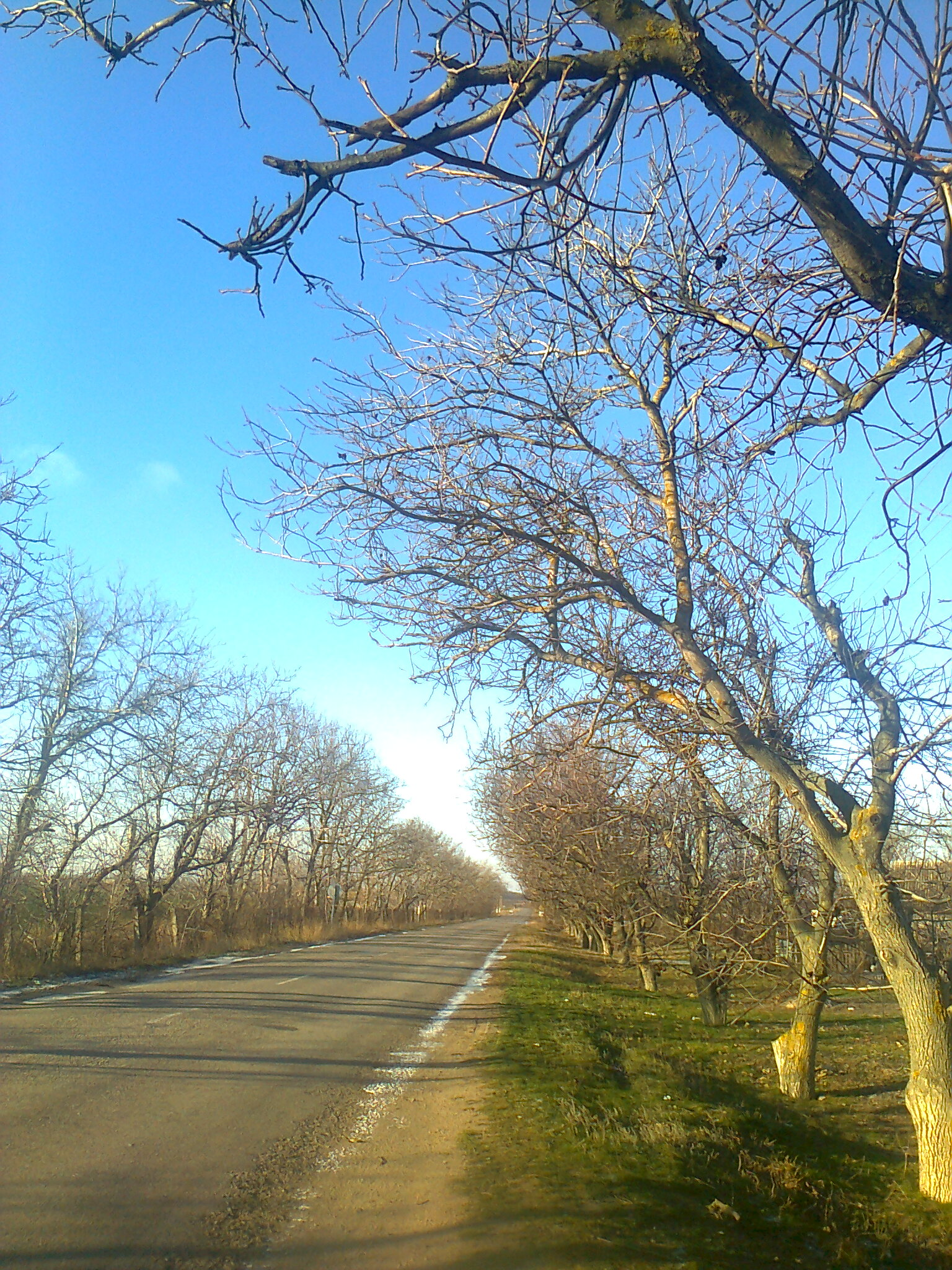
- Myru Street

- Location of Huttertal in Zaporizhzhia Oblast
- Coordinates: 46°44′45″N 35°12′11″E
- Country: Ukraine
- Oblast: Zaporizhzhia Oblast
- Raion: Zaporizhzhia Raion
- Hromada: Nove rural hromada
- Founded: 1842–3
- Elevation: 21 m (69 ft)

Population (2001)
  - Total: 239
- Time zone: UTC+2 (EET)
  - Summer (DST): UTC+3 (EEST)
- Postal code: 72383
- Area code: +380 6192

Huttertal (Ukrainian: Гуттерталь; German: Hutterthal), in 1945–2025 Kyrpychne (Кирпичне), is a village in Melitopol Raion, Zaporizhia Oblast, Ukraine, 20 km from Melitopol.

It was founded in 1842/3 as a Hutterite village. Johann Cornies, who had leased the tract of steppe-land on which Hutterthal was founded, helped the Hutterites to get a credit of 15,000 rubles and the grain necessary for the winter from the Russian crown. Every family got a piece of land of 65 desiatinas. The settlement prospered from the beginning and by 1846 the entire credit had been paid off. In the 1870s the Hutterites left the Russian Empire for the United States and the village was resettled by Lutheran Germans.

When the Hutterites settled at Hutterthal in 1842 they numbered 384 people, 185 males and 199 females in 69 families.

On 18 June 2025, the Verkhovna Rada renamed the village to Huttertal, as the name Kyrpychne did not match Ukrainian language standards.
