= Novouspenivka rural hromada =

Novouspenivka rural hromada Новоуспенівська селищна громада
- Hromada
- Interactive map of Novouspenivka rural hromada
- Country: Ukraine
- Oblast: Zaporizhzhia Oblast
- Raion: Melitopol Raion

Area
  - Total: 296.2 km^{2} (114.4 sq mi)

Population (2020)
  - Total: 3,472
  - Density: 11.72/km^{2} (30.36/sq mi)
- Settlements: 9
- Rural settlements: 1
- Villages: 8

Novouspenivka rural hromada (Ukrainian: Новоуспенівська селищна громада) is a hromada of Ukraine, located in Melitopol Raion, Zaporizhzhia Oblast. Its administrative center is the village of Novouspenivka.

It has an area of 296.2 square kilometres (114.4 mi^{2}) and a population of 3,472, as of 2020.

The hromada contains 9 settlements, including 8 villages:

- Bilivske
- Bratoliubivka
- Vesele
- Voskhod
- Zaporizhzhia
- Matviivka
- Novoivanivka
- Novouspenivka

And 1 rural-type settlement: Tavria.

== See also ==
- List of hromadas of Ukraine
