= Kyrylivka =

Rural locality in Zaporizhzhia Oblast, Ukraine

Kyrylivka Кирилівка
- Rural settlement
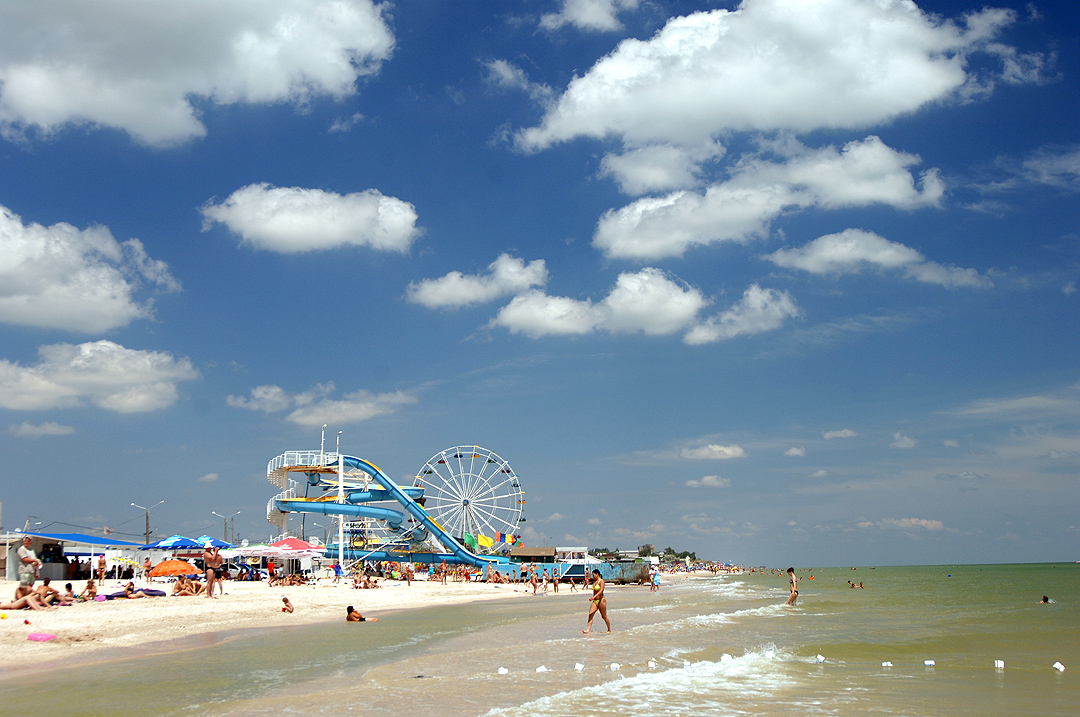

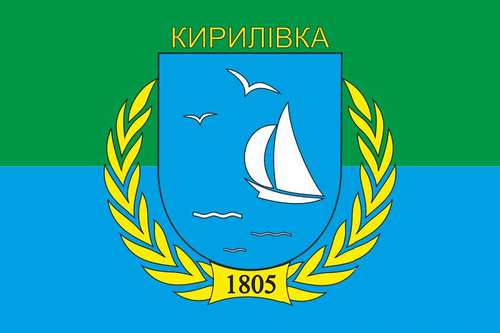
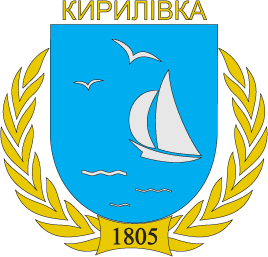
- Flag Coat of arms
- Interactive map of Kyrylivka
- Location of Kyrylivka in Zaporizhzhia Oblast Kyrylivka (Zaporizhzhia Oblast)
- Coordinates: 46°22′12″N 35°22′0″E
- Country: Ukraine
- Oblast: Zaporizhzhia Oblast
- Raion: Melitopol Raion
- Hromada: Kyrylivka settlement hromada
- Founded: 1805
- Settlement status: 1967

Area
  - Total: 1,654 km^{2} (639 sq mi)
- Elevation: 10 m (33 ft)

Population (2022)
  - Total: 3,416 ▼
  - Density: 2.065/km^{2} (5.349/sq mi)
- Time zone: UTC+2 (EET)
  - Summer (DST): UTC+3 (EEST)
- Postal code: 72563
- Area code: +380 6131
- Website: krlk.gov.ua

Kyrylivka (Ukrainian: Кирилівка, IPA: [kɪˈrɪl⁽ʲ⁾iu̯kɐ]) is a rural settlement in Melitopol Raion, Zaporizhzhia Oblast, southern Ukraine. It hosts the administration of Kyrylivka settlement hromada, one of the hromadas of Ukraine. The town is located on the northern coast of the Sea of Azov and surrounded by both Utliuk Lyman and Molochnyi Lyman. Some of its areas are part of Pryazovia National Nature Park. Population: 3,416 (2022 estimate).

== History ==
The area was settled by Doukhobors in 1805 under the Russian Empire. Kyrylo Kapustin became the first inhabitant and the village was named after him.

In 1838, the population of Kyrylivka increased to 130 people. After some time, local Doukhobors were exiled to the Caucasus, except those who have returned to the Russian Orthodox Church.

In 1926, the sanatorium of Kyrylivka was founded after a mud bath clinic opened. From there on, Kyrylivka began to develop as a resort destination.

In 1968, the village received the status of urban-type settlement.

As of the 2001 Ukrainian census, it had a population of 1,481.

During the opening days of the 2022 Russian invasion of Ukraine, Kyrylivka was occupied by Russian forces shortly after the Battle of Melitopol.

On 26 January 2024, a new law entered into force in Ukraine that abolished urban-type settlements. As a result, Kyrylivka became a rural settlement.

On 25 July 2026, Russian officials said that a Ukrainian drone strike on a holiday camp in Kyrylivka killed at least twelve people, including five children.

== Climate ==
Climate data for Kyrylivka (1991-2020 normals)
Month	Jan	Feb	Mar	Apr	May	Jun	Jul	Aug	Sep	Oct	Nov	Dec	Year
Daily mean °C (°F)	−3.4 (25.9)	−2.8 (27.0)	2.3 (36.1)	9.5 (49.1)	15.6 (60.1)	19.9 (67.8)	22.2 (72.0)	21.6 (70.9)	15.9 (60.6)	9.2 (48.6)	2.6 (36.7)	−1.8 (28.8)	9.2 (48.6)
Average precipitation mm (inches)	51 (2.0)	39 (1.5)	42 (1.7)	44 (1.7)	51 (2.0)	66 (2.6)	56 (2.2)	51 (2.0)	37 (1.5)	42 (1.7)	44 (1.7)	49 (1.9)	572 (22.5)
Average precipitation days (≥ 1 mm)	10	7	8	7	8	7	6	5	5	6	7	8	84
Source: NOAA

== Gallery ==
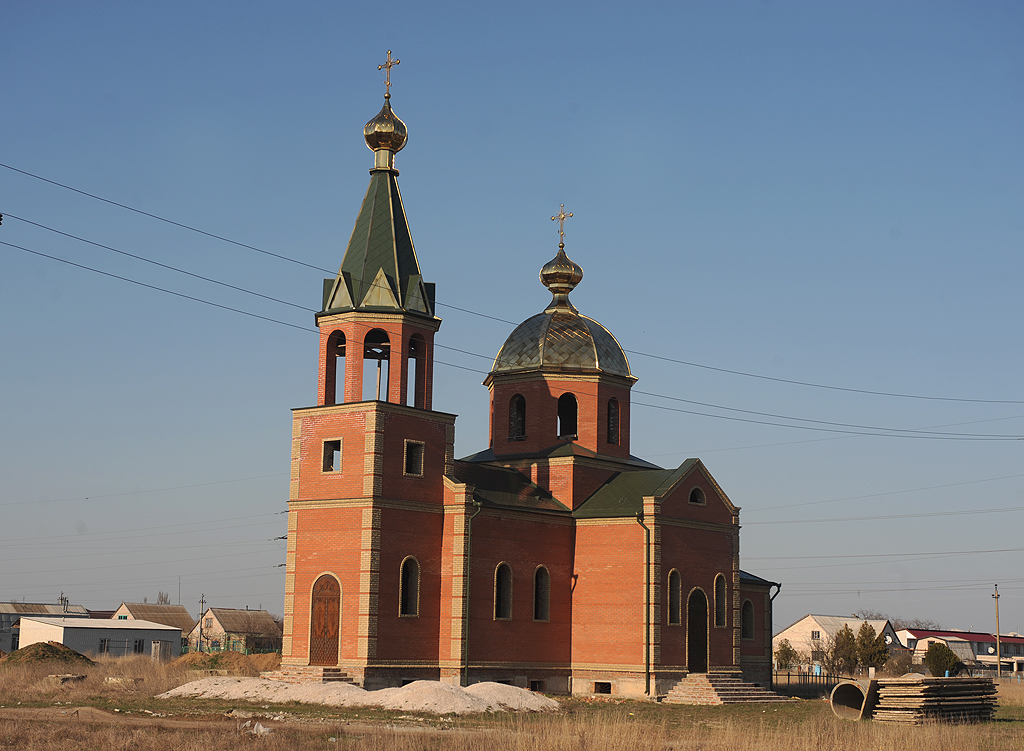

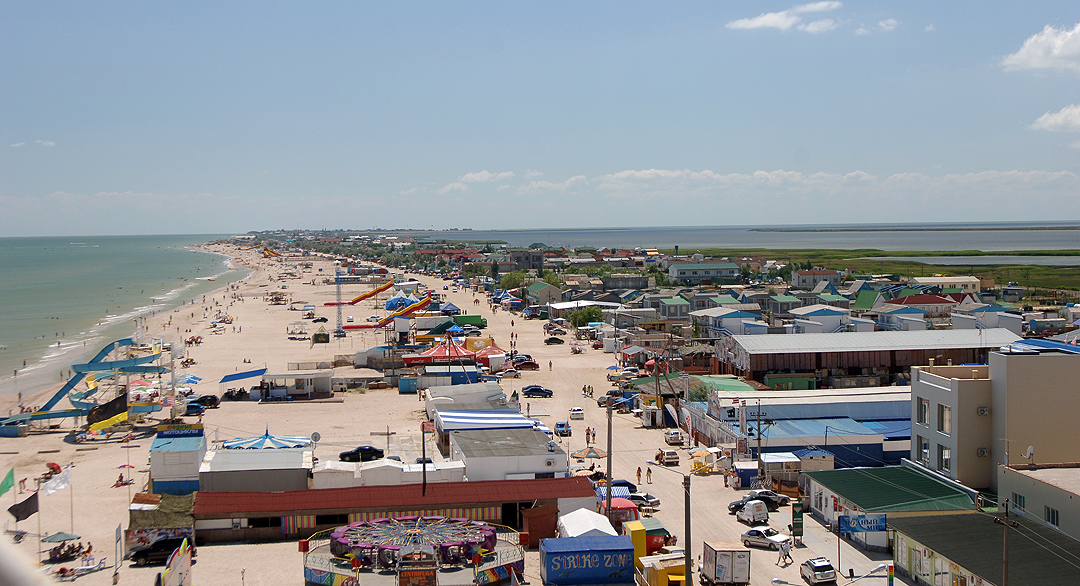

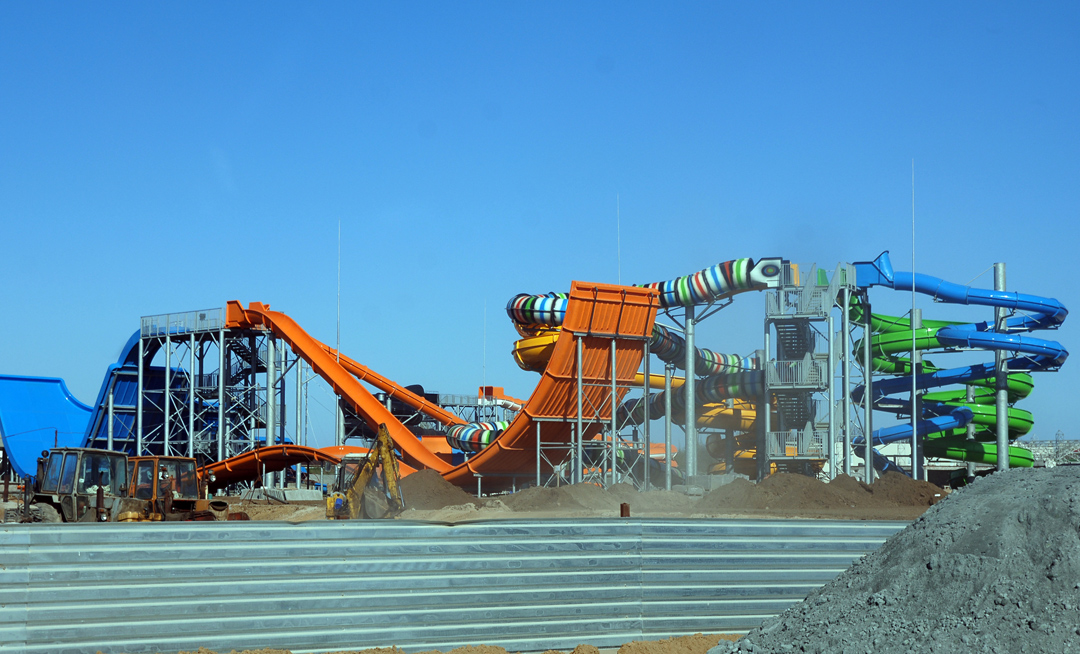
