= Novouspenivka =

Novouspenivka Новоуспенівка
- Location within Ukraine
- Coordinates: 47°03′00″N 35°01′51″E
- Country: Ukraine
- Oblast: Zaporizhzhia
- Raion: Melitopol
- Established: 1861

Government
  - Body: Novouspenivska village council

Area
  - Total: 3.57 km^{2} (1.38 sq mi)
  - Rural: 4,377 ha (10,820 acres)
- Elevation: 73 m (240 ft)

Population (2010)
  - Total: 831
  - Density: 233/km^{2} (603/sq mi)
- Postal code: 72220
- Area code: +380 613676

Novouspenivka (Ukrainian: Новоуспенівка) is a village in the Melitopol Raion of Zaporizhzhia Oblast, in Ukraine.

== Geography ==
The village of Novouspenivka is located at a distance of 0.5 km from the village of Novoivanivka and 6 km from the town of Vesele. The T0811 highway passes through the village. The railway passes nearby, the Ukrainska station is 2.5 km away.

== History ==
It was founded as the village of Yehorka (Ukrainian: Єгорка) in 1861 by natives of the village of Balky. Later it was renamed Suknovalivka (Ukrainian: Сукновалівка. In 1961, it received the modern name Novouspenivka.

As of 1886, 958 people lived in the village and there were 135 households.

According to the data of the State Archive of the Zaporizhzhia Region, and the testimony of eyewitnesses, 42 of the village's residents died during the Holodomor.

In 1962-1965, it belonged to the Mykhailivka Raion of the Zaporizhzhia Oblast, then it became part of the Vesele Raion.

== Demographics ==
According to the 1989 Soviet Census, the population of the village was 1,172, of which 534 were men and 638 were women.

According to the 2001 Ukrainian Census, 995 people lived in the village, and the distribution of the population by native language was:

| Language | Percentage |
|---|---|
| Ukrainian | 87.57% |
| Russian | 11.34% |
| Belarusian | 0.39% |
| Crimean Tatar | 0.10% |
| Other | 0.60% |
