= Petrivka =

Petrivka may refer to several places in Ukraine:

- Petrivka, Kyiv, the historical neighborhood in Ukrainian capital Kyiv, as well as some notable objects located there, including:
  - Petrivka Railway Station, railway station
- Petrivka, Kurman Raion, a village in Kurman Raion of Autonomous Republic of Crimea
- Petrivka, Simferopol Raion, a village in Simferopol Raion of Autonomous Republic of Crimea
- Petrivka, Koriukivka Raion, a village in Koriukivka Raion of Chernihiv Oblast
- Petrivka, Nizhyn Raion, a village in Nizhyn Raion of Chernihiv Oblast
- Petrivka, Pryluky Raion, a village in Pryluky Raion of Chernihiv Oblast
- Petrivka, Kryvyi Rih Raion, a village in Kryvyi Rih Raion of Dnipropetrovsk Oblast
- Petrivka, Nikopol Raion, a village in Nikopol Raion of Dnipropetrovsk Oblast
- Petrivka, Piatykhatky urban hromada, a village in Kamianske Raion of Dnipropetrovsk Oblast
- Petrivka, Synelnykove Raion, a village in Synelnykove Raion of Dnipropetrovsk Oblast
- Petrivka, Verkhivtseve urban hromada, a village in Kamianske Raion of Dnipropetrovsk Oblast
- Petrivka, Kramatorsk Raion, a village in Kramatorsk Raion in Donetsk Oblast
- Petrivka, Shakhove rural hromada, a village in Pokrovsk Raion in Donetsk Oblast
- Petrivka, Selydove urban hromada, a village in Pokrovsk Raion in Donetsk Oblast
- Petrivka, Volnovakha Raion, Donetsk Oblast, a village in Donetsk Oblast
- Petrivka, Kharkiv Raion, a village in Kharkiv Raion of Kharkiv Oblast
- Petrivka, Natalyne settlement hromada, a village in Berestyn Raion of Kharkiv Oblast
- Petrivka, Sakhnovshchyna settlement hromada, a village in Berestyn Raion of Kharkiv Oblast
- Petrivka, Zachepylivka settlement hromada, a village in Berestyn Raion of Kharkiv Oblast
- Petrivka, Zolochiv settlement hromada, a village in Bohodukhiv Raion of Kharkiv Oblast
- Petrivka, Dvorichna settlement hromada, a village in Kupiansk Raion of Kharkiv Oblast
- Petrivka, Shevchenkove rural hromada, a village in Kupiansk Raion of Kharkiv Oblast
- Petrivka, Lozova Raion, a village in Lozova Raion of Kharkiv Oblast
- Petrivka, Izium Raion, a village in Izium Raion of Kharkiv Oblast
- Petrivka, Beryslav Raion, a village in Beryslav Raion of Kherson Oblast
- Petrivka, Henichesk Raion, a village in Henichesk Raion of Kherson Oblast
- Petrivka, Kherson urban hromada, a village in Kherson raion of Kherson Oblast
- Petrivka, Lazurne settlement hromada, a village in Skadovsk Raion of Kherson Oblast
- Petrivka, Skadovsk urban hromada, a village in Skadovsk Raion of Kherson Oblast
- Petrivka, Holovanivsk Raion, a village in Holovanivsk Raion of Kirovohrad Oblast
- Petrivka, Kropyvnytskyi Raion, a village in Kropyvnytskyi Raion of Kirovohrad Oblast
- Petrivka, Novoukrainka Raion, a village in Novoukrainka Raion of Kirovohrad Oblast
- Petrivka, Oleksandriia Raion, a village in Oleksandriia Raion of Kirovohrad Oblast
- Petrivka, Khmelnytskyi, a village in Khmelnytskyi Oblast
- Petrivka, Bila Tserkva Raion, a village in Bila Tserkva Raion of Kyiv Oblast
- Petrivka, Alchevsk Raion, a village in Alchevsk Raion of Luhansk Oblast
- Petrivka, Svatove Raion, a village in Svatove Raion of Luhansk Oblast
- Petrivka, Bashtanka Raion, a village in Bashtanka Raion of Mykolaiv Oblast
- Petrivka, Mykolaiv Raion, a village in Mykolaiv Raion of Mykolaiv Oblast
- Petrivka, Pervomaisk Raion, a village in Pervomaisk Raion of Mykolaiv Oblast
- Petrivka, Prybuzhzhia rural hromada, a village in Voznesensk Raion of Mykolaiv Oblast
- Petrivka, Veselynove rural hromada, a village in Voznesensk Raion of Mykolaiv Oblast
- Petrivka, Bilhorod-Dnistrovskyi Raion, a village in Bilhorod-Dnistrovskyi Raion of Odesa Oblast
- Petrivka, Bolhrad Raion, a village in Bolhrad Raion of Odesa Oblast
- Petrivka, Novokalcheve rural hromada, a village in Berezivka Raion of Odesa Oblast
- Petrivka, Striukove rural hromada, a village in Berezivka Raion of Odesa Oblast
- Petrivka, Balta urban hromada, a village in Podilsk Raion of Odesa Oblast
- Petrivka, Kodyma urban hromada, a village in Podilsk Raion of Odesa Oblast
- Petrivka, Kuialnyk rural hromada, a village in Podilsk Raion of Odesa Oblast
- Petrivka, Liubashivka settlement hromada, a village in Podilsk Raion of Odesa Oblast
- Petrivka, Stepanivka settlement hromada, a village in Rozdilna Raion of Odesa Oblast
- Petrivka, Zakharivka settlement hromada, a village in Rozdilna Raion of Odesa Oblast
- Petrivka, Zatyshshia settlement hromada, a village in Rozdilna Raion of Odesa Oblast
- Petrivka, Kremenchuk Raion, a village in Kremenchuk Raion of Poltava Oblast
- Petrivka, Mashivka settlement hromada, a village in Poltava Raion of Poltava Oblast
- Petrivka, Myrhorod Raion, a village in Myrhorod Raion of Poltava Oblast
- Petrivka, Poltava urban hromada, a village in Poltava Raion of Poltava Oblast
- Petrivka, Skorokhodove settlement hromada, a village in Poltava Raion of Poltava Oblast
- Petrivka, Zinkiv urban hromada, a village in Poltava Raion of Poltava Oblast
- Petrivka, Mohyliv-Podilskyi Raion, a village in Mohyliv-Podilskyi Raion of Vinnytsia Oblast
- Petrivka, Vinnytsia Raion, a village in Vinnytsia Raion of Vinnytsia Oblast
- Petrivka, Zakarpattia Oblast, is a village in Chop urban hromada of Uzhhorod Raion of Zakarpattia Oblast
- Petrivka, Berdiansk Raion, is a village in Berdiansk Raion of Zaporizhzhia Oblast
- Petrivka, Pryazovske settlement hromada, is a village in Pryazovske settlement hromada of Zaporizhzhia Oblast
- Petrivka, Vasylivka Raion, is a village in Vasylivka Raion of Zaporizhzhia Oblast
- Petrivka, Yakymivka settlement hromada, is a village in Yakymivka settlement hromada of Zaporizhzhia Oblast
- Petrivka, Zhmerynka Raion, a village in Zhmerynka Raion of Vinnytsia Oblast

Former names

- Petrivka, former name of Novospaske, Bakhmut Raion, Donetsk Oblast, an urban-type settlement in Donetsk Oblast

== See also ==
- Petrovka (disambiguation)
