= Serhii Konokhov =

Ukrainian security officer

- Сергій Конохов

Personal details
- Born: Serhii Viktorovych Konokhov; 6 December 1978 (age 47) Melitopol, Melitopol Raion, Zaporizhzhia Oblast, Ukrainian SSR

Military service
- Allegiance: Ukraine
- Branch/service: Security Service of Ukraine
- Years of service: 1995–present
- Rank: Major general (2018)

Serhii Konokhov (Ukrainian: Конохов Сергій Вікторович; born 6 December 1978, Melitopol) is a Ukrainian military leader, Major General of the Security Service of Ukraine (SBU).

== Biography ==
Serhii Viktorovych Konokhov was born on December 6, 1978, in Melitopol, Zaporizhzhia region, the USSR. He studied at the National Academy of the Security Service of Ukraine since 1995. In 2000 he graduated from the National Academy of the Security Service of Ukraine with a degree in jurisprudence. In 2000-2008 Konokhov served in operational positions in the SBU. He served in senior positions in the operational units of the SBU from August 2008 to June 2016. He was a postgraduate student at the Vadim Hetman Kyiv National Economic University since 2017. On August 23, 2018, he was promoted to major general by the decree of the President of Ukraine Petro Poroshenko. In 2020 Serhii Konokhov received the Doctor of Philosophy degree. In 2021 he received the Master of Business Administration degree.
