= Myrne settlement hromada =

Myrne settlement hromada (Ukrainian: Мирненська селищна громада), an administrative division in Ukraine, may refer to:

- Myrne settlement hromada, Donetsk Oblast
- Myrne settlement hromada, Kherson Oblast
- Myrne settlement hromada, Zaporizhzhia Oblast

== See also ==
- Myrne (disambiguation)
