= Dmitry Salita =

American boxer (born 1982)

Dmitriy Salita
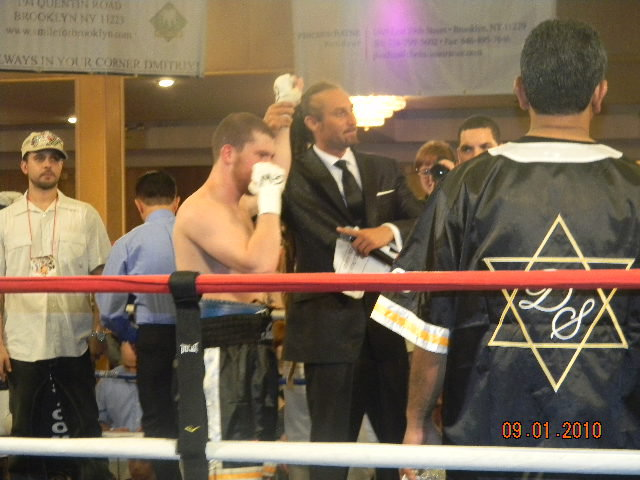
- Salita (middle, with arm raised) in 2010

Personal information
- Native name: Дмитро Саліта
- Nickname: Star of David
- Nationality: American
- Born: April 4, 1982 (age 44) Odesa, Ukrainian SSR, Soviet Union (now Ukraine)
- Height: 5 ft 9 in (175 cm)
- Weight: Light welterweight Welterweight

Boxing career
- Reach: 69 in (175 cm)
- Stance: Orthodox

Boxing record
- Total fights: 38
- Wins: 35
- Win by KO: 18
- Losses: 2
- Draws: 1

Dmitry Oleksandrovych Salita (Note: Ukrainian: Дмитро Олександрович Саліта, romanized: Dmytro Oleksandrovych Salita) (born Dmytro Oleksandrovych Lekhtman, April 4, 1982) is an American boxing promoter and former professional boxer. Born in Ukraine, he grew up in New York City from the age of nine.

Salita is a practicing Orthodox Jew. He does not fight on the Sabbath or Jewish holidays and keeps kosher.

== Biography ==
=== Early years ===
Salita was born in Odesa, and grew up in Petrivka in the Odessa Oblast in what was then the Ukrainian SSR of the Soviet Union (today Ukraine). He was five years old when he saw his first boxing match. "It was Mike Tyson, and I remember dancing around my room that night imitating the moves", he recalled. Salita's family moved to the United States when he was nine years old, citing antisemitism in Ukraine, and settled in Flatbush, Brooklyn. His father, Aleksandr Lekhtman, was an engineer; his mother, Lyudmila Salita, was an accountant. He has one brother, Mikhail.

His mother originally opposed her son's boxing, but eventually became an enthusiastic supporter. She died in January 1999, after a two-year battle with breast cancer. As a tribute to his mother, he uses her maiden name, Salita, as his professional name.

Salita graduated with a Bachelor's degree in Business and Jewish Studies from Touro College.

Salita has said that his return to Jewish observance began through a local Chabad rabbi and included putting on tefillin daily and learning the Shema.

== Marriage ==
In September 2009, Salita married Alona Aharonov, Alona is from the Lubavitch community.

In August 2013 as part of fundraising activities for the network of Chabad-Lubavitch Jewish schools Oholey Jinuj, during a gala dinner in Buenos Aires speaking with the Jewish Telegraphic Agency, Salita affirmed that at the end of his boxing career, he would like to migrate to Israel with his family.

== Boxing career ==
"My gym's like a league of nations. I seen every kind of kid come through the doors, but I ain't never seen one like this Dmitriy. Kid looks Russian, prays Jewish, and fights Black.

— Jimmy O'Pharrow

Salita started boxing at the age of 13 at the Starrett City Boxing Club. Among others, he trained with Zab Judah.

=== Amateur career ===
Salita had an amateur record of 59–5. When he was 16, he represented New York in the Junior Olympics and won a bronze medal. "I thought, 'I'm ranked in America as a boxer.' That's when I really felt like an American", he said. His last loss came when he was 17 in a split decision in the finals of the Golden Gloves tournament in 2000.

He followed that up by becoming U.S. national under 19 champion at the U.S. Amateur under 19 Championships in Gulfport, Mississippi. At the 2001 New York Golden Gloves, he won the championship at 139 pounds. Salita won the finals on April 5, 2001, at Madison Square Garden in New York City.

=== Pro career ===
He turned pro at the age of 19, in the summer of 2001. He signed a contract with Las Vegas-based promoter Bob Arum, whose Top Rank stable of fighters has included George Foreman, Larry Holmes, and Manny Pacquiao.

On August 25, 2005, Salita captured the North American Boxing Association light welterweight championship by stopping Shawn Gallegos via ninth round TKO.

Salita remained in contention for a junior welterweight title bout, extending his unbeaten streak to 28, with a unanimous 10-round decision over Grover Wiley at the Hammerstein Ballroom in New York in March 2007. Salita staggered Wiley (30–9–1) with a series of body punches in the 7th round.

On November 8, 2008, Salita won the International Boxing Federation International, the World Boxing Association international and WBF Junior Welterweight world title. A card held on the undercard of HBO PPV card featuring Roy Jones versus Joe Calzaghe.

In May 2009, he scored a dominant 10-round shutout victory over Raul "El Toro" Munoz (20–12–1, 15 KOs) in Las Vegas for his 30th win.

Salita lost to WBA light welterweight champion Amir Khan on December 5, 2009. Khan knocked out Salita in 76 seconds, knocking him down three times in the first round to defend his world title, shattering Salita's dreams of a world title. He credited Khan's superior hand speed as the reason for being knocked down.

Salita made a comeback on September 1, 2010, fighting as a junior middleweight, winning an eight-round unanimous decision over Franklin Gonzalez at the Oceana Hall in Brighton Beach, Brooklyn. After the Gonzalez bout, former world champion Paul Malignaggi entered the ring to congratulate Salita and propose a bout between the two of them in the very near future. On April 13, 2011, Salita (33–1–1, 17 KOs) scored an eight-round unanimous decision victory over Ronnie Warrior Jr. (13–5–1, 4 KOs) at the Oceana Hall.

In the final fight of his career on November 9, 2013, Salita lost to fellow Brooklyn fighter Gabriel Bracero by unanimous decision. Salita's slower reflexes and frequent drop of his guard right hand made him vulnerable to Bracero's left hooks, one which knocked Salita down in the 8th round.

== Jewish heritage ==
"I enjoy being different. People are surprised at how good the White, Jewish kid is, surprised that I can fight. I take that as a compliment."

— Salita

In 2009 Salita visited Israel. During his tour he visited the Western Wall in Jerusalem, planted trees in Aminadav Forest and toured Hebron in the West Bank, where he visited the Cave of Machpela and other holy sites. He also gave boxing tips and sparred with local Jewish residents.

== Endorsement deal ==
In 2009, Salita signed a deal to represent ARTHUR, a French-based Homewear company.

== Promoter ==
In April 2011, Salita became a boxing promoter. He is the President of Brooklyn, New York-based Salita Promotions. Among the boxers Salita promotes are Claressa Shields, Christina Hammer, Jarrell Miller, Otto Wallin, and Nikolai Potapov.

== See also ==
- List of select Jewish boxers
