= Novobohdanivka rural hromada =

Hromada in Zaporizhzhia Oblast, Ukraine

Novobohdanivka rural hromada Новобогданівська селищна громада
- Hromada
- Interactive map of Novobohdanivka rural hromada
- Country: Ukraine
- Oblast: Zaporizhzhia Oblast
- Raion: Melitopol Raion

Area
  - Total: 198.4 km^{2} (76.6 sq mi)

Population (2020)
  - Total: 4,987
  - Density: 25.14/km^{2} (65.10/sq mi)
- Settlements: 6
- Rural settlements: 1
- Villages: 5

Novobohdanivka rural hromada (Ukrainian: Новобогданівська селищна громада) is a hromada of Ukraine, located in Melitopol Raion, Zaporizhzhia Oblast. Its administrative center is the village of Novobohdanivka.

It has an area of 198.4 square kilometres (76.6 mi^{2}) and a population of 4987, as of 2020.

The hromada contains six settlements:

Five villages:

- Novobohdanivka
- Pershostepanivka
- Pryvilne
- Starobohdanivka
- Troitske

One rural-type settlement: Vidrodzhennia.

== See also ==
- List of hromadas of Ukraine
