= Solodke =

Solodke (Ukrainian: Солодке) may refer to the following places in Ukraine:

- Solodke, Donetsk Oblast, village in Donetsk Oblast
- Solodke, Melitopol Raion, Zaporizhzhia Oblast, village in Melitopol Raion
- Solodke, Polohy Raion, Zaporizhzhia Oblast, village in Polohy Raion
