= Kushchove =

Kushchove Кущове
- Location of Kushchove in Zaporizhia Oblast Location of Kushchove in Ukraine
- Coordinates: 47°46′15″N 35°35′39″E
- Country: Ukraine
- Oblast: Zaporizhzhia Oblast
- Raion: Orikhiv Raion
- Founded: 1856 (as Hutterdorf)

Area
  - Total: 0.801 km^{2} (0.309 sq mi)
- Elevation: 59 m (194 ft)

Population (2021)
  - Total: 191
  - Density: 238/km^{2} (618/sq mi)
- Postal code: 70513
- Area code: +380 6141

Kushchove (Ukrainian: Кущове Kushchove) is a small village in Orikhiv Raion, Zaporizhia Oblast, Ukraine, some 35 km east of Zaporizhia. It has population of 191 people.

Originally it was founded as Hutterdorf also known as Kucheva (German: Kutschewa) as a Hutterite village in 1856.

Some 35 Hutterite families under the leadership of Georg Waldner (1794–1857) left Johannesruh and moved to Hutterdorf, where they had purchased 1,500 desiatinas of land to reestablish communal living. In 1874 all inhabitants, except two families who joined the Mennonites, moved to the United States, where they resettled in Bon Homme Hutterite Colony in South Dakota.
