= Bon Homme Hutterite Colony =

Bon Homme
- Hutterite Colony
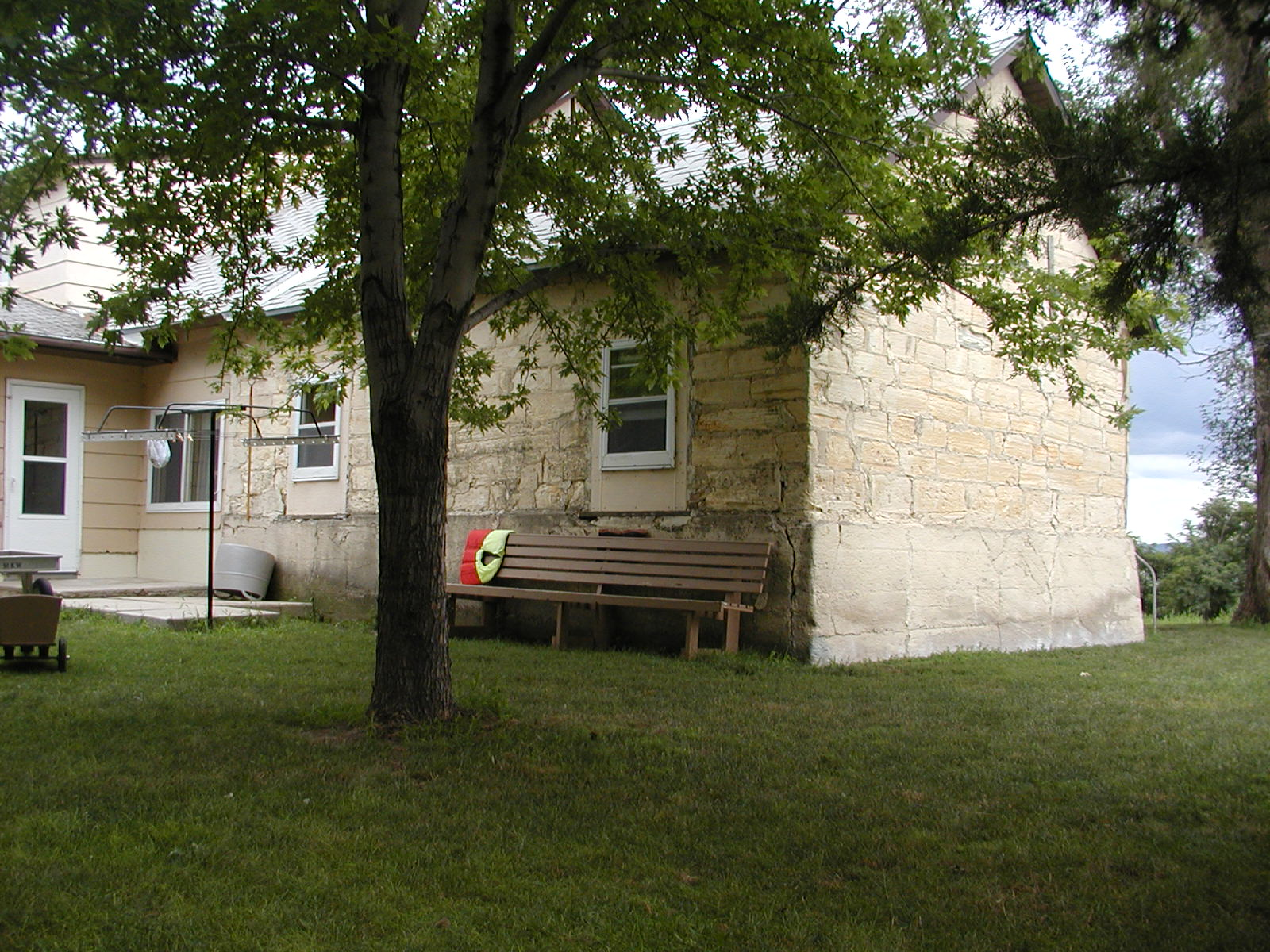
- Limestone House at Bon Homme Colony

- Location within South Dakota Bon Homme (the United States)
- Coordinates: 42.863889°N 97.706667°W
- Country: USA
- State: South Dakota
- Branch: Schmiedeleut II
- Status: Active
- Founded: 1874
- Mother colony: Hutterdorf, Ukraine
- Daughter colonies: List: Maxwell Colony, SD; Bon Homme Colony, MB; Cedar Grove Colony, SD; Platte Colony, SD; Rockport Colony, SD; Spink Colony, SD
- Bon Homme Hutterite Colony
- U.S. National Register of Historic Places
- U.S. Historic district
- Area: 25 acres (10 ha)
- MPS: Historic Hutterite Colonies TR
- NRHP reference No.: 82003913
- Added to NRHP: June 30, 1982

Bon Homme Hutterite Colony, located in Bon Homme County, South Dakota, is the mother colony of all Schmiedeleut Hutterite Colonies in North America and also the oldest Hutterite Colony in the world still in existence.

It was founded in 1874 by Hutterite immigrants from what is today Ukraine under the leadership of Michael Waldner (1834–1889), who reestablished communal living among the Hutterites in Hutterdorf, Ukraine, in 1859. It was the only Hutterite Colony that did not relocate to Canada after World War I.

25 acres (10 ha) of the site were listed on the National Register of Historic Places in 1982.

Bon Homme Hutterite Colony in 2012 belonged to the more conservative Committee Hutterites, also called Schmiedeleut 2.

== See also ==
- National Register of Historic Places listings in Bon Homme County, South Dakota
- Bon Homme Colony, South Dakota, census-designated place covering the colony
