= Oleksandrivka rural hromada =

Oleksandrivka rural hromada Олександрівська селищна громада
- Hromada
- Interactive map of Oleksandrivka rural hromada
- Country: Ukraine
- Oblast: Zaporizhzhia Oblast
- Raion: Melitopol Raion

Area
  - Total: 639.5 km^{2} (246.9 sq mi)

Population (2020)
  - Total: 6,125
  - Density: 9.578/km^{2} (24.81/sq mi)
- Settlements: 14
- Villages: 14

Oleksandrivka rural hromada (Ukrainian: Олександрівська селищна громада) is a hromada of Ukraine, located in Melitopol Raion, Zaporizhzhia Oblast. Its administrative center is the village of Oleksandrivka.

It has an area of 639.5 square kilometres (246.9 mi^{2}) and a population of 6,125, as of 2020.

The hromada contains 14 settlements, which are all villages:

- Viktorivka
- Volna
- Heorhiivka
- Hirsivka
- Divnynske
- Dunaivka
- Ihorivka
- Myronivka
- Nadezhdyne
- Nechkyne
- Novokostiantynivka
- Oleksandrivka
- Stepanivka Persha
- Chkalove

== See also ==
- List of hromadas of Ukraine
