= Novovasylivka settlement hromada =

Novovasylivka settlement hromada Нововасилівська селищна громада
- Hromada
- Interactive map of Novovasylivka settlement hromada
- Country: Ukraine
- Oblast: Zaporizhzhia Oblast
- Raion: Melitopol Raion
- Admin. center: Novovasylivka

Area
  - Total: 723.1 km^{2} (279.2 sq mi)

Population (2020)
  - Total: 7,596
  - Density: 10.50/km^{2} (27.21/sq mi)
- Settlements: 20
- Rural settlements: 1
- Villages: 18
- Towns: 1

Novovasylivka settlement hromada (Ukrainian: Нововасилівська селищна громада) is a hromada of Ukraine, located in Melitopol Raion, Zaporizhzhia Oblast. Its administrative center is the town of Novovasylivka.

It has an area of 723.1 square kilometres (279.2 mi^{2}) and a population of 7,596, as of 2020.

The hromada includes 20 settlements: 1 town (Novovasylivka), 18 villages:

- Besidivka
- Voskresenka
- Hannivka
- Hanno-Opanlinka
- Gromivka
- Ivanivka
- Kalynivka
- Makivka
- Maryanivka
- Mykolayivka
- Novomykolaivka
- Novooleksandrivka
- Novospaske
- Orihivka
- Pivdenne
- Prudentovo
- Rozhivka
- Fedorivka

and 1 rural-type settlement: Domuzly.

== See also ==
- List of hromadas of Ukraine
