= Havrylivka rural hromada =

Havryliv rural hromada Гаврилівська сільська громада
- Hromada
- Country: Ukraine
- Oblast: Zaporizhzhia Oblast
- Raion: Melitopol Raion
- Admin. center: Havrylivka

Area
  - Total: 265.4 km^{2} (102.5 sq mi)

Population (2020)
  - Total: 3,139
  - Density: 11.83/km^{2} (30.63/sq mi)
- Settlements: 10
- Villages: 10

Havrylivka rural hromada (Ukrainian: Гаврилівська сільська громада), until 2024 Chkalove rural hromada (Ukrainian: Чкаловська сільська громада) is a hromada of Ukraine, located in Melitopol Raion, Zaporizhzhia Oblast. Its administrative center is the village of Chkalove.

It has an area of 265.4 square kilometres (102.5 mi^{2}) and a population of 3139, as of 2020.

The hromada contains 10 settlements, which are all villages:

- Dobrovolcheske
- Havrylivka
- Hoholivka
- Kalinivka
- Korniivka
- Krasavych
- Musiivka
- Novoukrainka
- Zelenyi Hai
- Zelenyi Luh

== See also ==
- List of hromadas of Ukraine
