= Semenivka rural hromada =

Semenivka rural hromada Семенівська сільська громада
- Hromada
- Interactive map of Semenivka rural hromada
- Country: Ukraine
- Oblast: Zaporizhzhia Oblast
- Raion: Melitopol Raion
- Admin. center: Semenivka

Area
  - Total: 591.9 km^{2} (228.5 sq mi)

Population (2020)
  - Total: 9,355
  - Density: 15.81/km^{2} (40.93/sq mi)
- Settlements: 21
- Rural settlements: 3
- Villages: 18

Semenivka rural hromada (Ukrainian: Семенівська сільська громада) is a hromada of Ukraine, located in Melitopol Raion, Zaporizhzhia Oblast. Its administrative center is the village of Semenivka.

It has an area of 591.9 square kilometres (228.5 mi^{2}) and a population of 9355, as of 2020.

The hromada contains 21 settlements, including 18 villages:

- Verkhovyna
- Vysoke
- Zelenchuk
- Zolota Dolyna
- Lazurne
- Marivka
- Maiak
- Chekhohrad
- Novomykolaivka
- Novoiakymivka
- Obilne
- Pershotravneve
- Pivdenne
- Polianivka
- Rivne
- Semenivka
- Skhidne
- Tambovka

And 3 rural-type settlements: Malyi Utliuh, Stepne, and Trudove.

== See also ==
- List of hromadas of Ukraine
