= Terpinnia rural hromada =

Terpinnia rural hromada Терпіннівська селищна громада
- Hromada
- Interactive map of Terpinnia rural hromada
- Country: Ukraine
- Oblast: Zaporizhzhia Oblast
- Raion: Melitopol Raion

Area
  - Total: 367.5 km^{2} (141.9 sq mi)

Population (2020)
  - Total: 9,150
  - Density: 24.9/km^{2} (64.5/sq mi)
- Settlements: 19
- Rural settlements: 1
- Villages: 18

Terpinnia rural hromada (Ukrainian: Терпіннівська селищна громада) is a hromada of Ukraine, located in Melitopol Raion, Zaporizhzhia Oblast. Its administrative center is the village of Terpinnia.

It has an area of 367.5 square kilometres (141.9 mi^{2}) and a population of 9150, as of 2020.

The hromada contains 19 settlements, including 18 villages:

- Berehove
- Vidradne
- Voloshkove
- Kamianske
- Luhove
- Orlove
- Pivniche
- Pryvilne
- Prylukivka
- Promin
- Svitlodolynske
- Spaske
- Terpinnia
- Travneve
- Ukrainske
- Fedorivka
- Shyrokyi Lan
- Yasne

And 1 rural-type settlement: Zarichne.

== See also ==
- List of hromadas of Ukraine
