= Vesele settlement hromada =

Vesele settlement hromada Веселівська селищна громада
- Hromada
- Interactive map of Vesele settlement hromada
- Country: Ukraine
- Oblast: Zaporizhzhia
- Raion: Melitopol

Area
  - Total: 567.4 km^{2} (219.1 sq mi)

Population (2020)
  - Total: 13,739
  - Density: 24.21/km^{2} (62.71/sq mi)
- Settlements: 11
- Villages: 10
- Towns: 1

Vesele settlement hromada (Ukrainian: Веселівська селищна громада) is a hromada of Ukraine, located in Melitopol Raion, Zaporizhzhia Oblast. Its administrative center is the settlement of Vesele.

It has an area of 567.4 square kilometres (219.1 mi^{2}) and a population of 13,739, as of 2020.

The hromada includes 11 settlements: 1 town (Vesele) and 10 villages:

- Avangard
- Daleke
- Elizavetivka
- Mala Mykhailivka
- Menchikuri
- Novooleksandrivka
- Ozerne
- Piskoshyne
- Shiroke
- Yasna Polyana

== See also ==
- List of hromadas of Ukraine
