= Kostiantynivka rural hromada, Zaporizhzhia Oblast =

Kostiantynivka rural hromada Костянтинівська селищна громада
- Hromada
- Interactive map of Kostiantynivka rural hromada
- Country: Ukraine
- Oblast: Zaporizhzhia Oblast
- Raion: Melitopol Raion

Area
  - Total: 230.3 km^{2} (88.9 sq mi)

Population (2020)
  - Total: 14,431
  - Density: 62.66/km^{2} (162.3/sq mi)
- Settlements: 2
- Villages: 2

Kostiantynivka rural hromada (Ukrainian: Костянтинівська селищна громада) is a hromada of Ukraine, located in Melitopol Raion, Zaporizhzhia Oblast. Its administrative center is the village of Kostiantynivka.

It has an area of 230.3 square kilometres (88.9 mi^{2}) and a population of 14431, as of 2020.

The hromada contains 2 villages: Kostiantynivka and Voznesenka.

== See also ==
- List of hromadas of Ukraine
