= Bon Homme Colony, South Dakota =

- Census-designated place
- Location within South Dakota Location within the United States
- Coordinates: 42°51′54″N 97°42′20″W
- Country: United States
- State: South Dakota
- County: Bon Homme

Area
  - Total: 0.58 sq mi (1.51 km^{2})
  - Land: 0.48 sq mi (1.25 km^{2})
  - Water: 0.10 sq mi (0.26 km^{2})
- Elevation: 1,273 ft (388 m)

Population (2020)
  - Total: 97
  - Density: 200.9/sq mi (77.56/km^{2})
- Time zone: UTC-6 (Central (CST))
  - Summer (DST): UTC-5 (CDT)
- ZIP Code: 57063 (Tabor)
- Area code: 605
- FIPS code: 46-06300
- GNIS feature ID: 2812997

Bon Homme Colony is a census-designated place (CDP) in Bon Homme County, South Dakota, United States, comprising the Bon Homme Hutterite Colony. The population was 97 at the 2020 census. It was first listed as a CDP prior to the 2020 census.

It is in the southeast corner of the county, on the north shore of Lewis and Clark Lake, a reservoir on the Missouri River. It is 9 miles (14 km) south of Tabor.

== Demographics ==
Historical population
Census	Pop.	Note	%±
2020	97		—
U.S. Decennial Census
