= Novovasylivka, Melitopol Raion, Zaporizhzhia Oblast =

Rural locality in Zaporizhzhia Oblast, Ukraine

Novovasylivka Нововасилівка
- Rural settlement
- Location in Zaporizhzhia Oblast Location in Ukraine
- Country: Ukraine
- Oblast: Zaporizhzhia Oblast
- Raion: Melitopol Raion

Population (2022)
  - Total: 2,183
- Time zone: UTC+2 (EET)
  - Summer (DST): UTC+3 (EEST)

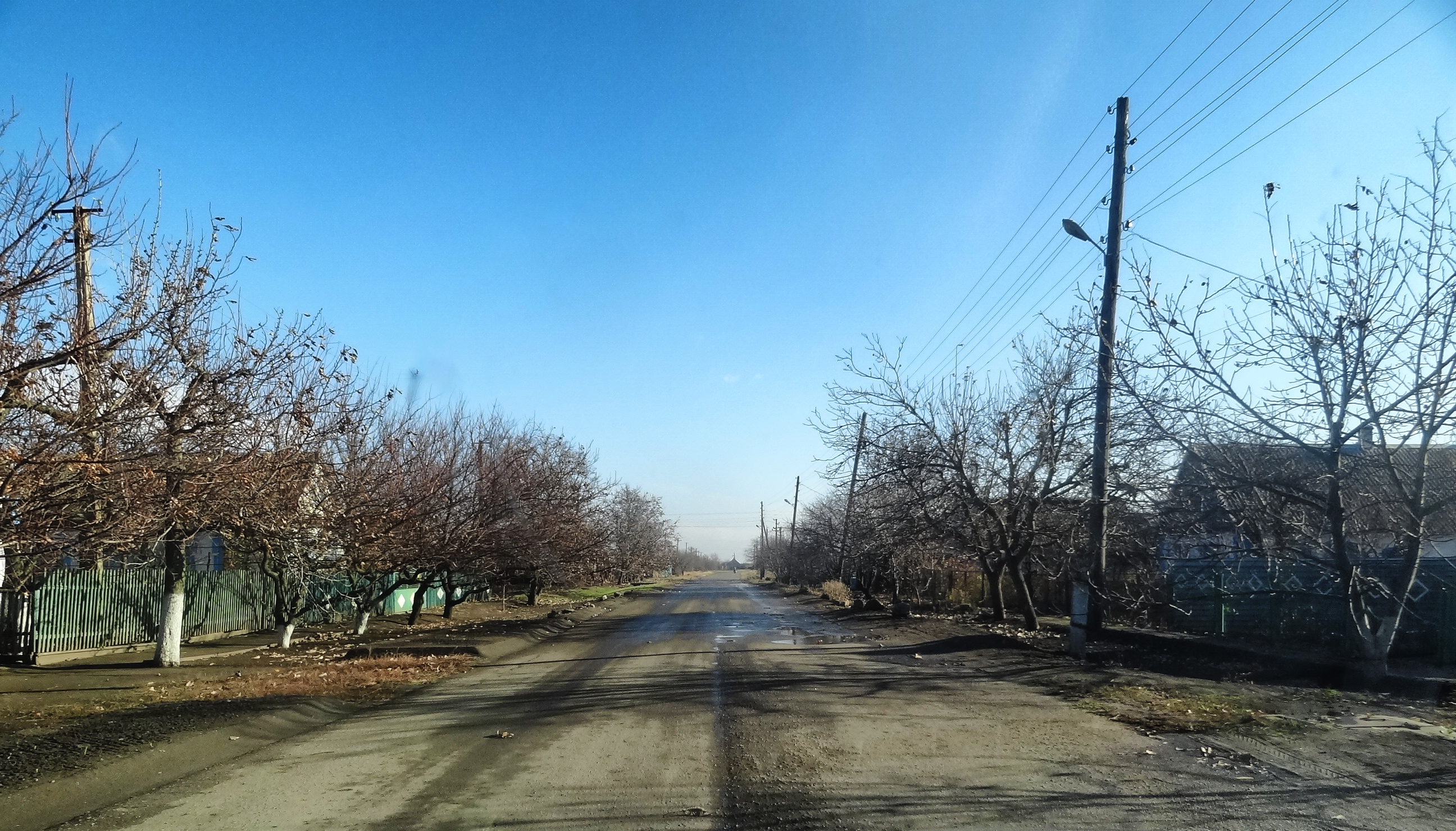
Street in Novovasilivka

Novovasylivka (Ukrainian: Нововасилівка; Russian: Нововасильевка) is a rural settlement in Melitopol Raion, Zaporizhzhia Oblast, southern Ukraine. It is located in the steppe some 20 kilometres (12 mi) north of the coast of the Sea of Azov. Novovasylivka hosts the administration of Novovasylivka settlement hromada, one of the hromadas of Ukraine. Population: 2,183 (2022 estimate).

== History ==
Until 18 July 2020, Novovasylivka belonged to Pryazovske Raion. The raion was abolished in July 2020 as part of the administrative reform of Ukraine, which reduced the number of raions of Zaporizhzhia Oblast to five. The area of Pryazovske Raion was merged into Melitopol Raion.

Until 26 January 2024, Novovasylivka was designated urban-type settlement. On this day, a new law entered into force which abolished this status, and Novovasylivka became a rural settlement.

== Economy ==
=== Transportation ===
The settlement has access to highway M14 which runs parallel to the sea coast, connecting Melitopol and Mariupol.
