= Petrovka =

Petrovka may refer to:

- Petrovka, Armenia, a town in Armenia
- Petrovka, Kyrgyzstan, a village in Chuy Region, Kyrgyzstan
- Petrovka settlement, a Bronze Age settlement in Zhambyl District, North Kazakhstan Region, Kazakhstan
  - Sintashta-Petrovka-Arkaim, a sub-culture of the Andronovo culture, related to this settlement
- Petrovka, Sakha Republic, a selo in Kharansky Rural Okrug of Megino-Kangalassky District
- Rural localities in Kursk Oblast:
  - Petrovka, Gorshechensky District, Kursk Oblast, a village
  - Petrovka, Krasnodolinsky Selsoviet, Kastorensky District, Kursk Oblast, a village
  - Petrovka, Krasnoznamensky Selsoviet, Kastorensky District, Kursk Oblast, a village
  - Petrovka, Uspensky Selsoviet, Kastorensky District, Kursk Oblast, a village
  - Petrovka, Medvensky District, Kursk Oblast, a khutor
  - Petrovka, Shchigrovsky District, Kursk Oblast, a village
- Petrovka, Klyuchevsky District, Altai Krai
- Petrovka Street, in downtown Moscow

== See also ==
- Petrivka (disambiguation)
