= Raikhenfeld rural hromada =

Raikhenfeld rural hromada Райхенфельдська сільська територіальна громада
- Hromada
- Interactive map of Raikhenfeld rural hromada
- Country: Ukraine
- Oblast: Zaporizhzhia Oblast
- Raion: Melitopol Raion

Area
  - Total: 155.8 km^{2} (60.2 sq mi)

Population (2020)
  - Total: 3,369
  - Density: 21.62/km^{2} (56.01/sq mi)
- Settlements: 12
- Villages: 12

Raikhenfeld rural hromada (Ukrainian: Райхенфельдська сільська територіальна громада) is a hromada of Ukraine, located in Melitopol Raion, Zaporizhzhia Oblast. Its administrative center is the village of Raikhenfeld.

It has an area of 155.8 square kilometres (60.2 mi^{2}) and a population of 3369, as of 2020.

On 26 November 2025, the Cabinet of Ministers of Ukraine approved the renaming of the Plodorodne rural hromada (Плодородненська сільська громада) to Raikhenfeld rural hromada due to the renaming of the administrative center earlier.

The hromada contains 12 settlements, which are all villages:

- Bratske
- Marianivka
- Mykolaivka
- Molodizhne
- Novomykolaivka
- Oleksandrivka
- Pidhirne
- Pokazne
- Radisne
- Raikhenfeld
- Solodke
- Zrazkove

== See also ==
- List of hromadas of Ukraine
