= Myrne, Myrne settlement hromada, Melitopol Raion, Zaporizhzhia Oblast =

Urban locality in Zaporizhzhia Oblast, Ukraine

Myrne Мирне
- Rural settlement
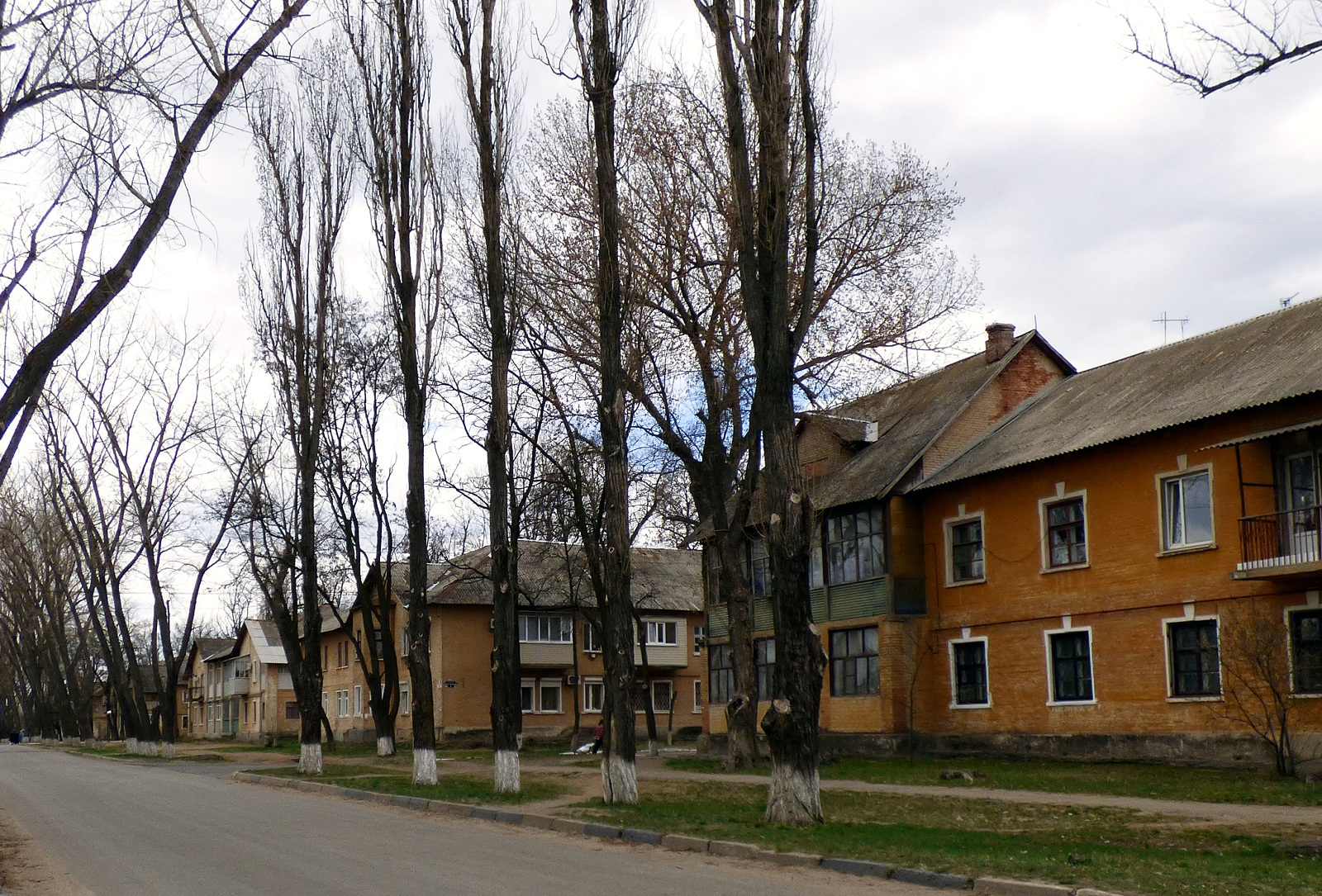
- Interactive map of Myrne
- Location in Zaporizhzhia Oblast Location in Ukraine
- Country: Ukraine
- Oblast: Zaporizhzhia Oblast
- Raion: Melitopol Raion
- Hromada: Myrne settlement hromada

Population (2022)
  - Total: 2,859
- Time zone: UTC+2 (EET)
  - Summer (DST): UTC+3 (EEST)
- Postal code: 72350
- Area code: +380 6192

Myrne (Ukrainian: Мирне; Russian: Мирное) is a rural settlement in Melitopol Raion, Zaporizhzhia Oblast, southern Ukraine. It is located on the right bank of the Molochna. Myrne hosts the administration of Myrne settlement hromada, one of the hromadas of Ukraine. Population: 2,859 (2022 estimate).

== Economy ==
=== Transportation ===
The closest railway station, Obilna railway station, about 10 kilometres (6.2 mi) west of the settlement, is on the railway connecting Zaporizhzhia and Melitopol.

The settlement has access to highway M18 which connects Zaporizhzhia and Melitopol.

== Demographics ==
=== Population ===
| 1989 | 2001 | 2016 |
|---|---|---|
| 3,421 | 3,119 | 3,066 |

=== Population distribution by native language (2001) ===
| Ukrainian | Russian | Bulgarian | Belarusian | Hebrew | Moldavian |
|---|---|---|---|---|---|
| 35.17% | 63.90% | 0.26% | 0.23% | 0.06% | 0.03% |
