= Kyrylivka settlement hromada =

Kyrylivka settlement hromada Кирилівська селищна громада
- Hromada
- Interactive map of Kyrylivka settlement hromada
- Country: Ukraine
- Oblast: Zaporizhzhia Oblast
- Raion: Melitopol Raion

Area
  - Total: 662.1 km^{2} (255.6 sq mi)

Population (2020)
  - Total: 6,569
  - Density: 9.921/km^{2} (25.70/sq mi)
- Settlements: 8
- Villages: 7
- Towns: 1

Kyrylivka settlement hromada (Ukrainian: Кирилівська селищна громада) is a hromada of Ukraine, located in Melitopol Raion, Zaporizhzhia Oblast. Its administrative center is the town of Kyrylivka.

It has an area of 662.1 square kilometres (255.6 mi^{2}) and a population of 6,569, as of 2020.

The hromada includes 8 settlements: 1 town (Kyrylivka) and 7 villages:

- Atmanai
- Vovche
- Kosykh
- Lymanske
- Nove
- Okhrimivka
- Solone

== See also ==
- List of hromadas of Ukraine
