= Limansky (rural locality) =

Name of several Russian rural localities

Limansky (Russian: Лиманский; masculine), Limanskaya (Лиманская; feminine), or Limanskoye (Лиманское; neuter) is the name of several rural localities in Russia:

- Limansky, Krasnodar Krai, a settlement in Chepiginsky Rural Okrug of Bryukhovetsky District of Krasnodar Krai
- Limansky, Rostov Oblast, a khutor in Zolotarevskoye Rural Settlement of Semikarakorsky District of Rostov Oblast
