= Myrne settlement hromada, Zaporizhzhia Oblast =

Myrne settlement hromada Мирненська селищна громада
- Hromada
- Interactive map of Myrne settlement hromada
- Country: Ukraine
- Oblast: Zaporizhzhia Oblast
- Raion: Melitopol Raion

Area
  - Total: 196.3 km^{2} (75.8 sq mi)

Population (2020)
  - Total: 5,478
  - Density: 27.91/km^{2} (72.28/sq mi)
- Settlements: 9
- Rural settlements: 1
- Villages: 7
- Towns: 1

Myrne settlement hromada (Ukrainian: Мирненська селищна громада) is a hromada of Ukraine, located in Melitopol Raion, Zaporizhzhia Oblast. Its administrative center is the town of Myrne.

It has an area of 196.3 square kilometres (75.8 mi^{2}) and a population of 5,478, as of 2020.

The hromada includes 9 settlements: 1 urban-type settlement (Myrne), 7 villages:

- Arabka
- Astrakhanka
- Borysivka
- Novopylypivka
- Olenivka
- Svobodne
- Tykhonivka

And 1 rural-type settlement: Sosnivka.

== See also ==
- List of hromadas of Ukraine
