= Vesele, Zaporizhzhia Oblast =

Rural locality in Zaporizhzhia Oblast, Ukraine

Vesele Веселе
- Rural settlement
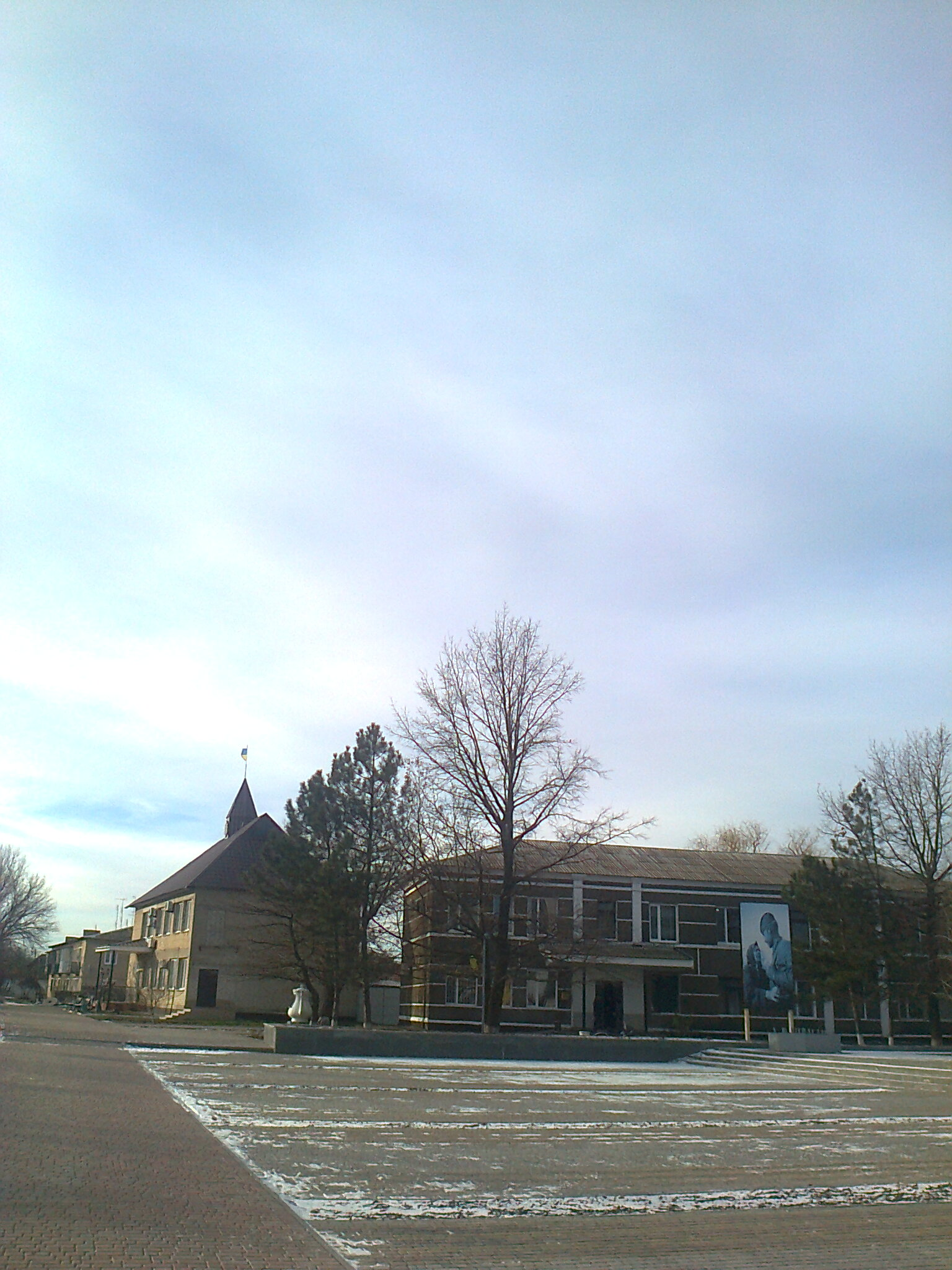
- Central street

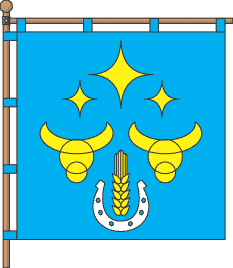
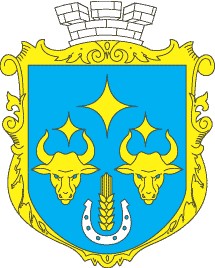
- Flag Coat of arms

- Location within Ukraine Location within Zaporizhzhia Oblast
- Coordinates: 47°00′57″N 34°54′44″E
- Country: Ukraine
- Oblast: Zaporizhzhia Oblast
- Raion: Melitopol Raion
- Hromada: Vesele settlement hromada
- First mentioned: 1815

Area
  - Total: 14 km^{2} (5.4 sq mi)
- Elevation: 77 m (253 ft)

Population (2022)
  - Total: 9,340 ▼
  - Density: 670/km^{2} (1,700/sq mi)
- Time zone: UTC+2 (EET)
  - Summer (DST): UTC+3 (EEST)
- Postal code: 72202
- Area code: +380 6136
- Website: veselivska-gromada.gov.ua

Vesele (Ukrainian: Веселе) is a rural settlement in Melitopol Raion, Zaporizhzhia Oblast, southern Ukraine. It was formerly the administrative center of Vesele Raion until the raion was abolished in 2020. It had a population of 9,340 (2022 estimate).

== History ==
Vesele was founded in 1815. The earliest settlers were mostly fugitive serfs escaping from oppression elsewhere in the Russian Empire.

In 1923, after Vesele was incorporated into the Ukrainian SSR of the Soviet Union, it was designated the administrative center of Vesele Raion.

During World War II, Vesele was occupied by the forces of Nazi Germany from 18 September 1941 to 26 October 1943. In 1957, Vesele received urban-type settlement status.

On 26 January 2024, a new law entered into force in Ukraine which abolished the status of urban-type settlement, so all urban-type settlements - including Vesele - were automatically converted to rural settlements.

== Demographics ==
As of the 2001 Ukrainian census, its population was 11,096, with a population that self-identified their ethnic backgrounds predominantly as Ukrainians and Russians.

== Gallery ==
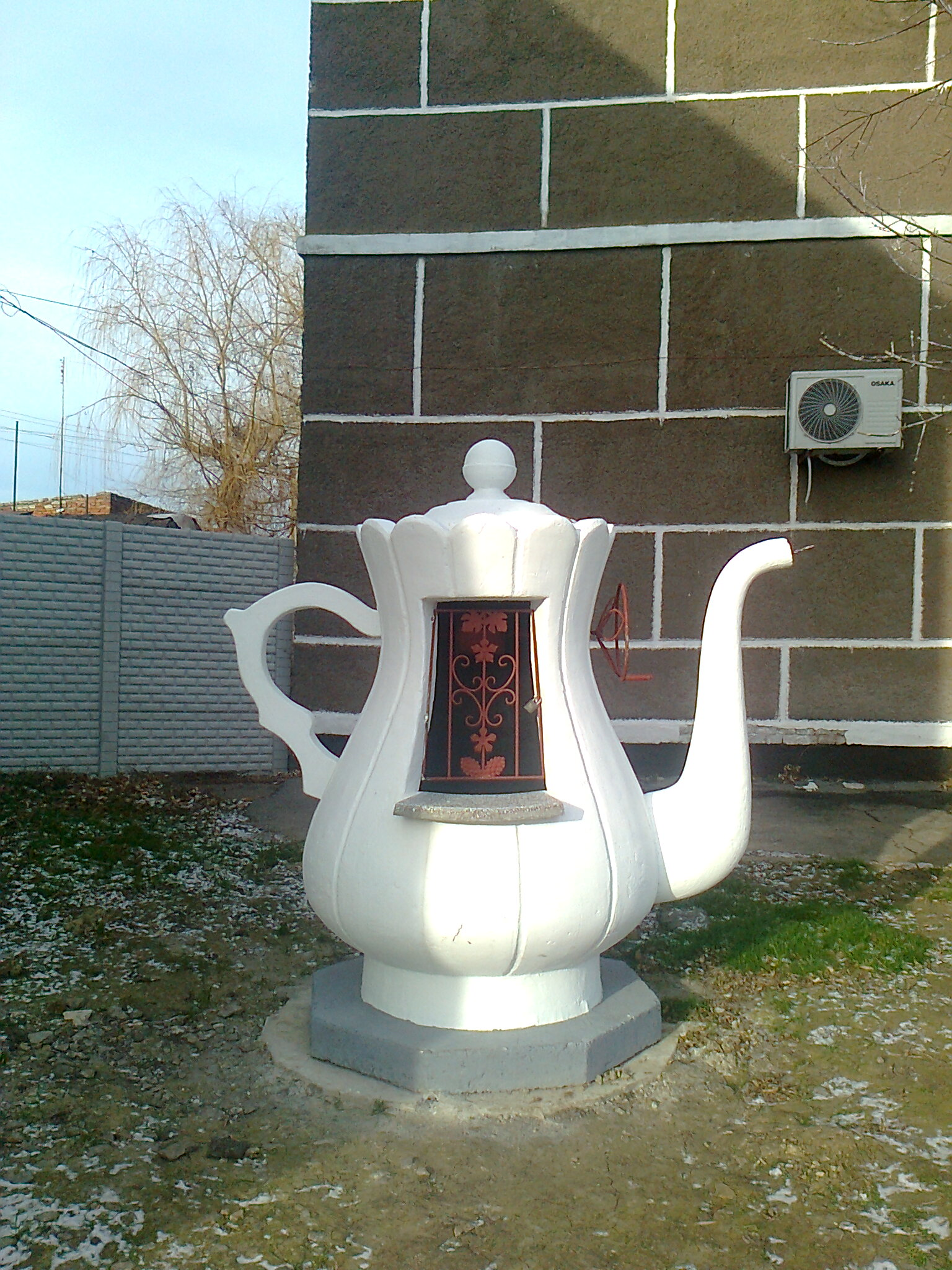

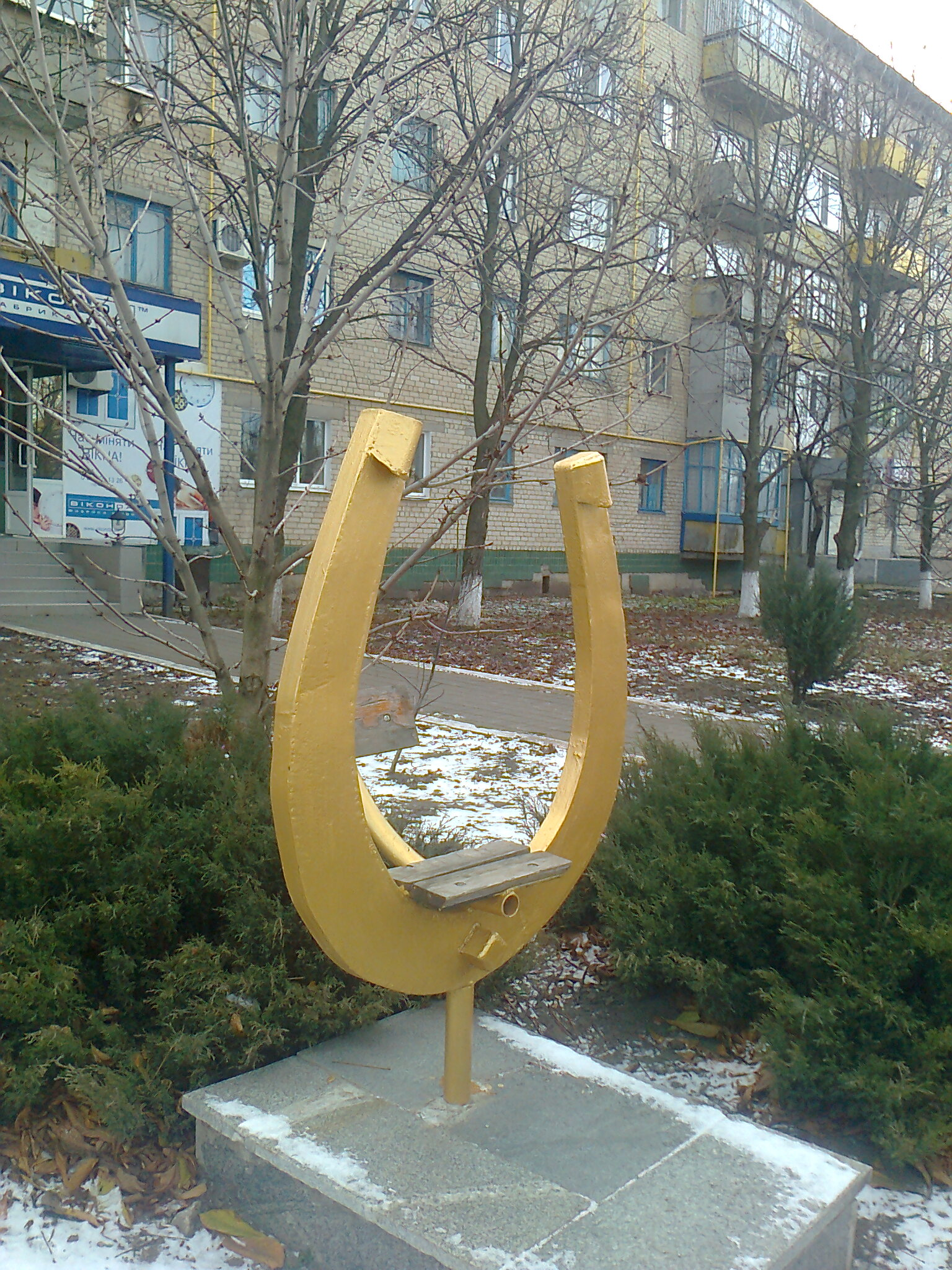
