= Nove rural hromada, Zaporizhzhia Oblast =

Nove rural hromada Новенська селищна громада
- Hromada
- Interactive map of Nove rural hromada
- Country: Ukraine
- Oblast: Zaporizhzhia Oblast
- Raion: Melitopol Raion

Area
  - Total: 252.0 km^{2} (97.3 sq mi)

Population (2020)
  - Total: 5,046
  - Density: 20.02/km^{2} (51.86/sq mi)
- Settlements: 12
- Rural settlements: 4
- Villages: 8

Nove rural hromada (Ukrainian: Новенська селищна громада) is a hromada of Ukraine, located in Melitopol Raion, Zaporizhzhia Oblast. Its administrative center is the village of Nove.

It has an area of 252.0 square kilometres (97.3 mi^{2}) and a population of 5046, as of 2020.

The hromada contains 12 settlements, including 8 villages:

- Danylo-Ivanivka
- Dolynske
- Kyrpychne
- Molochne
- Pishchanske
- Romashky
- Tashchenak
- Udachne

And 4 rural-type settlements: Zelene, Nove, Sadove, and Fruktove.

== See also ==
- List of hromadas of Ukraine
