= Yakymivka settlement hromada =

Yakymivka settlement hromada Якимівська селищна громада
- Hromada
- Interactive map of Yakymivka settlement hromada
- Country: Ukraine
- Oblast: Zaporizhzhia
- Raion: Melitopol

Area
  - Total: 1,242.2 km^{2} (479.6 sq mi)

Population (2020)
  - Total: 25,458
  - Density: 20.494/km^{2} (53.080/sq mi)
- Settlements: 36
- Rural settlements: 4
- Villages: 31
- Towns: 1

Yakymivka settlement hromada (Ukrainian: Якимівська селищна громада) is a hromada of Ukraine, located in Melitopol Raion, Zaporizhzhia Oblast. Its administrative center is the town of Yakymivka.

It has an area of 1,242.2 square kilometres (479.6 mi^{2}) and a population of 25,458, as of 2020.

The hromada includes 36 settlements: 1 town (Yakymivka), 31 villages:

- Andriivka
- Bogatyr
- Velyka Ternivka
- Vesnyane
- Vovchanske
- Volodymyrivka
- Vyazovka
- Hannivka
- Hvardiiske
- Davydivka
- Druzhba
- Elizavetivka
- Zernove
- Zirka
- Mala Ternivka
- Myrne
- Mykhailivske
- Oleksandrivka
- Novodanilivka
- Peremoha
- Petrivka
- Radivonivka
- Rozhivka
- Stepove
- Tavriyske
- Timofiivka
- Chervone
- Chornozemne
- Shevchenko
- Shelyugy
- Yuryivka

And 4 rural-type settlements: Maksym Gorky, Peremozhne, Trudove, and Yakymivske.

== See also ==
- List of hromadas of Ukraine
