= Pryazovske settlement hromada =

Pryazovske settlement hromada Приазовська селищна громада
- Hromada
- Interactive map of Pryazovske settlement hromada
- Country: Ukraine
- Oblast: Zaporizhzhia Oblast
- Raion: Melitopol Raion

Area
  - Total: 570.7 km^{2} (220.3 sq mi)

Population (2020)
  - Total: 12,134
  - Density: 21.26/km^{2} (55.07/sq mi)
- Settlements: 18
- Villages: 17
- Towns: 1

Pryazovske settlement hromada (Ukrainian: Приазовська селищна громада) is a hromada of Ukraine, located in Melitopol Raion, Zaporizhzhia Oblast. Its administrative center is the town of Pryazovske.

It has an area of 570.7 square kilometres (220.3 mi^{2}) and a population of 12,134, as of 2020.

The hromada includes 18 settlements: 1 town (Pryazovske) and 17 villages:

- Babanivka
- Bilorichanske
- Bohdanivka
- Botiieve
- Vyshneve
- Volodymyrivka
- Hamivka
- Dmytrivka
- Dobrivka
- Novoivanivka
- Novopokrovka
- Petrivka
- Prymorskyi Posad
- Stepanivka Druha
- Strohanivka
- Tavriiske
- Shevchenka

== See also ==
- List of hromadas of Ukraine
