= Lymanske =

Lymanske (Ukrainian: Лиманське) may refer to several places in Ukraine:

== Places ==
- Lymanske, Dnipropetrovsk Oblast
- Lymanske, Kherson Oblast
- Lymanske, Mykolaiv Oblast
- Lymanske, Izmail Raion, Odesa Oblast
- Lymanske, Rozdilna Raion, Odesa Oblast
- Lymanske, Zaporizhzhia Oblast

== Other ==
- Lymanske Airport
