= Vesele Raion =

Former subdivision of Zaporizhzhia Oblast, Ukraine

Vesele Raion Веселівський район
- Raion
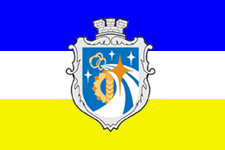
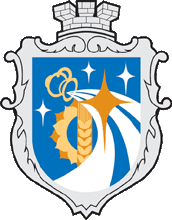
- Flag Coat of arms

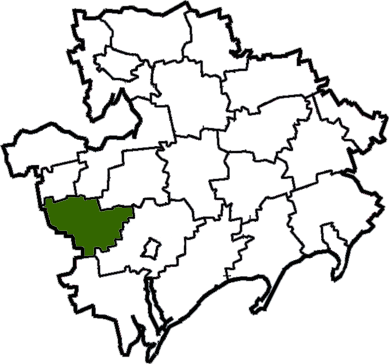
- Coordinates: 47°0′58.86″N 34°57′10.39″E
- Country: Ukraine
- Oblast: Zaporizhzhia Oblast
- Established: 1923
- Disestablished: 18 July 2020
- Admin. center: Vesele
- Subdivisions: List: 0 — city councils; 1 — settlement councils; 12 — rural councils; Number of localities: 0 — cities; 1 — urban-type settlements; 28 — villages; — rural settlements

Government
  - Governor: Iryna Kukovynets

Area
  - Total: 1,128 km^{2} (436 sq mi)

Population (2020)
  - Total: 20,672 ▼
  - Density: 18.33/km^{2} (47.46/sq mi)
- Time zone: UTC+02:00 (EET)
  - Summer (DST): UTC+03:00 (EEST)
- Postal index: 72200—72254
- Area code: +380 6136
- Website: http://veseloezp.narod.ru

Vesele Raion (Ukrainian: Веселівський район) was one of raions (districts) of Zaporizhzhia Oblast in southern Ukraine. The administrative center of the region was the urban-type settlement of Vesele. The raion was abolished on 18 July 2020 as part of the administrative reform of Ukraine, which reduced the number of raions of Zaporizhzhia Oblast to five. The area of Vesele Raion was merged into Melitopol Raion. The last estimate of the raion population was 20,672 (2020 est.).
