= Melitopol Raion =

Subdivision of Zaporizhzhia Oblast, Ukraine

Melitopol Raion Мелітопольський район
- Raion
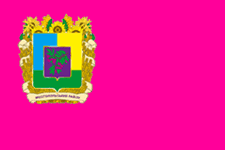
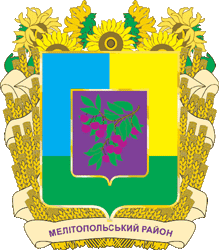
- Flag Coat of arms
- Interactive map of Melitopol Raion
- Coordinates: 46°56′35.1″N 35°16′34.96″E
- Country: Ukraine
- Oblast: Zaporizhzhia Oblast
- Established: 1930
- Admin. center: Melitopol
- Subdivisions: 16 hromadas

Government
  - Governor: Valeriy Gorban

Area
  - Total: 7,081.04 km^{2} (2,734.00 sq mi)

Population (2022)
  - Total: 276,638
  - Density: 39.0674/km^{2} (101.184/sq mi)
- Time zone: UTC+02:00 (EET)
  - Summer (DST): UTC+03:00 (EEST)
- Postal index: 72330—72384
- Area code: +380 619
- Website: http://www.mrda.gov.ua/ https://melokrug.gosuslugi.ru/ (Russian administration)

Melitopol Raion (Ukrainian: Мелітопольський район) is one of the five raions (districts) of Zaporizhzhia Oblast in southern Ukraine. The administrative center of the region is Melitopol. Population: 276,638 (2022 estimate).

On 18 July 2020, as part of the administrative reform of Ukraine, the number of raions of Zaporizhzhia Oblast was reduced to five, and the area of Melitopol Raion was significantly expanded by absorbing Pryazovske, Vesele, Yakymivka and Mykhailivka Raions, as well as the city of Melitopol, which was previously incorporated as a city of Oblast significance. The population was 48,191 (2020 est.).

During the Russian invasion of Ukraine, the raion has been occupied by Russia.

== Subdivisions ==
The raion is divided into sixteen hromadas:

- Chakove rural hromada, with its center in Chkalove
- Kostiantynivka rural hromada, with its center in Kostiantynivka
- Kyrylivka settlement hromada, with its center in Kyrylivka
- [Melitopol urban hromada], coterminous with the city Melitopol
- Myrne settlement hromada, with its center in Myrne
- Nove rural hromada, with its center in Nove
- Novobohdanivka rural hromada, with its center in Novobohdanivka
- Novouspenivka rural hromada, with its center in Novouspenivka
- Novovasylivka settlement hromada, with its center in Novovasylivka, Melitopol Raion, Zaporizhzhia Oblast
- Oleksandrivka rural hromada, with its center in Oleksandrivka
- Plodorodne rural hromada, with its center in Plodorodne
- Pryazovske settlement hromada, with its center in Pryazovske
- Semenivka rural hromada, with its center in Semenivka
- Terpinnia rural hromada, with its center in Terpinnia
- Vesele settlement hromada, with its center in Vesele
- Yakymivka settlement hromada, with its center in Yakymivka

== Geography ==
Melitopol Raion is located on the Black Sea coast, on the Black Sea Lowland. The area of the district is 7 081.0 km^{2}.

Typical landscapes for Melitopol Raion are steppes on chernozems. There are salt marshes. Steppe vegetation, due to plowing, has been preserved mainly on the slopes of river valleys and gullies.

Molochna river flow through Melitopol Raion.

The climate of the district is temperate continental with dry periods, but there is a softening of the climate due to the proximity to the Sea of Azov. According to the Köppen-Geiger climate classification, the climate of the Melitopol Raion is humid continental with hot summers (Dfa).

== Transport ==
Melitopol is the main transport hub of the district. The M14 Odesa-Novoazovsk highway and the M18 Kharkiv-Simferopol national highway pass through it. The Melitopol railway station is a transit point for travel in the direction of Kharkiv - Crimea.

== Bibliography ==
- Національний атлас України/НАН України, Інститут географії, Державна служба геодезії, картографії та кадастру; голов. ред. Л. Г. Руденко; голова ред. кол.Б.Є. Патон. — К.: ДНВП «Картографія», 2007. — 435 с. — 5 тис.прим. — ISBN 978-966-475-067-4.
- Географічна енциклопедія України : [у 3 т.] / редкол.: О. М. Маринич (відповід. ред.) та ін. — К., 1989—1993. — 33 000 екз. — ISBN 5-88500-015-8.
