= Monuments of national significance in Zaporizhzhia Oblast =

Soviet-era cultural heritage plaque on the Baida Island

The State Register of Immovable Monuments of Ukraine classifies cultural heritage monuments as either of local or national significance. (Note: 'Monuments of national significance' may also be translated as 'monuments of national importance'; Ukrainian: пам'ятки національного значення) To be classified as nationally significant, a monument must have had a substantial impact on Ukraine's culture, been associated with major historical events or individuals who shaped national culture, represented a masterpiece of creative genius, or embodied a disappeared civilisation or disappeared artistic style. Monuments of national significance are inscribed on the register by the Cabinet of Ministers, and are protected and maintained by the Ministry of Culture. All listed monuments belong to at least one of the following categories: archaeology, history, monumental art, architecture, urban planning, garden and park art, landscape, or science and technology. (Note: The categories are defined as such: Archaeological monuments are underground or underwater remains of human activity that bear testimony to the origin or development of civilisation.; Historic monuments are buildings, structures, burials, and other sites associated with important historical events or the lives and activities of prominent individuals.; Monuments of monumental art are works of fine art.; Architectural monuments are buildings and structures that retain full or partial authenticity and express characteristics of a particular culture, era, style, construction technique, or represent works of renowned architects.; Urban planning monuments are historic neighbourhoods, streets, squares, or ensembles with preserved spatial layouts and architectural integrity.; Monuments of garden and park art combine park construction with natural or anthropogenic landscapes.; Landscape monuments are natural areas possessing historical value.; Monuments of science and technology are industrial, engineering, or scientific sites that reflect the scientific and technological development of an era or discipline.)

The first attempts to establish registers of protected buildings were undertaken in 1917 and 1918 by the Ukrainian People's Republic. These efforts continued in the 1920s in Soviet Ukraine, culminating in the listing of thousands of monuments, but were halted in the 1930s with the dissolution of relevant institutions and the active destruction of cultural—particularly religious—heritage. The listing of cultural heritage monuments in the region was renewed in 1956. A list of architectural monuments was approved in 1963, followed by a separate list of artistic, historic, and archaeological monuments in 1965. Both lists remained in use after Ukraine declared independence in 1991. On 8 June 2000, the State Register of Immovable Monuments was established with the adoption of the law On the Protection of Cultural Heritage. All entries from the Soviet-era list of artistic, historic, and archaeological monuments were transferred to the new register on 14 September 2009. The transfer of monuments from the Soviet architectural register, however, has proceeded more slowly and remains incomplete as of 2026, although the process has accelerated in recent years. At the same time, a number of sites have been deprived of their protected status to comply with decommunisation and derussification laws in effect since 2015 and 2023, respectively.

Zaporizhzhia Oblast is located in southeastern Ukraine by the Sea of Azov and contains 16 monuments of national significance. (Note: No monuments of national significance in the oblast remain on the Soviet-era register.) It is divided into five raions (districts), four of which – Berdiansk, Melitopol, Vasylivka, and Zaporizhzhia – include five, two, four, and five monuments of national significance, respectively. Polohy Raion contains no listed national monuments. Of the total, nine are classified as archaeological monuments, four as architectural, and three as historic. The archaeological monuments cover time periods from the Paleolithic (c. 2.6 million – c. 12,000 years ago) to the Zaporozhian Cossack era (16th–18th centuries). The latest inscriptions date to February 2025.

== Berdiansk Raion ==
Monuments of national significance in Berdiansk Raion
Name (Note: The names listed are unofficial translations as the register is only available in Ukrainian. The official Ukrainian names are shown below each translation, with links to the corresponding Ukrainian Wikipedia articles if applicable.)	Location	Date constructed (Note: As indicated on the register)	Date designated (Note: For monuments previously listed on a Soviet-era register, the date of transfer to the modern register is indicated.)	Coordinates	Type	Protection number (Note: Each monument is assigned a unique protection number and those of national significance in Zaporizhzhia Oblast start with the digits 08.)	Photo	Ref.
Men's gymnasium building where P. P. Shmidt, one of the leaders of the 1905 Sevastopol armed uprising, studied Будинок чоловічої гімназії, в якій навчався один з керівників Севастопольського збройного повстання 1905 року П. П. Шмідт	Berdiansk	1876–1880	14 September 2009	46.75435°N 36.78421°E	Historic	080004-Н	More images	
Kurgan cemetery "Popivski Mohyly" Курганний могильник "Попівські Могили"	Berestove	4th–3rd millennia BCE, 2nd millennium – 10th century BCE, 4th millennium BCE – first half of the 2nd millennum CE	14 September 2009	47.17396°N 36.70143°E	Archaeological	080005-Н	More images	
Kurgan cemetery "Kanat-mohyla" Курганний могильник "Канат-могила"	Krymka	4th–3rd millennia BCE, 2nd millennium – 10th century BCE, 4th millennium BCE – first half of the 2nd millennum CE	14 September 2009	46.91396°N 36.44741°E	Archaeological	080006-Н	More images	
Trinity Church in Obitochne Троїцька церква в Обіточному	Prymorsk	1814	13 February 2025	46.73727°N 36.39176°E	Architectural	080017	More images	
Earthen fortifications of the Zakharivska Fortress Земляні укріплення Захар'ївської фортеці	Troitske	18th century	13 February 2025	47.05924°N 36.97839°E	Architectural	140016	More images	

== Melitopol Raion ==
Monuments of national significance in Melitopol Raion
Name	Location	Date constructed	Date designated	Coordinates	Type	Protection number	Photo	Ref.
Cult complex "Kamyana Mohyla" Культовий комплекс "Кам'яна Могила"	Myrne	22nd millennium BC – 11th century	14 September 2009	46.95035°N 35.46998°E	Archaeological	080011-Н	More images	
Kurgan cemetery "Kuliab-mohyla" Курганний могильник "Куляб-могила"	Starobohdanivka	2nd millennium – 10th century BCE, 4th millennium BCE – first half of the 2nd millennum CE	14 September 2009	47.09983°N 35.47628°E	Archaeological	080012-Н		

== Vasylivka Raion ==
Monuments of national significance in Vasylivka Raion
Name	Location	Date constructed	Date designated	Coordinates	Type	Protection number	Photo	Ref.
Kamianka hillfort Кам'янське городище	Kamianka-Dniprovska	9th century BCE – 4th century CE	14 September 2009	47.49060°N 34.38128°E	Archaeological	080008-Н	More images	
Kurgan cemetery "Tsymbalova Mohyla" Курганний могильник "Цимбалова Могила"	Velyka Bilozerka	4th millennium BCE – first half of the 2nd millennum CE	14 September 2009	47.27770°N 34.62725°E	Archaeological	080007-Н	More images	
Kurgan cemetery "Mamai-mohyla" Курганний могильник "Мамай-могила"	Velyka Znamianka	4th millennium BCE – first half of the 2nd millennum CE	14 September 2009	47.43320°N 34.27216°E	Archaeological	080009-Н	More images	
Kurgan cemetery "Solokha" Курганний могильник "Солоха"	Velyka Znamianka	4th millennium BCE – first half of the 2nd millennum CE	14 September 2009	47.32650°N 34.33915°E	Archaeological	080009-Н	More images	

== Zaporizhzhia Raion ==
Monuments of national significance in Zaporizhzhia Raion
Name	Location	Date constructed	Date designated	Coordinates	Type	Protection number	Photo	Ref.
Archaeological complex "Baida Island" Археологічний комплекс "Острів Байда"	Zaporizhzhia	2nd millennium – 10th century BCE, 5th–17th centuries, 1736–1739	14 September 2009	47.83685°N 35.05110°E	Archaeological	080001-Н	More images	
Grave of Kish otaman Osyp Hladkyi Могила Осипа Гладкого - кошового отамана	Zaporizhzhia	1866	14 September 2009	47.81931°N 35.18137°E	Historic	080002-Н	More images	
Memorial complex dedicated to Soviet soldiers who died during the Battle of the Dnieper Меморіальний комплекс на честь радянських воїнів, загиблих під час форсування Дніпра	Zaporizhzhia	1943	14 September 2009	47.87530°N 35.07762°E	Historic	080003-Н	More images	
Residential building Жилий будинок	Zaporizhzhia	19th–20th centuries	13 February 2025	47.81877°N 35.17361°E	Architectural	080014	More images	
Nobility Assembly Дворянське зібрання	Zaporizhzhia	1912	13 February 2025	47.81342°N 35.18328°E	Architectural	080015	More images	

== See also ==
- List of historic reserves in Ukraine
- Ukrainian architecture
