= Prymorske, Zaporizhzhia Oblast =

Prymorske Приморське
- Location in Ukraine Prymorske (Ukraine)
- Country: Ukraine
- Oblast: Zaporizhzhia Oblast
- Raion: Vasylivka Raion
- Hromada: Stepnohirsk settlement hromada

Population (2001)
  - Total: 3,840
- Time zone: UTC+2 (EET)
  - Summer (DST): UTC+3 (EEST)

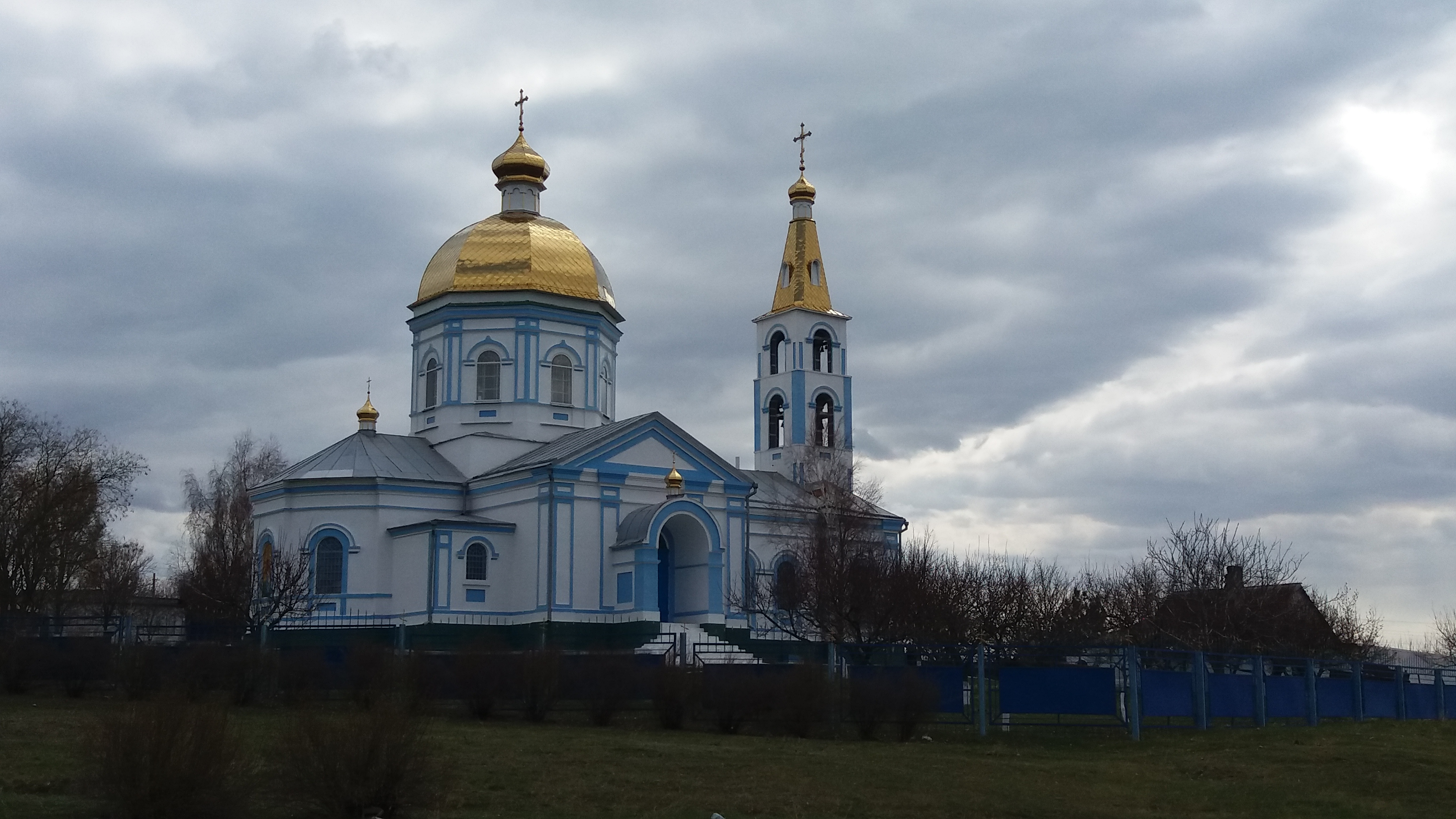

Prymorske (Ukrainian: Приморське; Russian: Приморское) is a village in Vasylivka Raion, Ukraine. It is located on the eastern side of the Kakhovka Reservoir, on the south side of the mouth of the Konka river, where the Konka enters the reservoir. In 2001, number of inhabitants was 3,840. In 2024, more than 1,000 people lived here.

== Geography ==
The village of Prymorske is located on the left bank of the Kakhovka Reservoir, downstream from the confluence of the Konka River (a tributary of the Dnieper) and the Konka River. Upstream, on the opposite bank of the bay, 5 km away, is the urban-type settlement of Malokaterynivka (Zaporizhzhia Raion) and 1.5 km downstream is the village of Plavni (Vasylivka Raion) and the village of Plavni. The village stretches along the shore for 10 km. Highways M-18 and E-105 are running nearby. A railway runs through the village, and Plavni Station is 2 km away.

== History ==
- 1750 — Zaporozhian Sich cossacks founded the village of "Tsar-Kut," which was subsequently renamed several times: "Tserkovny," "Podstepnoye," and "Tsarichansky Kut."
- 1886 — the village of Tsaritsin Kut (Veselyanskaya volost Melitopolsky Uyezd, Tavria Governorate) had 1474 people with 273 households. There was an Orthodox church, school and shop.
- 1964 — Renamed "Primorskoye."
- 1932-1933 — Prymorske suffered from the Holodomor, with many people being killed by hunger. The number of people who died from the Holodomor in Prymorske is unknown.
- 2025-2026 — Russian forces began infiltrating into Prymorske in December 2025 after capturing Kamianske. Ukrainian troops in the village were hit by drone strikes launched by drone operators of the Russian 7th Airborne division. Russian offensive operations in Prymorske continued into February 2026.

== Social services ==
- School.
- School No. 1, 1st-2nd class.
- Music School.
- Hospital.
- 2 first-aid stations.

== Landmarks ==
- Mass grave of Soviet soldiers.

== Demographics ==
As of the 2001 Ukrainian census, the town had a population of 3,840 inhabitants. The linguistic composition of the population was as follows:

Native languages in Prymorske
	percent
Ukrainian	85.1%
Russian	14.4%
Armenian	0.2%
Belarusian	0.1%
Bulgarian	0.1%
others	0.2%

== Notable people ==
- Pisarenko N. F. (1915–1974) — Red Army soldier of the Workers' and Peasants' Red Army, participant in the Great Patriotic War, Hero of the Soviet Union (1945).
- Gnedoy A. A. (1914–1983) — participant in the Great Patriotic War, captain, Hero of the Soviet Union (1945), awarded the Order of Lenin, two Orders of the Red Banner, the Order of Alexander Nevsky, the Order of the Patriotic War 1st degree, the Order of the Red Star and medals.

== Religion ==
- Holy Dormition Convent.
- Church of St. Nicholas the Wonderworker.
