= Mali Shcherbaky =

Village in Zaporizhzhia Oblast, Ukraine

Mali Shcherbaky Малі Щербаки
- Village
- Interactive map of Mali Shcherbaky
- Location of Mali Shcherbaky Mali Shcherbaky (Ukraine)
- Coordinates: 47°32′55″N 35°32′52″E
- Country: Ukraine
- Oblast: Zaporizhzhia Oblast
- Raion: Vasylivka Raion
- Hromada: Stepnohirsk settlement hromada
- Founded: 1832
- Elevation: 99 m (325 ft)

Population (2001)
  - Total: 351
- Time zone: UTC+2
  - Summer (DST): UTC+3
- Postal code: 71614
- Area code: +380 6175

Mali Shcherbaky is a village in Ukraine, in the Stepnohirsk settlement hromada of Vasylivka Raion of Zaporizhzhia Oblast. The local government body is the Stepnohirsk Settlement Council.

== Geography ==
The village of Mali Shcherbaky is located 1 km from the village of Shcherbaky and 3.5 km from the village of Stepove. The territorial highway T 0812 passes through the village. The nearest railway station is Plavni-Vantazhni, 26 km from the village.

== History ==
The village was founded in 1832 with the name Shcherbakovka.

On 12 June 2020, in accordance with the Resolution of the Cabinet of Ministers of Ukraine No. 713-r "On the Determination of Administrative Centers and Approval of Territories of Territorial Communities of Zaporizhia Region", it became part of the Stepnohirsk settlement hromada.

=== Russo-Ukrainian War ===
On 3 March 2022, fierce fighting began here. In May 2022, the village was recaptured from the Russian Armed Forces.

On 1 August 2022, Russian forces conducted airstikes on the village.

The village was later shelled by Russian forces on 7 February 2023 and 5 November 2024.

On March 17, 2025, Russian forces re-entered the village and Russian sources claimed the capture of Mali Shcherbaky and Shcherbaky.

On October 12, 2025, Ukrainian sources reported that Ukrainian forces had kicked out Russian forces from the village.

== Demographics ==
The population in 2024 is 2 people. According to the 2001 Ukrainian census, the village's population was 351 people. The main languages of the village were:

- Ukrainian 91.27%
- Russian 7.60%
- Gagauz 0.85%
- Belarusian 0.28%
