= Kamianka-Dniprovska Raion =

Former subdivision of Zaporizhzhia Oblast, Ukraine

Kamianka-Dniprovska Raion Кам'янсько-Дніпровський район
- Raion
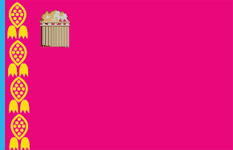
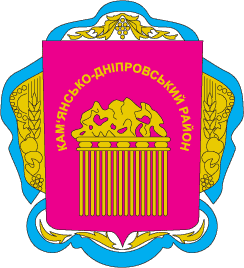
- Flag Coat of arms

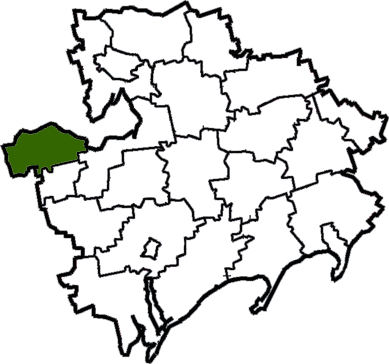
- Coordinates: 47°24′39.22″N 34°32′58.78″E
- Country: Ukraine
- Oblast: Zaporizhzhia Oblast
- Established: 1923
- Disestablished: 18 July 2020
- Admin. center: Kamianka-Dniprovska
- Subdivisions: List: 1 — city councils; 0 — settlement councils; 8 — rural councils; Number of localities: 1 — cities; 0 — urban-type settlements; 16 — villages; — rural settlements

Government
  - Governor: Sergiy Pankeev

Area
  - Total: 1,240 km^{2} (480 sq mi)

Population (2020)
  - Total: 38,365 ▼
  - Density: 30.9/km^{2} (80.1/sq mi)
- Time zone: UTC+02:00 (EET)
  - Summer (DST): UTC+03:00 (EEST)
- Postal index: 71300—71333
- Area code: +380 6138
- Website: http://kamenka.ucoz.ua

Kamianka-Dniprovska Raion (Ukrainian: Кам'янсько-Дніпровський район) was one of raions (districts) of Zaporizhzhia Oblast in southern Ukraine. The administrative center of the raion was the town of Kamianka-Dniprovska. The raion was abolished on 18 July 2020 as part of the administrative reform of Ukraine, which reduced the number of raions of Zaporizhzhia Oblast to five. The area of Kamianka-Dniprovska Raion was merged into Vasylivka Raion. The last estimate of the raion population was 38,365 (2020 est.).

== See also ==
- Mamai-Hora burial mounds
