= Stepnohirsk =

Rural locality in Zaporizhzhia Oblast, Ukraine

Stepnohirsk Степногірськ
- Rural settlement
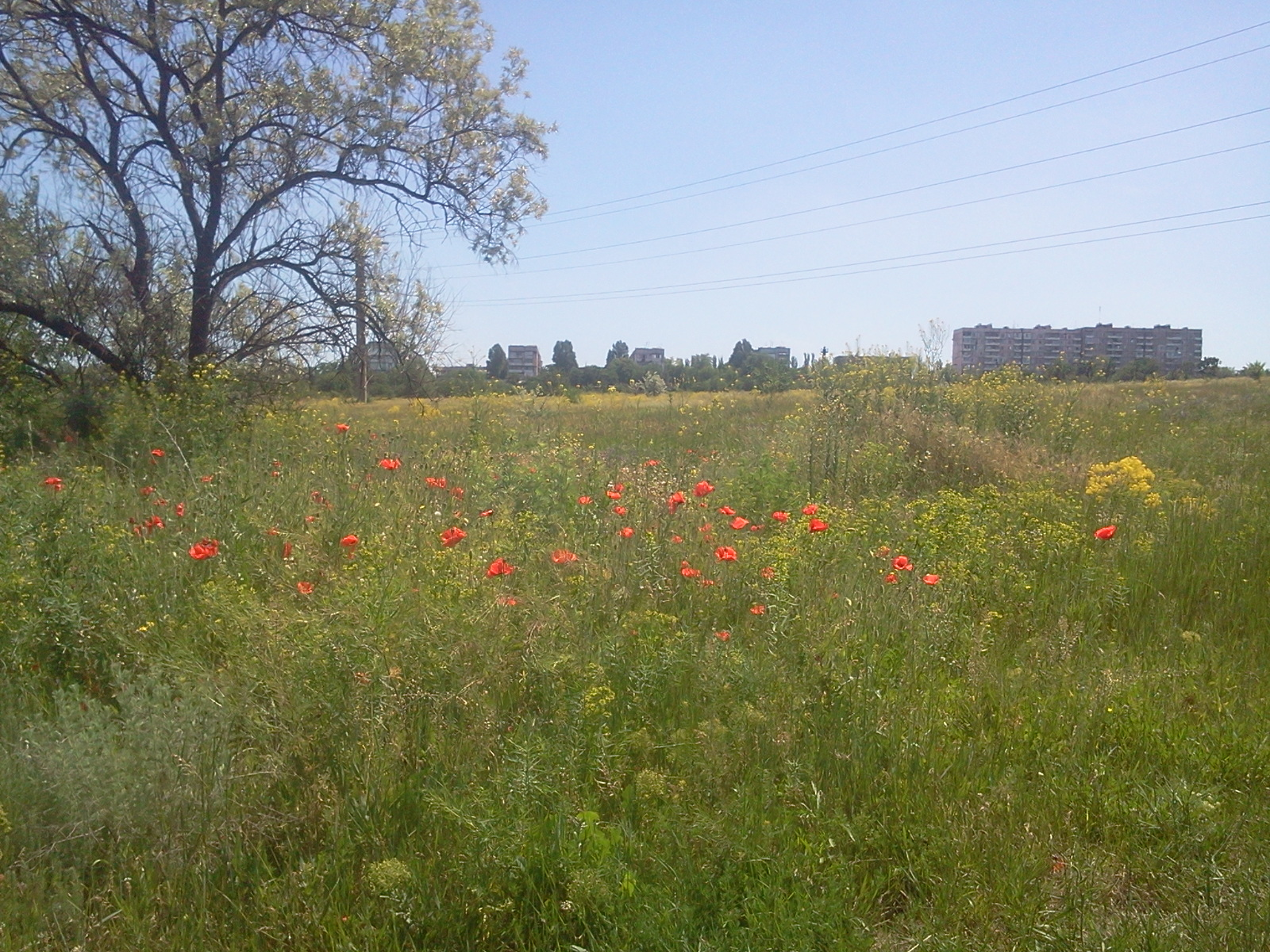

- Location in Zaporizhzhia Oblast Location in Ukraine
- Country: Ukraine
- Oblast: Zaporizhzhia Oblast
- Raion: Vasylivka Raion
- Hromada: Stepnohirsk settlement hromada

Population (2022)
  - Total: 4,294
- Time zone: UTC+2 (EET)
  - Summer (DST): UTC+3 (EEST)

Stepnohirsk (Ukrainian: Степногірськ; Russian: Степногорск) is a rural settlement in Vasylivka Raion, Zaporizhzhia Oblast, southern Ukraine. The settlement is located on the left bank of the Dnieper, adjacent to the Kakhovka Reservoir. Stepnohirsk hosts the administration of Stepnohirsk settlement hromada, one of the hromadas of Ukraine. Population: 4,294 (2022 estimate). By 2026, 28 people still lived in the settlement.

== Geography ==
The rural settlement of Stepnohirsk is located 2.5 km from the left bank of the former Kakhovka Reservoir on the river of Dnieper. The distance to the city of Zaporizhzhia is 31 km. The village of Plavni (Vasilievsky District) is 2 km away.

== History ==
In 1918, it was founded as the village of Sukhoivanovka. During the German invasion of the Soviet Union in World War 2(1941-1945), the village was under German occupation.

In 1987, it was renamed the urban-type settlement of Stepnogorsk. In January 1989, the population was 6,083 people.

Until 26 January 2024, Stepnohirsk was designated as an urban-type settlement. On this day, a new law entered into force which abolished this status, and Stepnohirsk became a rural settlement.

=== Russo-Ukrainian war ===
On 2 January 2025, a Russian airstrike struck the settlement, killing 1 person. On 14 September 2025, Russian Forces entered the south-eastern part of the settlement.

On 28 December 2025, Russia released a statement announcing capture of Stepnohirsk. Andriy Kovalenko, head of the Ukrainian Center for Counteracting Disinformation, said Russia does not control Stepnohirsk and stressed that Valery Gerasimov's claims about capturing the city are a falsehood. On 18 January 2026, Ukrinform confirmed partial Russian control of the settlement.

On 18 May 2026, the Main Intelligence Directorate of Ukraine reported that Russian forces have been cleared from the settlement.

== Demographics ==
1989	2001	2011	2012	2013	2016	2017	2018	2019
6083	4732	4505	4534	4510	4476	4450	4438	4420

As of the 2001 Ukrainian census, Stepnohirsk had a population of 4,822 inhabitants. The composition of the population by their first languages was as follows:

Native languages in Stepnohirsk
	percent
Ukrainian	52.5%
Russian	47.0%
Armenian	0.2%
Belarusian	0.1%
Bulgarian	0.1%
others	0.1%

== Economy ==
- Tavrichesky Mining and Processing Plant for manganese ore extraction. Closed in 1995.
- Stepnogorsk Mining and Processing Plant
- Zarya LLC
- Omela LLC
- Peremoga Agricultural Production Cooperative
- Dneprspetsstroy LLC
- Privatbank Joint-Stock Company
- Oschadbank
- Market

== Transport ==
The closest railway station, Plavni-Vantazhni, is about two kilometres (1.2 mi) west of the settlement, on the railway connecting Zaporizhzhia and Melitopol. There is some passenger traffic.

The settlement is also on highway M18, which connects Zaporizhzhia and Melitopol.

== Social services ==
- School. The school offers educational and cognitive children's clubs, music groups, dance classes, sports clubs, a library, and fitness groups.
- Inpatient hospital department and clinic.
- Pharmacies.
- Two preschools.
- Private dental office.
- Children's music school.

=== Religion ===
- Church in honor of the Holy Great Martyr Barbara;
- House of Prayer of Evangelical Christians-Baptists;
- Kingdom Hall of Jehovah's Witnesses.

=== Attractions ===
- The Alley of Glory Park of fallen soldiers during World War II.
- Two school stadiums with football fields, one of which hosts seasonal interregional football matches between town of the district.

== Notable people ==
- Yehor Demchenko (born 1997), Ukrainian footballer
