= Great Meadow =

Great Meadow may refer to:

- Great Meadow, Ukraine, a landform in south Ukraine once flooded by the now-destroyed Kakhovka Reservoir
  - Grand Meadow National Nature Park, a national park in Zaporizhzhia Oblast, Ukraine
- Great Meadow (events center), a steeplechase course in Plains, Virginia
- Great Meadow Correctional Facility, a prison in Comstock, New York
- The Great Meadow, a 1931 American film based on the Roberts novel
- The Great Meadow, 1930 novel by Elizabeth Madox Roberts

== See also ==
- Great Meadows (disambiguation)
