= Kasper Alhoniemi =

Finnish casualty of the Ukrainian war

Kasper Alhoniemi (2000 Tampere – 10 June 2023 Lobkove, Ukraine) was the first Finnish volunteer who fought on the side of Ukraine and fell in the Ukrainian war. Alhoniemi joined the International Legion established by the Ukrainian Armed Forces at the beginning of the war. In the battles, he participated in, among other things, the liberation of Kharkiv in autumn 2022.

Alhoniemi briefly returned to Finland, but traveled back to Ukraine in April 2023. He joined the special forces under the Ukrainian military intelligence HUR. Two other Finns also served in the same unit. The Ukrainian army awarded Alhoniemi's group with medals for their actions, and he was promoted to group leader.

He fell on June 10, 2023, near the village of Lobkove on the Zaporizhzhia front under tank fire. In the same battle, a Ukrainian soldier also fell and several fighters were wounded, including another Finnish volunteer. Alhoniemi was 23 years old when he died. His body could only be retrieved from the area in August. He was transported to Finland in November, when the Finland-Ukraine National Defense Association had managed to organize the transportation through a public fundraiser.

In civilian life, Alhoniemi worked as a machine fitter.
