= Novodniprovka =

Novodniprovka Новодніпровка
- Location within Zaporizhzhia Oblast Location within Ukraine
- Coordinates: 47°24′24″N 34°45′48″E
- Country: Ukraine

Population
  - Total: 1,640
- Area code: +380-71331
- Climate: Dfa

Novodniprovka (Ukrainian: Новодніпровка) is a village Vasylivka Raion in Zaporizhzhia Oblast in southern Ukraine that has a population of 1,640. The village is within 5 miles of the Zaporizhzhia Nuclear Power Plant.

An attempt for a Polish migrant to retrieve her 12-year-old son living in Novodniprovka was unsuccessful in early March 2022 and chronicled by a Wall Street Journal reporter.

== History ==
The area was settled by the Zaporozhian Cossacks in the 1740s. On 7 March 2022, the nearby town of Vasylika was captured by Russian forces during the 2022 Russian invasion of Ukraine.
