= Lobkove =

Lobkove Лобко́ве
- Village
- Interactive map of Lobkove
- Location in Zaporizhzhia Oblast Location in Ukraine
- Coordinates: 47°31′22″N 35°26′23″E
- Country: Ukraine
- Oblast: Zaporizhzhia Oblast
- Raion: Vasylivka Raion
- Hromada: Stepnohirsk settlement hromada
- Founded: 1892

Population (2022)
  - Total: 70
- KATOTTH: UA23040210030065095

Lobkove (Ukrainian: Лобко́ве) is a village in southern Ukraine, administratively located in Stepnohirsk settlement hromada, Vasylivka Raion, Zaporizhzhia Oblast. The population is 14 people.

Lobkove is located 52 kilometres (32 mi) from the regional center Zaporizhzhia City, and 19 kilometres (12 mi) from the district center Vasylivka. It is on the right bank of the Yanchekrak river. 1.5 kilometres (0.93 mi) downstream is the village of Kamianske. The Т 0812 highway runs nearby.

== History ==
The village was founded in 1892.

On 11 June 2023, after a long stretch of occupation by Russian forces during the Russian invasion of Ukraine, the Ukrainian Armed Forces liberated the village as part of the 2023 Ukrainian counteroffensive. According to Stepnohirsk settlement hromada head Iryna Kondratyuk, the village had been completely depopulated by the time it was recaptured. Prior to the invasion, about 70 people lived in Lobkove, almost all of whom left during the occupation. On 25 March 2025, the village was contested by Russian forces. By 2 April 2025, Russian forces recaptured the settlement.

== Demographics ==
As of the 2001 Ukrainian census, the village had a population of 99 inhabitants. The linguistic composition of the population was as follows:

Native languages in Lobkove
	percent
Ukrainian	79.8%
Russian	18.2%
Belarusian	1.0%
Bulgarian	1.0%
others	0.0%
