= Kamianka-Dniprovska urban hromada =

Kamianka-Dniprovska urban hromada Кам'янсько-Дніпровська міська громада
- Hromada
- Interactive map of Kamianka-Dniprovska urban hromada
- Country: Ukraine
- Oblast: Zaporizhzhia Oblast
- Raion: Vasylivka Raion

Area
  - Total: 435.9 km^{2} (168.3 sq mi)

Population (2020)
  - Total: 19,967
  - Density: 45.81/km^{2} (118.6/sq mi)
- Settlements: 3
- Cities: 1
- Villages: 2

Kamianka-Dniprovska urban hromada (Ukrainian: Кам'янсько-Дніпровська міська громада) is a hromada of Ukraine, located in Vasylivka Raion, Zaporizhzhia Oblast. Its administrative center is the city Kamianka-Dniprovska.

It has an area of 435.9 square kilometres (168.3 mi^{2}) and a population of 19,967, as of 2020.

The hromada contains 3 settlements: 1 city (Kamianka-Dniprovska) and 2 villages (Velyka Znamianka and Novooleksiivka).

== See also ==
- List of hromadas of Ukraine
