= Vasylivka urban hromada =

Vasylivka urban hromada Василівська міська громада
- Hromada
- Interactive map of Vasylivka urban hromada
- Country: Ukraine
- Oblast: Zaporizhzhia
- Raion: Vasylivka

Area
  - Total: 721.5 km^{2} (278.6 sq mi)

Population (2020)
  - Total: 20,922
  - Density: 29.00/km^{2} (75.10/sq mi)
- Settlements: 18
- Cities: 1
- Villages: 17

Vasylivka urban hromada (Ukrainian: Василівська міська громада) is a hromada of Ukraine, located in Vasylivka Raion, Zaporizhzhia Oblast. Its administrative center is the city Vasylivka.

It has an area of 721.5 square kilometres (278.6 mi^{2}) and a population of 20,922, as of 2020.

The hromada contains 18 settlements: 1 city (Vasylivka) and 17 villages:

- Verkhnya Krynytsia
- Gladke
- Grozove
- Dolinka
- Zeleny Gai
- Kamianske
- Konovalova
- Lisne
- Lugove
- Peremozhne
- Pershotravneve
- Pidhirne
- Plavni
- Skelky
- Ternuvate
- Shevchenko
- Shiroke

== See also ==
- List of hromadas of Ukraine
