= Velyka Bilozerka rural hromada =

Velyka Bilozerka rural hromada Великобілозерська селищна громада
- Hromada
- Interactive map of Velyka Bilozerka rural hromada
- Country: Ukraine
- Oblast: Zaporizhzhia
- Raion: Vasylivka

Area
  - Total: 470.9 km^{2} (181.8 sq mi)

Population (2020)
  - Total: 7,548
  - Density: 16.03/km^{2} (41.51/sq mi)
- Settlements: 5
- Villages: 5

Velyka Bilozerka rural hromada (Ukrainian: Великобілозерська селищна громада) is a hromada of Ukraine, located in Vasylivka Raion, Zaporizhzhia Oblast. Its administrative center is the village of Velyka Bilozerka.

It has an area of 470.9 square kilometres (181.8 mi^{2}) and a population of 7,548, as of 2020.

The hromada contains 5 settlements, which are all villages:

- Velyka Bilozerka
- Gyunivka
- Zelena Balka
- Kachkarivka
- Novopetrivka

== See also ==
- List of hromadas of Ukraine
