= Dniprorudne =

City in Zaporizhzhia Oblast, Ukraine

Dniprorudne Дніпрорудне
- City
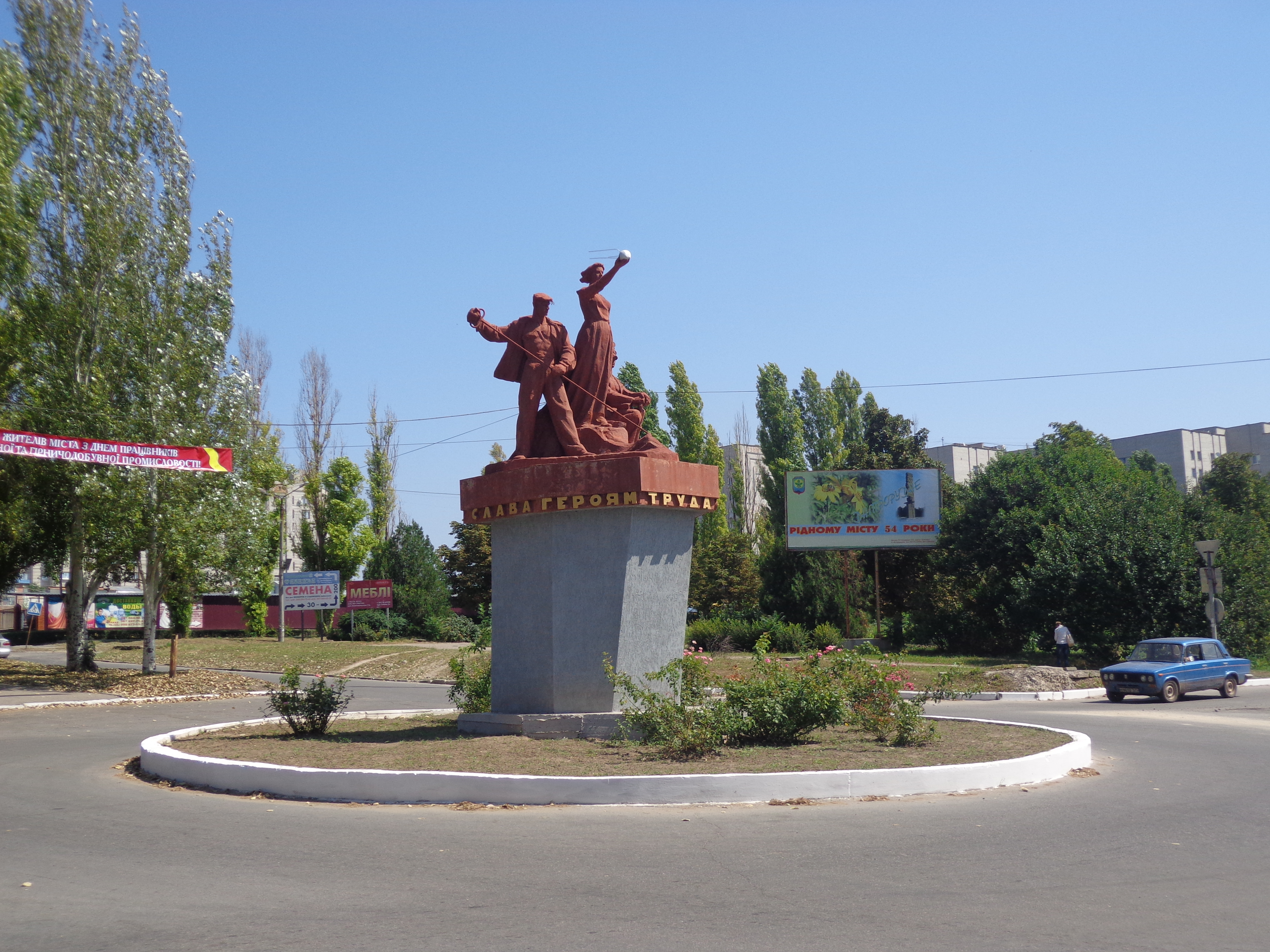
- Steelworkers' monument in Dniprorudne

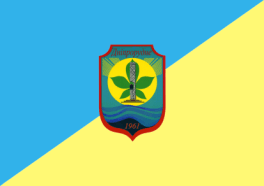
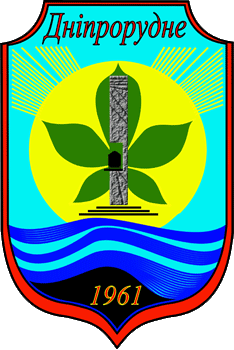
- Flag Coat of arms
- Interactive map of Dniprorudne
- Location of Dniprorudne Dniprorudne (Ukraine)
- Coordinates: 47°23′10.8″N 34°59′49.3″E
- Country: Ukraine
- Oblast: Zaporizhzhia Oblast
- Raion: Vasylivka Raion
- Hromada: Dniprorudne urban hromada
- Founded: 1961
- Incorporated: 1970

Government
  - Mayor: Mykola Pastushenko (de facto)

Area
  - Total: 7.784 km^{2} (3.005 sq mi)

Population (2022)
  - Total: 17,736
- Postal code: 71630
- Area code: +380 6175
- Climate: Dfa

Dniprorudne (Ukrainian: Дніпрорудне, pronounced [d⁽ʲ⁾n⁽ʲ⁾iproˈrudne]; Russian: Днепрорудное, romanized: Dneprorudnoye) is a city in Vasylivka Raion of Zaporizhzhia Oblast, Ukraine. The population is 17,736 (2022 estimate).

== History ==
Dniprorudne has had city status since 1970.

During the first weeks of the 2022 Russian invasion of Ukraine the city was captured by the Russian army. On 13 March 2022 the Ukrainian government accused the Russian military of abducting Dniprorudne's mayor Yevhen Matvieyev, who protested along local residents against the Russian occupation of the city, including participating in a 27 February protest preventing Russian tanks from entering the town. On 4 December 2024, the Ukrainian government reported that he died in Russian captivity, having been tortured, and that his body had been returned to Ukraine.

== Demographics ==
The city had 22,773 inhabitants in January 1989. As of the 2001, the city had a population of 21,271. The majority of the population are Ukrainians, while Russians form the biggest minority. The town is almost equally Russo and Ukrainophone.

Ethnic groups in Dniprorudne
	percent
Ukrainians	60.82%
Russians	36.64%
Belarusians	0.74%
Armenians	0.31%
Bulgarians	0.21%
Tatars	0.21%
Germans	0.16%
Azerbaijanis	0.08%

Native languages in Dniprorudne
Languages	percent
Russian	53.5%
Ukrainian	45.9%
Armenian	0.2%
Belarusian	0.1%
others	0.2%

== Transport ==
The city has an inland port.

== Gallery ==
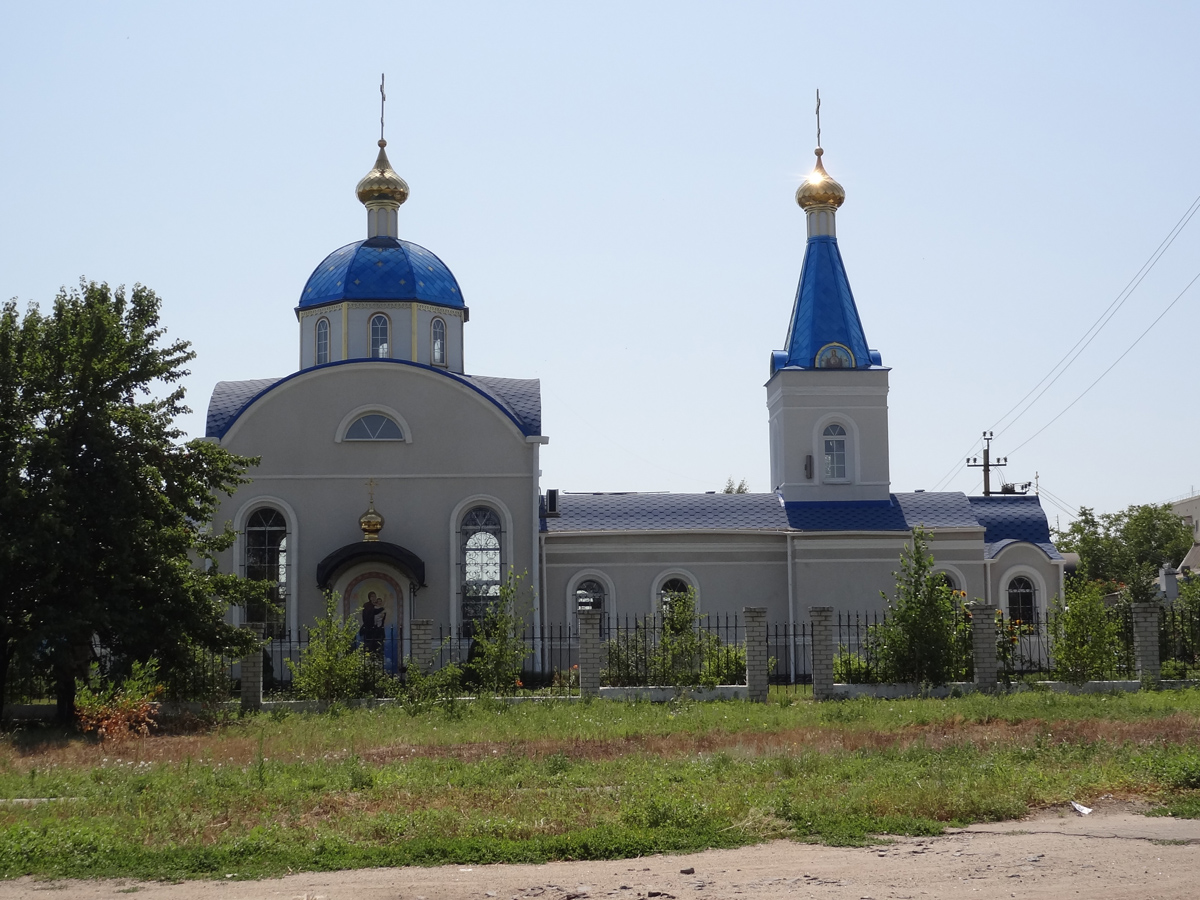
Church of the Dormition

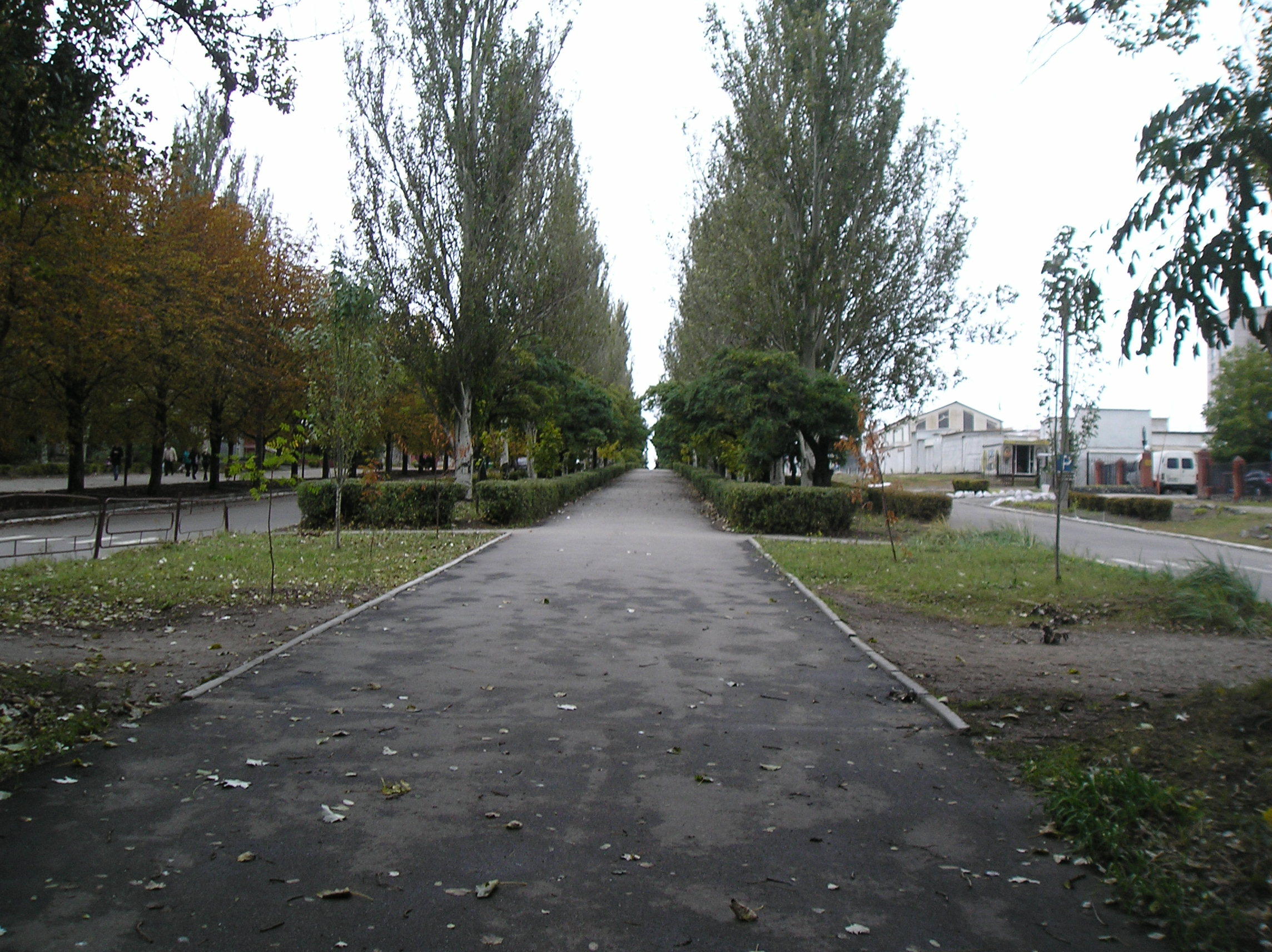
Central alley

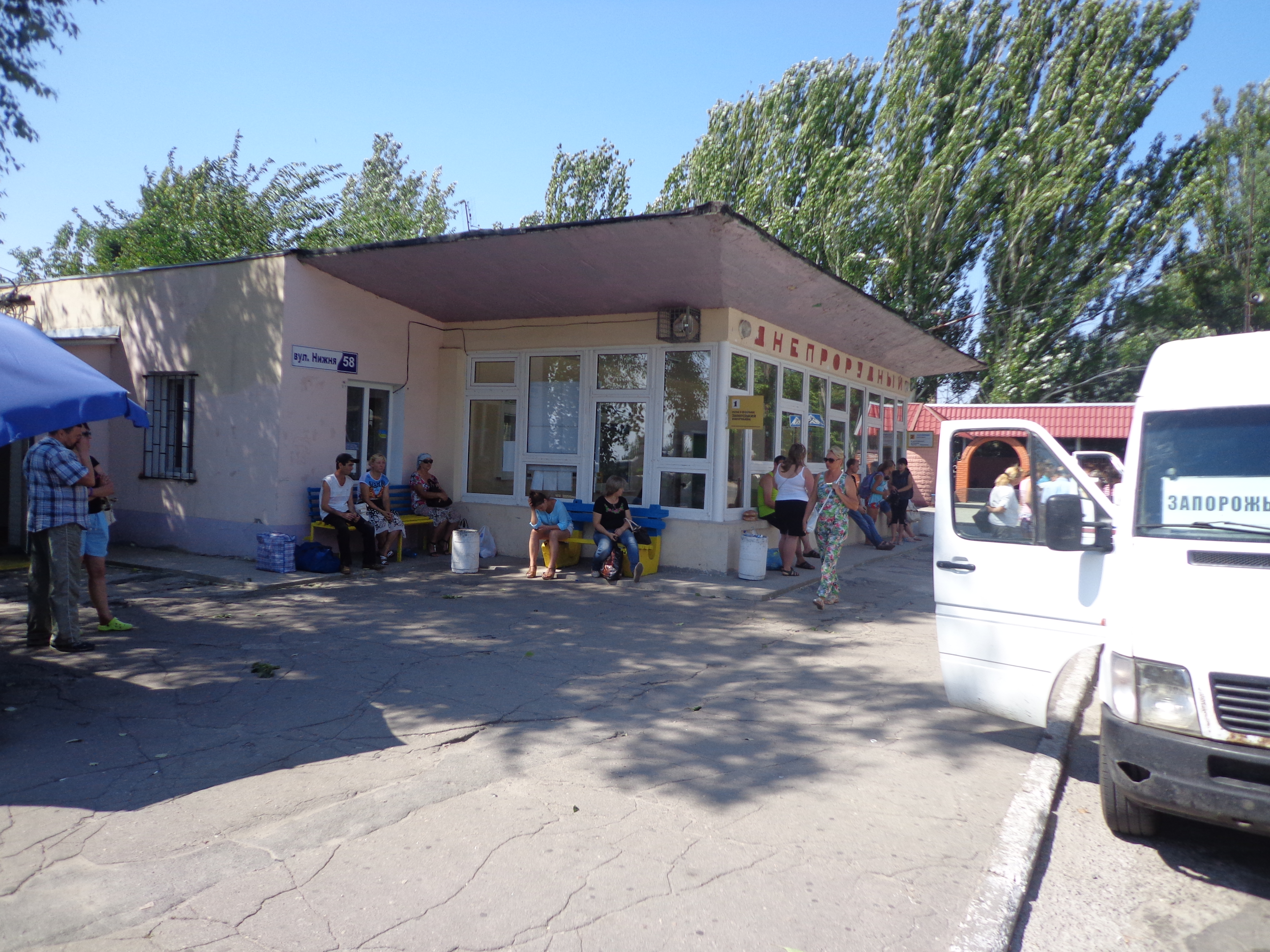
Bus station

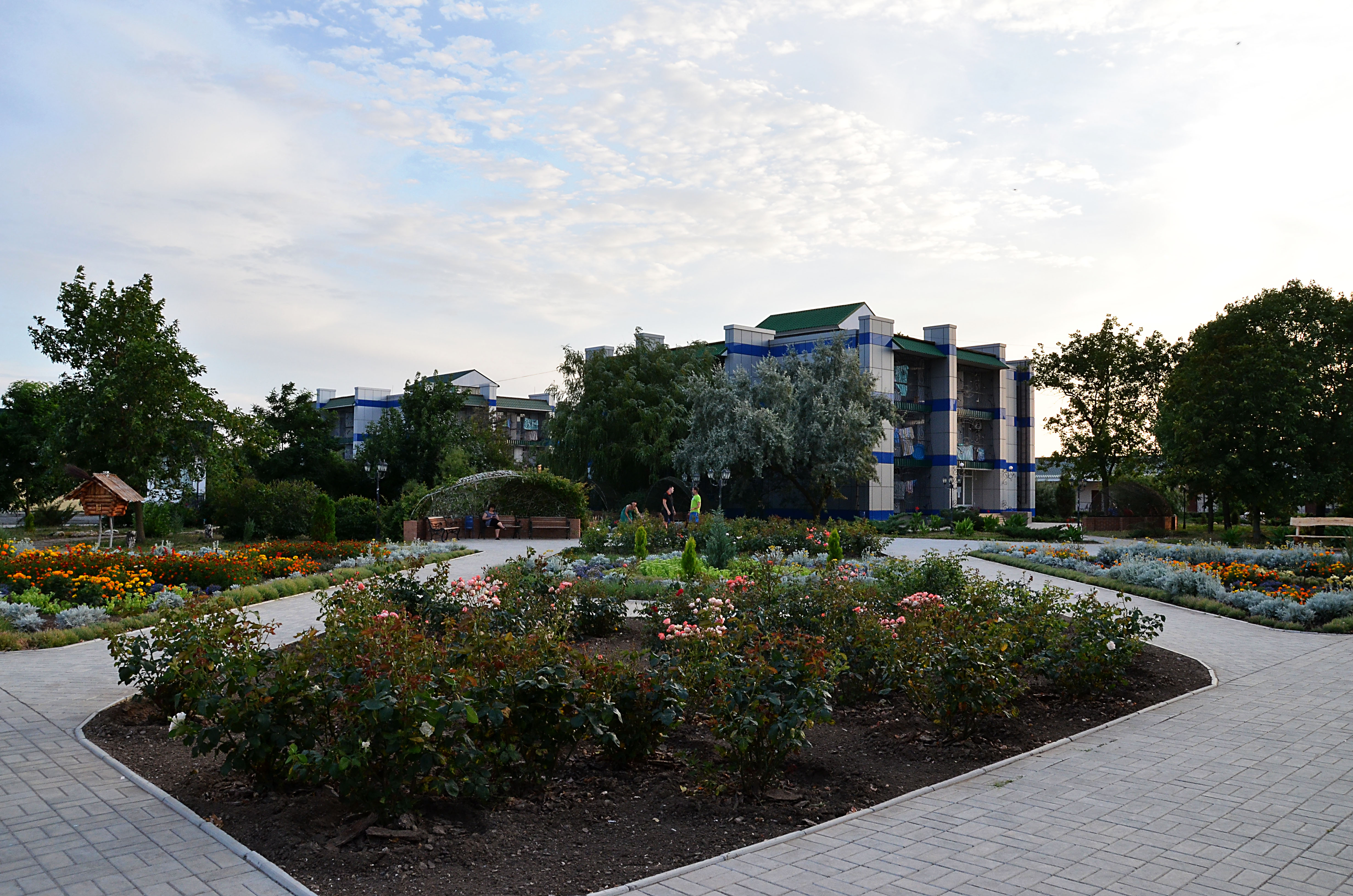
Recreation centre

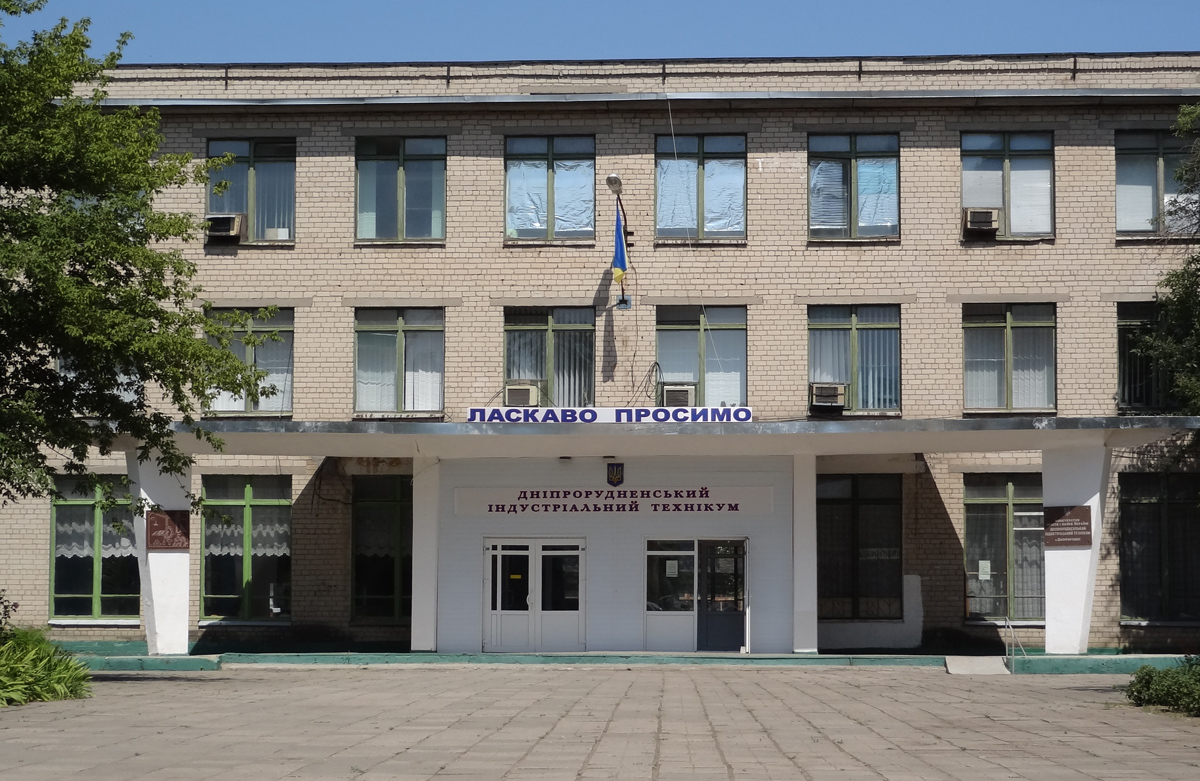
Industrial college
