= Great Meadows =

Great Meadows may refer to:

- Great Meadows, New Jersey, an unincorporated area within Liberty Township, New Jersey
- Battle of the Great Meadows or Battle of Fort Necessity, a 1754 battle of the French and Indian War in Pennsylvania
- Great Meadows National Wildlife Refuge, a wildlife refuge in Concord, Massachusetts
- Great Meadows Salt Marsh, a unit of the Stewart B. McKinney National Wildlife Refuge in Connecticut

== See also ==
- Great Meadow (disambiguation)
