= Rozdol rural hromada =

Rozdol rural hromada Роздольська селищна громада
- Hromada
- Interactive map of Rozdol rural hromada
- Country: Ukraine
- Oblast: Zaporizhzhia Oblast
- Raion: Vasylivka Raion

Area
  - Total: 418.3 km^{2} (161.5 sq mi)

Population (2020)
  - Total: 6,558
  - Density: 15.68/km^{2} (40.61/sq mi)
- Settlements: 32
- Villages: 32

Rozdol rural hromada (Ukrainian: Роздольська селищна громада) is a hromada of Ukraine, located in Vasylivka Raion, Zaporizhzhia Oblast. Its administrative center is the village of Rozdol.

It has an area of 418.3 square kilometres (161.5 mi^{2}) and a population of 6,558, as of 2020.

The hromada contains 32 settlements, which are all villages:

- Abrykosivka
- Barvinivka
- Vynohradivka
- Vysoke
- Vyshneve
- Vyshnivka
- Vodne
- Volodymyrivka
- Dniprovka
- Zavitne
- Zelenyi Hai
- Kavunivka
- Kokhane
- Lymanivka
- Liubymivka
- Nove Pole
- Novohorivka
- Novoliubymivka
- Peremozhne
- Rivne
- Rozdol
- Sadove
- Solovivka
- Stepove
- Suvore
- Tavriia
- Traktorne
- Trudovyk
- Trudoliubymivka
- Ukrainka
- Chornozemne
- Shevchenka

== See also ==
- List of hromadas of Ukraine
