= Vodiane rural hromada, Zaporizhzhia Oblast =

Vodiane rural hromada Водянська селищна громада
- Hromada
- Interactive map of Vodiane rural hromada
- Country: Ukraine
- Oblast: Zaporizhzhia
- Raion: Vasylivka

Area
  - Total: 365.2 km^{2} (141.0 sq mi)

Population (2020)
  - Total: 11,722
  - Density: 32.10/km^{2} (83.13/sq mi)
- Settlements: 8
- Rural settlements: 1
- Villages: 7

Vodiane rural hromada (Ukrainian: Водянська селищна громада) is a hromada of Ukraine, located in Vasylivka Raion, Zaporizhzhia Oblast. Its administrative center is the village of Vodiane.

It has an area of 365.2 square kilometres (141.0 mi^{2}) and a population of 11,722, as of 2020.

The hromada contains 8 settlements, including 7 villages:

- Vodiane
- Dniprovka
- Michurina
- Novovodiane
- Novoukrainka
- Prymirne
- Stepove

And 1 rural-type settlement: Zapovitne.

== See also ==
- List of hromadas of Ukraine
