= Blahovishchenka rural hromada =

Blahovishchenka rural hromada Благовіщенська селищна громада
- Hromada
- Interactive map of Blahovishchenka rural hromada
- Country: Ukraine
- Oblast: Zaporizhzhia Oblast
- Raion: Vasylivka Raion

Area
  - Total: 299.7 km^{2} (115.7 sq mi)

Population (2020)
  - Total: 6,195
  - Density: 20.67/km^{2} (53.54/sq mi)
- Settlements: 7
- Villages: 7

Blahovishchenka rural hromada (Ukrainian: Благовіщенська селищна громада) is a hromada of Ukraine, located in Vasylivka Raion, Zaporizhzhia Oblast. Its administrative center is the village of Blahovishchenka.

It has an area of 299.7 square kilometres (115.7 mi^{2}) and a population of 6,195, as of 2020.

The hromada contains 7 settlements, which are all villages:

- Blahovishchenka
- Hurtove
- Ivanivka
- Novodniprovka
- Podove
- Tsvitkove
- Shliakhove

== See also ==
- List of hromadas of Ukraine
