= Kamianske, Vasylivka Raion, Zaporizhzhia Oblast =

Kamianske Кам'янське
- Village
- Location within Zaporizhzhia Oblast Location within Ukraine
- Coordinates: 47°32′24″N 35°22′22″E
- Country: Ukraine
- Oblast: Zaporizhzhia Oblast
- Raion: Vasylivka Raion
- Hromada: Vasylivka urban hromada

Population (2019)
  - Total: 2,054

Kamianske (Ukrainian: Кам'янське) is a village (selo) of Ukraine, in Vasylivka Raion, Zaporizhzhia Oblast. Its population is 2,054. Until 1945, its name was Yanchekrak (Янчекрак).

== History ==
The village of Yanchekrak was founded in the 1790s on the location of a former Cossack winter homestead by people who were originally from Petrivka in Kherson Governorate and was named after the nearby Yanchekrak River. By 1866 the population had risen to 2,020 people. On the eve of World War I the village consisted of 635 homesteads with 4,778 inhabitants.

The Ukrainian Institute of National Memory estimates that at least 371 villagers of Kamianske died in the Holodomor. On March 13, 2015, a monument to Vladimir Lenin was demolished in the village.

=== 2022 Russian invasion ===
By March 2022, Kamianske was near the front line of the southern theatre during the Russian invasion of Ukraine, and had become the site of prisoner exchanges including that of Melitopol mayor Ivan Fedorov. By May, trenches had been dug near Kamianske. On 4 September 2023 the Ukrainian Armed Forces were able to gain a foothold in the southern part of the city due to Russian troops abandoning their positions. About 80% of the village was reported to be under the control of the Ukrainian forces.

In October 2024, combat around Kamianske renewed as Russian forces advanced, both near Kamianske and the adjacent Plavni, following a reported unsuccessful Ukrainian attack. The village was captured by Russian forces in July 2025.

== Demographics ==
As of the 2001 Ukrainian census, Kamianske had a population of 2,639 inhabitants. The composition of the population by their native languages was as follows:

Native languages in Kamianske
	percent
Ukrainian	87.5%
Russian	12.1%
Armenian	0.2%
Belarusian	0.1%
others	0.1%
