= Dniprorudne urban hromada =

Dniprorudne urban hromada Дніпрорудненська міська громада
- Hromada
- Interactive map of Dniprorudne urban hromada
- Country: Ukraine
- Oblast: Zaporizhzhia Oblast
- Raion: Vasylivka Raion

Area
  - Total: 47.6 km^{2} (18.4 sq mi)

Population (2020)
  - Total: 18,468
  - Density: 388/km^{2} (1,000/sq mi)
- Settlements: 3
- Cities: 1
- Villages: 2

Dniprorudne urban hromada (Ukrainian: Дніпрорудненська міська громада) is a hromada of Ukraine, located in Vasylivka Raion, Zaporizhzhia Oblast. Its administrative center is the city Dniprorudne.

It has an area of 47.6 square kilometres (18.4 mi^{2}) and a population of 18,468, as of 2020.

The hromada contains 3 settlements: 1 city (Dniprorudne) and 2 villages (Zlatopil and Maiachka).

== See also ==
- List of hromadas of Ukraine
