= Boris Grakov =

Boris Nikolayevich Grakov (Russian: Борис Николаевич Граков) (13 December [O.S. 1 December] 1899, in Onega – September 14, 1970, in Moscow) was a Soviet and Russian archaeologist, who specialized in Scythian and Sarmatian archeology, classical philology, and ancient epigraphy.

Grakov was graduated from the Faculty of History and Philology division of Moscow State University in 1922. He began performing excavations near the Volga river and the Ural Mountains in 1925 and, as of 1937, in Ukraine. He was awarded a Doctor of Science degree in history in 1939, after which he became a professor at the university.

Grakov systematized the huge amount of existing information on ceramic stamps of Ancient Greece and created the full catalog of such ceramic stamps from the Northern Black Sea region. During 1938-41 and 1944-52, he excavated Kamenskoe Gorodishche near Nikopol. This was a large center of the Bronze Age and Iron Age culture of Scythians.

He resolved issues that existed about Scythian ethnic geography and about the social structure and industries of Scythians and Sarmatians. He identified the main milestones within the sixth to fourth century BC Sarmatian culture in the regions of Volga and Ural. In particular, between 1945 and 1947, he proposed the four-phase periodization scheme for history and culture of Sarmatian tribes in those regions.

Grakov was an important mentor to Anna Melyukova, who became his collaborator on researching and publishing material on the Scythians, and upon his death, who succeeded him as the head of the department of Scythology at Moscow State University.

Grakov was awarded the Order of the Red Banner of Labour and various medals.

== See also ==
- Mamai-Hora
