= Mala Bilozerka rural hromada =

Mala Bilozerka rural hromada Малобілозерська селищна громада
- Hromada
- Interactive map of Mala Bilozerka rural hromada
- Country: Ukraine
- Oblast: Zaporizhzhia Oblast
- Raion: Vasylivka Raion

Area
  - Total: 623.4 km^{2} (240.7 sq mi)

Population (2020)
  - Total: 12,426
  - Density: 19.93/km^{2} (51.63/sq mi)
- Settlements: 8
- Villages: 8

Mala Bilozerka rural hromada (Ukrainian: Малобілозерська селищна громада) is a hromada of Ukraine, located in Vasylivka Raion, Zaporizhzhia Oblast. Its administrative center is the village of Mala Bilozerka.

It has an area of 623.4 square kilometres (240.7 mi^{2}) and a population of 12,426, as of 2020.

The hromada contains 8 settlements, which are all villages:

- Balky
- Vidnozhyne
- Mala Bilozerka
- Novobilozerka
- Orlianske
- Topolyne
- Ulianivka
- Yasna Poliana

== See also ==
- List of hromadas of Ukraine
