= Stepove, Stepnohirsk settlement hromada, Vasylivka Raion, Zaporizhzhia Oblast =

Coordinates: 47°32′23″N 35°27′52″E

Stepove (Ukrainian: Степове) is a village in southern Ukraine, Stepnohirsk settlement hromada, Vasylivka Raion, Zaporizhzhia Oblast. It has a population of 118.

== History ==
It was founded in 1921 as a farm named Neikron (Ukrainian: Нейкрон). In 1945, by edict of the government of the Ukrainian SSR Neikron was given its modern name, Stepove.

== Demographics ==
As of the 2001 Ukrainian census, the village had a population of 118 inhabitants. The linguistic composition of the population was as follows:

Native languages in Stepove
	percent
Ukrainian	89.8%
Russian	10.2%
others	0.0%
