= Stepnohirsk settlement hromada =

Stepnohirsk settlement hromada Степногірська селищна громада
- Hromada
- Interactive map of Stepnohirsk settlement hromada
- Country: Ukraine
- Oblast: Zaporizhzhia Oblast
- Raion: Vasylivka Raion

Government
  - Head: Iryna Kondratyuk

Area
  - Total: 235.3 km^{2} (90.8 sq mi)

Population (2020)
  - Total: 8,251
  - Density: 35.07/km^{2} (90.82/sq mi)
- Settlements: 9
- Villages: 8
- Towns: 1

Stepnohirsk settlement hromada (Ukrainian: Степногірська селищна громада) is a hromada of Ukraine, located in Vasylivka Raion, Zaporizhzhia Oblast. Its administrative center is the town of Stepnohirsk. As of 2023, the head of the hromada is Iryna Kondratyuk.

It has an area of 235.3 square kilometres (90.8 mi^{2}) and a population of 8,251, as of 2020.

The hromada includes 9 settlements: the town of Stepnohirsk and 8 villages:

- Zherebianky
- Lobkove
- Lukianivske
- Mali Shcherbaky
- Pavlivka
- Prymorske
- Piatykhatky
- Stepove

== Demographics ==
As of the 2001 Ukrainian census, the hromada had a population of 10,013 inhabitants. The composition of the population by their native languages was as follows:

Native languages (2001)
	percent
Ukrainian	70.0%
Russian	29.4%
Armenian	0.2%
Belarusian	0.1%
Bulgarian	0.1%
others	0.1%

== See also ==
- List of hromadas of Ukraine
