= Plavni, Zaporizhzhia Oblast =

Rural locality in Zaporizhzhia Oblast, Ukraine

Plavni Плавні
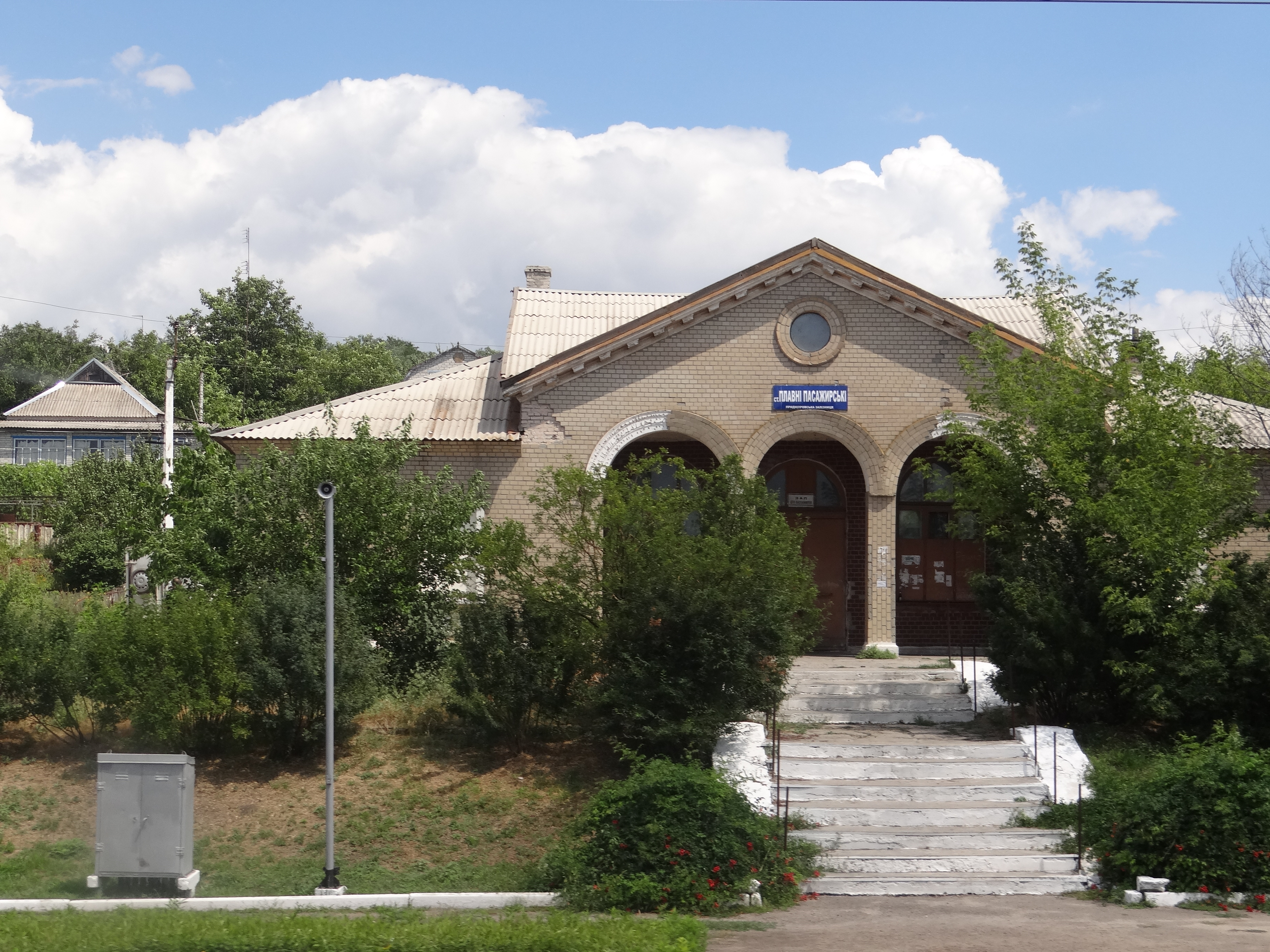
- Plavni railway station
- Interactive map of Plavni
- Location in Ukraine Plavni (Ukraine)
- Coordinates: 47°33′46″N 35°19′50″E
- Country: Ukraine
- Oblast: Zaporizhzhia Oblast
- Raion: Vasylivka Raion
- Elevation: 30 m (98 ft)

Population (2023)
  - Total: 73
- Time zone: UTC+2 (EET)
  - Summer (DST): UTC+3 (EEST)
- Postal code: 71613
- Area code: +380 6175

Plavni (Ukrainian: Плавні) is a village in Vasylivka urban hromada, Vasylivka Raion, Zaporizhzhia Oblast, southern Ukraine. The population was 329 at the 2001 Ukrainian census.

== History ==
=== Russo-Ukrainian War ===
On 6 October 2024, during the Russian invasion of Ukraine, the village was entered by Russian forces from the south amidst a reported increase in combat in the area. They were later pushed out of the settlement.

The village was once again stormed by Russian forces in July 2025 and by the 27th of August, Russian forces had seized the settlement.
