= Grand Meadow National Nature Park =

National park in Ukraine

- Ukrainian: Великий Луг (Velykyi Luh)
- IUCN category II (national park)
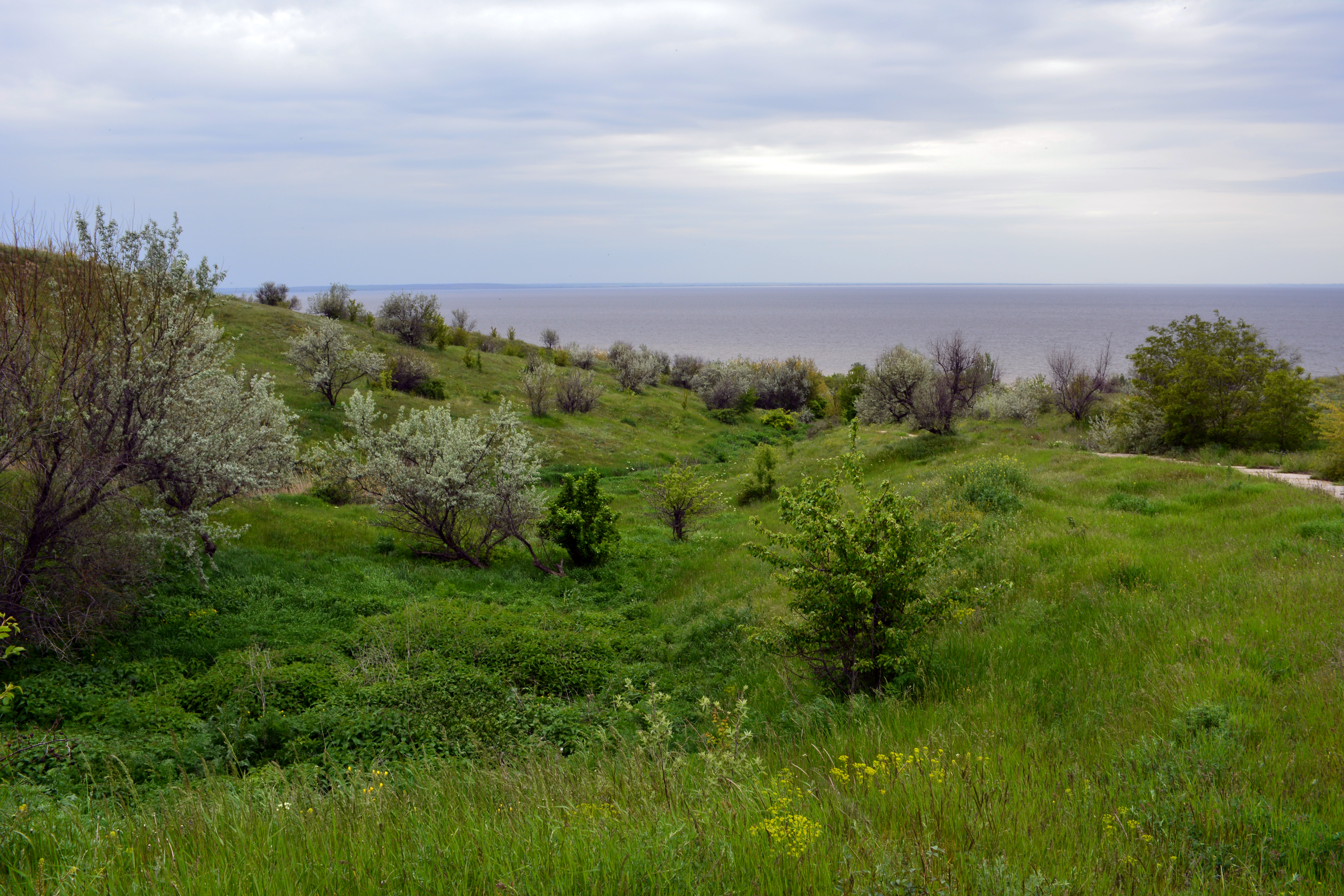
- Great Meadow National Nature Park, on the Dnieper River

- Location within Ukraine
- Location: Zaporizhzhia Oblast, Vasylivka Raion
- Nearest city: Vasylivka
- Coordinates: 47.3822°N 34.9869°E
- Area: 16,756 hectares (41,405 acres; 168 km^{2}; 65 sq mi)
- Established: 2006
- Governing body: Ministry of Ecology and Natural Resources
- Website: www.grandmeadow.org.ua

The Grand Meadow National Nature Park (Ukrainian: Національний природний парк «Великий Луг», romanized: Velykyj Luh) covers historic steppe terrain in southeast Ukraine. It is on the south bank of the Dnieper River's Kakhovka Reservoir, which was created by the Dnieper Hydroelectric Station. The meadows and reed beds on the shore support one of the largest transmigration spots for birds in Eastern Europe. The park is in the administrative district of Vasylivka Raion in Zaporizhzhia Oblast.

== Topography ==
The park is mostly situated on the terrace floodplain of the south side of the Dnieper River. Because most of the terrace, historically known as the Great Meadow, was inundated by the creation of the reservoir, the park's territory is mostly ridges and coastal strips along the shore. One of the ecologically protected areas of the park is the Sim Maiakiv Floodplain, a Ramsar wetland site that houses high levels of biodiversity in the steppe-forest and reed beds of the mouth of one of the reservoir's tributaries.

The site is located in the northwest of the larger region of the Black Sea Lowland.

Following the destruction of the Kakhovka Dam during the Russian invasion of Ukraine in 2023, the park was reported by the Ukrainian Environment Ministry to have been completely dried up following the draining of the Kakhovka Reservoir, raising fears of a drought.

== Climate and ecoregion ==
The official climate designation for the Great Meadow area is humid continental climate - warm summer sub-type (Köppen climate classification Dfb), with large seasonal temperature differentials and a warm summer (at least four months averaging over 10 °C (50 °F), but no month averaging over 22 °C (72 °F). The park is in the Pontic–Caspian steppe ecoregion.

== Flora and fauna ==
The park is an important transmigration, nesting, and foraging area for waterbirds. The karst topography provides a mechanism for filtering water, the floodplain with highly variable water coverage provides foraging grounds, and the limestone coastal cliffs provide nesting areas for the birds.

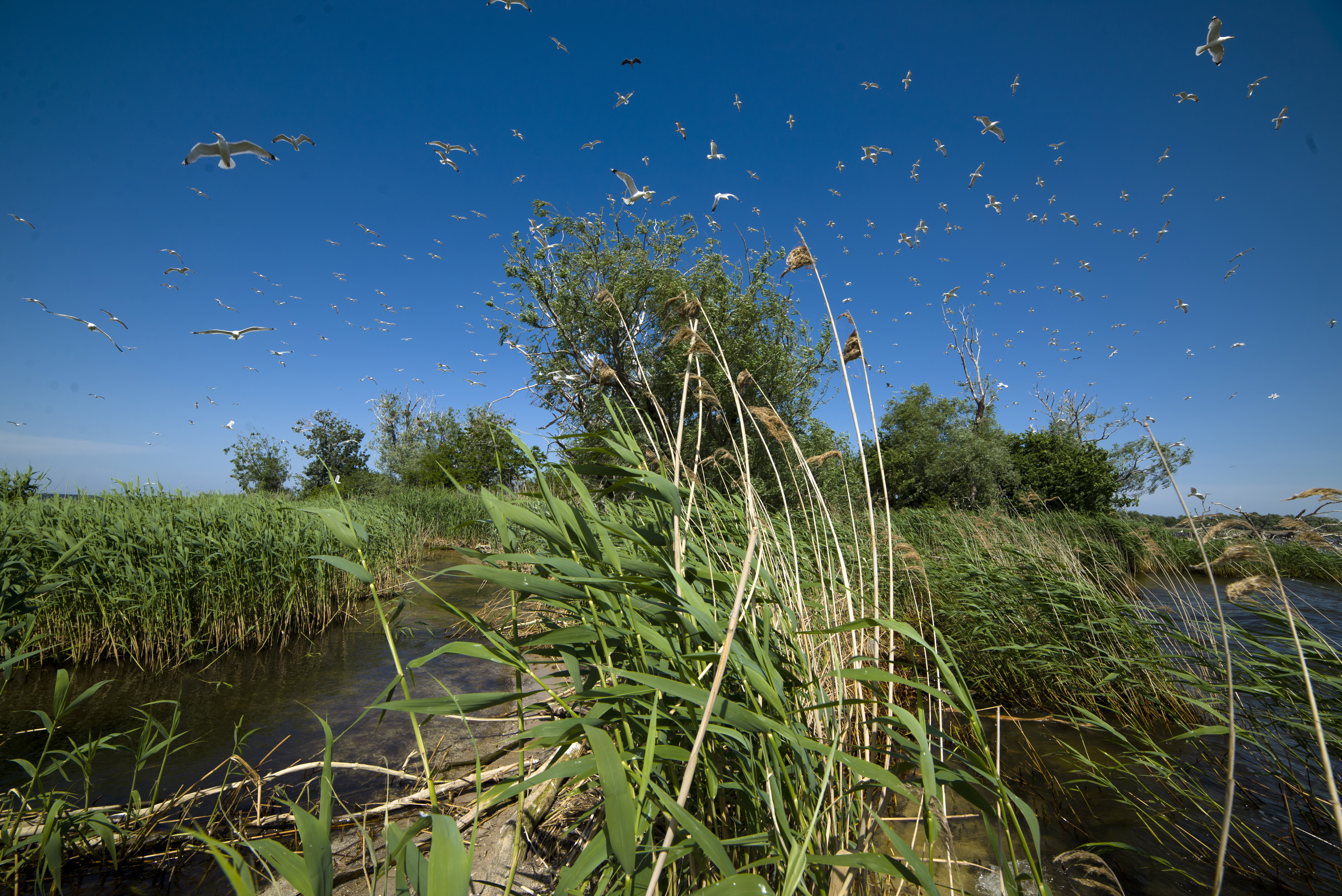
Birds in flight over reed beds in Velyka Luga

The warm, flat, shallow portion of the terrace that is submerged provides an extensive habitat for feeding fish. The unique karst sinkholes of the area support large colonies, and many species of, bats

== Public use ==
The park was designed to include dedicated sectors for protection of nature, recreation, cultural and historical tourism and study, and buffer zones. Staff in the park sponsor educational and ecological awareness activities for local children and adults. The park currently has four health activity trails, a hiking/bicycle route, and four ecological study trails.

== See also ==
- National Parks of Ukraine
