= Kamianka-Dniprovska =

City in Zaporizhzhia Oblast, Ukraine

Kamianka-Dniprovska Кам'янка-Дніпровська
- City
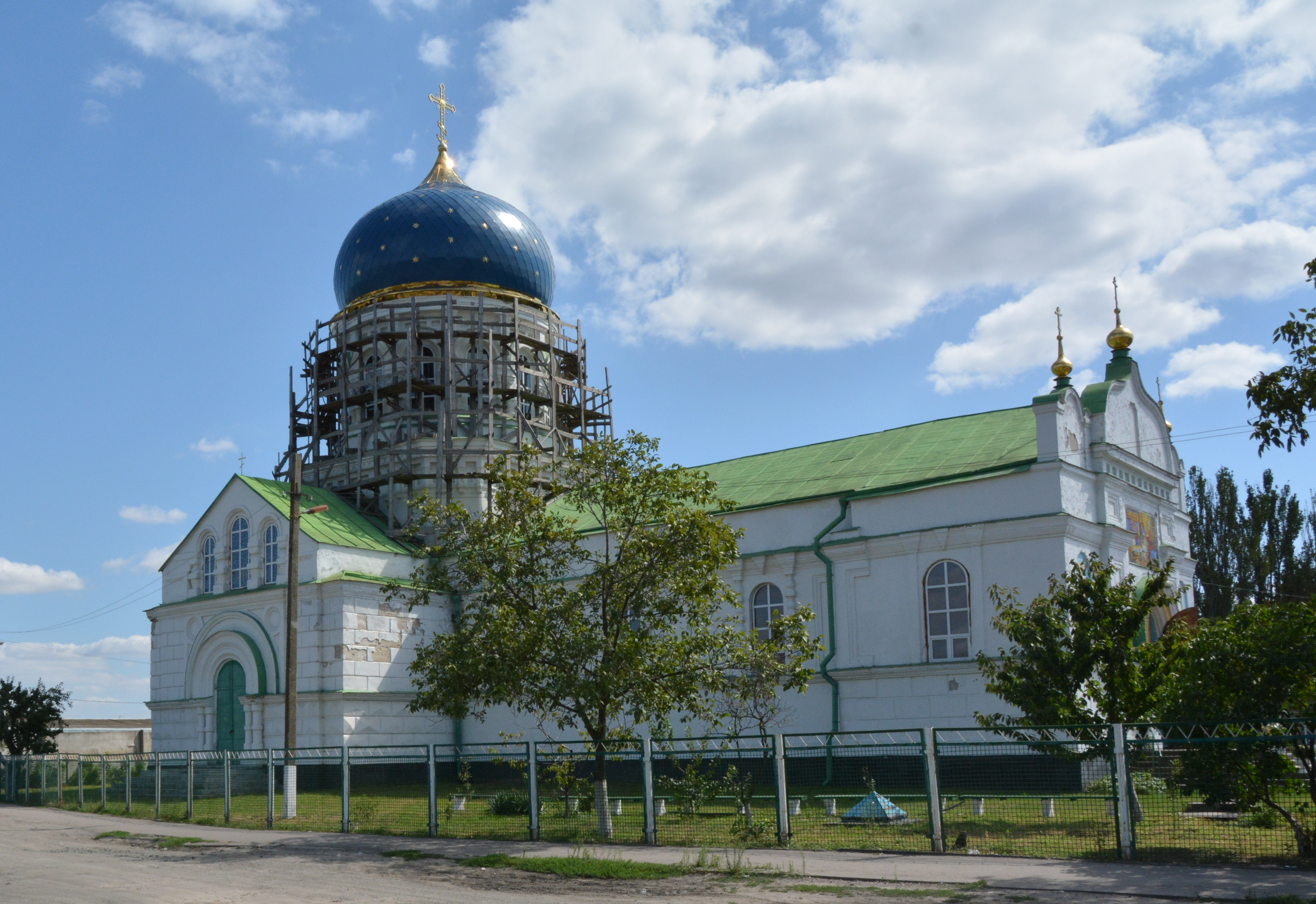
- Church of Nativity of the Theotokos

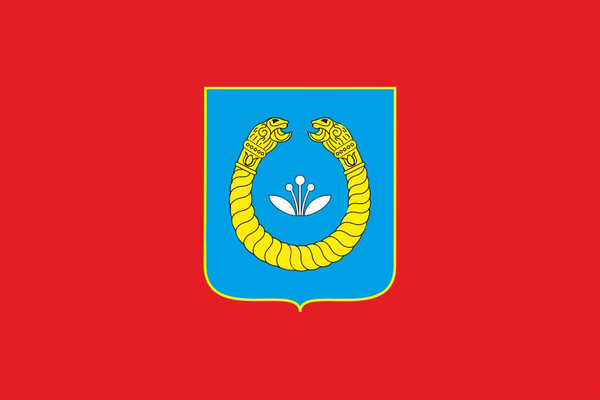
- Flag Coat of arms
- Interactive map of Kamianka-Dniprovska
- Location within Zaporizhzhia Oblast Location within Ukraine
- Coordinates: 47°27′46″N 34°24′22″E
- Country: Ukraine
- Oblast: Zaporizhzhia Oblast
- Raion: Vasylivka Raion
- Hromada: Kamianka-Dniprovska urban hromada
- Founded: 1786

Area
  - Total: 21 km^{2} (8.1 sq mi)

Population (2022)
  - Total: 12,117
- Postal code: 71300
- Area code: +380 6138
- Climate: Dfa

Kamianka-Dniprovska (Ukrainian: Кам'янка-Дніпровська [ˈkɑmjɐnkɐ d⁽ʲ⁾n⁽ʲ⁾iˈprɔu̯sʲkɐ]) is a city in Zaporizhzhia Oblast, Ukraine. It served as the administrative center of the former Kamianka-Dniprovska Raion until that raion was merged into Vasylivka Raion in 2020. Population: 12,117 (2022 estimate). In 2022, the city was occupied by Russian troops, during the Russian invasion of Ukraine.

It is located on the south bank of a west-flowing part of the Dnieper River. On the north bank is the town of Nikopol. About 15 kilometres (9.3 mi) east is the power plant at Enerhodar. The river valley was submerged as part of the Kakhovka Reservoir until 2023. The landscape of the area is flat and steppe-like.

The city is home to the Kamianka-Dniprovska District Historical and Archeological Museum.

== History ==
An archeological site near Kamianka-Dniprovska, studied by Boris Grekov between 1937 and 1953, gives evidence suggesting that the city was once the capital of the ancient Scythian Kingdom. In 1701 Russia built a fort here called Kamenny Zaton ("Stoney Backwater"). It interacted with the Cossack settlements on the north side of the river.

It received city status in 1957. In 1972 the population was 16,900 people.

In January 1989 the population was 17,906 people.

In January 2013 the population was 13,495 people.

== Demographics ==
As of the Ukrainian national census in 2001, the town had a population of 15,406 people. Kamianka-Dniprovska is the only major settlement in the entire Zaporizhzhia Oblast, in which people who have an ethnic Russian background constitute the largest share of the population. The ethnic exact composition was as follows:

Ethnic groups (2001)
	percent
Russians	49.56%
Ukrainians	47.89%
Belarusians	0.68%
Armenians	0.38%
Bulgarians	0.18%
Georgians	0.11%
Germans	0.10%
Tatars	0.10%

== Gallery ==
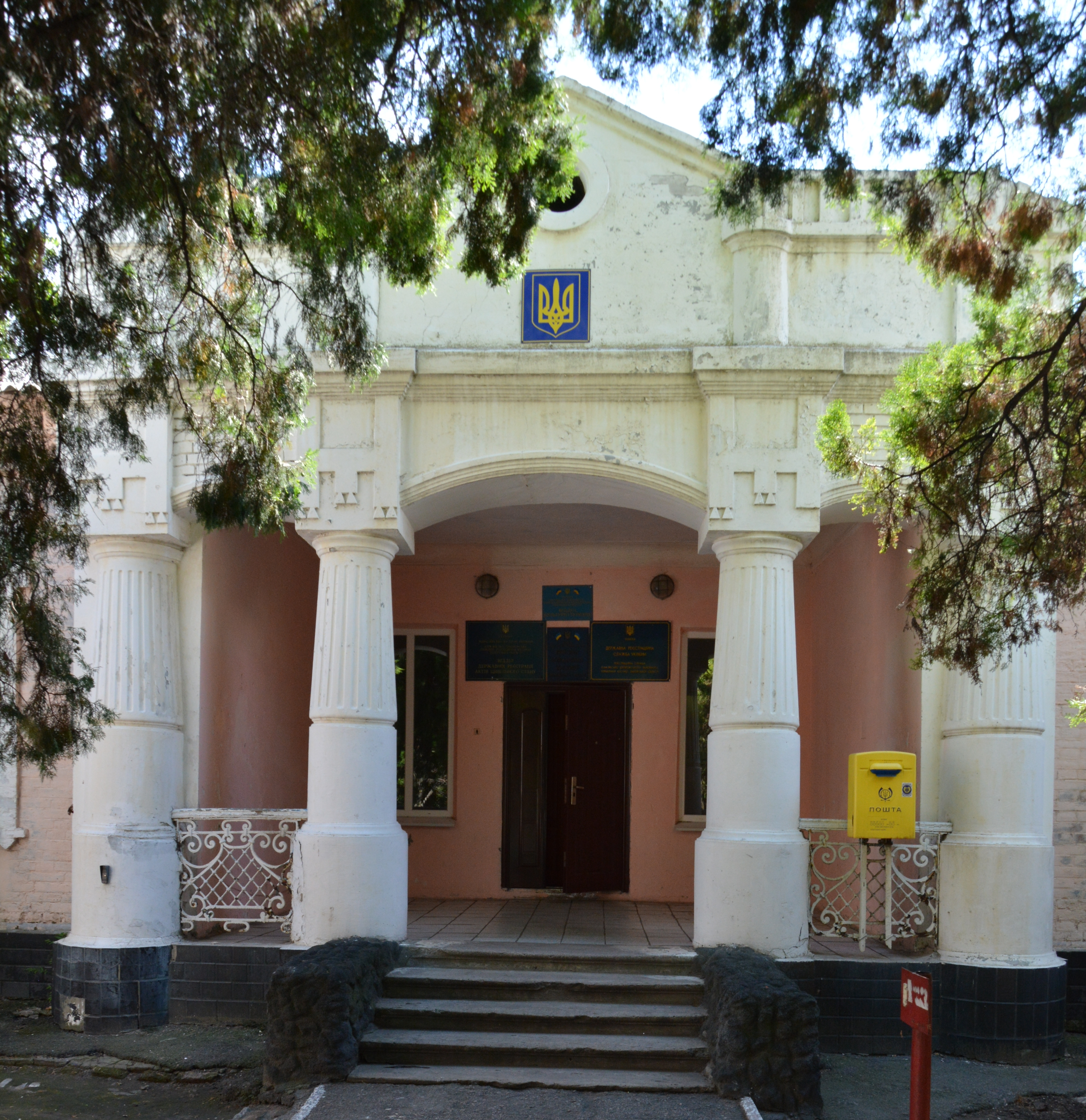
Historic residence in Kamianka-Dniprovska

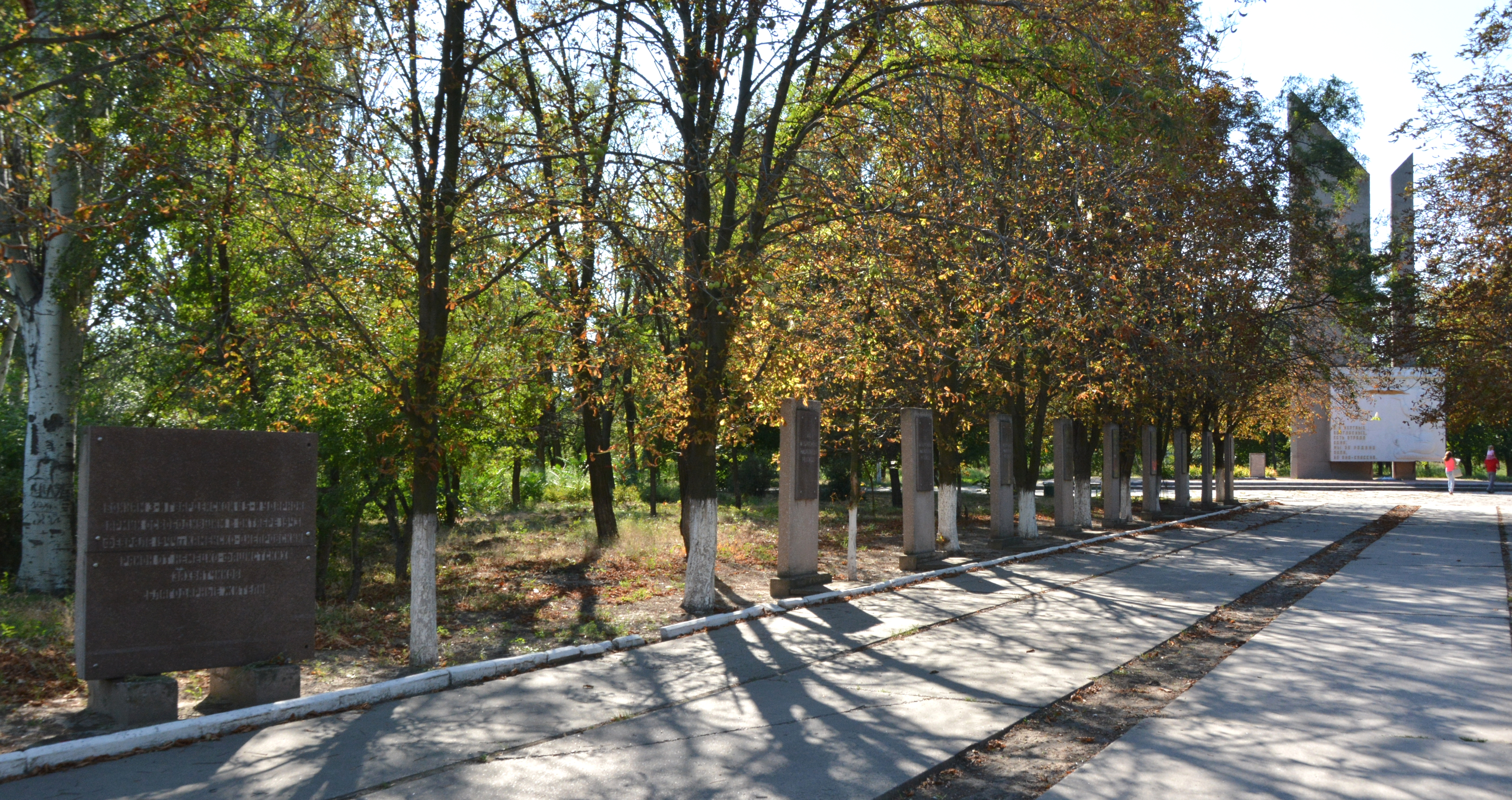
Alley of Fallen Heroes

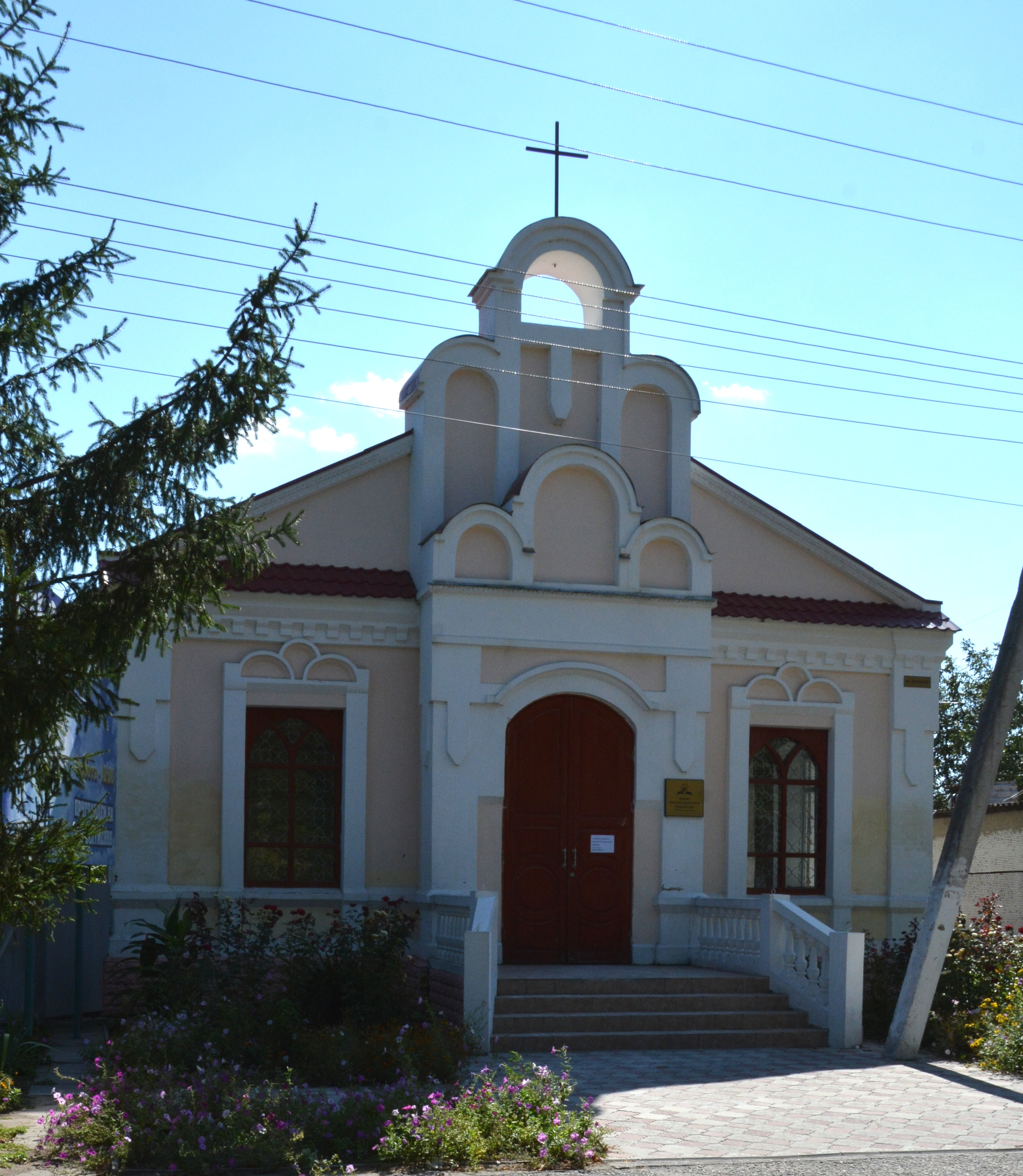
City library
