= Mamai-Hora =

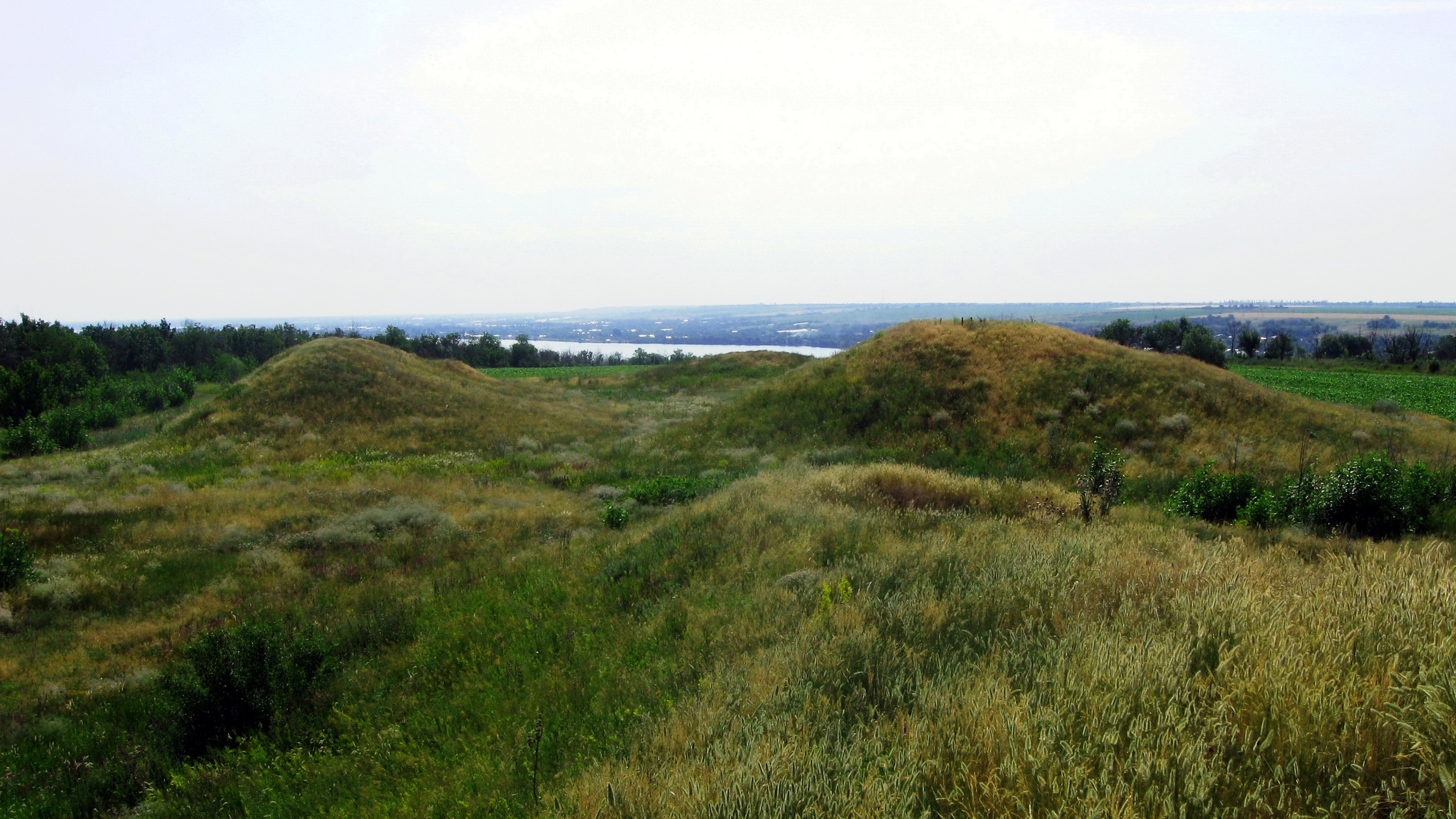
- Kurgans in Mamai-Hora
- Interactive map of Mamai-Hora

Immovable Monument of National Significance of Ukraine
- Official name: Курганний могильник "Мамай-могила" (Mamai-Mohyla kurgan grave field)
- Type: Archaeology
- Reference no.: 080009-Н

Mamai–Hora is the largest multicomplex burial mound of national importance in the Northern Black Sea region. It is located on the left bank of the Kakhovka Reservoir near the village of Velyka Znamianka in Vasylivka Raion, Zaporizhzhia Oblast.

== History of site studies ==
The plan of the burial ground was first drawn by B. N. Grakovs's expedition in 1946–1947; later in 1976 it was edited by the Institute of Archaeology of the National Academy of Sciences of Ukraine. In 1988 a study was carried out by the archaeological expedition led by G. M. Toshchev and S. I. Andrukh. The first years of excavations were focused on studying of small hillocks. In the early 90s, aerial photography and an additional topographical survey were carried out. As a result, both hundreds of separate "spots" and joined ones were documented. Also, the approximate boundaries of the burial mound were determined; its size covered some 30 ha. It is possible that the original footprint of the site was substantially larger, and reduced considerably due to the loss of more than 300 meters of shoreline after the Kakhovka Reservoir was created. Supporting this conjecture, destroyed burials near the water have been unearthed. Since the middle of the 90s, archaeological work have been done manually. In total, about 8 hectares of the site have been studied. More than 600 funeral complexes, concentrated in burial mounds and soil burial grounds or individual burials have been identified.

== Cultures ==
=== Neolithic and Eneolithic periods ===
26 Neolithic and 4 Eneolithic burials were discovered in total. The grave goods are represented by clay pottery and adornments made of red deer teeth. Inhumation was carried out both in soil burial grounds and burial mounds.

=== The Bronze Age ===
A tradition of erecting burial mounds (kurgans) became widespread in the Bronze Age. The burials of all known cultures of that age have been found in the earthen hillocks studied at Mamai-Hora, i.e. the Pit-Grave, Catacomb, Multiroller ceramics and Logs cultures. Each of them had its own specific funeral practices, burial rites and grave goods made of clay, bronze, stone, and flint. Trees were often used in burials, namely oak and ash. A vault was revealed next to one of the mounds, that was a pit with ore from which the paint was burned and a lavishly ornamented Catacomb culture vessel found.

==== The Pit-Grave culture ====
The Pit-Grave culture is represented by 14 locations, both burial mounds and burial grounds. Grave goods – decorated pottery.

==== The Catacomb culture ====
The main Catacomb culture burials are soil burials, but several of them were dug into the Eneolithic period burial mounds. In total there are 33 burials. Grave goods are sparse, represented by clay pottery and cult axes.

==== The Multiroller ceramics culture ====
There are only nine burials of the Babyno culture (Multiroller ceramics culture).

==== The Bilozerska culture ====
The Bilozerska culture soil burial ground contains 5 burials.

==== The Novocherkassk culture ====
The fault line between the Bronze Age and the early Iron Age is marked by two burials of the Novocherkassk culture.

=== The Scythians ===
The earliest Scythian burial dates to the end of the VII-VI centuries BC. The rest of the complexes come from the period of the 5th–4th centuries BC. The total number of burials from this period is 370. According to the study of E. Fialko the Amazons were buried in many of them. A large number of cult pits (amphorae fragments, molded ceramics, bones of animals) located on the periphery of the Scythian burial ground refer to this time as well. The grave goods are varied. This is pottery both locally produced and imported from the Greek centers. Weaponry is represented by differently sized swords, darts, spear points and arrowheads. Amidst adornments, there are bracelets, hryvnias, pendants, earrings, rings, plaques and beads. A Sarmatian burial was inlet into the Scythian kurgan.

=== The Polovtsians ===
Two Polovtsian soil burials have been excavated. The rest were inlet into earlier-period hillocks or formed independent complexes. 25 burials were revealed. The varied grave goods are represented by ornaments, household objects, and weapons.

=== The Golden Horde ===
A burial ground dating back to the 1st half of 14th century has been excavated. 19 nomadic burials and a cult pit of the Golden Horde period have been researched. Weapons, details of horse harnesses, belt buckles, earrings, awls, beads, and remains of headwear were found in male burials; ornaments, household objects, and remains of headwear in female burials. Beads were found in children's burials. A kurgan burial ground dating back to the mid-second half of the XIV century has also been found. In all 23 burials were revealed. The main burials were in five hillocks, while the rest were inlet into the Scythian period kurgans. Also, 700 meters to the south of Mamai-Hora burial mounds, the Mamai-Surka burial ground dating back to the end of the 13th and beginning of the 15th century was researched. 1162 of its burials were studied.

=== The Late Middle Ages ===
A new surge of active use of the site as a cemetery can be dated to the 15th century. In 2015, 126 graves forming a soil burial ground dating to this time were discovered.

== Endangered monument ==
By the time of systematic rescue work, the territory of the burial ground had been reduced by 300–400 m.
