= Vasylivka Raion =

Subdivision of Zaporizhzhia Oblast, Ukraine

Vasylivka Raion Василівський район
- Raion
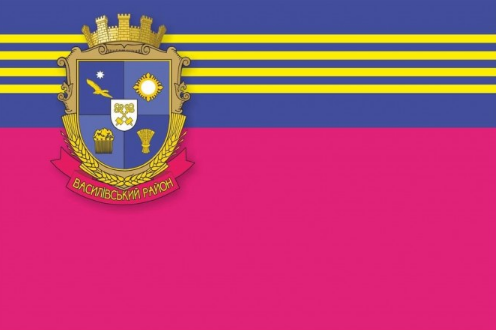
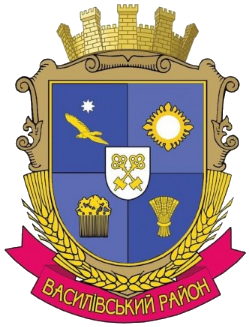
- Flag Coat of arms
- Interactive map of Vasylivka Raion
- Coordinates: 47°28′22″N 35°22′15″E
- Country: Ukraine
- Oblast: Zaporizhzhia Oblast
- Established: 1923
- Admin. center: Vasylivka
- Subdivisions: 11 hromadas

Government
  - Governor: Serhiy Hrachov

Area
  - Total: 4,287.33 km^{2} (1,655.35 sq mi)

Population (2022)
  - Total: 181,271
  - Density: 42.2806/km^{2} (109.506/sq mi)
- Time zone: UTC+02:00 (EET)
  - Summer (DST): UTC+03:00 (EEST)
- Postal index: 71600—71674
- Area code: +380 6175
- Website: vasrda.gov.ua

Vasylivka Raion (Ukrainian: Василівський район) is one of the five raions (districts) of Zaporizhzhia Oblast in southern Ukraine. The administrative center of the region is the town of Vasylivka. Population: 181,271 (2022 estimate).

On 18 July 2020, as part of the administrative reform of Ukraine, the number of raions of Zaporizhzhia Oblast was reduced to five, and the area of Vasylivka Raion was significantly expanded. The January 2020 estimate of the raion population was 60,962 (2020 est.).

== Subdivisions ==
Number of settlements 109. Number of cities ― 4 (Enerhodar, Dniprorudne, Kamianka-Dniprovska, Vasylivka). Vasylivka Raion includes 11 territorial communities. It contains territorial hromadas:

- Blahovishchenka rural hromada
- Dniprorudne urban hromada
- Enerhodar urban hromada
- Kamianka-Dniprovska urban hromada
- Mala Bilozerka rural hromada
- Mykhailivka settlement hromada
- Rozdol rural hromada
- Stepnohirsk settlement hromada
- Vasylivka urban hromada
- Velyka Bilozerka rural hromada
- Vodiane rural hromada

== Geography ==
Vasylivka Raion is located on the Dnieper Lowland. The area of the district is 4 287.3 km^{2}.

Typical landscapes for Vasylivka Raion are steppes on chernozems. There are salt marshes. Steppe vegetation, due to plowing, has been preserved mainly on the slopes of river valleys and gullies.

The Dnieper and its left tributaries flow through Vasylivka district.

The climate of the district is temperate continental with dry periods. According to the Köppen-Geiger climate classification, the climate of the Vasylivka Raion is humid continental with warm summers (Dfb).

Vasylivka Raiont includes the Belozersky iron ore district and Nikopol manganese basin.

== Notable landmarks ==
The Grand Meadow National Nature Park and Regional Landscape Park "Panay" have been created in the Vasylivka Raion.

== Transport ==
Vasylivka district is crossed by railway and road tracks towards Zaporizhia. The district is crossed by Vasylivka European route E105.

== Bibliography ==
- Національний атлас України/НАН України, Інститут географії, Державна служба геодезії, картографії та кадастру; голов. ред. Л. Г. Руденко; голова ред. кол.Б.Є. Патон. — К.: ДНВП «Картографія», 2007. — 435 с. — 5 тис.прим. — ISBN 978-966-475-067-4.
- Географічна енциклопедія України : [у 3 т.] / редкол.: О. М. Маринич (відповід. ред.) та ін. — К., 1989—1993. — 33 000 екз. — ISBN 5-88500-015-8.
