= Zaporizhzhia Oblast =

Oblast (region) of Ukraine

Zaporizhzhia Oblast Запорізька область
- Oblast (Note: Partially annexed by Russia as Zaporozhye Oblast)
- Zaporizka oblast
- Flag Coat of arms
- Nickname: Запоріжжя (Zaporizhzhia)
- Coordinates: 47°50′N 35°10′E
- Country: Ukraine
- Established: 10 January 1939
- Administrative centre: Zaporizhzhia

Government
  - Governor: Ivan Fedorov (Note: Control over Zaporizhzhia Oblast is disputed due to the 2022 Russian invasion of Ukraine. In the Russian-occupied part of the Oblast, the governor is Yevgeny Balitsky. Fedorov is the governor recognized by Ukraine.)
  - Oblast council: 84 seats
  - Chairperson: Olena Zhuk

Area
  - Total: 27,183 km^{2} (10,495 sq mi)
  - Rank: Ranked 9th

Population (2022)
  - Total: ▼1,638,462
  - Rank: Ranked 9th
  - Density: 60.2/km^{2} (156/sq mi)

GDP
  - Total: ₴ 229 billion (€5.9 billion)
  - Per capita: ₴ 138,521 (€3,600)
- Time zone: UTC+02:00 (EET)
  - Summer (DST): UTC+03:00 (EEST)
- Postal code: 69-72
- Area code: +380-61
- ISO 3166 code: UA-23
- Raions: 5
- Cities (total): 14
  - Regional cities: 5
- Urban-type settlements: 23
- Villages: 920
- HDI (2022): 0.741 high
- FIPS 10-4: UP26
- NUTS statistical regions of Ukraine: UA32
- Website: Zoda.gov.ua

Zaporizhzhia Oblast (Ukrainian: Запорізька область, romanized: Zaporizka oblast), commonly referred to as Zaporizhzhia (Запоріжжя), is an oblast (region) in south-east Ukraine. Its administrative centre is the city of Zaporizhzhia. The oblast covers an area of 27,183 square kilometres (10,495 sq mi), and has a population of 1,638,462 (2022 estimate). The oblast is an important part of Ukraine's industry and agriculture.

Most of the oblast's area, including all of the coast, has been under Russian military occupation since the 2022 Russian invasion of Ukraine, although the capital and the majority of the population have remained under Ukrainian administration. In September 2022, Russia declared it had annexed the Zaporizhzhia oblast based on the results of a disputed referendum. The referendum and subsequent annexation are not internationally recognized.

In the south, Zaporizhzhia Oblast includes roughly 150 kilometres (93 mi) of the Pryazovia region coastline, on the shore of the Sea of Azov.

== Geography ==
The area of the oblast is 27,183 km^{2}; its population (estimated as of 1 January 2013) was 1,785,243.

Zaporizhzhia Oblast is located within the regions of Zaporizhzhia (northern part) and Pryazovia (southern part).

=== Districts (Raions) ===
The oblast is divided into five rajons, list below with their populations as at 2022 (preceding the Russian invasion). Of these, Zaporizhzhia raion in the north remains under Ukrainian administration while the other four (broadly speaking) are under Russian administration.

- Berdjans'kyj raion [Berdyansk] District (Бердянський район) 176,046
- Melitopol's'kyj raion [Melitopol] District (Мелітопольський район) 276,638
- Polohivs'kyj raion [Polohy] District (Пологівський район) 163,641
- Vasylivs'kyj raion [Vasylivka] District (Василівський район) 181,271
- Zaporiz'kyj raion [Zaporizhzhia] District (Запорізький район) 840,866

=== Cities ===
Its largest cities by population are:

1. Zaporizhzhia
2. Melitopol – under Russian occupation
3. Berdiansk – under Russian occupation
4. Enerhodar (location of the Zaporizhzhia Nuclear Power Plant) – under Russian occupation
5. Tokmak – under Russian occupation
6. Polohy – under Russian occupation
7. Dniprorudne – under Russian occupation
8. Vilniansk
9. Orikhiv
10. Huliaipole – under Russian occupation
11. Vasylivka – under Russian occupation

=== Relief ===
Zaporizhzhia Oblast is characterized by a flat landscape. Soils are mostly chernozem. Knowledge of the relief of the Zaporizhzhia Oblast today is especially important because of the problem of land reclamation and its more intensive use.

The territory of Zaporizhzhia Oblast as a whole has a flat topography, but there are markedly elevated and depressed areas, which differ in shape, origin, and age.

The highest central-eastern part of the oblast is the Azov Upland. It extends to the east and to the territory of Donetsk Oblast, where it meets the Donetsk ridge. In the south, between the Azov Upland and the Sea of Azov, is the western part of the Azov coastal plain, which flows into the Black Sea west of the Molochna River. The northeastern end of the coastal plain merges with the Zaporizhzhia inner plain, which borders the southeastern outskirts of the Dnieper Upland. Thus, the territory of Zaporizhzhia Oblast consists of two distinct geomorphological parts: the outskirts of the Azov and Dnipro uplands, which structurally correspond to the southeastern part of the Ukrainian crystalline massif and the outskirts of the coastal Pryazov and Black Sea plains, which are located within the Black Sea basin.

== History ==
In antiquity, an area which roughly corresponds to the modern Zaporizhzhia Oblast was called the land of Gerrhos, according to Herodotus. This area was the burial place of the kings of the "Royal Scythians".

Historically, at various times, the territory was ruled either entirely or partly by Scythia, Old Great Bulgaria, Khazars, the Mongol Empire, Lithuania, the Crimean Khanate, Poland, and Russia. Khortytsia, a former fortress of the Zaporozhian Cossacks, is located in the oblast. In 1917–1920 the territory passed subsequently between the Bolsheviks, Ukrainians, White Russians, Makhnovists, the Bolsheviks once again, White Russians once again, and eventually fell to the Bolsheviks in late 1920.

The modern Zaporizhzhia Oblast was created as part of the Ukrainian Soviet Socialist Republic on 10 January 1939 out of the Dnipropetrovsk Oblast.

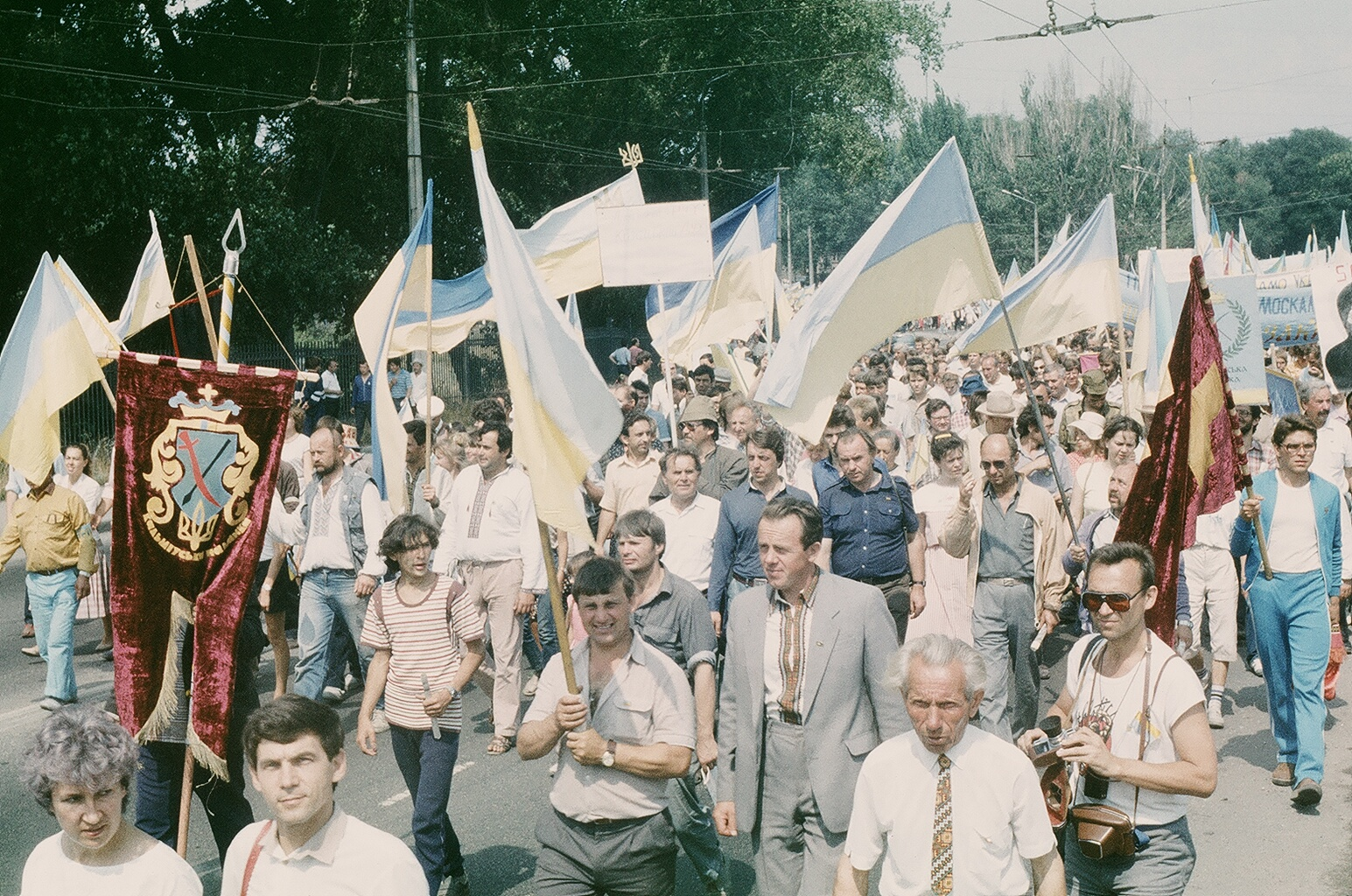
Zaporizhzhia, Soviet Ukraine, 1990

During the 1991 Ukrainian independence referendum, 90.66% of votes in the oblast were in favor of the Declaration of Independence of Ukraine.

=== Russian invasion ===
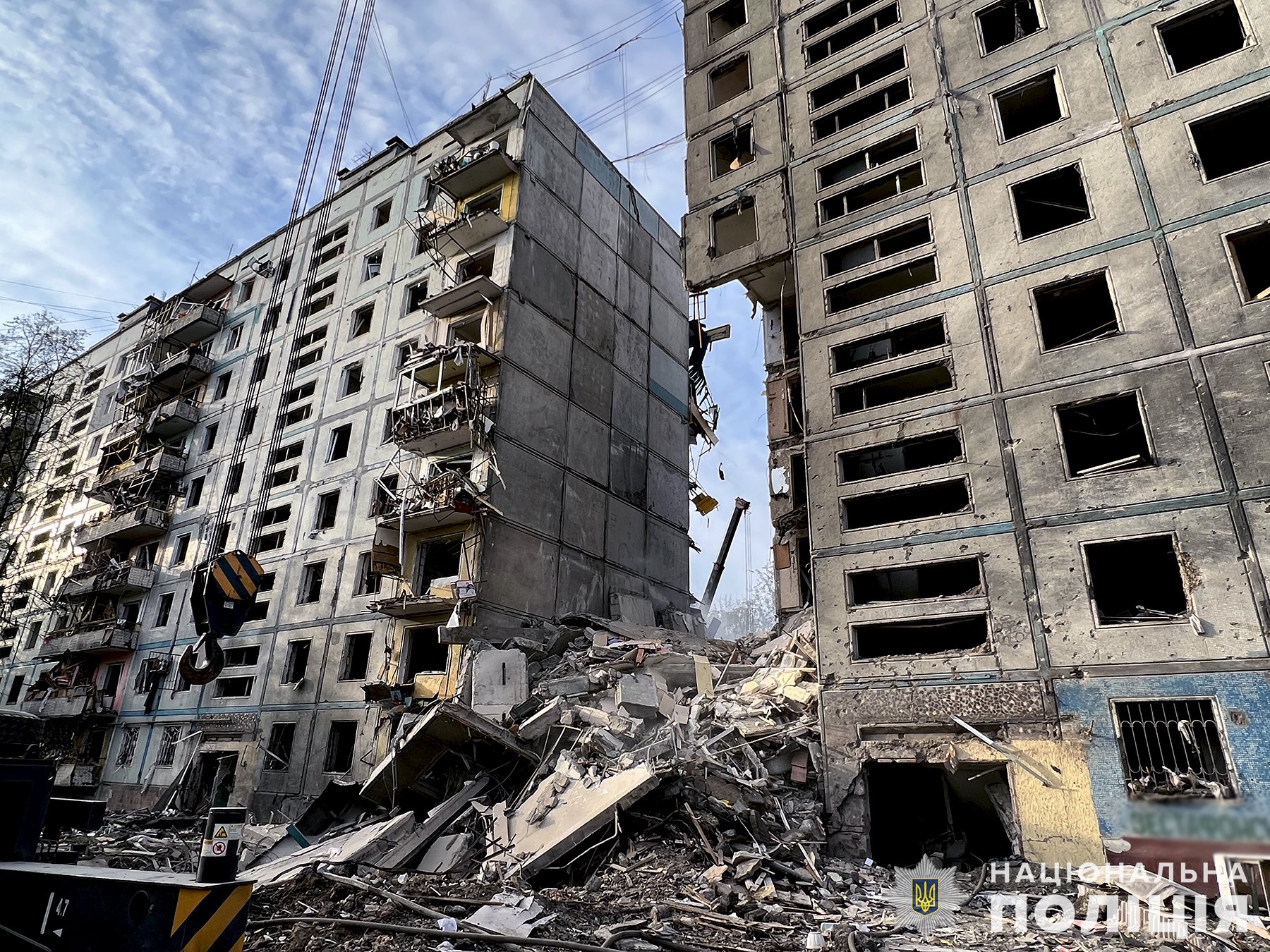
Damage to a residential building in Ukrainian-controlled Zaporizhzhia following the airstrike of 9 October 2022

During the 2022 Russian invasion of Ukraine, the Russian armed forces occupied the southern part of the oblast, defeating the Ukrainian armed forces at Melitopol and at Enerhodar. The northern parts of the oblast, including its capital city, Zaporizhzhia, remained under Ukrainian control.

On 23–27 September 2022, the Russian Federation held a referendum in the occupied portions of Zaporizhzhia oblast for "independence and subsequent entry into the Russian Federation". These referendums are recognized by most states to be staged and against international law. On 29 September 2022, the Russian Federation recognized Zaporizhzhia Oblast as an independent state. On 30 September, Russian president Vladimir Putin announced the annexation of the Zaporizhzhia Oblast and signed an "accession decree" which is widely considered to be illegal. At that time, Russia was only in control of about 70% of the province's land area as a whole, with under 50% of its population. The United Nations General Assembly subsequently passed a resolution calling on countries not to recognise what it described as an "attempted illegal annexation" and demanded that Russia "immediately, completely and unconditionally withdraw".

== Points of interest ==
The following sites were nominated for the Seven Wonders of Ukraine.

- Kamyana Mohyla, prehistoric "Stone Tomb" site (museum-preserve)
- Khortytsia, island in the River Dnieper
- Dnieper Hydroelectric Station

== Subdivisions ==
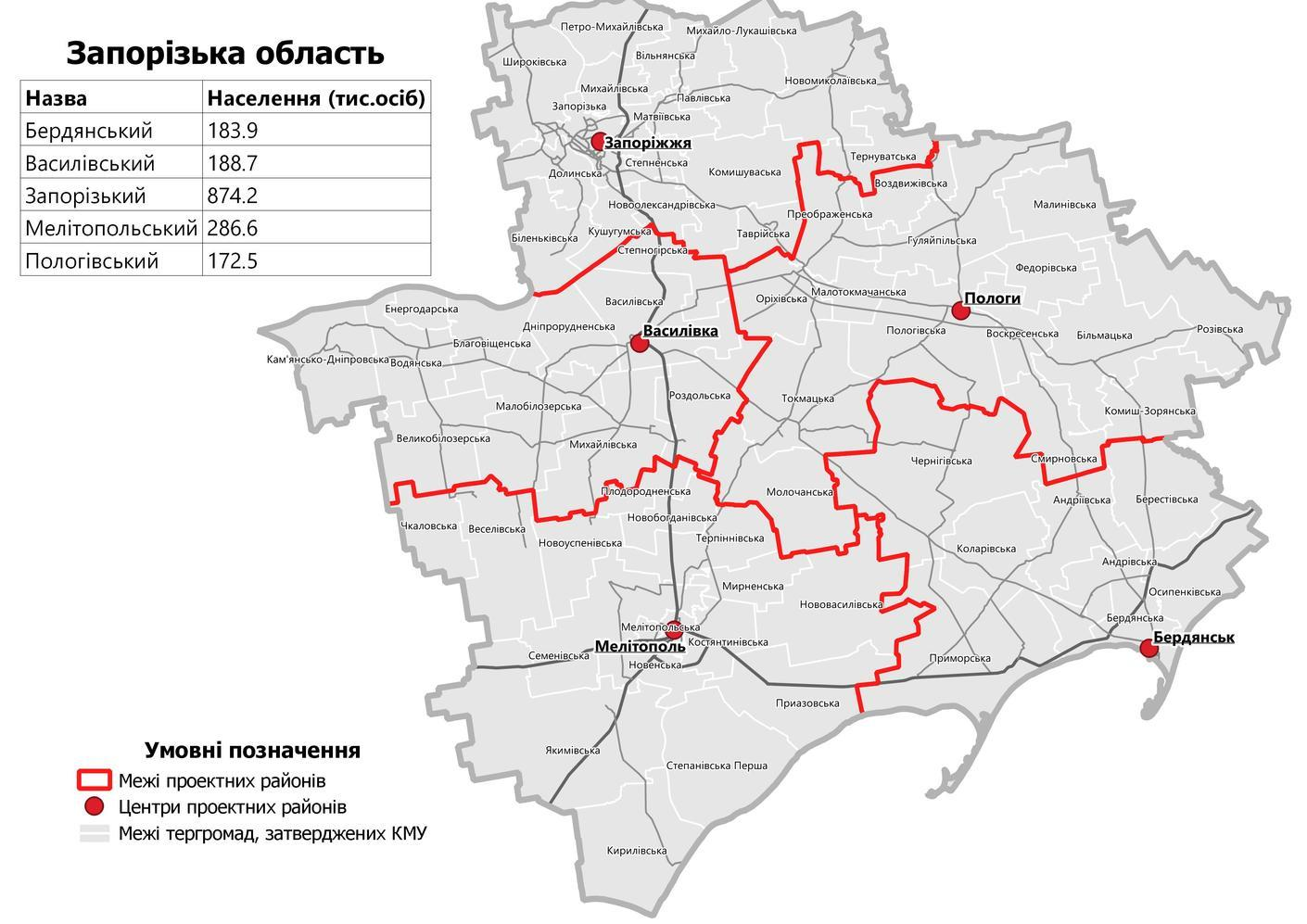
Map of raions of Zaporizhzhia Oblast

Following the reforms of 2020, the oblast is divided into five new raions, which is reduced from 25. The system of municipalities (cities of regional significance) that were directly subordinate to the oblast government was discontinued. All populated places were subordinated to raion (district) government.

Name	Ukrainian name	Area (km^{2})	Population census 2001	Population estimate 2021	Admin. center
Berdiansk Raion	Бердянський район	4,456	214,062	179,118	Berdiansk
Melitopol Raion	Мелітопольський район	6,962	318,353	280,816	Melitopol
Polohy Raion	Пологівський район	6,767	216,933	167,060	Polohy
Vasylivka Raion	Василівський район	4,295	217,018	184,224	Vasylivka
Zaporizhzhia Raion	Запорізький район	4,693	962,805	855,297	Zaporizhzhia

=== Russian occupation ===

Since February–March 2022, the armed forces of the Russian Federation have controlled the majority of the Zaporizhia Oblast. The city of Melitopol serves as a temporary administration center for the occupied territories. The front lines of the war pass through Vasylivka and Polohy raions, just north of both cities of Vasylivka and Polohy.

== Demographics ==
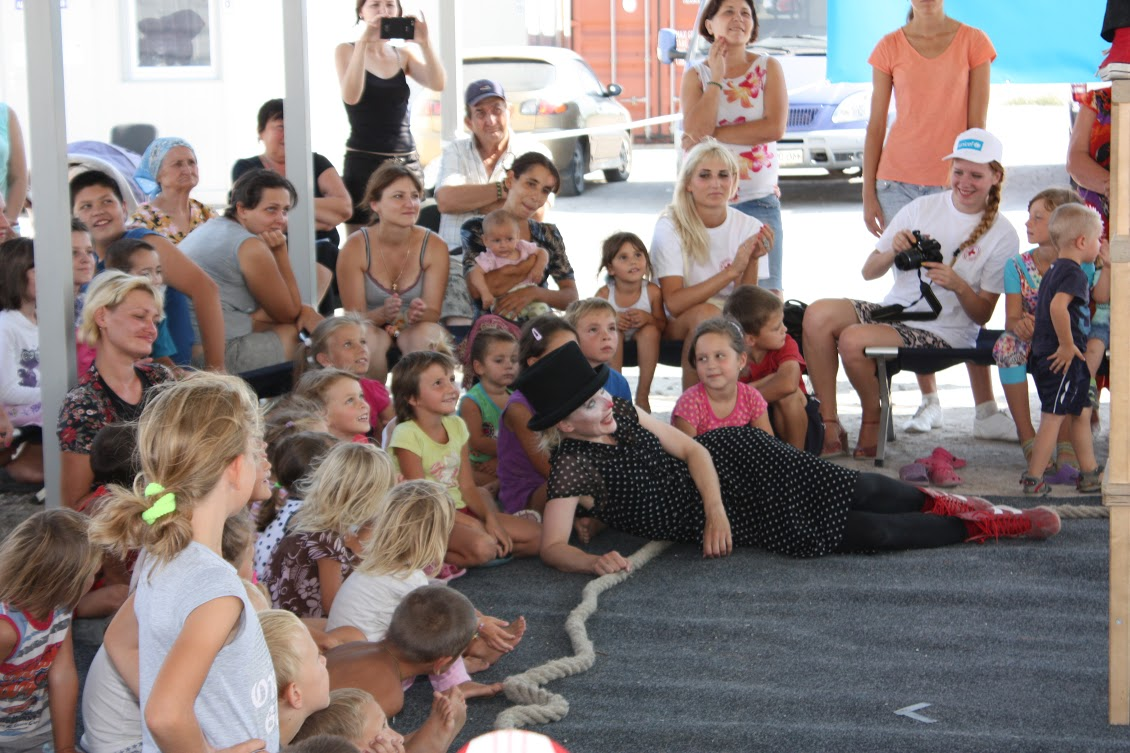
People in Zaporizhzhia in 2015

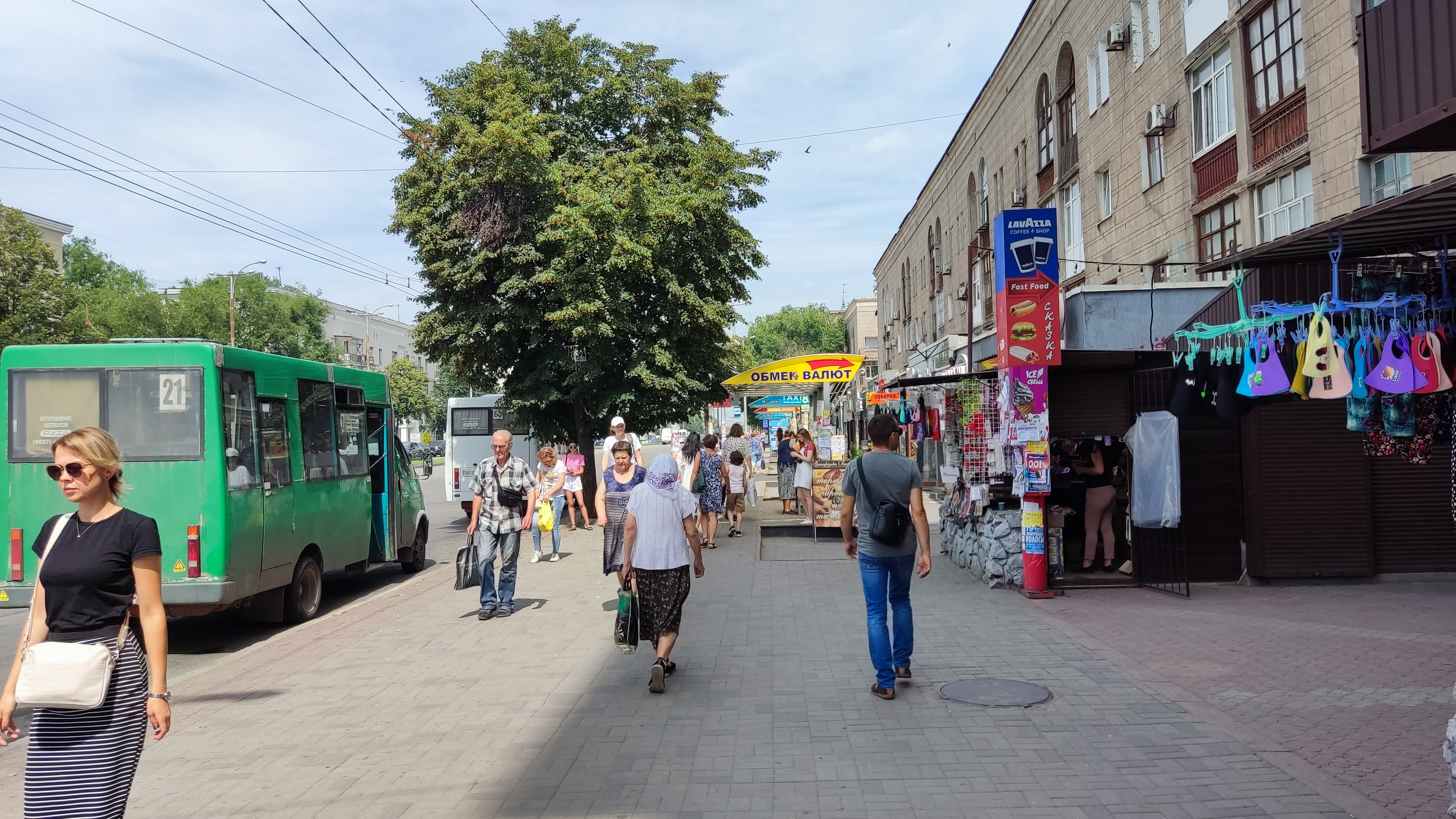
Zaporizhzhia in 2021

According to the 2001 Ukrainian Census, the population of the oblast was 1,929,171. Some 70.8% considered themselves Ukrainians, while 24.7% were Russians. The remainder were Bulgarians (1.4%), Belarusians (0.7%), and others (1.6%). Almost half the population (48.2%) considered the Russian language to be their native language.

Historical population
Year	Pop.	±%
1970	1,774,749	—
1979	1,946,352	+9.7%
1989	2,081,778	+7.0%
2001	1,929,171	−7.3%
2011	1,801,315	−6.6%
2022	1,638,462	−9.0%

=== Age structure ===
0–14 years: 13.5% ▲ (male 124,285/female 116,613)
15–64 years: 70.7% ▼ (male 598,849/female 662,838)
65 years and over: 15.8% (male 91,051/female 190,818) (2013 official)

=== Median age ===
total: 41.2 years ▲
male: 37.5 years ▲
female: 44.8 years ▲ (2013 official)

=== Fertility ===
Year	Fertility	Births	Year	Fertility	Births	Year	Fertility	Births
1990	1,7	25 960	2000	1,0	13 900	2010	1,3	18 018
1991	1,7	24 739	2001	1,0	14 010	2011	1,4	18 198
1992	1,5	22 624	2002	1,1	14 865			
1993	1,4	20 881	2003	1,1	15 301			
1994	1,3	19 265	2004	1,1	16 091			
1995	1,2	17 820	2005	1,2	15 862			
1996	1,2	16 764	2006	1,2	17 241			
1997	1,1	16 234	2007	1,3	17 591			
1998	1,1	14 968	2008	1,4	18 901			
1999	1,0	13 880	2009	1,4	18 409			

== Education ==
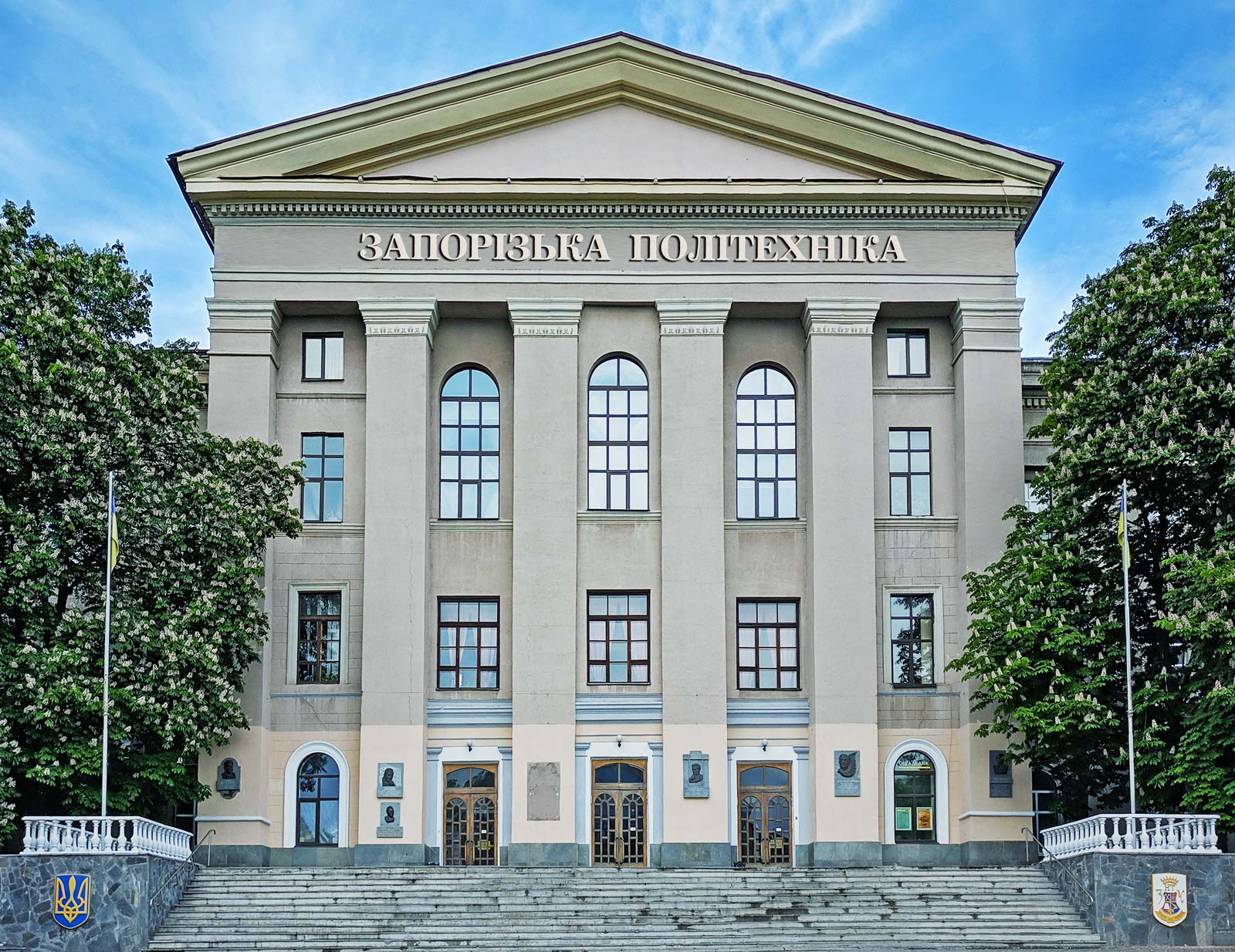
Zaporizhzhia Polytechnic National University

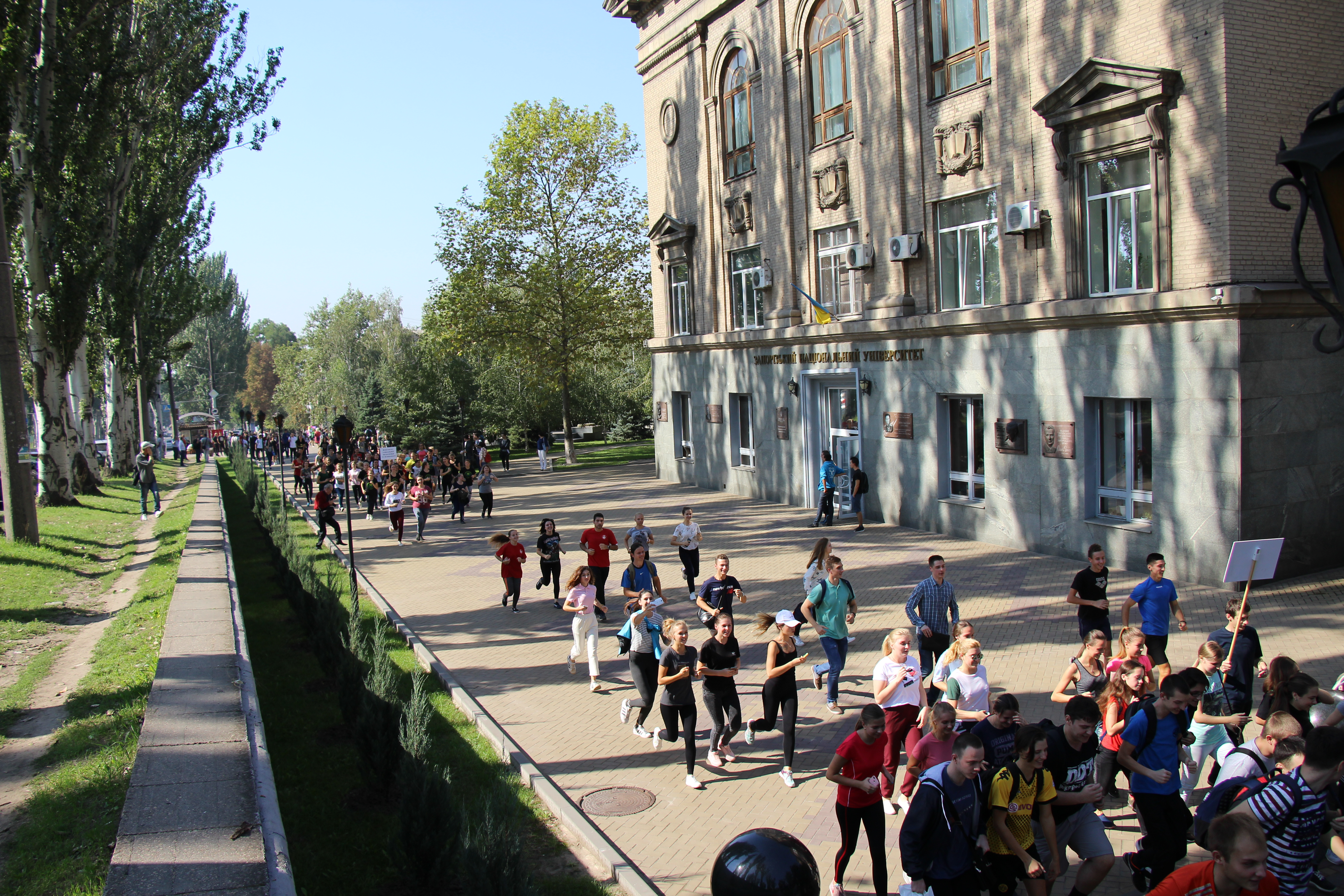
Building of the Zaporizhzhia National University

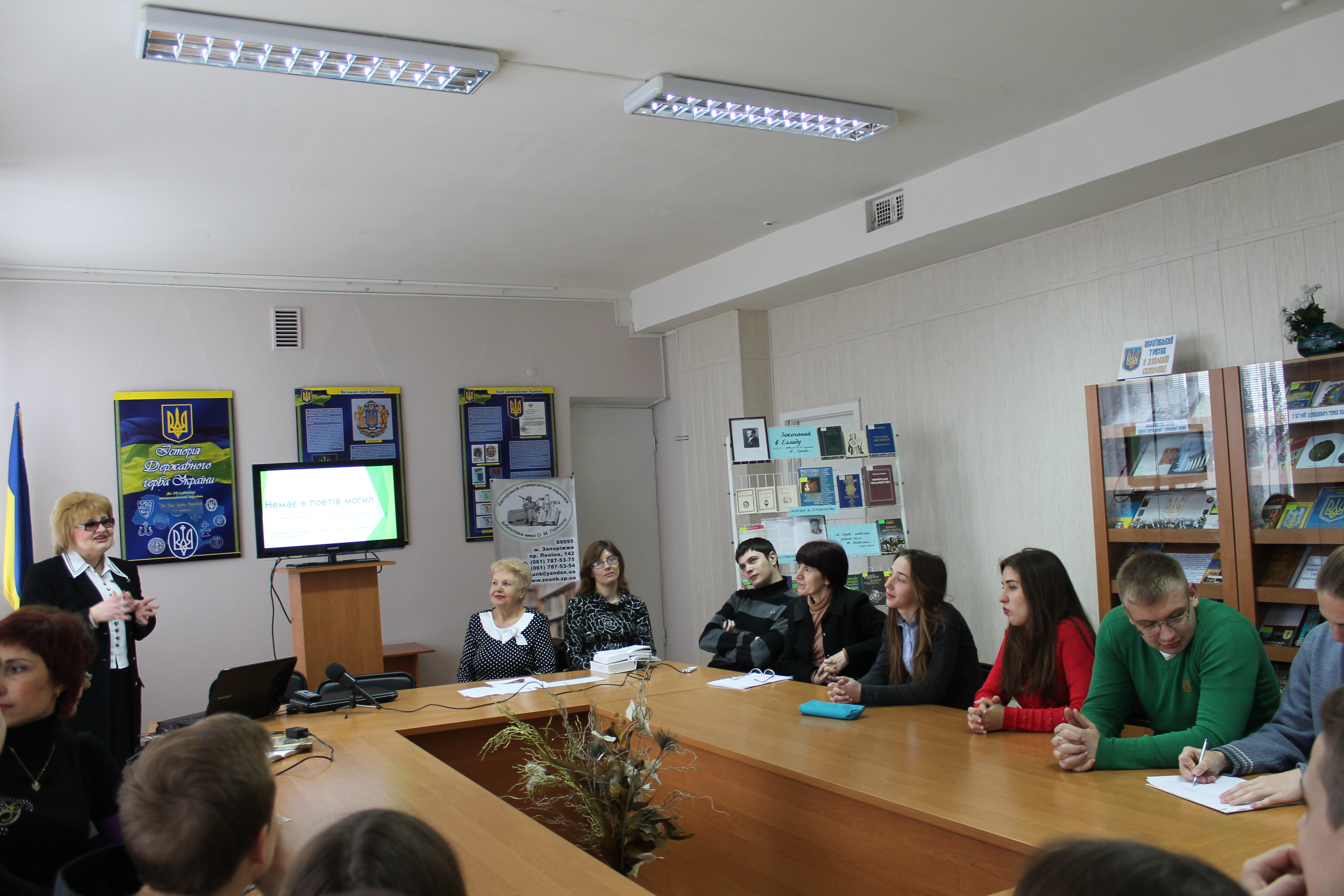
Zaporizhzhia Regional Universal Scientific Library

679 daytime and 11 evening state schools plus 6 daytime schools that are non-budget supported secondary schools involved 271,400 pupils in 2001. 22 classical schools, 8 lyceums, a Sichovy collegium and 54 education-breeding complex bodies aren't out of reach to gifted children. New style 38 complex kindergarten-schools work too.

Over 60,000 children develop their talents through out-of-school institutions. They attend 30 creative centres, 6 science-technical stations and four young naturalists' stations, five tourist clubs, three training flotillas, 11 children's sports clubs and 20 sports schools. The extra-scholastic education system has such a unique body as the Small Academy of Science. Boys and girls work there in six main disciplines: physics-mathematics, chemistry-biology, history-geography, philology, industrial and information technologies. The Small Academy young members maintain close friendly relations with scientists of big institutes and universities. 26 youngsters became winners of the All-Ukrainian Academy contest, so the Zaporizhzhia oblast team gained the 1st place.

325 secondary schools, five classical schools, a collegium, and three comprehensive schools use the Ukrainian language. Nevertheless, the minorities have a free choice—193 schools are Russian, a large Jewish school «Alef» works in Zaporizhzhia and smaller ones exist in other points, a Ukrainian-Bulgarian Lyceum is in Primorsky district. The Greek, Czech, Bulgarian languages are very popular in Yakimivsky, Berdyansky, Priazovsky and Melitopole rural districts. One may learn Hebrew, Yiddish, German, Polish, Tatar and other languages attending option courses anywhere.

Specialists keep on looking for an adaptive school model. 26 institutions develop the humanization process using new teaching technologies. The Khortitsky multi-profile teaching-rehabilitation centre has worked out methods for complete support of sanatorium-boarding-schools' children. Berdiansk is the town where a regional boarding school for orphans works out active socialization programs.

42 institutions provide vocational education. This system distributes well-trained workers to regional industries and businesses. The list of specialties includes over 100 names. Vocational schools give courses for improving qualifications in cooperation with unemployment centres. More than 1,500 jobless persons get new professions every year due to it.

The higher education system is the most flexible and advanced. Today, 25 state-controlled technical colleges have I–II class rank and 8 higher institutions have III–IV class certificates. These are the university and the Zaporizhzhia Politechnic, the Medical University and the Institute of Law with Ministry of Internal Affairs in Zaporizhzhia City, the Pedagogical University, the Agricultural Academy in Melitopol and the Pedagogical Institute in Berdiansk. There are also five higher-education private bodies—the Institute of Economics and Information Technologies, the State and Municipal Government Institute and the others. Over 65,000 people are students in this oblast. There are 212 Doctors of Science and 1,420 Candidates of Science among their lecturers. The city of Zaporizhzhia is one of the biggest centres for foreigners' education in Ukraine.

The International Astronomical Union named two minor planets 5936 Khadzhinov and 19082 Vikchernov in honor of Ukrainians from Zaporizhizhia Oblast who made a significant contribution in science and education.

== Economics ==
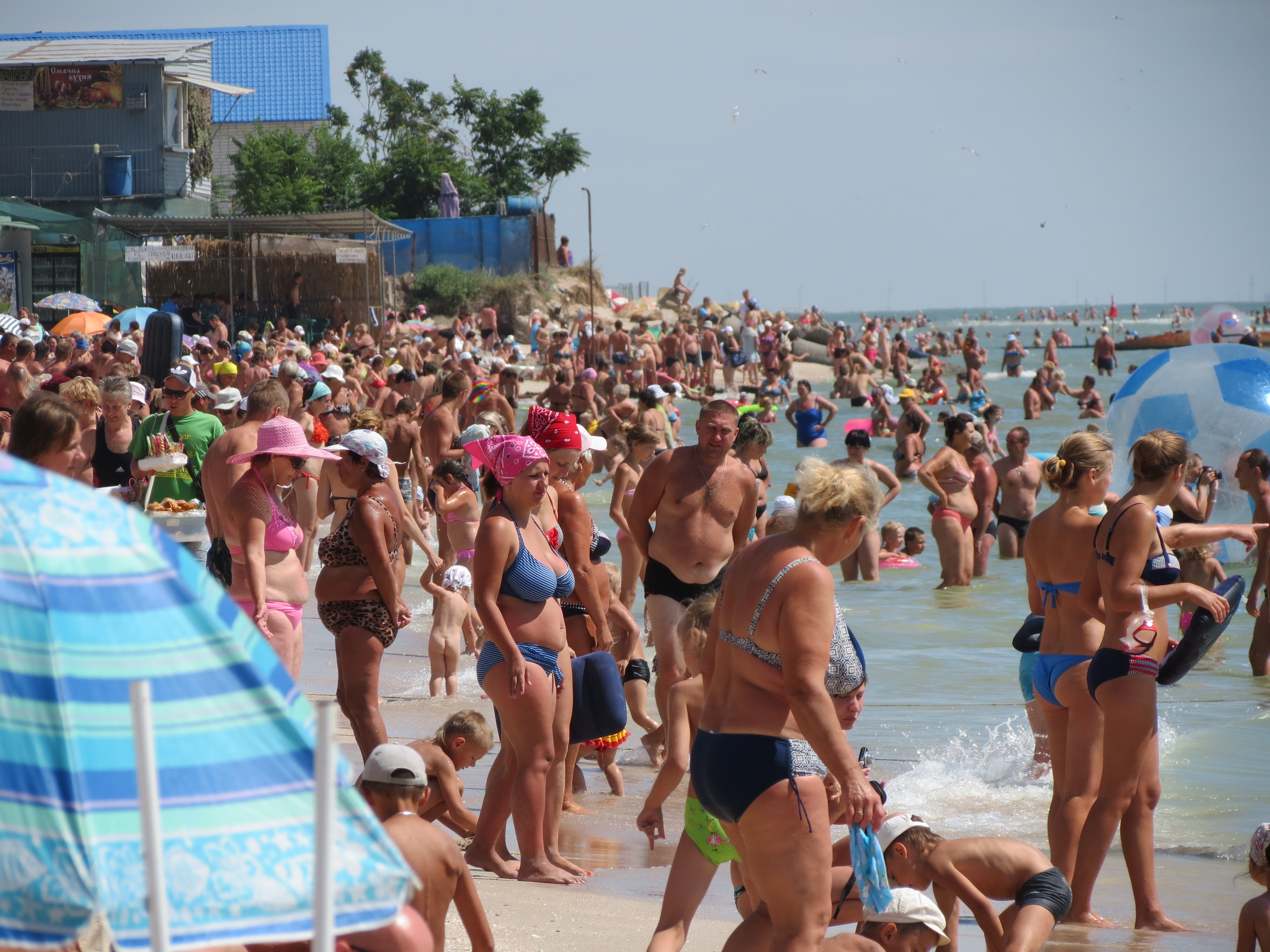
Before the Russian invasion, Kyrylivka was a resort town on the Black Sea coast.

=== Gross regional product ===
The volume of the gross regional product (GRP) of the oblast in 2016 amounted to ₴104,323 million (9th place among the regions). The total contribution of the oblast to the GRP of Ukraine was 4.4%.

The index of the physical volume of gross regional product in the previous year's prices was 99.7%.

The amount of gross value added (GVA) in 2016 amounted to ₴82,054 million (9th place among the oblasts).

The total contribution of the oblast to the GVA of Ukraine amounted to 4.1% in 2016.

The index of physical volume of gross value added in previous year's prices was 99.8%.

The main types of economic activity that form the GVA of the oblast are:

- Industry (including the supply of electricity, gas, steam, and air conditioning): 41%
- Agriculture, forestry, and fisheries: 13.9%
- Wholesale and retail trade: 10.4%
- Real estate transactions: 6%

== Gallery ==
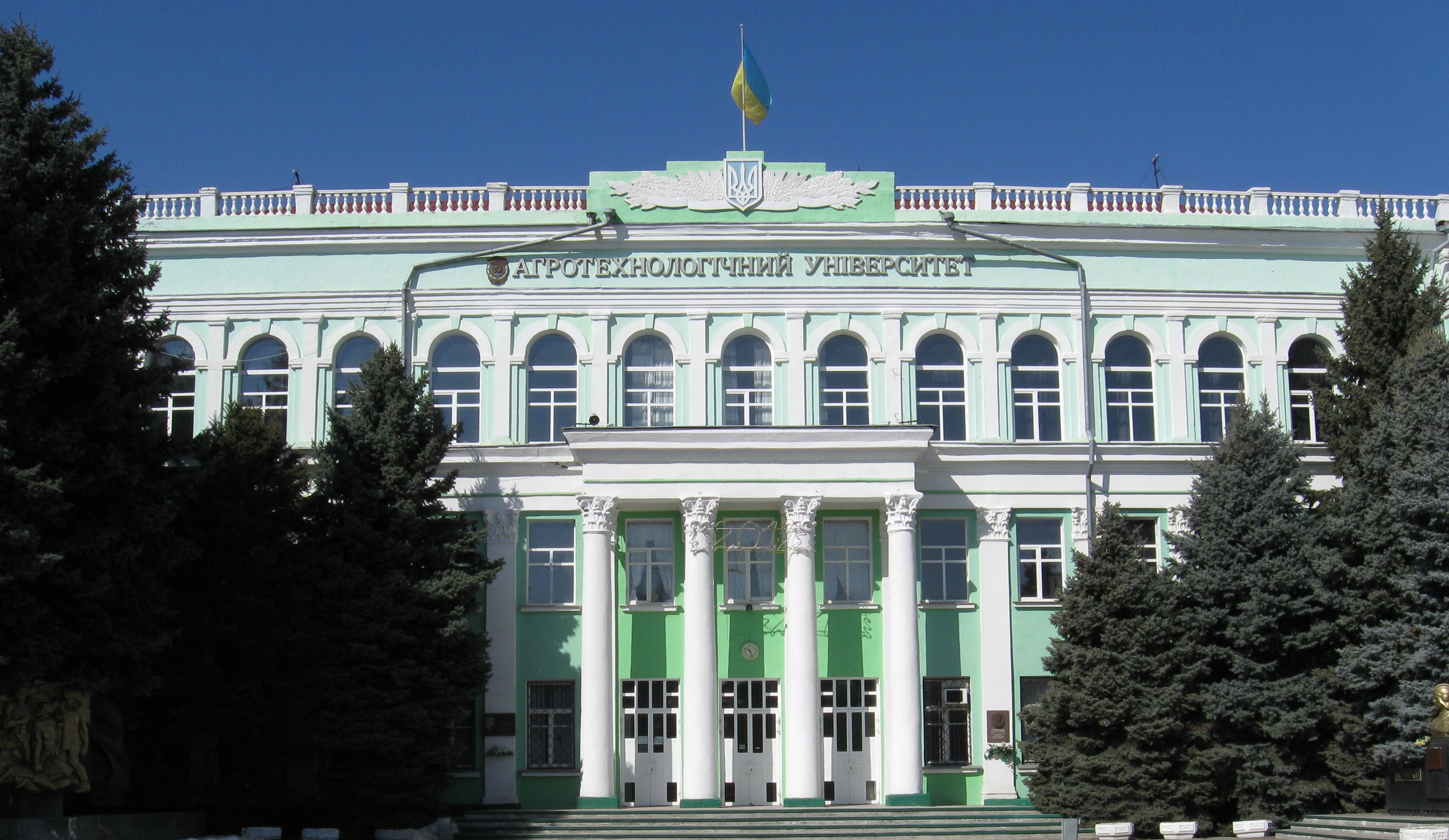
Tavrian State Agrotechnological University in Melitopol

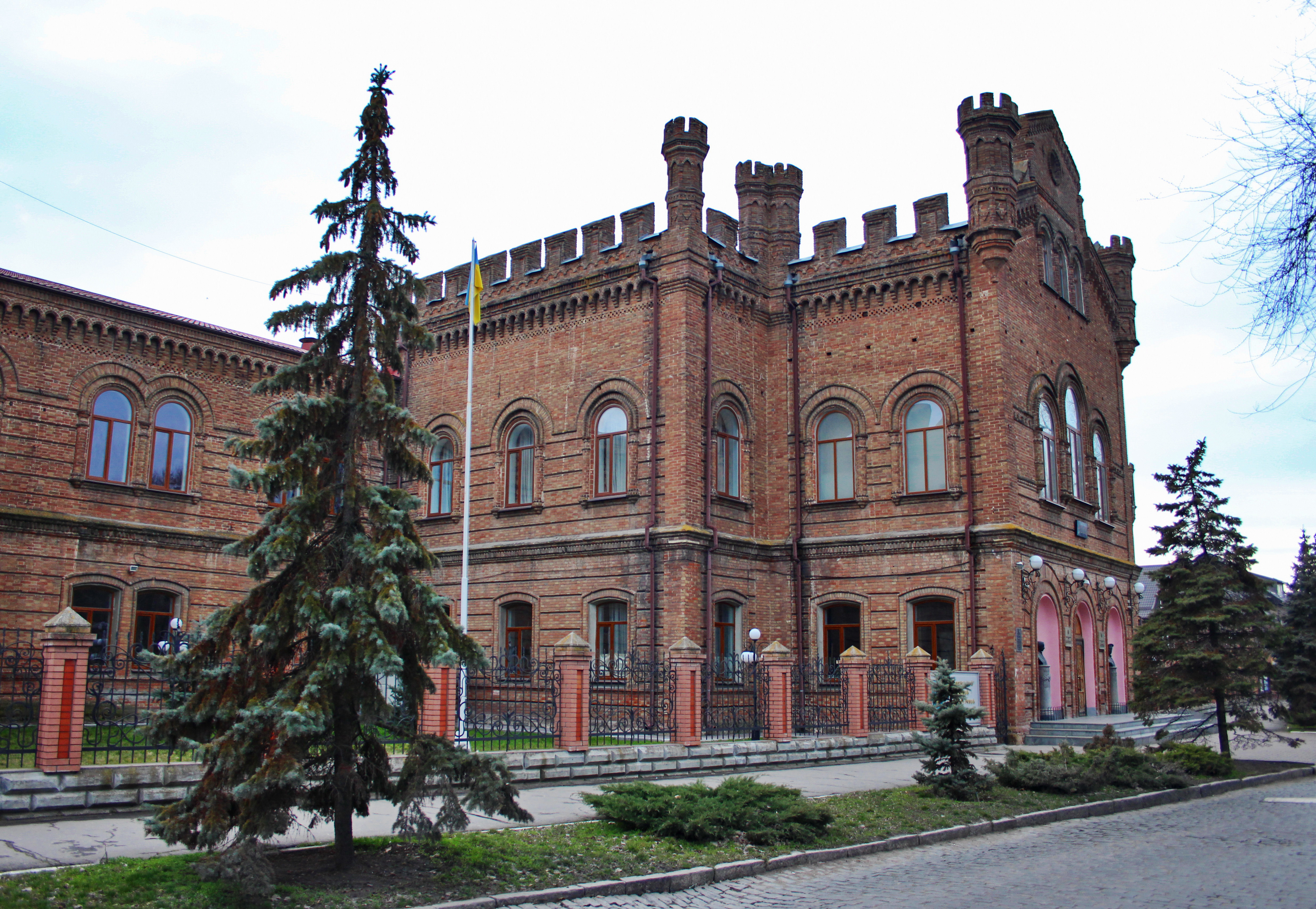
Berdiansk State Pedagogical University in Berdiansk

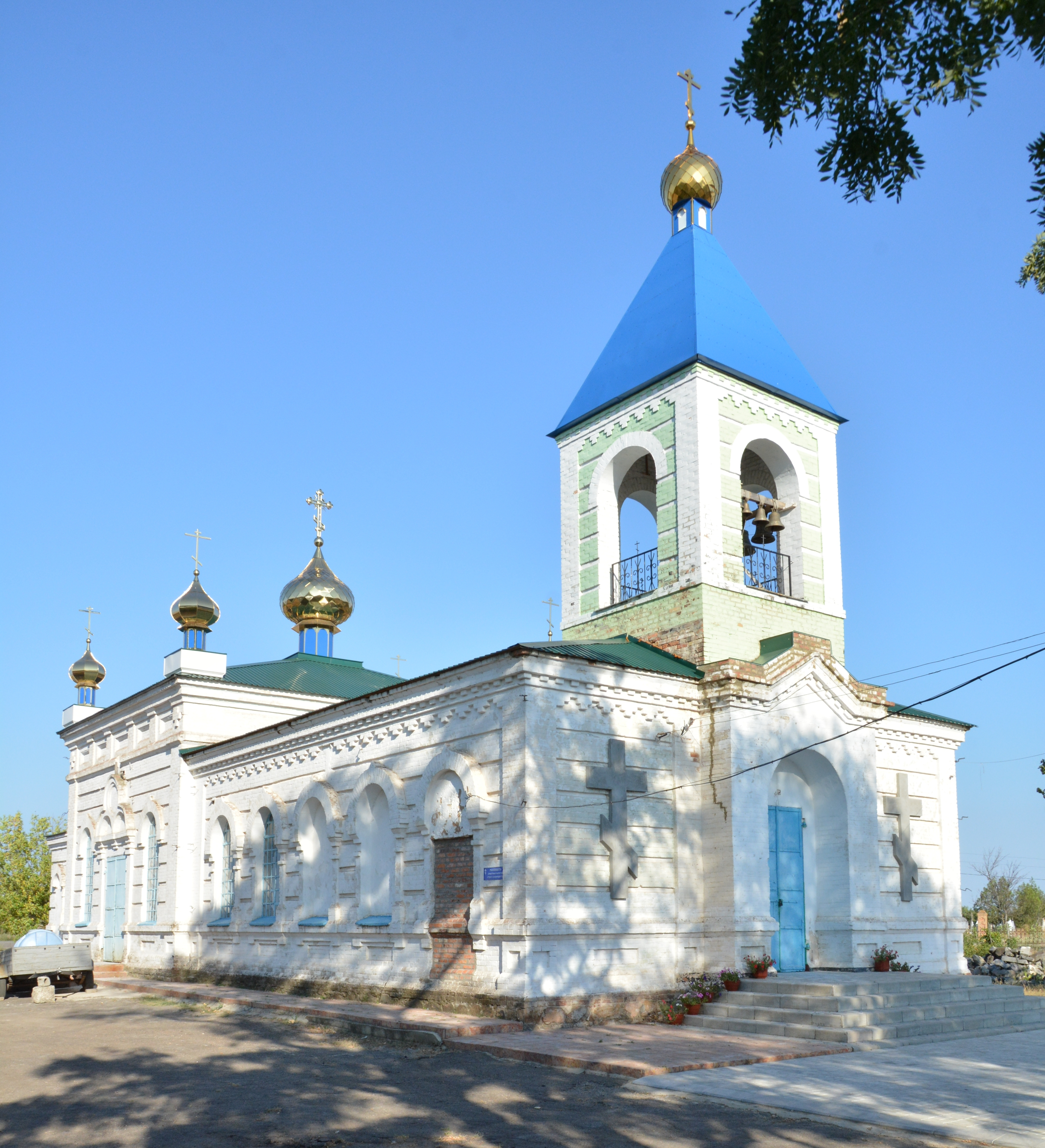
Saint Sergius Church in Tokmak

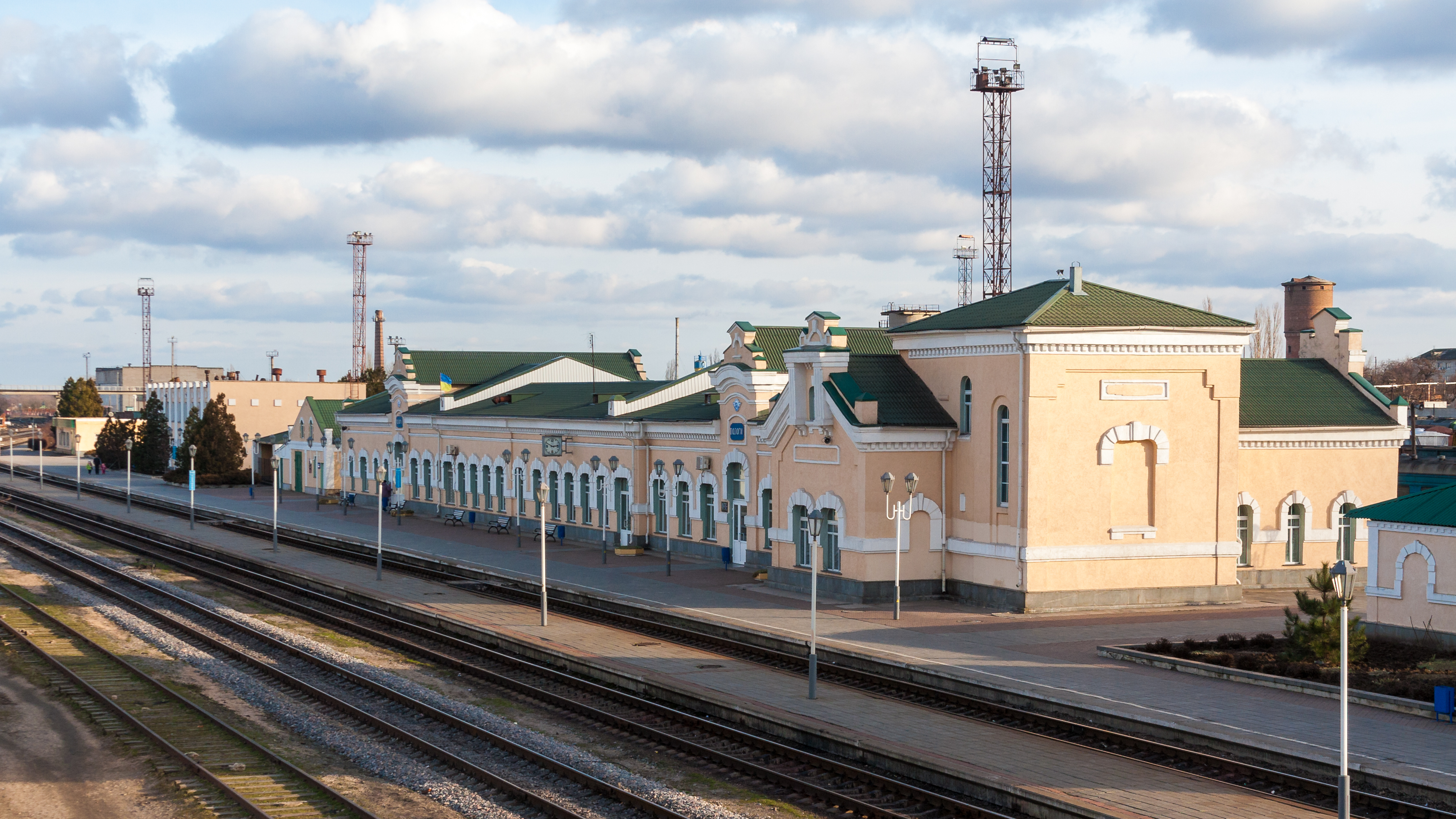
Railway station in Polohy

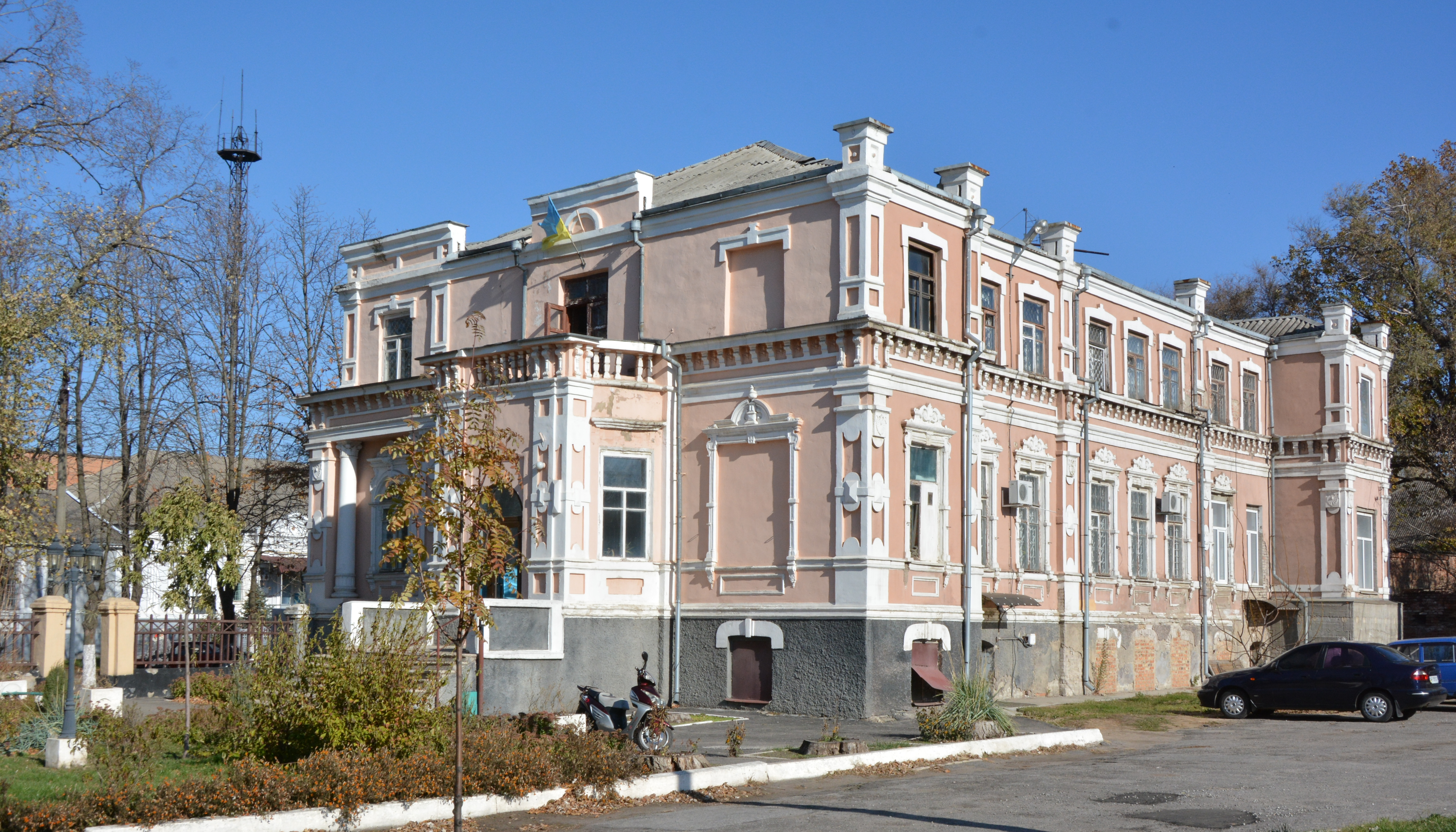
Old mansion in Orikhiv

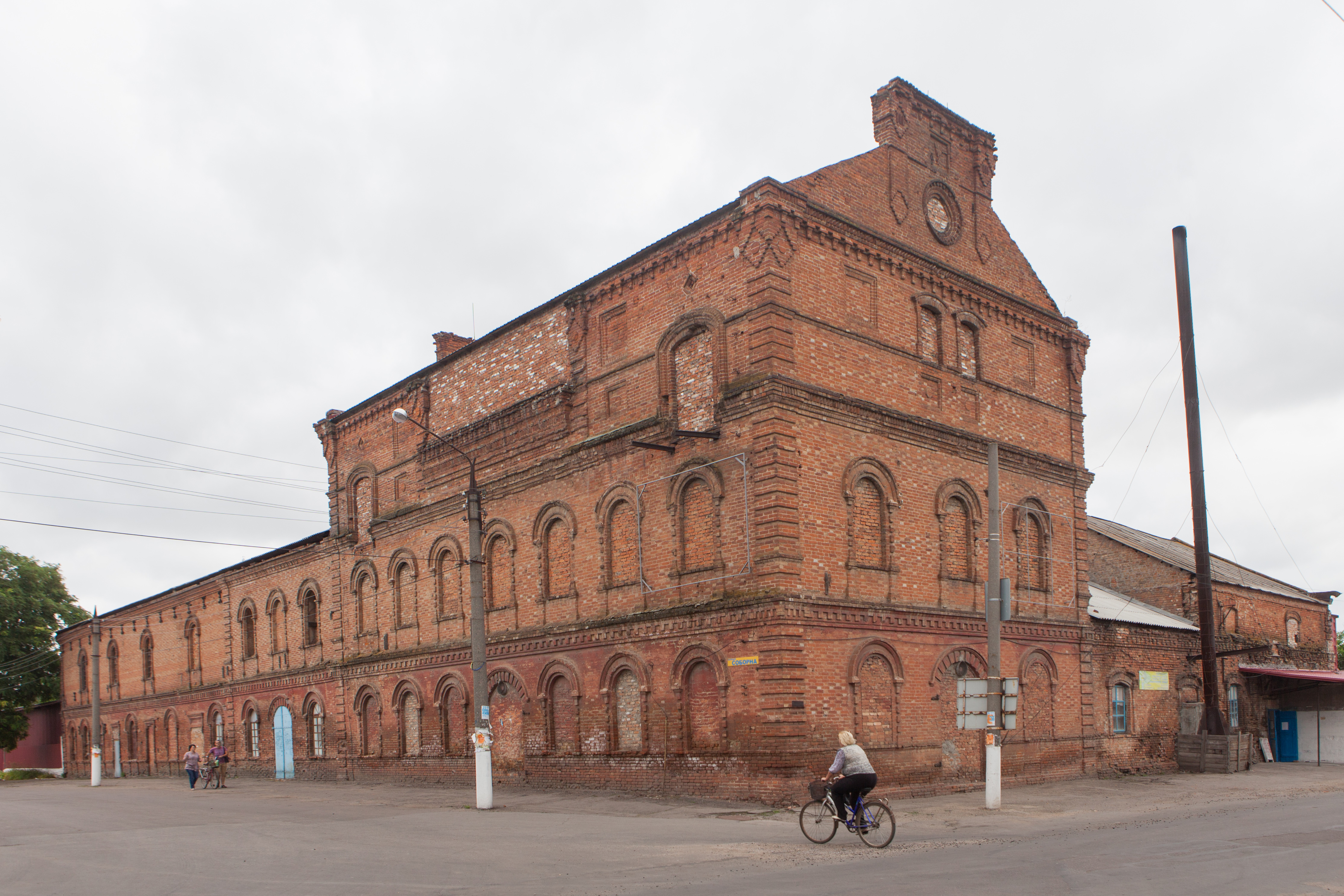
Old mill in Huliaipole

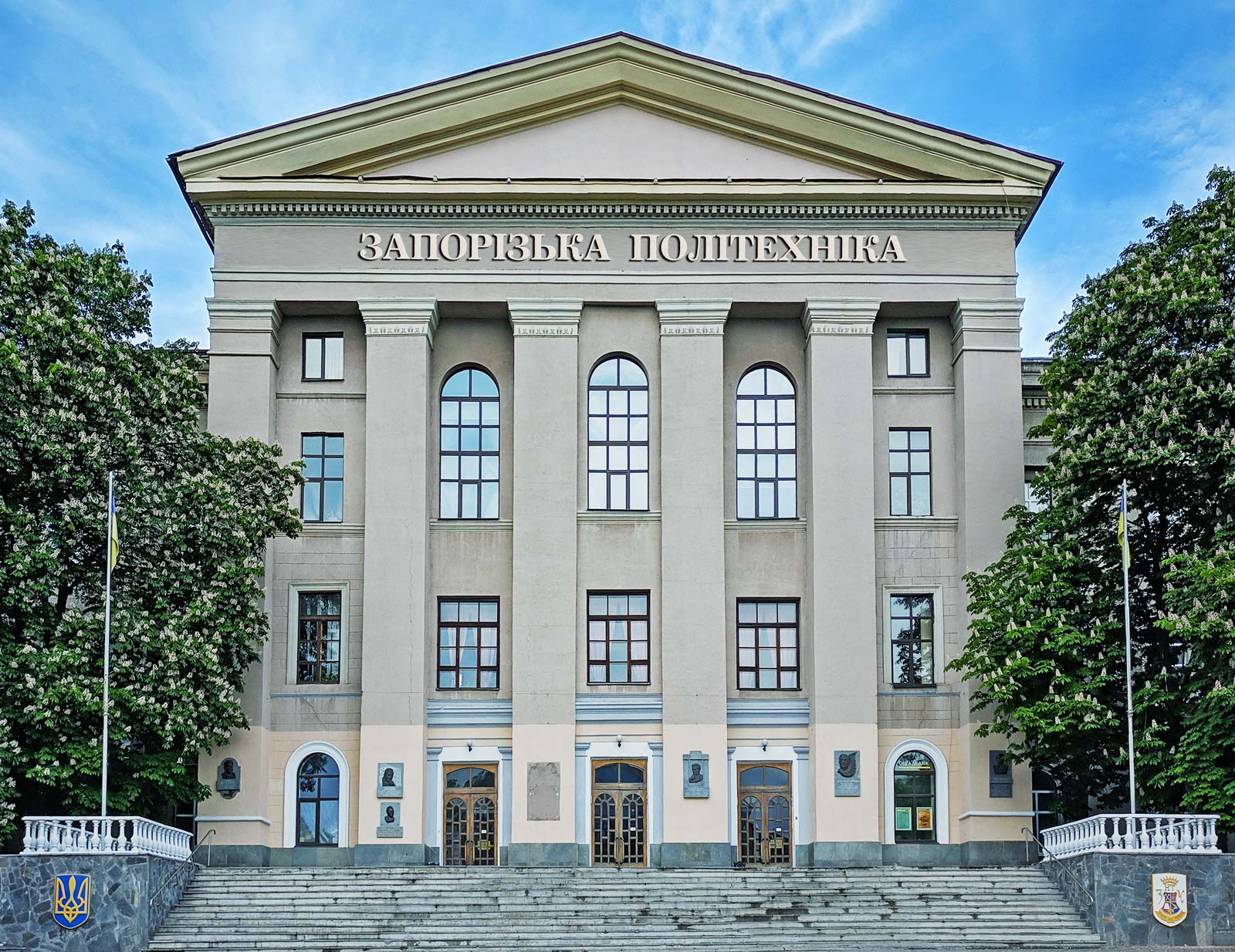
Zaporizhzhia Polytechnic National University

Zaporizhzhia International Airport

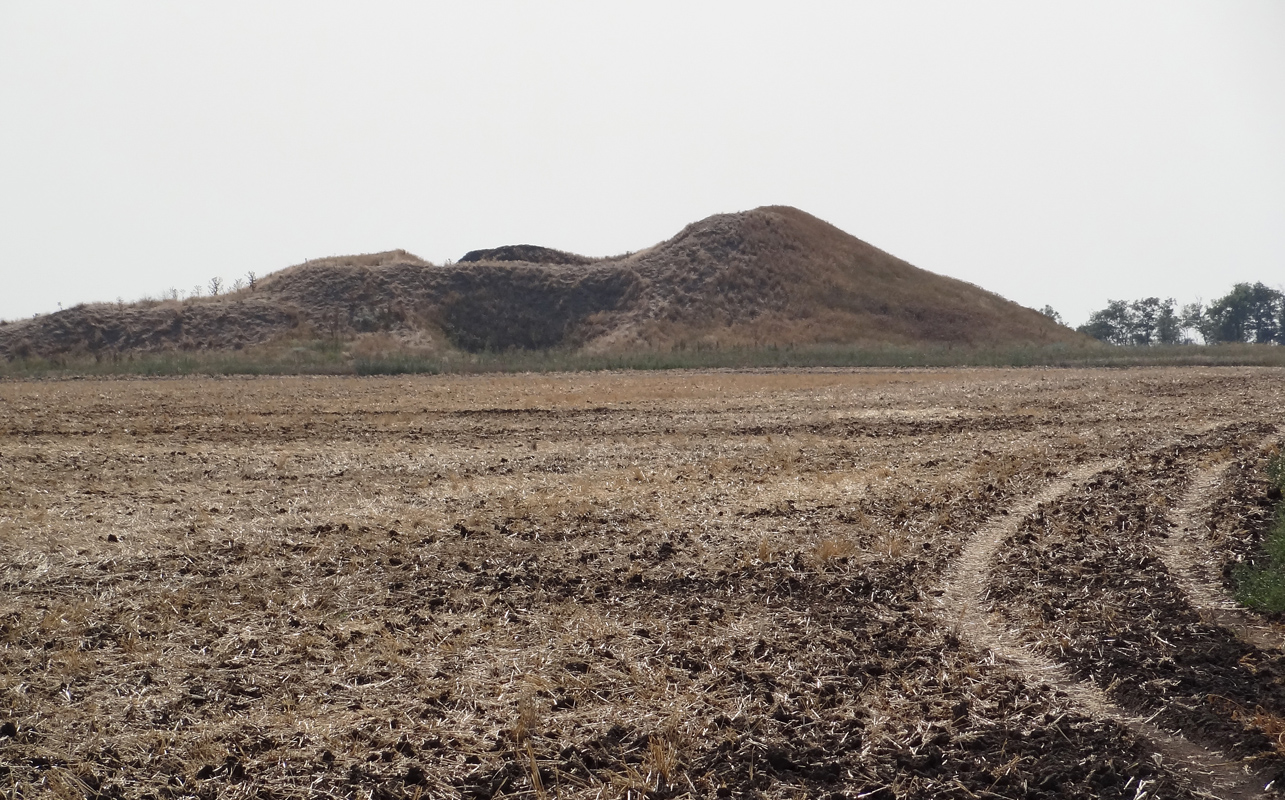
Solokha Kurgan

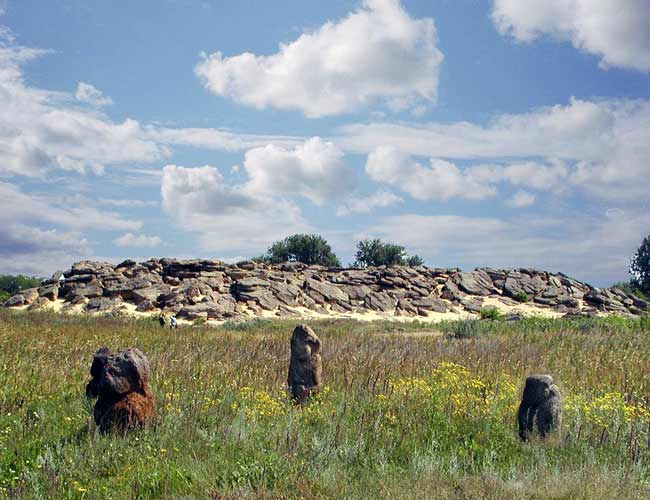
Stone Tomb

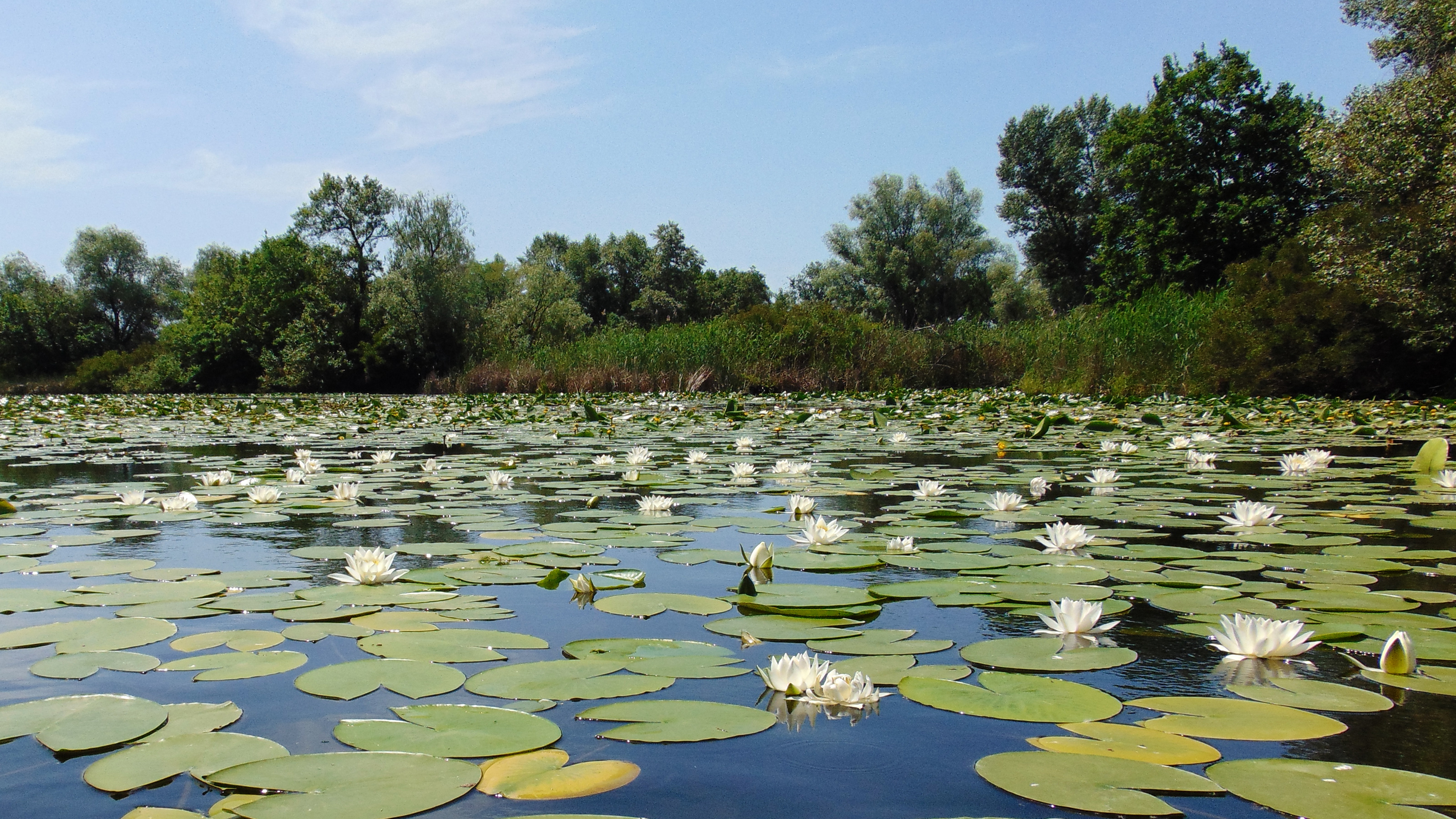
White water lily formation in right-bank Zaporizhzhia Oblast

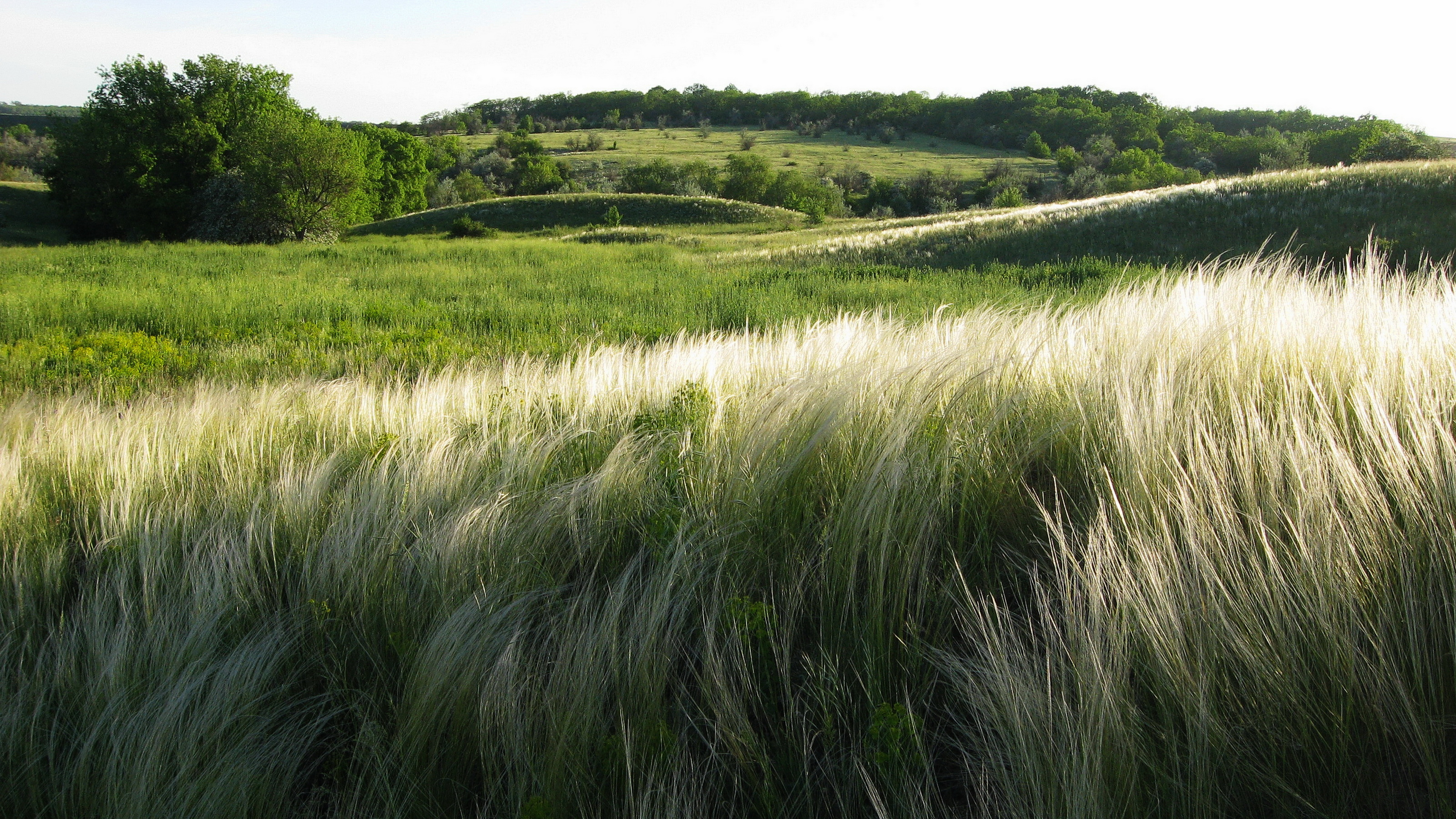
Kaidatska wash

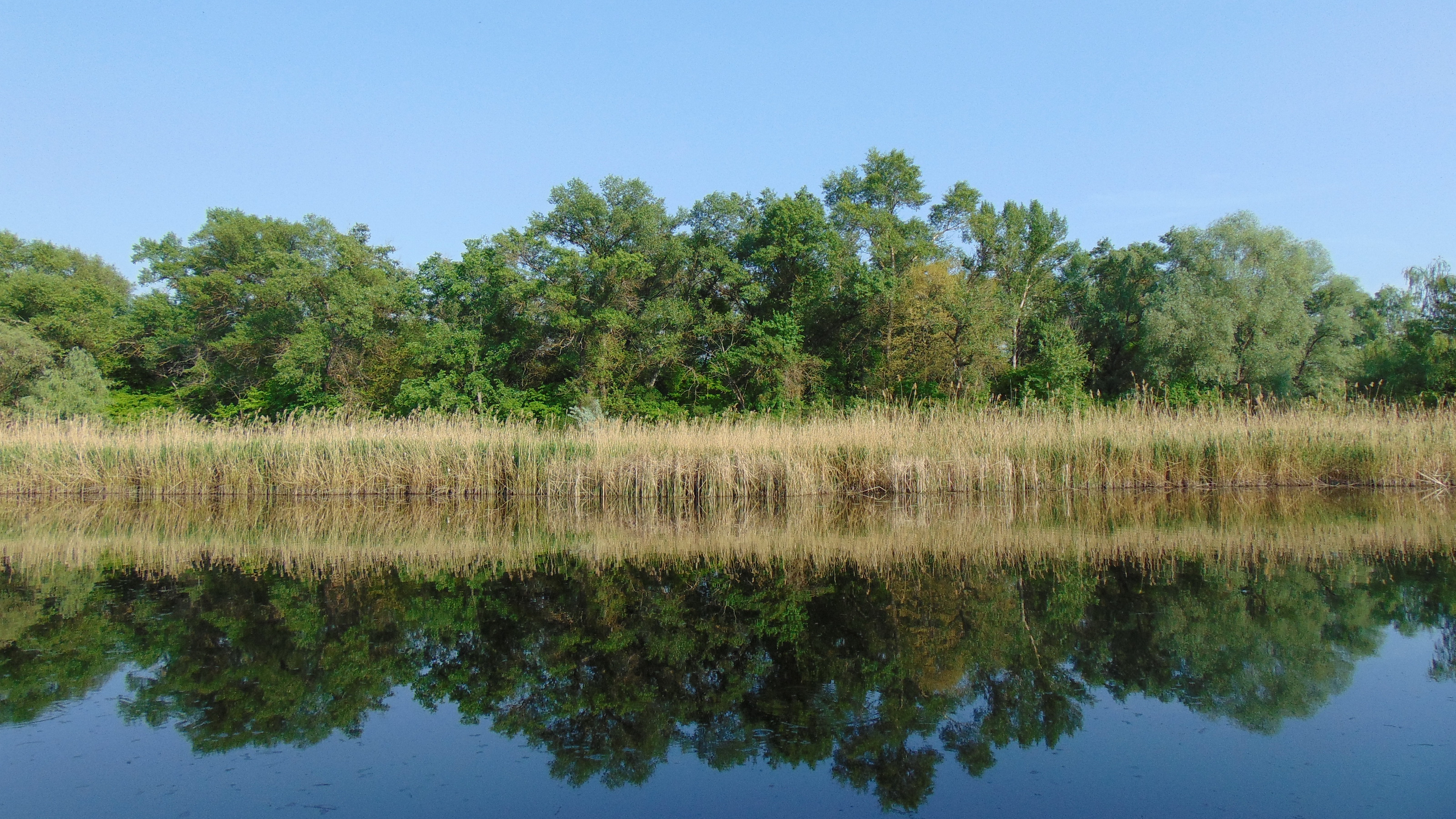
Bilai Archipelago

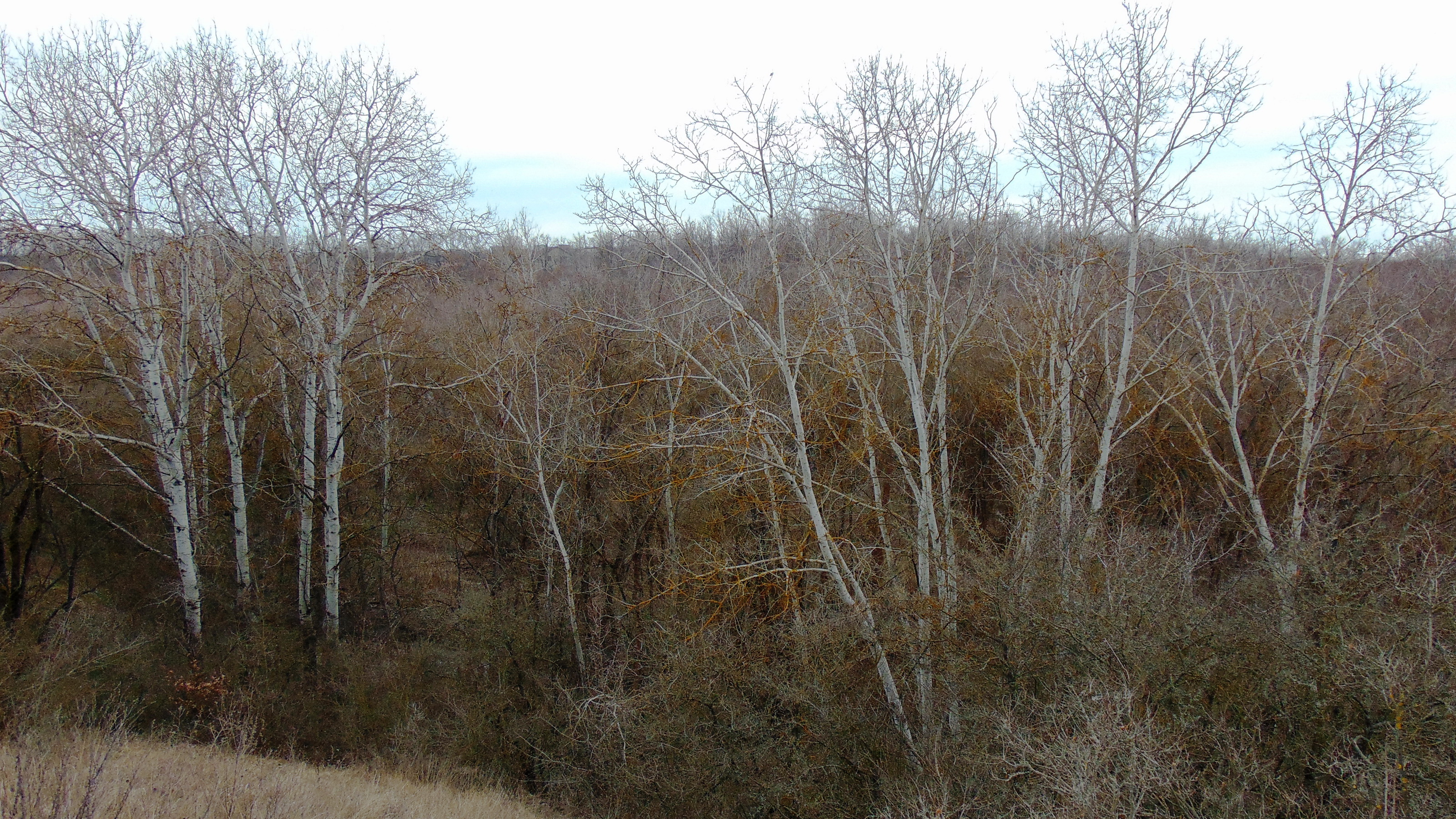
Middle Khortytsia River

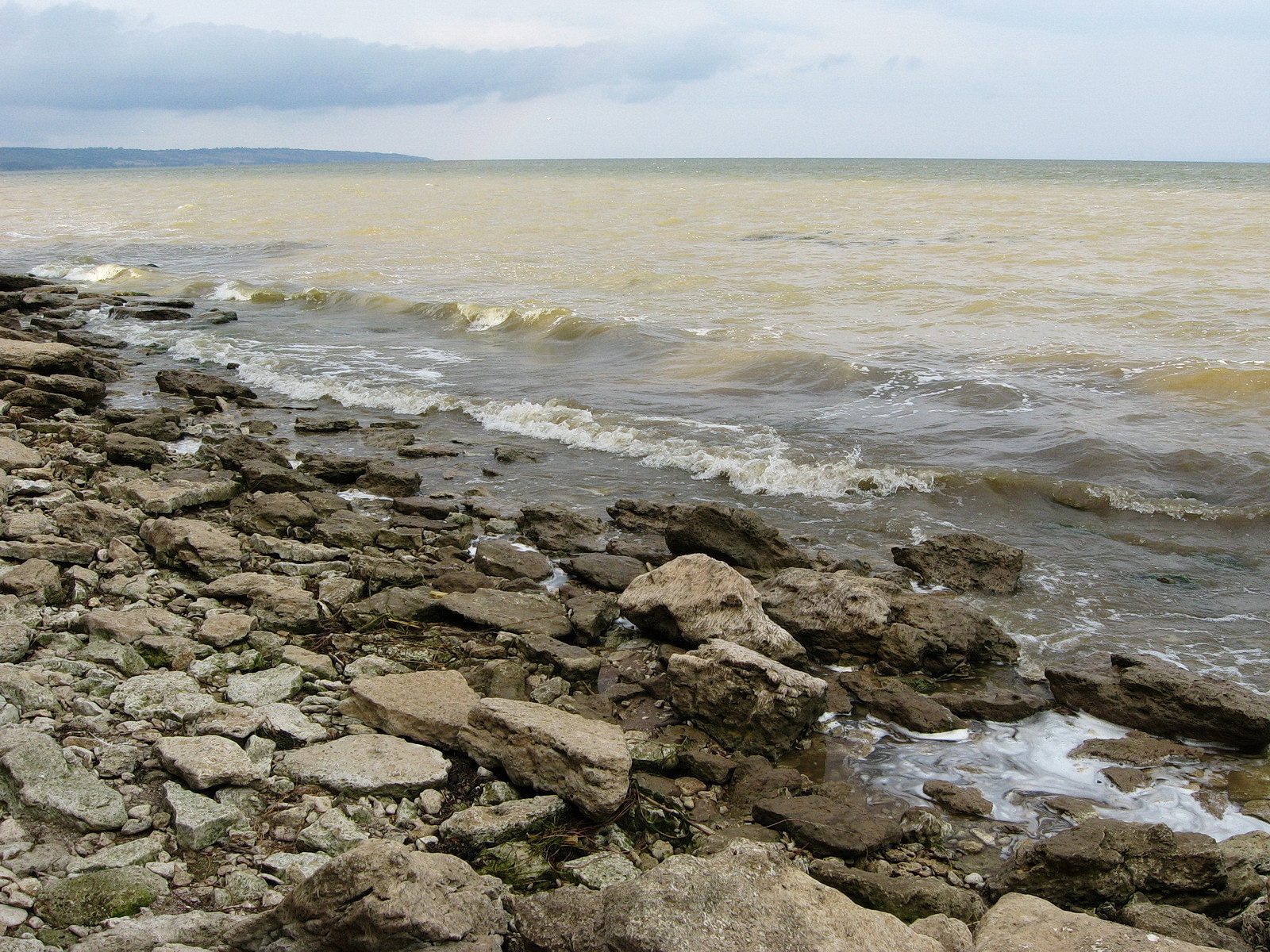
Coast of the Kakhovka Reservoir
