= List of cities in Zaporizhzhia Oblast =

Location of cities in Zaporizhzhia Oblast, with red dots indicating Russian-occupied cities and green dots indicating Ukrainian-controlled cities

There are 14 populated places in Zaporizhzhia Oblast, Ukraine, that have been officially granted city status (Ukrainian: місто, romanized: misto) by the Verkhovna Rada, the country's parliament. Settlements with more than 10,000 people are eligible for city status, although the status is typically also granted to settlements of historical or regional importance. As of 5 December 2001, the date of the first and only official census in the country since independence, (Note: As of 11 July 2023) the most populous city in the oblast was the regional capital, Zaporizhzhia, with a population of 817,882 people, while the least populous city was Molochansk, with 7,964 people. The most recent settlement to receive city status is Enerhodar, which was granted the status by the Verkhovna Rada in 1985.

From independence in 1991 to 2020, five cities in the oblast were designated as cities of regional significance (municipalities), which had self-government under city councils, while the oblast's remaining nine cities were located amongst twenty raions (districts) as cities of district significance, which are subordinated to the governments of the raions. On 18 July 2020, an administrative reform abolished and merged the oblast's raions and cities of regional significance into five new, expanded raions. The five raions that make up the oblast are Berdiansk, Melitopol, Polohy, Vasylivka, and Zaporizhzhia.

After 24 February 2022, during Russia's full-scale invasion of Ukraine, Russian forces occupied three cities in Polohy Raion and all cities located in the Berdiansk, Melitopol, and Vasylivka raions. In the oblast's occupied territory, de facto Russian officials have used the same five raions as Ukraine, while Melitopol (the oblast's most populous city controlled by Russia) serves as the capital for the Russian administration. As of 3 July 2024, ten cities are occupied by Russian forces, while two frontline cities (Huliaipole and Orikhiv) have been nearly destroyed by fighting and Russian shelling. For their contributions to the country's defense during the invasion, Huliaipole and Orikhiv were awarded with the honorary title Hero City of Ukraine in 2025.

As of January 2026, Huliaipole has been captured by Russian forces.

== List of cities ==
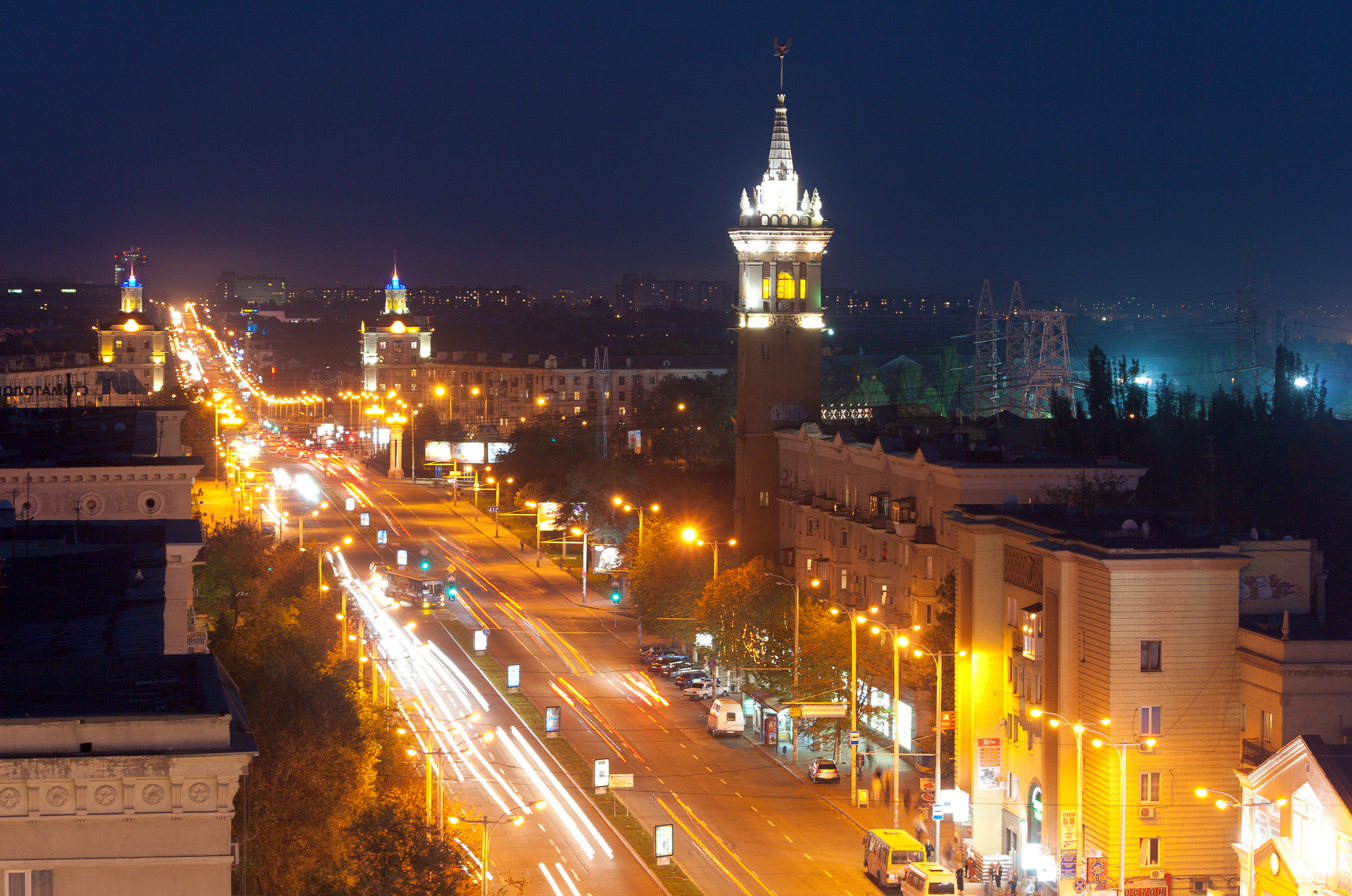
Zaporizhzhia, capital and most populous city in Zaporizhzhia Oblast

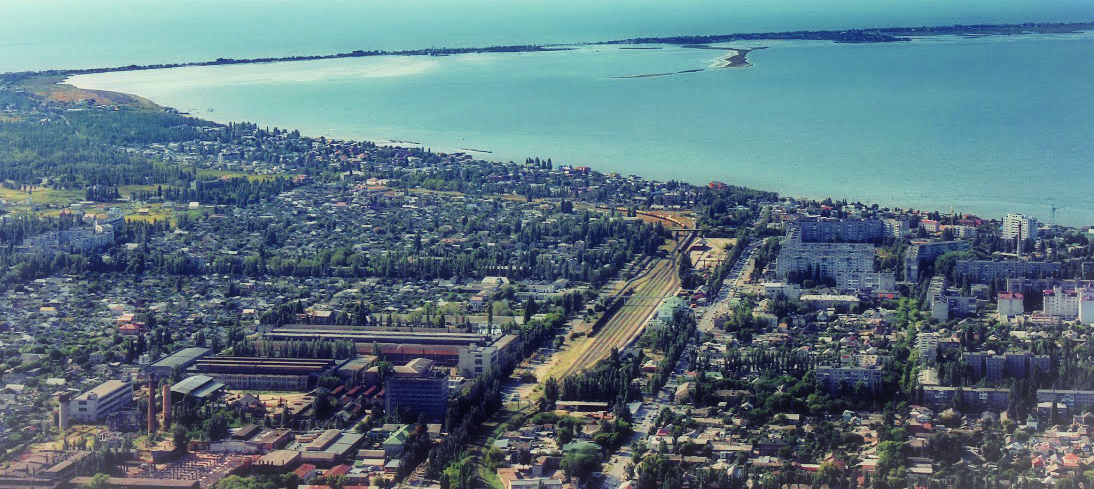
Berdiansk, a large port city on the Sea of Azov and the third most populous city in the oblast

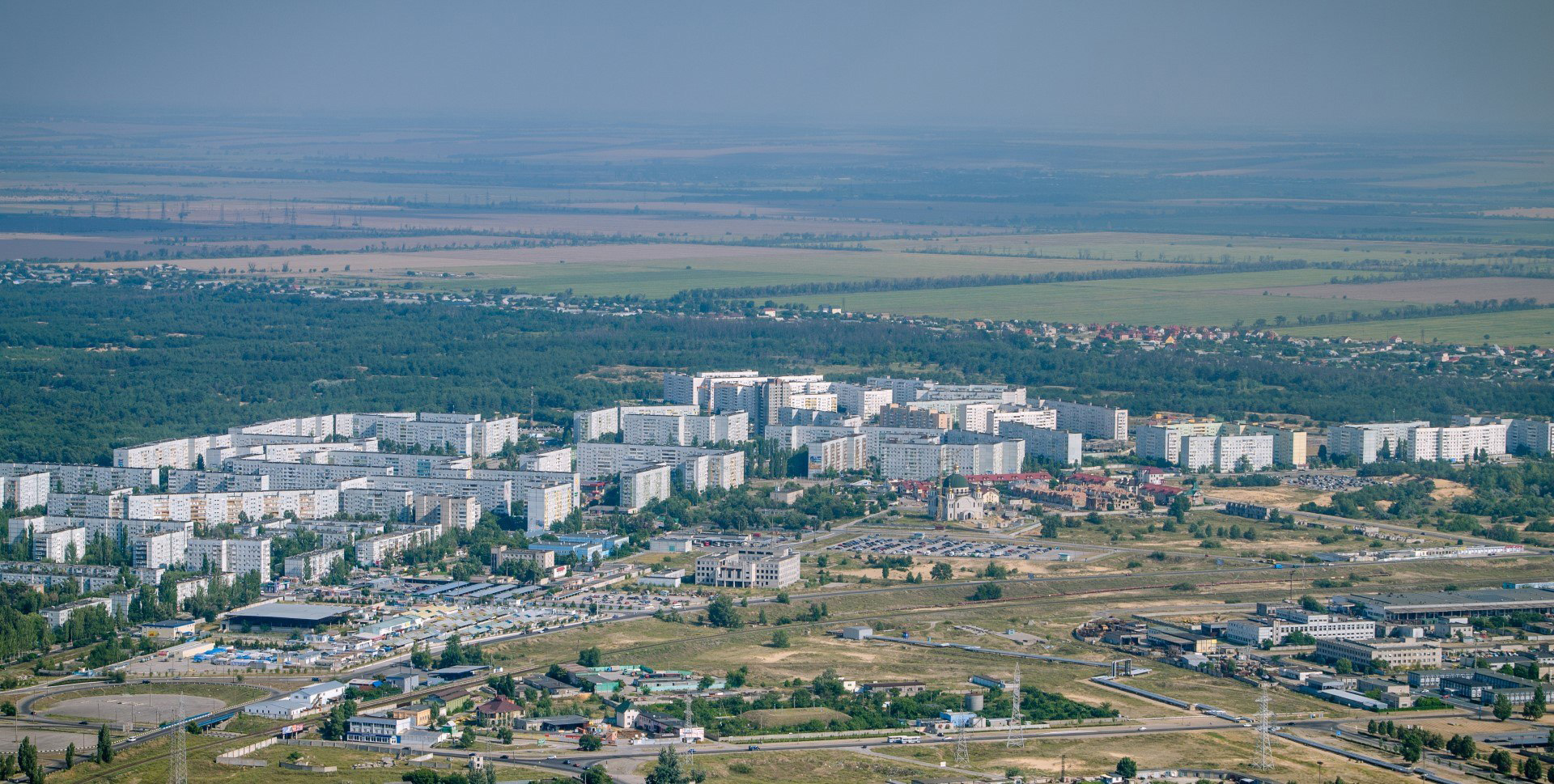
Enerhodar, the oblast's fourth most populous city and site of the largest nuclear power plant in Europe, the Zaporizhzhia Nuclear Power Plant

Cities in Zaporizhzhia Oblast
Name	Name (in Ukrainian) (Note: Links to the Ukrainian Wikipedia articles for each city)	Raion (district)	Population (2022 estimates)	Population (2001 census)	Population change
Berdiansk	Бердянськ	Berdiansk	106,311	121,692	−12.64%
Dniprorudne	Дніпрорудне	Vasylivka	17,736	21,054	−15.76%
Enerhodar	Енергодар	Vasylivka	52,237	56,242	−7.12%
Huliaipole	Гуляйполе	Polohy	12,786	17,077	−25.13%
Kamianka-Dniprovska	Кам'янка-Дніпровська	Vasylivka	12,117	15,522	−21.94%
Melitopol	Мелітополь	Melitopol	148,851	160,657	−7.35%
Molochansk	Молочанськ	Polohy	6,099	7,964	−23.42%
Orikhiv	Оріхів	Polohy	13,896	17,955	−22.61%
Polohy	Пологи	Polohy	18,111	22,206	−18.44%
Prymorsk	Приморськ	Berdiansk	11,157	12,973	−14.00%
Tokmak	Токмак	Polohy	29,573	36,275	−18.48%
Vasylivka	Василівка	Vasylivka	12,567	15,592	−19.40%
Vilniansk	Вільнянськ	Zaporizhzhia	14,324	16,522	−13.30%
Zaporizhzhia	Запоріжжя	Zaporizhzhia	710,052	817,882	−13.18%

== See also ==
- List of cities in Ukraine
