= Ukrainian Wikipedia =

Ukrainian-language edition of Wikipedia

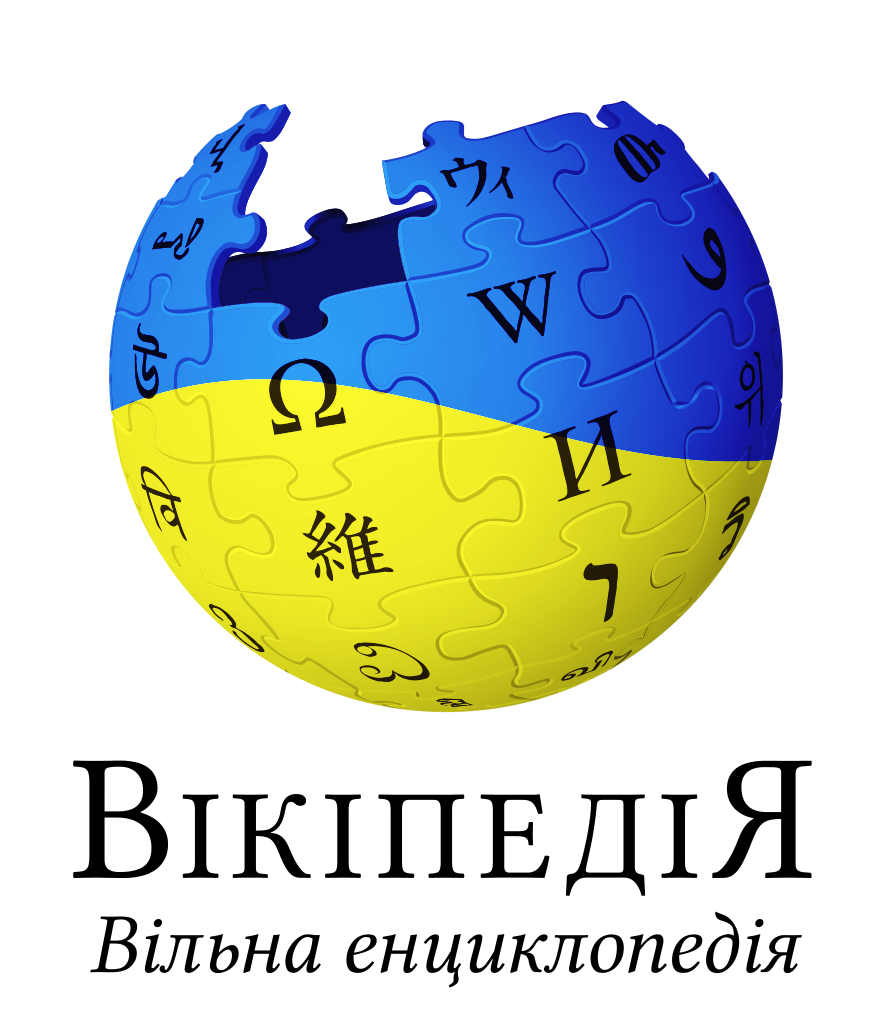
- The logo of Ukrainian Wikipedia, a globe featuring glyphs from several writing systems. Due to the Russian invasion of Ukraine, the logo uses the colors of the Ukrainian flag.

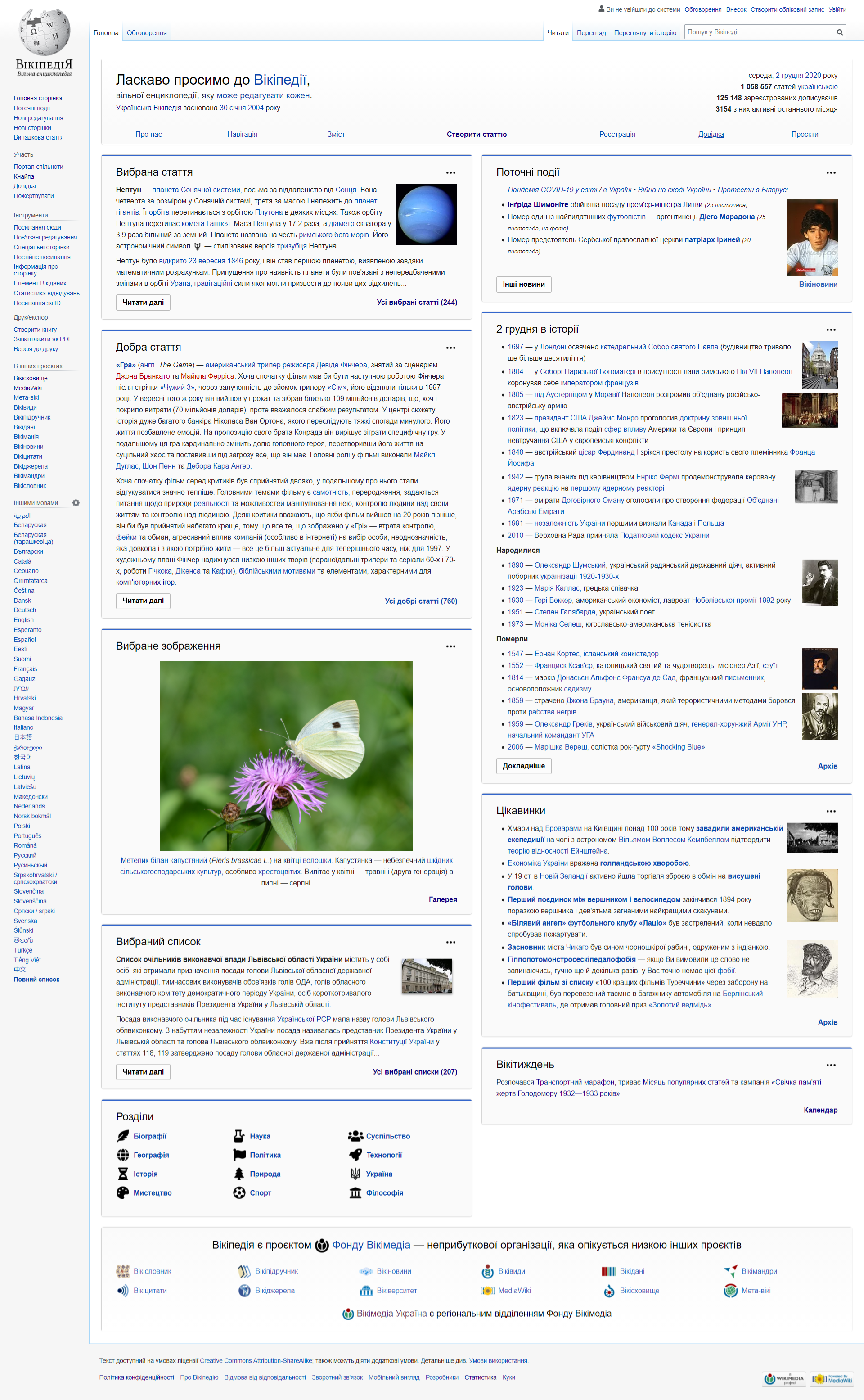
- Screenshot Main Page of the Ukrainian Wikipedia in December 2020
- Website type: Internet encyclopedia project
- Available in: Ukrainian
- Headquarters: Miami, Florida
- Owner: Wikimedia Foundation
- Website: uk.wikipedia.org
- Commercial: No
- Registration: Optional
- Users: 944,090 (as of 27 September 2026)
- Launched: 30 January 2004; 22 years ago
- Content license: Creative Commons Attribution/ Share-Alike 4.0 (most text also dual-licensed under GFDL); Media licensing varies

The Ukrainian Wikipedia (Ukrainian: Українська Вікіпедія, romanized: Ukrainska Vikipediia) is the Ukrainian language edition of the free online encyclopedia, Wikipedia. The first article was written on 30 January 2004. As of September 2026, the Ukrainian Wikipedia has 1,435,766 articles and is the 14th largest Wikipedia edition.

As of November 2022, it is the second most visited language Wikipedia in Ukraine, with 90 million page views, behind the Russian Wikipedia, at 100 million page views. There is a long-term trend for the Ukrainian language edition to be increasingly favored in comparison to the historically dominant Russian language edition.

== Quality of articles and popularity ==
In the Ukrainian Wikipedia, the subject of mining has been covered to a greater extent than all other Wikipedias, due to the considerable contribution by one person, Volodymyr Biletsky, a professor at Donetsk National Technical University. Using the Mining Encyclopedia, Biletsky has contributed over 10,000 articles on the subject to Ukrainian Wikipedia. In 2013, the Institute of History of Ukraine at the National Academy of Science gave permission to the Ukrainian Wikipedia to use the digital version of the Encyclopedia of History of Ukraine that was published online. The Higher School Academy of Science and Forest Engineering also allowed Wikipedia to freely use their information resources.

Generally, before the 2014 Maidan Revolution, Ukrainian Wikipedia held approximately 10 to 20 percent of the pageviews from Ukraine, depending on the season, and grew steadily, reaching a share of 20% in late 2013. The success of Euromaidan and the subsequent improvement in Ukrainian language's status have positively impacted the reach of Ukrainian Wikipedia.

One of the areas where activity is notable is in Wiki Loves Monuments project, an annual international photo contest focused on cultural and historical monuments. Ukrainian Wikipedians were ranked 4th among 36 participating countries for the number of uploads of images as part of this project in 2012. In 2014, Ukrainian Wikipedians were the winners of the contest that year.

As of May 2023, the Ukrainian Wikipedia was the second most popular Wikipedia in Ukraine, slightly below Russian, despite that both language versions have more than a million articles. This is attributed to the historic bilingualism in Ukraine, the Russification of Ukraine and the Ukrainian language during the Tsarist and Soviet era, and the popularity of Russian-language content in present-day Ukraine. However, the popularity of Ukrainian Wikipedia in Ukraine is increasing every year compared to the Russian version.

In January 2016, the ratio of Russian to Ukrainian Wikipedia use was 4.6 times, decreasing to 2.6 times in January 2019, 2.4 times in January 2020, and 2 times in January 2021. Extrapolation shows that in 2025, in Ukraine, the popularity of the Ukrainian Wikipedia will be higher than the popularity of the Russian Wikipedia.

Since the Russian invasion of Ukraine, the difference between the two languages has further decreased, and in October 2022 it was just ten million pageviews (100 million pageviews for Russian in Ukraine and 90 million pageviews for Ukrainian), the lowest ever recorded. Due to the fact that many students consult Ukrainian Wikipedia for information about the literature works, the writers and other parts of the school curriculum, the pageviews of Ukrainian Wikipedia are generally halving during the summer. This trend is observed in many other Wikipedias of the former Soviet space, including Kazakh and Uzbek ones. The impact of this trend tends however to decrease as of 2023. In July 2023 Ukrainian had 61 million pageviews and Russian 87 million pageviews in Ukraine which is lesser than half of the difference 72 million pageviews (112 to 40) in July 2021.

== Articles ==
Some articles of the Ukrainian Wikipedia have been taken from various sources, such as the Encyclopedia of Ukrainian Studies (about 6500), the Ukrainian Soviet Encyclopedia, the Handbook of the History of Ukraine (edited by Podkova and Shust), the Encyclopedia of Mining of Volodymyr Biletskyy and from official sources of information of state institutions.

=== History of the Ukrainian language ===
A significant number of articles in Ukrainian Wikipedia relate to the history of the development of the Ukrainian language. A study in August 2012 counted over 8,000 articles mentioning the term "Ukrainian language" and over 1,400 articles with the term "history of Ukrainian language" and concluded that collectively represented a good coverage of its history and concepts. Articles about the history of Ukrainian language included articles about early publications like bibles printed in Ukrainian, grammar books, changes in phonetics through time, Ukrainian calligraphy, history of Ukrainian language within the context of the Soviet Union, linguicide and the banning of Ukrainian language by the Russian Government.

=== History and science ===
At the end of 2012, the Ukrainian Wikipedia contained over 1,500 articles relating to Ukrainian history. As of June 2012, the Ukrainian Wikipedia contained 52 specific articles about Ukrainian astronomers and astronomo-geodesists, which have now been collated into a published book.

== Community ==
Approximately twenty thousand users have made at least one edit in Ukrainian Wikipedia. On average, three thousand editors are active per month.

Despite the decrease in Ukraine's population, the Ukrainian Wikipedia has recorded an ever-increasing amount of active contributors throughout the 2010s and the early 2020s.

Wikimedia Ukraine is the chapter of Wikimedia foundation in Ukraine. It is charged with promoting Wikipedia in Ukraine. Apart from online editathons, Wikimedia Ukraine also hosts Wikimarathon, an article creation contest that includes article creation workshops which take place in various cities of Ukraine with the coordination of various Ukrainian Wikipedians. Wikimarathon takes place in late January, honouring the creation of Ukrainian Wikipedia on January 30, 2004. Wikimarathon workshops, as well the contest itself, have received significant coverage from Ukrainian media. Additionally, a goal of Wikimedia Ukraine according to one of its administrators is to make the Ukrainian language Wikipedia more popular than the Russian language one by cooperating with Google to place Ukrainian-language pages higher up in Google search results if an article in both languages exists.

The most contributors of Ukrainian Wikipedia are from Ukraine. Many of them are from Kyiv, the capital of Ukraine. Other Ukrainian oblasts which constitute the homeland of many Ukrainian Wikipedians are Lviv and Donetsk oblasts.

== Criticism ==
In 2023 Ukrainian Wikipedia published on its social media an article by Vira Motorko, the Functionary of the Year 2024, saying that despite public outrage, Ukrainian Wikipedia cannot change its Polivanov system developed for the Russian language while there is no obvious consensus between notable institutions in the field.

Valentyna Kodola, an ex-member of Wikimedia Ukraine and ex-editor, claims that some Putinists are present among the administrators, and that is why she was banned for her patriotic position.

== Blackout ==
On 21 January 2014, in the events of the Euromaidan, the Ukrainian Wikipedia community joined the protest against "dictatorship laws" in Ukraine, that restrict the freedom of speech and pose a threat to the portal. The group of laws would allow the government to block websites that are engaged in spreading broadly defined "extremist information". The editors announced a daily 30-minute strike between 4:00 and 4:30 PM. During that time, the Ukrainian pages of Wikipedia were not accessible to readers worldwide.

== Statistics ==
Ukrainian Wikipedia
| Articles | 1435766 |
| Files | 115278 |
| Edits | 48815155 |
| Users | 944090 |
| Active users (Note: Registered users who have performed an action in the last 30 days; the number of unregistered active users is not compiled) | 4904 |
| Admins | 44 |

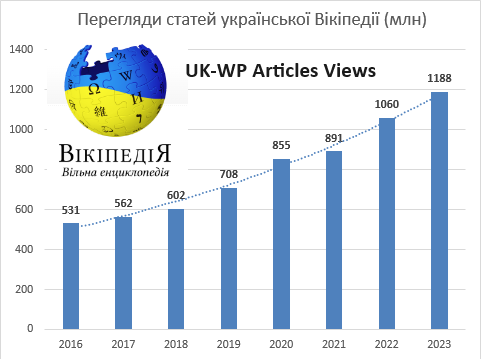
Page views statistics (in millions) of the Ukrainian Wikipedia (2016-2023)

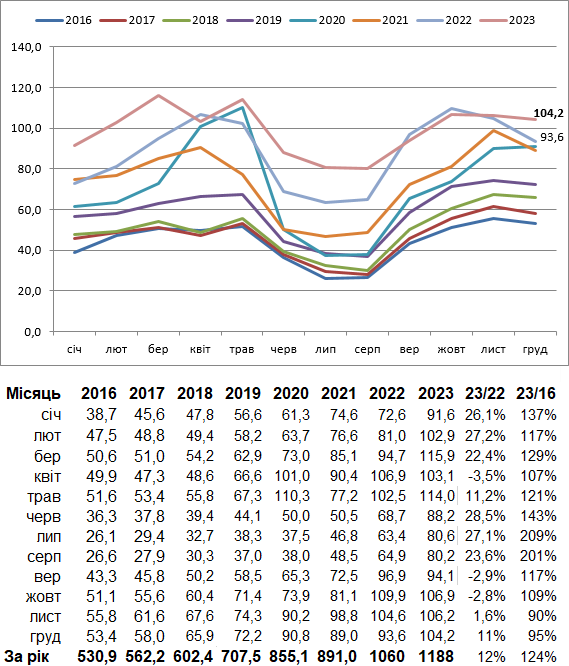
Monthly page views statistics (in millions) of the Ukrainian Wikipedia (2016-2023)

On 1 October 2005, Ukrainian Wikipedia reached the 20,000-article mark. The milestone of 250,000 articles was officially reached on 21 December 2010, and 860,000 people had viewed 30 million articles in that month alone.

By 2012, with over 400,000 articles and 100 million words, the Ukrainian Wikipedia by far had content larger than the largest printed encyclopedia at that time — the Ukrainian Soviet Encyclopedia.

On 23 March 2020, the Ukrainian Wikipedia reached 1,000,000 articles, when user Oleh Kushch published an article about American folk singer Odetta.

As of March 2022, the Ukrainian Wikipedia has nearly 3.6 million visitors every day. The Ukrainian Wikipedia at that time was on the 16th place in the ranking of the world's Wikipedias.

=== Milestones ===
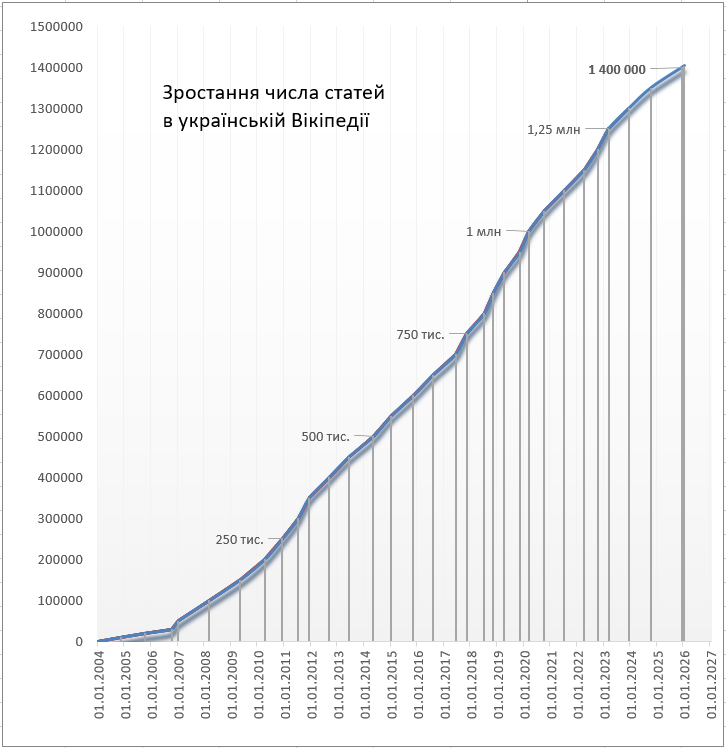
Growth in the number of Ukrainian Wikipedia articles

- 30 January 2004 — 1st article
- 4 April 2004 — 1,000 articles
- 18 June 2004 — 5,000 articles
- 16 December 2004 — 10,000 articles
- 1 October 2005 — 20,000 articles
- 15 October 2006 — 30,000 articles
- 12 November 2006 — 40,000 articles
- 16 January 2007 — 50,000 articles
- 17 May 2007 — 60,000 articles
- 9 September 2007 — 70,000 articles
- 13 December 2007 — 80,000 articles
- 24 January 2008 — 90,000 articles
- 28 March 2008 — 100,000 articles
- 13 July 2008 — 120,000 articles
- 30 May 2009 — 150,000 articles
- 7 April 2010 — 200,000 articles
- 20 December 2010 — 250,000 articles
- 7 July 2011 — 300,000 articles
- 28 December 2011 - 350 000 articles
- 20 September 2012 — 400,000 articles
- 12 May 2014 — 500,000 articles
- 13 November 2015 — 600,000 articles
- 4 June 2017 — 700,000 articles
- 10 July 2018 — 800,000 articles
- 19 April 2019 — 900,000 articles
- 23 March 2020 — 1,000,000 articles
- 5 July 2021 — 1,100,000 articles
- 10 October 2022 — 1,200,000 articles
- 9 December 2023 — 1,300,000 articles
- 14 December 2025 — 1,400,000 articles

== Gallery ==
Milestone logos

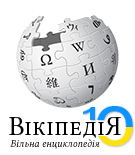
Ukrainian Wikipedia's ten year anniversary logo

Ukrainian Wikipedia's 15 year anniversary logo

Ukrainian Wikipedia's 16 year anniversary logo

Ukrainian Wikipedia's 1,000,000 articles logo

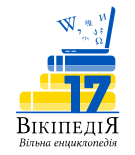
Ukrainian Wikipedia's 17 year anniversary logo

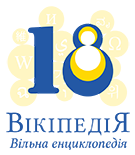
Ukrainian Wikipedia's 18 year anniversary logo

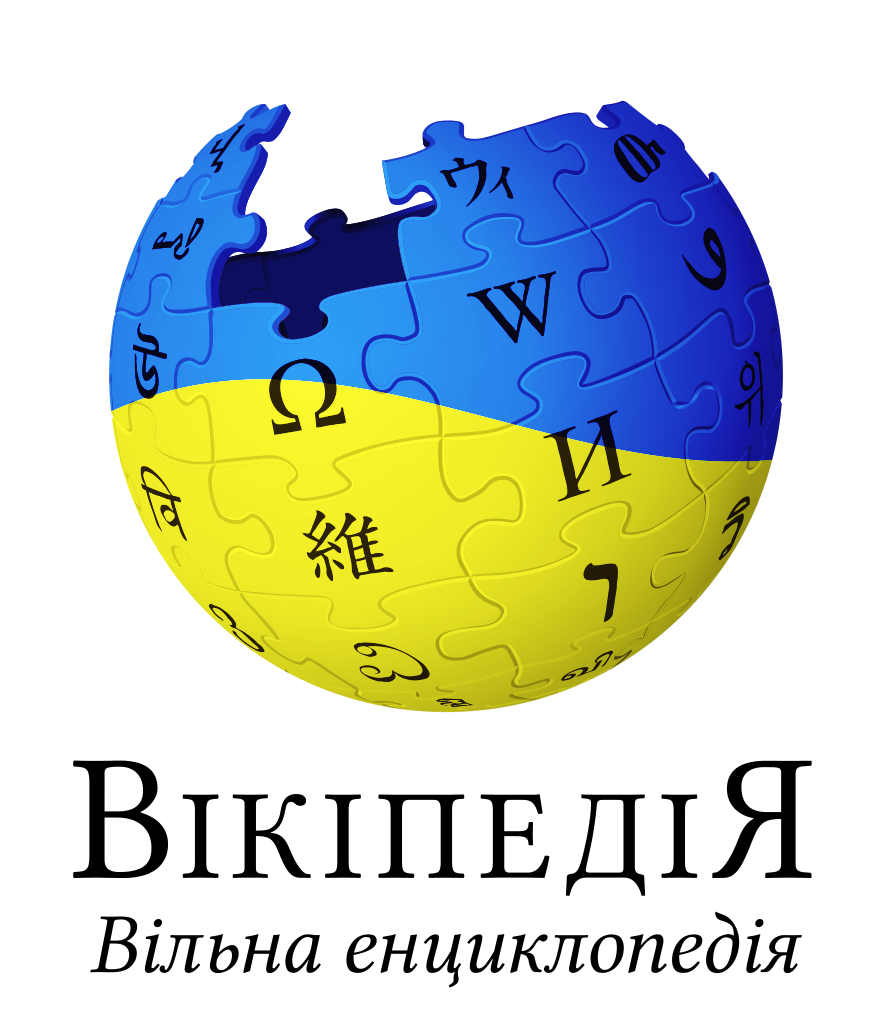
Ukrainian Wikipedia's logo after the Russian invasion of Ukraine in 2022
