= Mining Encyclopedia =

Ukrainian-language encyclopedia set

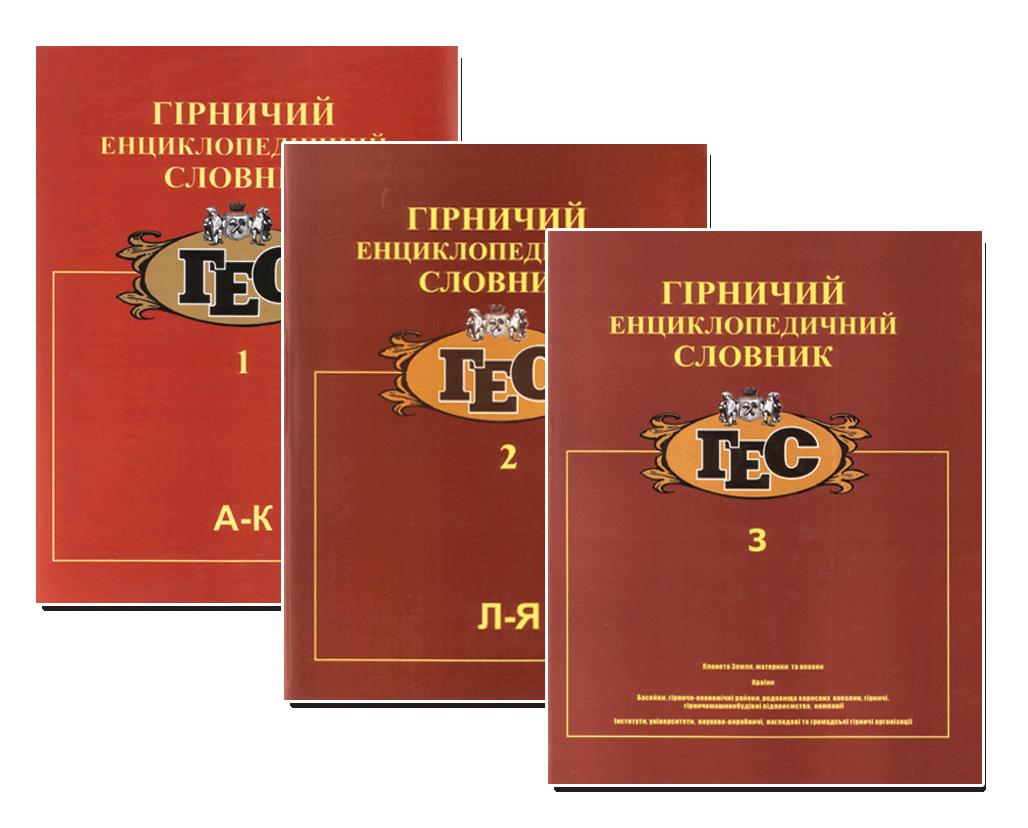
Encyclopedic Dictionary of Mining

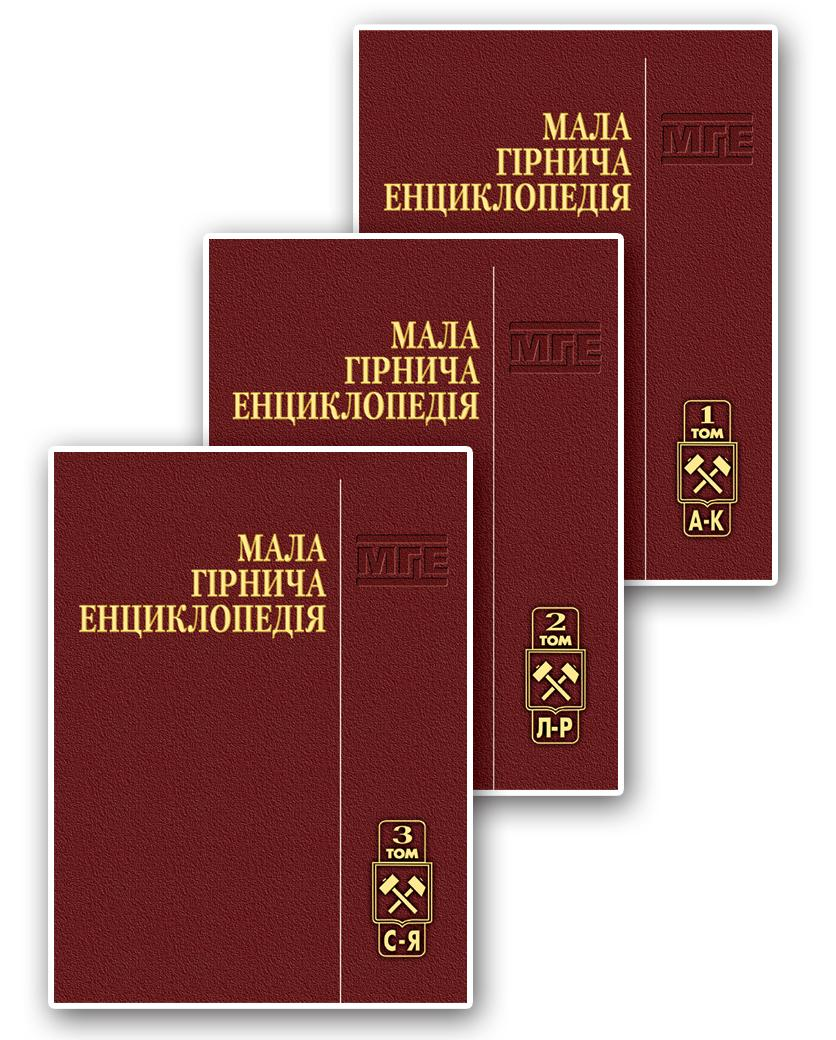
Concise Mining Encyclopaedia

The Mining Encyclopedia (Ukrainian: Гірнича енциклопедія) is a comprehensive set of Ukrainian-language encyclopedias about the science and technology of mining. The encyclopedias were compiled by a team of earth scientists headed by Ukrainian researcher Volodymyr Biletskyy.

== History ==
Biletskyy was the main author, editor, and project manager of the encyclopedia. He led about 150 leading earth scientists from Ukraine and abroad in writing the encyclopedias. The first installment of the project, the Explanatory Dictionary of Mining (Ukrainian: Тлумачний гірничий словник) was published in print in 1998 by the Donetsk National Technical University and is available online.

The second phase of the project involved the publication of the three-volume Encyclopedic Dictionary of Mining (Ukrainian: Гірничий енциклопедичний словник) between 2001 and 2004. This set contains 12,700 encyclopedic articles.

The third stage involved the publication of the three-volume Concise Mining Encyclopedia (Ukrainian: Мала гірнича енциклопедія) between 2004 and 2013. This comprehensive set contains 17,350 entries with numerous illustrations. (Note: Some of the illustrations are available at Wikimedia Commons.) This version of the encyclopedia is multilingual; all entries are written simultaneously in the Ukrainian, Russian, English, and German languages.

VN Karazin Kharkiv National University nominated the Mining Encyclopedia for the State Prize of Ukraine in the field of education in 2017.

== Use ==
The Dnipro University of Technology (Dnipro Polytechnic) uses the Mining Encyclopedia as a textbook.

== See also ==
- Geology of Ukraine
- List of mines in Ukraine
- Science and technology in Ukraine
