= Kamiane, Zaporizhzhia Oblast =

Rural locality in Zaporizhzhia Oblast, Ukraine

Kamiane Кам'яне
- Rural settlement
- Location of Kamiane Kamiane (Ukraine)
- Coordinates: 47°52′28″N 35°23′57″E
- Country: Ukraine
- Oblast: Zaporizhzhia Oblast
- Raion: Zaporizhzhia Raion
- Hromada: Matviivka rural hromada
- Founded: 1886
- Settlement status: 11 February 1986

Area
  - Total: 2 km^{2} (0.77 sq mi)
- Elevation: 100 m (330 ft)

Population (2022)
  - Total: 1,117
  - Density: 560/km^{2} (1,400/sq mi)
- Time zone: UTC+2 (EET)
  - Summer (DST): UTC+3 (EEST)
- Postal code: 70050
- Area code: +380 6143
- Climate: Dfa

Kamiane (Ukrainian: Кам'яне) is a rural settlement in Zaporizhzhia Raion, Zaporizhzhia Oblast, southern Ukraine. It was formerly administered within Vilniansk Raion until 2020. Population: 1,117 (2022 estimate). Kamiane is the administrative center of Kamiane Council, a local government area.

== History ==
The settlement was first founded in 1886 as a settlement Voznesenivka or Vozdvyzhenka (Ukrainian: Воздвиженка). After the World War II it was renamed as Kamiane. On 11 February 1986 it became an urban-type settlement.

Until 26 January 2024, Kamiane was designated urban-type settlement. On this day, a new law entered into force which abolished this status, and Kamiane became a rural settlement.
