= Matviivka, Zaporizhzhia Raion, Zaporizhzhia Oblast =

Village in Zaporizhia province, Ukraine

Matviivka Матвіївка
- Village
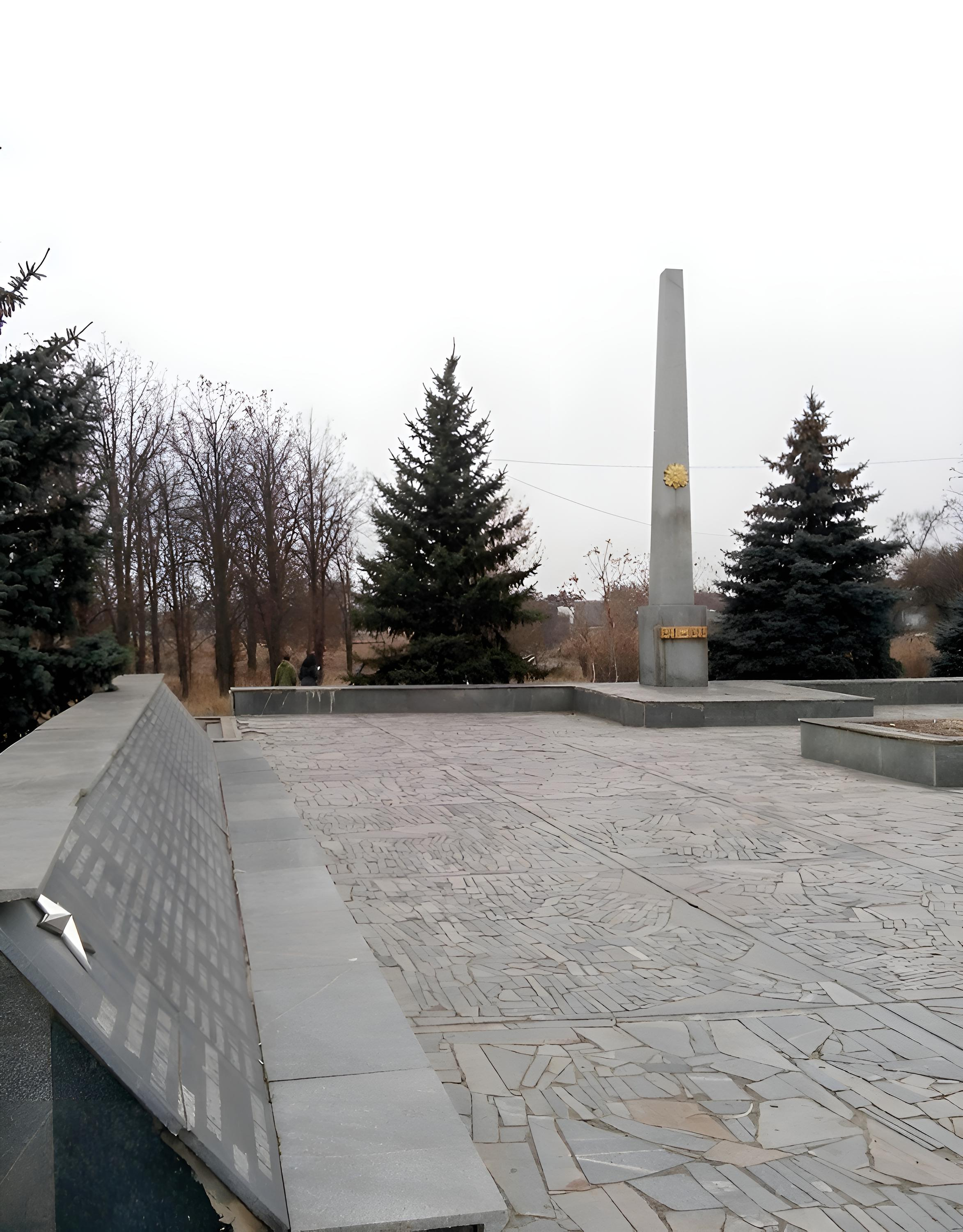
- World War II memorial in the village center

- Location within Zaporizhzhia Oblast Location within Ukraine
- Coordinates: 47°54′18″N 35°18′19″E
- Country: Ukraine
- Oblast: Zaporizhzhia Oblast
- Raion: Zaporizhzhia Raion
- Hromada: Matviivka rural hromada
- Established: 1918

Area
  - Total: 4.17 km^{2} (1.61 sq mi)
- Elevation: 103 m (338 ft)

Population
  - Total: 3,878
- Postal code: 70035

Matviivka (Ukrainian: Матві́ївка) is a village in southern Ukraine, located in Zaporizhzhia Raion, Zaporizhzhia Oblast. It is the administrative center of Matviivka rural hromada.

== History ==
Until 17 July 2020, Matviivka was administratively located in Vilniansk Raion, which was abolished and its territory transferred to Zaporizhzhia Raion.

== Demographics ==
As of the 2001 Ukrainian census, Matviivka had a population of 3,902 inhabitants. The exact linguistic composition was as follows:

Languages in Matviivka
	percent
Ukrainian	80.4%
Russian	19.0%
Belarusian	0.2%
Armenian	0.1%
others	0.2%

== Notable people ==
- Volodymyr Biletskyy (born 1950), mining engineer
