= Volodymyr Biletskyy =

Ukrainian mining engineer (born 1950)

- Володимир Білецький
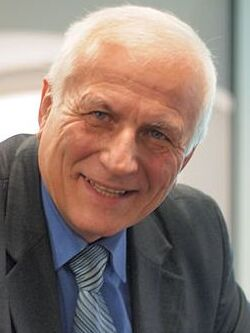
- Biletskyy in December 2012
- Born: January 26, 1950 (age 76); Matviivka, Vilniansk Raion, Zaporizhzhia Oblast, Ukrainian SSR, Soviet Union
- Citizenship: Ukrainian
- Education: National Mining University of Ukraine
- Known for: Initiator and project manager of the Mining Encyclopedia
- Awards: Order of Merit (Third Class)
- Scientific career
- Fields: Mineral processing, mining
- Workplaces: Donetsk National Technical University, Poltava National Technical Yuriy Kondratyuk University, Kharkiv Polytechnic Institute

Volodymyr Stefanovych Biletskyy (Ukrainian: Володимир Стефанович Білецький; born 26 January 1950) is a Ukrainian mining engineer, D.Sc. scientist, and researcher in the field of coal mining, publisher and political scientist. He has published many technical articles on the subject of mining, and was the initiator and editor of the first Ukrainian Mining Encyclopedia.

== Biography ==
Biletskyy finished Vilniansk high school in 1967 and then studied at the electro-technical faculty of the National Mining University of Ukraine. Graduating in 1972, he worked as an engineer in the research department of the faculty of automation of manufacturing processes at the same university (1974–1975). Between 1975 and 1976, he worked as the chief engineer at the coal mine operated by the State Coal Enterprise in Makiivka, and then as a research assistant in the electrical department of the Makiivka Research Institute, researching safety in mining production between 1977 and 1979. In 1981, Biletskyy then became the head research assistant at the Donetsk National Technical University.

In 1986, Biletsky finished his post-graduate studies. In 1994, he completed his Doctorate in Technical Science and in 2004, he was elected as an academic to the Academy of Economic Sciences of Ukraine (a public-funded research institution part of the National Academy of Sciences of Ukraine). In 2005, he became a Corresponding Member of the institute.

Beginning in 2006, he was professor in the faculty of Mineral processing at the Donetsk National Technical University. In 2012, Biletskyy became Academician at the Academy of Mining Sciences of Ukraine. In 2014, he was a professor at the Poltava National Technical Yuriy Kondratyuk University. Since 2017, he has been a professor at the Kharkiv Polytechnic Institute.

== Scientific research and publishing ==
Biletskyy was the science editor of the Mining Encyclopedia (1998–2013), which contributed to creating a nationally unified mining terminological system in Ukraine. He has freely donated the contents of this multiple-volume set to Wikipedia and has incorporated it into thousands of articles covering mining and technology subjects on Ukrainian Wikipedia.

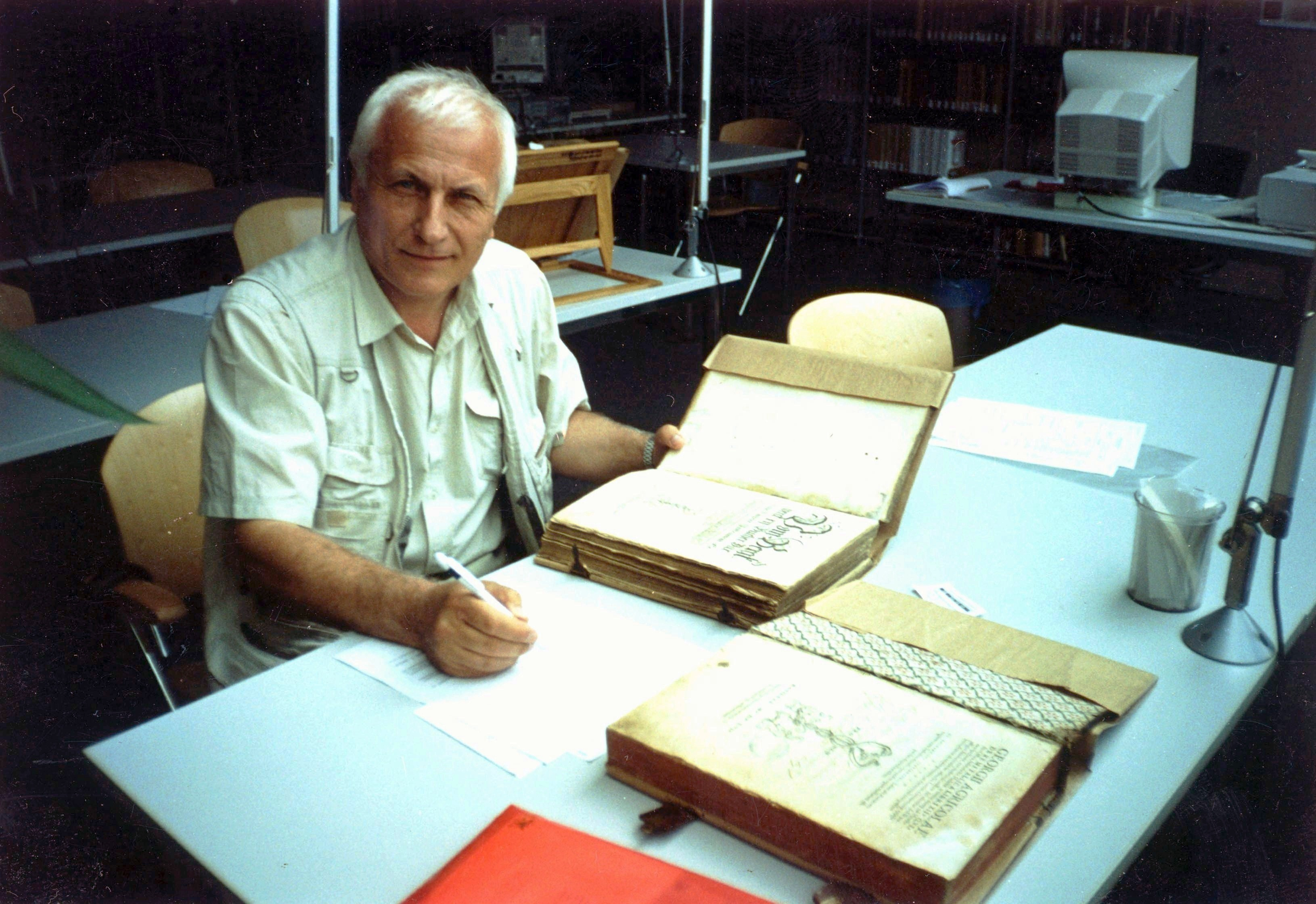
Biletskyy in 2005

He has published over 850 academic papers, including more than 80 books (monographs, course books, dictionaries, and encyclopedias). He is also the author of over 200 articles in popular science and science magazines. He is a founder and editor-in-chief of the national scientific and informational-analytical magazine Skhid (since 1995 an academic periodical on philosophy, history and economics) and the founder and co-editor of the Donetsk Herald of Shevchenko Scientific Society.

A regular contributor to the Ukrainian Wikipedia, by 2015 Biletskyy had created more than 41,000 articles and performed more than 290,000 edits on Wikipedia.

Biletskyy is the owner of 70 patents regarding various processing and transporting technologies in Ukraine.

== Public activities ==
Originally a member of the Communist Party of Ukraine (1975–1990), Biletskyy later became one of the co-founders of the People's Movement of Ukraine (Rukh) in Donbas. Biletskyy left Rukh in 1997. Between 1997 and 2012, Biletskyy was consultant to the Deputies of the Verkhovna Rada (Ukrainian Parliament), O.V. Kulyk, Ivan Drach, and O.I. Klymenko.

Biletskyy is a co-founder and head of the Donetsk branch of Shevchenko Scientific Society (1997), the Donetsk branch of Ukrajina-Svit Association (1997), the Donetsk Regional Association of the Ukrainian language (1989). He heads the research and editing foundation Ukrainian Centre of Culture Studies (Donetsk, Ukraine), which he founded in 1994, and is currently on the Consultative Council for Nationalities Questions at the Donetsk Region State Administration.

Volodymyr Biletskyy has received a number of awards and decorations for his publishing, political, social and cultural activities including an Order of Merit (Third Class) from the President of Ukraine, Viktor Yushchenko.
