= Dnipro Polytechnic =

Public university in Dnipro, Ukraine

Coordinates: 48.4556°N 35.0622°E

- Національний технічний університет «Дніпровська політехніка»
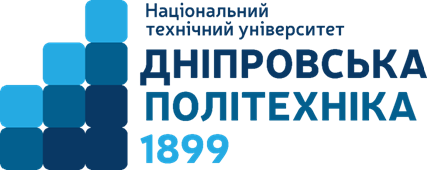
- Motto: Дніпровська політехніка – відповідність часу
- Motto in English: Dnipro University of Technology – Moving with the Times
- Type: Public
- Established: June 16, 1899
- Affiliations: Ministry of Education and Science of Ukraine
- Academic affiliations: Magna Charta Universitatum; BSUN; Euroasian Universities Association; International Society for Engineering Education; ISRM; International University of Resources; World Mining Congress; IAU
- Rector: Aziukovskyi Oleksandr
- Administrative staff: 850
- Students: 16,000
- Location: Dnipro, Ukraine
- Campus: Urban
Colors
- Website: www.nmu.org.ua

Immovable Monument of National Significance of Ukraine
- Official name: Будинок гірничого інституту (Building of the Mining Institute)
- Type: Architecture
- Reference no.: 040033

University rankings

Regional – Overall
- QS Emerging Europe and Central Asia: 351-400 (2022)

The Dnipro Polytechnic (Ukrainian: Національний технічний університет «Дніпровська політехніка», (Note: rendered as Ukrainian: Natsionalnyi technichnyi universytet "Dniprovska Politekhnika") lit. National Technical University "Dnipro Polytechnic", abbr. NTU DP, НТУ ДП) is a state-sponsored polytechnic in Dnipro, Ukraine.

The polytechnic was founded in 1899 as the Yekaterinoslav Higher Mining School. According to the ratings of UNESCO it achieved 6th position among the 200 Top universities in Ukraine in 2009.

== The university today ==
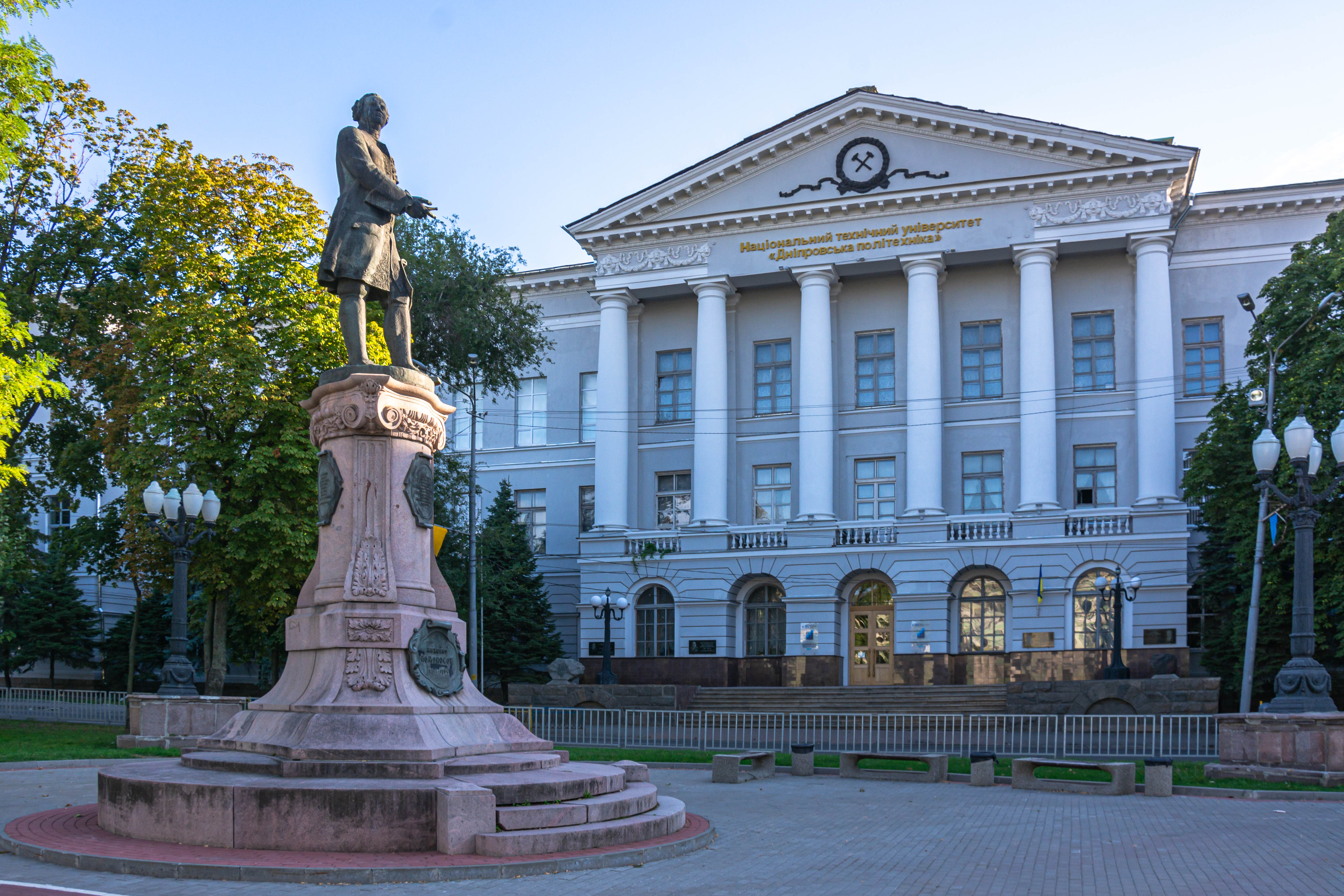
The main building of the university is located on Dmytro Yavornytsky Prospect, Dnipro's main urban thoroughfare.

At the University there are 53 departments (27 of which are major-based) united into 9 faculties of full-time education. There is also an Institute of Extramural Learning and a number of post-graduate and doctoral courses. The university has an Interbranch Institute of Continuing Learning, Scientific and Research Unit, Ukrainian-American Linguistic Center, Linguistic Center, Ukrainian German Cultural Center, Ukrainian-Spanish-Latin-American Center, Center for Ukrainian-Polish Cooperation, and Energy Saving and Energy Management Center. The polytechnic also has links with the Prydniprovsk Science-and-Technology Center of Information Protection, Ukrainian-American Lyceum, Marhanets College, Pavlohrad Technical School and Motor Transport Technical School.

Currently there are 16,000 students enrolled on programs at the university, whilst post-graduate and doctoral students are taught in 27 modern specialities. The licensed number of student admissions for entering the university each year is 1,400 students. The academic process is provided by 600 teachers including more than 100 doctors of science, professors and 350 candidates of Science and associate professors. The infrastructure of the university (general area of constructions and buildings is 126049 square meters estimated at 29,8 mln. hryvnia cost), modern computer basis (more than 1000 modern computers) local and global computer nets, library funds with more than one million volumes, strong material and technical laboratory basis, ensures a high standard of education.

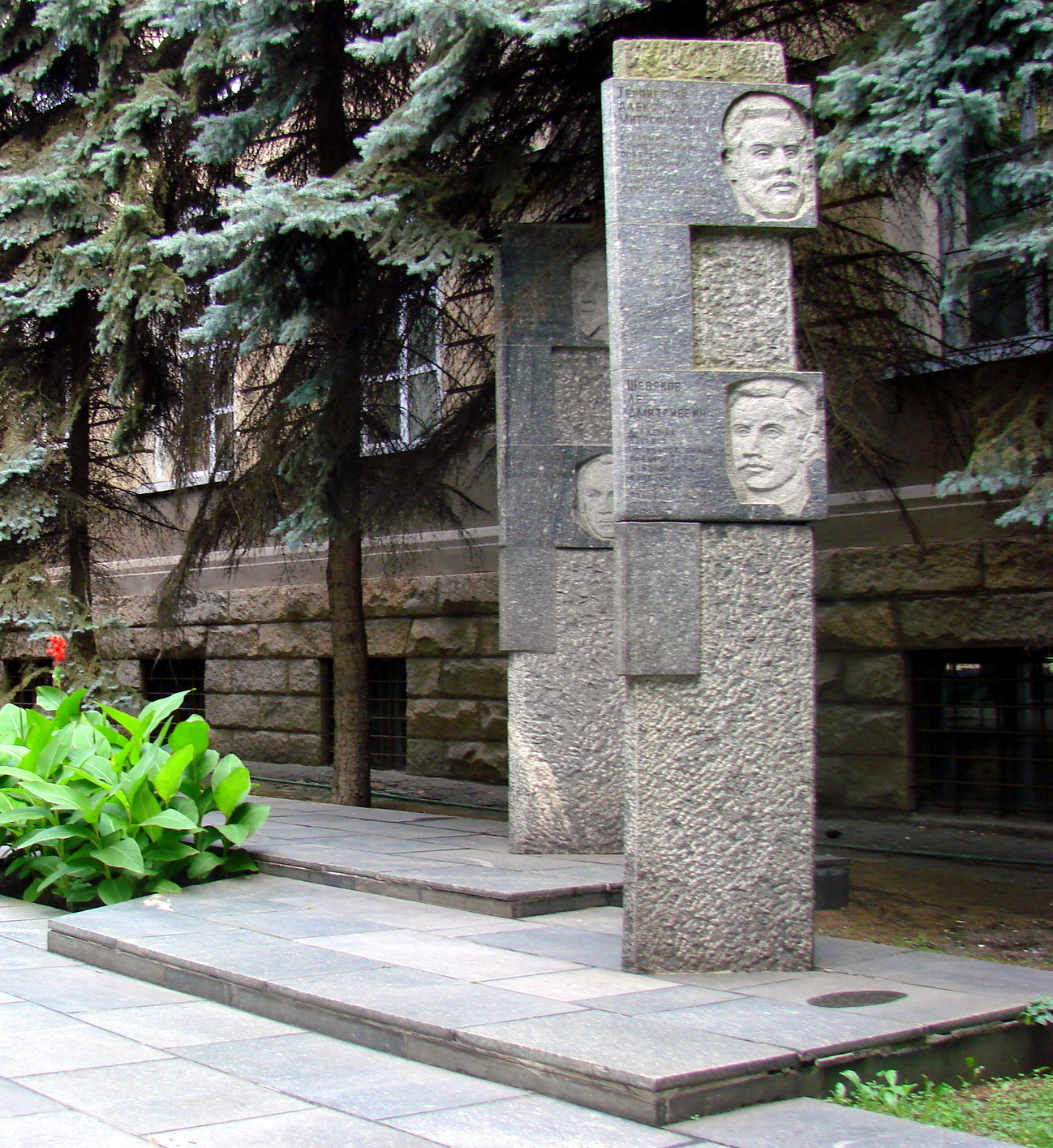
A monument to some of NMU's most outstanding alumni.

Over the 100 years of the university's existence more than 56,000 highly qualified specialists have been prepared, more than 500 monographs and 250 study-books widely known beyond Ukraine have been published, and about 150 Doctors of science and more than 1,750 Candidates of science have been trained. The university's graduates are today authors of more than 2600 inventions in foreign countries, where they obtained more than 300 patents. In recent years, four fundamental innovations of the university's scientists have been recognised as scientific discoveries.

== History ==
=== Foundation ===
The foundation ceremony of Ekaterinoslav's Higher Mining Technical School (EHMTS) was conducted on October 12, 1899, and in April of the next year construction of the institution's new educational buildings began. To begin with the Higher Mining Technical School had only two departments, those of mining and factory-production, but their academic curricula differed only very slightly (the main difference between the two faculties was to be found in the number of taught hours conducted for students).

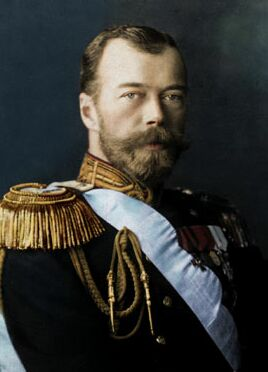
The Higher Mining Technical School was founded during the reign of Nicholas II.

The curriculum according to the "Regulation for the EHMTS" foresaw an initial total of 23 taught disciplines: theology, higher mathematics, analytical mechanics, construction mechanics, applied mechanics, mine-factory mechanics, physics, chemistry, electrical mechanics, mineralogy, geology and deposit science, geodesy, mining art, ore and coal dressing, surveying, metallurgy, technology of metals, design and geometric design, accounting and mine-factory economy, technical translation from German and French and first aid at accidents. The provision of training was undertaken by a total of 13 full-time employed teachers.

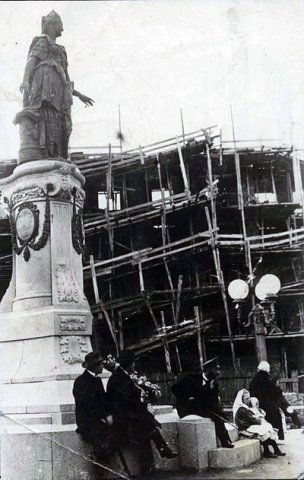
Construction of the Mining Institute in the late 1890s.

From the date of its founding the university was equipped with a two department library, a mineralogical museum, chemical, mechanical and probe laboratories, and offices for each discipline. Nevertheless, the Technical School had a lot of problems for a long time. Ten years after EHMTS establishment there were only 9 teachers, and the stable cadre was constantly decreasing. This made the issue of equalising the Technical School's rights with other higher educational institutions more urgent, and thus eventually the school was turned into the Ekaterinoslav Mining Institute. On June 19, 1912 the State Legislative body adopted a resolution on restructuring the EHMTS into a fully equipped Mining Institute. Since July 1 a number of outstanding scientists, mainly graduates from Saint-Petersburg Mining Institute, then joined the institute.

The institute became well known for its many publications in scientific periodicals. The EHMTS edited and produced the "News of Ekaterinoslav Higher Mining Technical School" since 1905 and up until 1917 the school published 23 collections of "News", in which around 500 scientific works were published (including monographs and study books).

=== The Soviet era ===
In 1918 the Mining Institute opened two new departments: surveying (closed in 1921) and Geological Prospecting, and obtained the right to award scientific degrees through public defence of a scientific dissertation. Later, in 1921 the Mechanical Faculty was created with two departments, those of Mining-Factory and Electrical Engineering. The implementation of new specialties was from then on dictated by industrial development. Finally a distance learning faculty was opened.

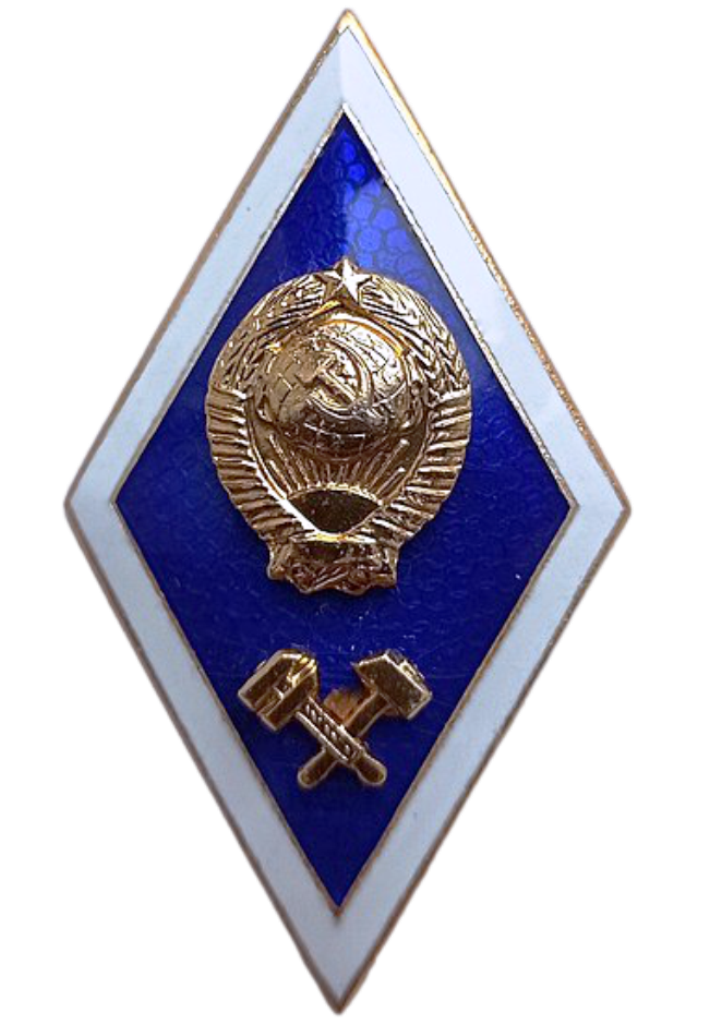
The model of breast badge awarded to graduates of the Mining Institute (and other engineering universities) during the Soviet era.

In 1930 the Mining Institute began training specialists only for the mining industry and geological prospecting works, and in 1932 a number of new faculties were established in place of the departments: Mining, Electrical Engineering, Geological-Surveying. In the 20s and 30s the process of forming scientific schools was continued, and therefore during the late 1930s the Mining Institute lost a significant part of its staff (about 30 persons, among which there were a number of outstanding professors), however, the institution withstood these losses and kept preparing highly professional specialists for industry and science.

As a result of the Second World War in 1941–1945 about 300 teachers, staff members and students left for the front within the first few days of hostilities commencing. The institute evacuated to Sverdlovsk and Karaganda, to where a significant part of its equipment was brought and where its faculty began to work alongside the scientific staff of the Sverdlovsk Mining Institute and the Filial of Moscow Mining Institute, which by that time had come to Karaganda too. A great number of the Mining Institute's staff occupied engineering positions at mining enterprises of the Urals and Soviet Republics of Middle Asia, working for victory over Nazi Germany.

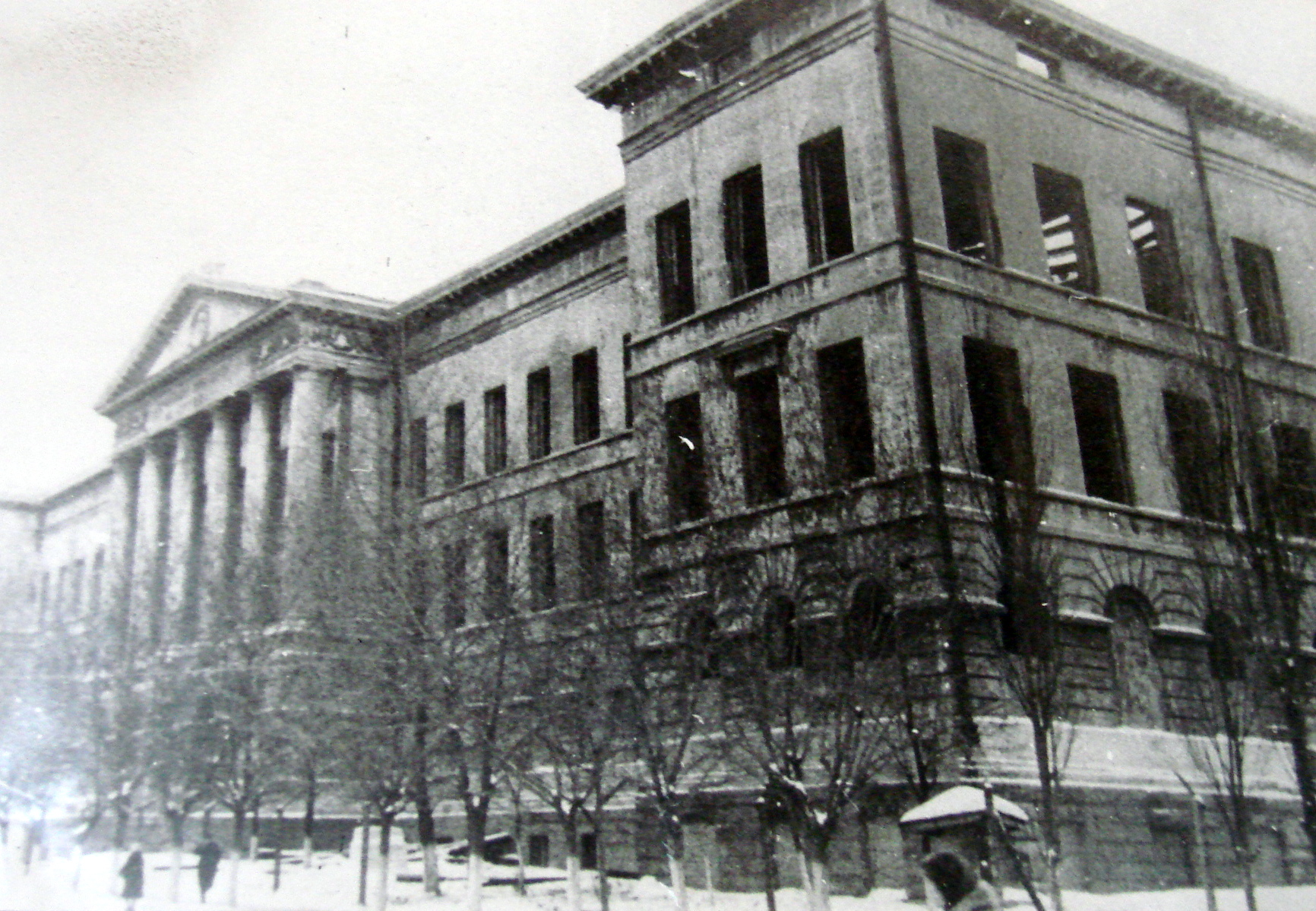
The remains of the Mining Institute, which was burnt-out by German forces during the Second World War.

The Institute finally resumed its teaching activities in 1943, first in Karaganda, and later in Dnipropetrovsk. However, after the German invasion of the USSR and later Lower Dnieper Offensive, many of the institute's buildings were in ruin and required extensive reconstruction before the staff was able to move its educational activities back into them. After the war, on November 21, 1949 the Mining Institute was awarded with the Order of the Red Banner and a number of its staff members received high state awards (26 orders and 17 medals) for scientific achievements and success in training engineering and technical staff for the national economy. By 1951/52 academic year all the buildings of the institute had been completely rebuilt, with a new experimental study range for boring, a geological museum, and new laboratories and dormitories being put into use. In 1951 the Mine-Construction Faculty was established.

By its 50th anniversary the Institute had 165 professors, associate professors and lecturers, 1,942 students, 34 departments, 22 laboratories, 25 cabinets, a geological museum, library, experimental study range and experimental workshops.

In 1970 the Mining Institute employed 474 teachers, including 34 professors. At that time the number of graduating engineers equalled 1,200 persons and the number of specialists studying in full-time education was increasing, although part-time and extramural study forms also functioned.

=== Post-Ukrainian independence ===
In May 1993 according to the results of State accreditation for higher educational institutes, the Mining Institute gained the status of an autonomous IV-accreditation level state higher educational institution and received the name of the State Mining Academy of Ukraine. In February 2002 the institution was finally restructured and became the "National Mining University"; around the same time it started to widen its academic offering. Finally, in 2018, the university adopted its current name, "Dnipro University of Technology", to reflect its widened technical curriculum which is no longer solely focussed on mining sciences. Today it is one of the leading higher educational institution of the country in geological prospecting and mining fields. In 2009 celebrations were held to mark the 110th anniversary of the university's foundation.

== Academics ==
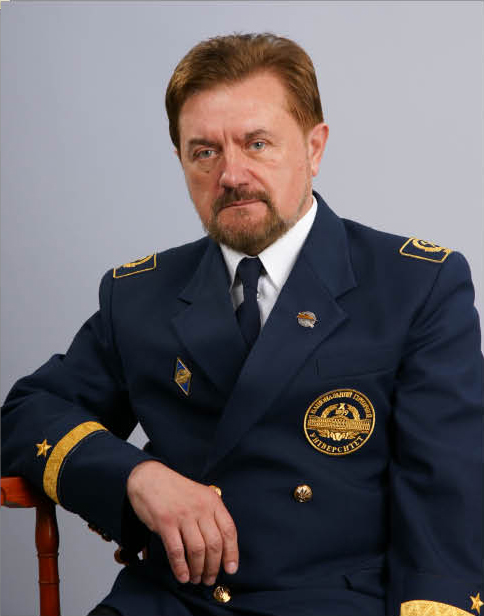
Bondarenko Volodymyr Illych, a professor at the polytechnic, in the institution's formal attire.

The university currently has 846 full-time professors, and employs 218 other full-time and part-time workers. Amongst the academic staff there are 179 full professors, 371 associate professors and a further 296 teachers lacking doctoral level degrees. This equates to around 65% of the university's academic staff being holders of doctor-ships. In addition to this, amongst the universities academics there are 34 members of the National Academy of Sciences of Ukraine, 11 laureates of the State Prize of Ukraine in Science and Technology, 11 'honoured scientists' of Ukraine and 11 'distinguished educators' of Ukraine.

=== Rankings ===
The polytechnic's placing in the annual rankings of universities in Ukraine:

| Ranking | 2007 | 2008 | 2009 | 2010 | 2011 |
|---|---|---|---|---|---|
| Compas | 6 | 6 | 6 | 6 | 6 |

== Departments and partner universities ==
=== Structure ===
The faculties of the university are:

- Institute of Power Engineering
- Institute of Economics
- Institute of Mining
- Faculty of Construction
- Faculty of Mechanical Engineering
- Faculty of Geological Prospecting
- Faculty of Law
- Institute of Extramural Learning
- Interbranch Institute of Continuing Learning

=== Foreign Partner universities ===
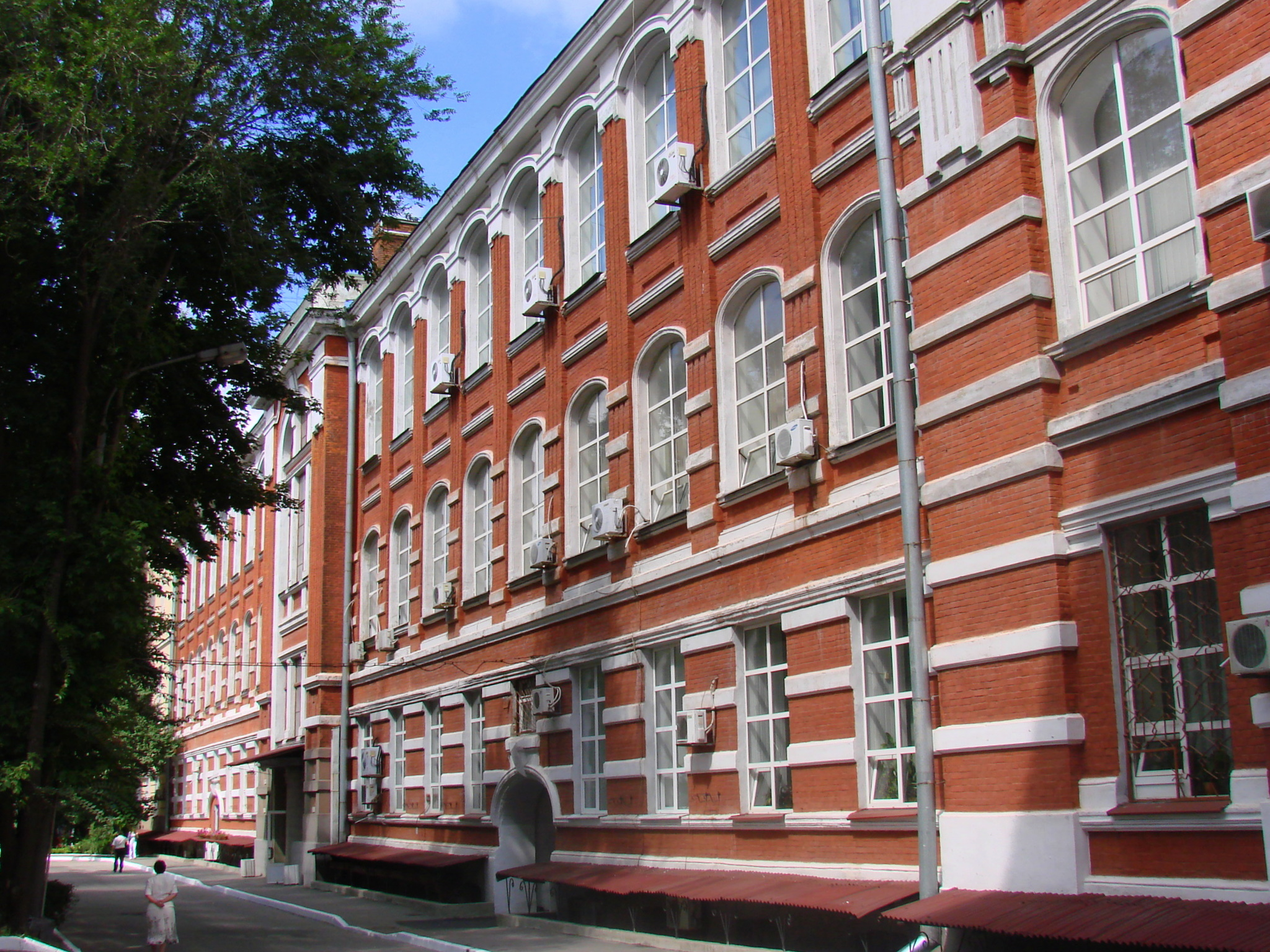
The rear of the university's largest academic building - (Main) Corpus No. 1.

| Country | University | Country | University |
|---|---|---|---|
| Austria | University of Leoben | Kazakhstan | Satbayev Kazakh National Technical University |
| Canada | Université Laval | Poland | AGH University of Science and Technology |
| Germany | Reutlingen University | Poland | Wrocław University of Technology |
| Germany | Freiberg University of Mining and Technology | Poland | Central Mining Institute, Katowice |
| Germany | Brandenburg University of Technology | | |
| Germany | Esslingen University of Applied Sciences | | |

== Campus ==
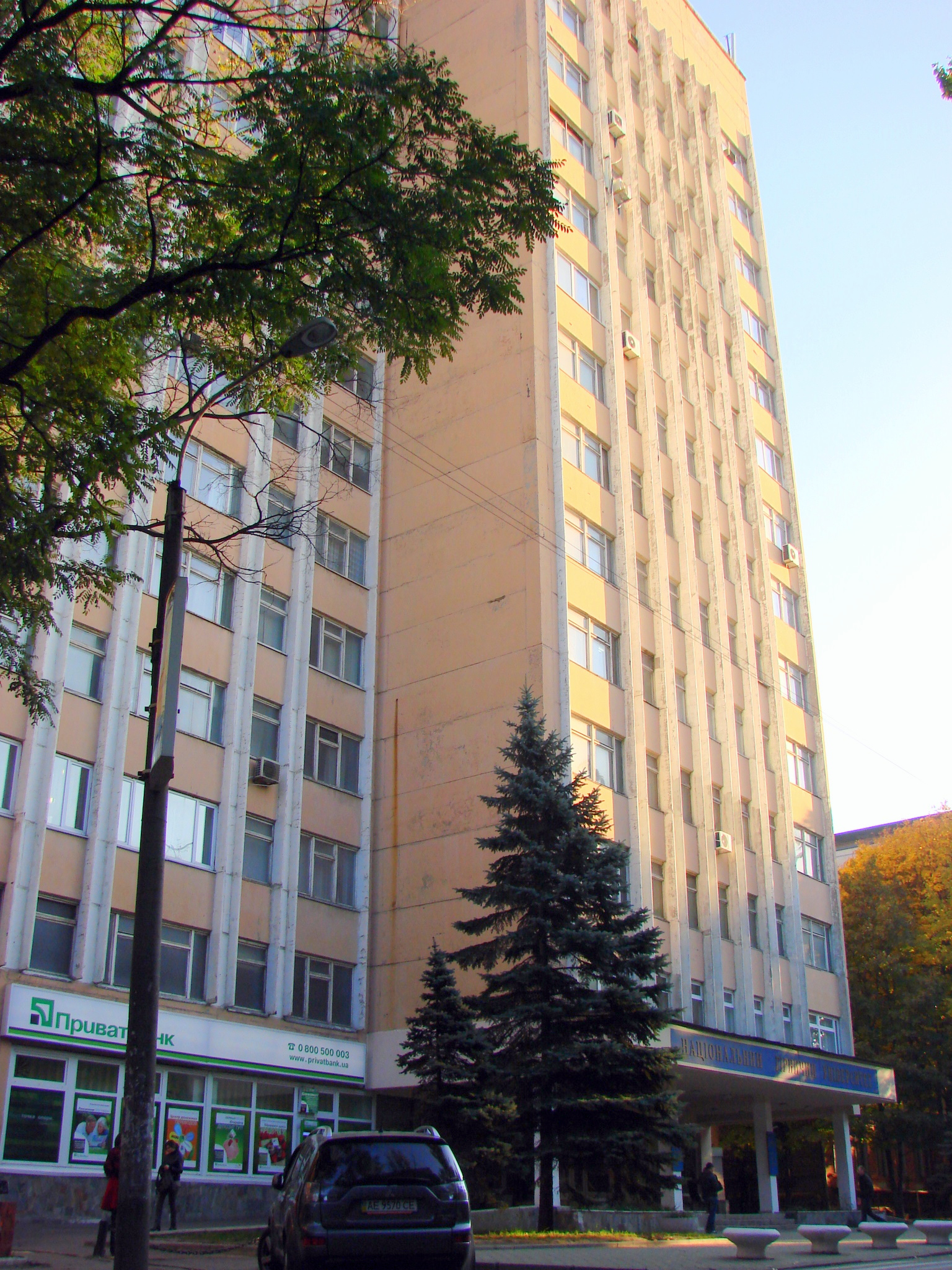
The university's 7th corpus.

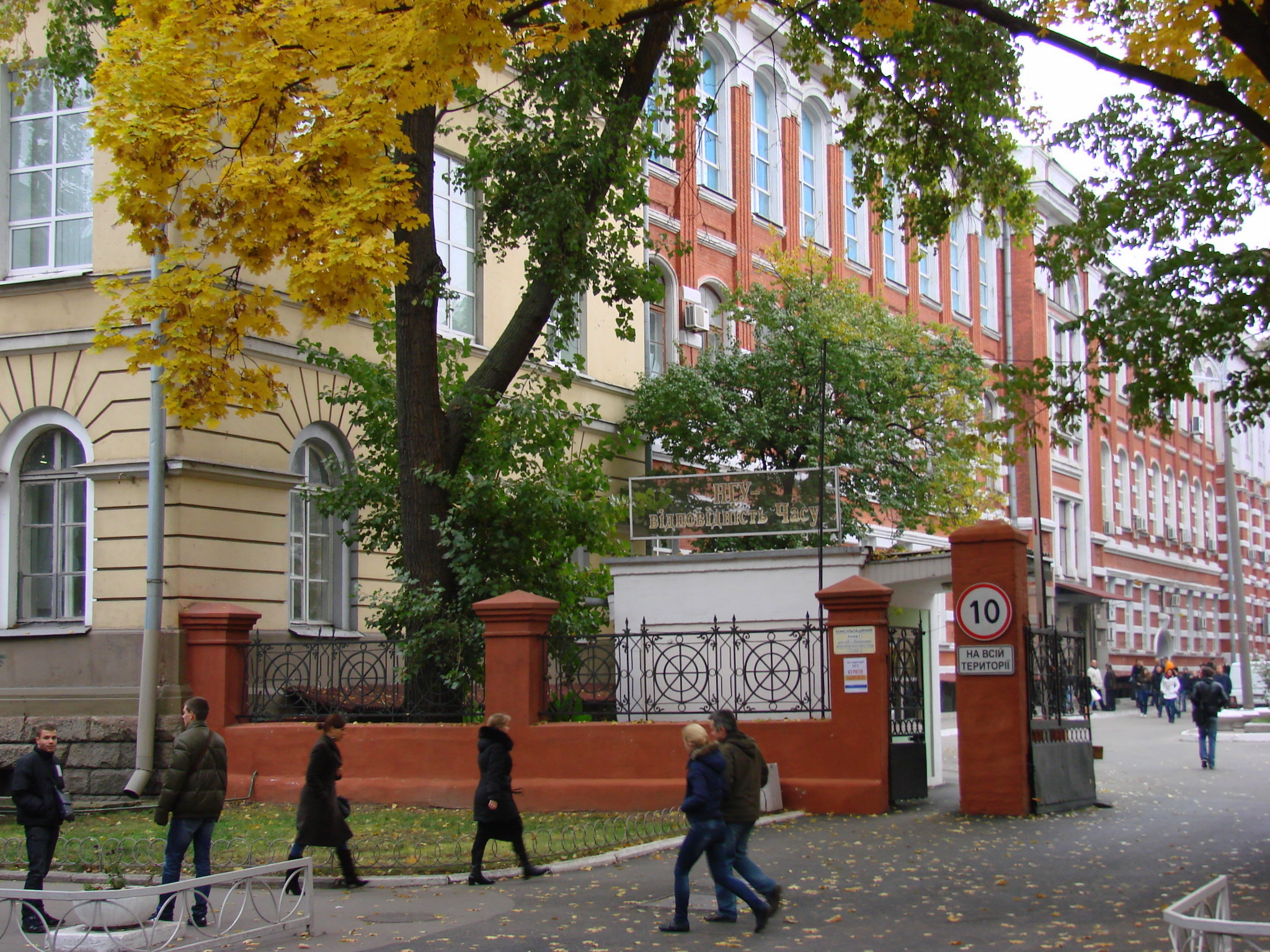
The rear of the main building and freight entrance to the university's grounds.

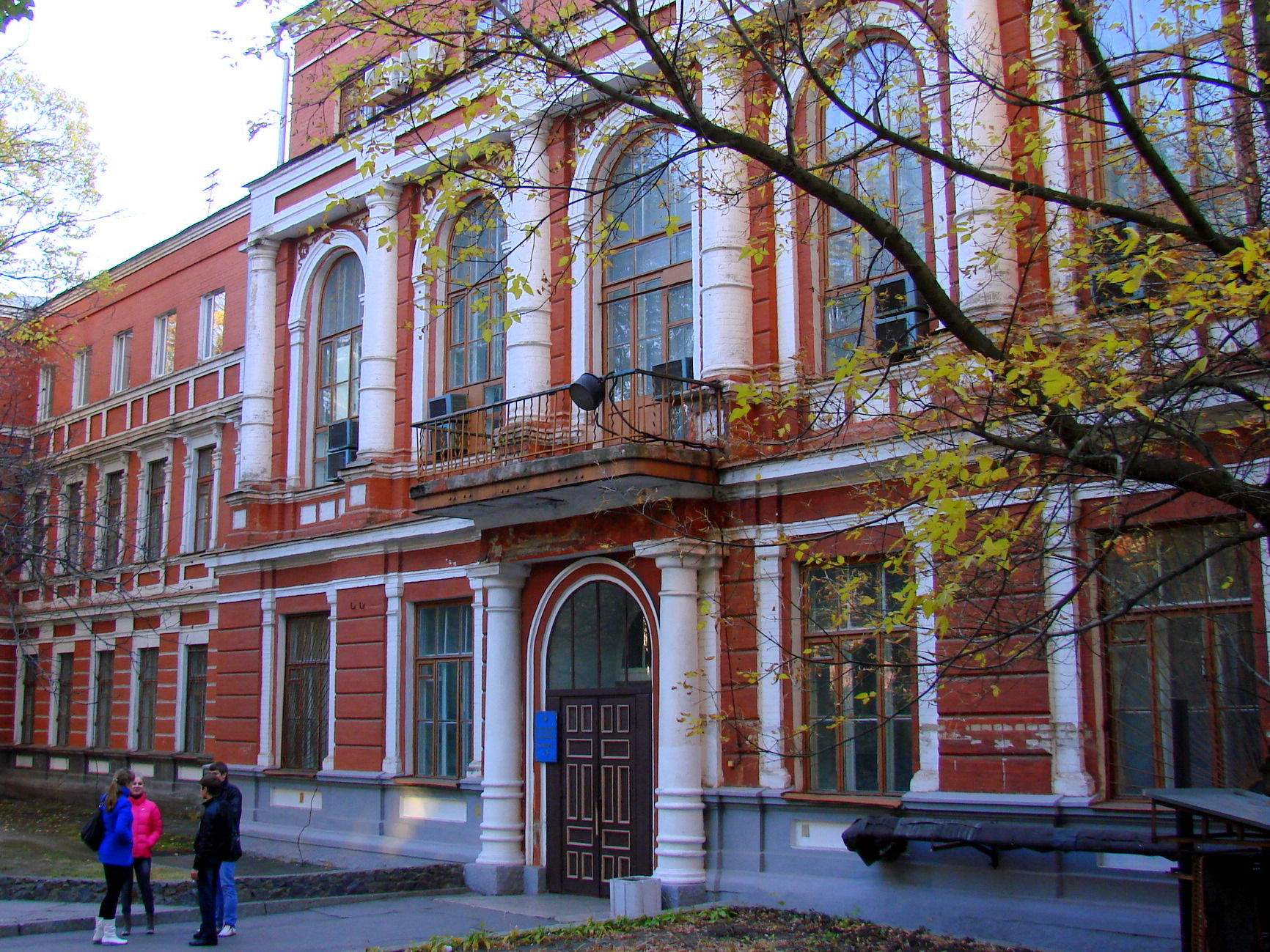
NMU's 3rd corpus, Dnipro's former No. 1 school for girls.

The Dnipro University of Technology is a primarily campus based university. Much of the university is located on a central site in the city of Dnipro, close to the municipal historical museum and scientific library. The main building (1st Corpus), built in 1899 is a protected monument of architecture; it is a large structure with a neo-classical front elevation which serves as the main entrance to the university's territory. Over the years the campus has developed with the addition of numerous new buildings. One of the first of these was the 2nd Corpus which was built specifically for the Mining School (originally as the School of Chemistry), whilst soon after the No. 1 municipal school for girls on Politseyska Street, was acquired for use as the institution's 3rd Corpus. Later, in the 1960s and 80s the university's fourth to tenth corpuses were built. There is no particularly dominant architectural style present amongst the university's buildings other than the Russian interpretation of 19th century neo-classicalism which defines the pre-Soviet era structures present on the territory of the university. The university's 7th Corpus, a large 14 story constructivist building built in the 1970s, was built on a site just slightly to the east of the crossing of Olesya Honchara Street and Shevchenko Street (formerly Politseyska), thus dividing Shevchenko Street into two sections and enclosing the section from O. Hochara Street to Gagarin Street within the grounds of the polytechnic. The university's sport's facilities are located in and around the 6th corpus, which is also located on the grounds of the university.

The university's admissions department is located in the 4th corpus, to the side of the main building. In addition to the academic facilities located on the main campus, the university also owns a number of student hostels, one of which (Hostel No. 1) is located just across from the university on Olesya Honchara Street.

Within the immediate vicinity of the university's campus a number of important institutions can be found. Amongst others these include the Prydniprovska State Academy of Civil Engineering and Architecture, the National Metallurgical Academy of Ukraine, Dnipro State Hospital for Students, Mechnikov Regional Hospital, Dnipro State Medical Academy and the Ukrainian State Chemical-Technological University. There are also a number of shopping centres in the area. The university is well connected to the city's public transport network (by tram No. 1 and various bus routes) and it is expected that by 2024 the Muzeina station (currently under construction) of the Dnipro Metro will connect the university are to the larger Western area of Dnipro and its many residential neighbourhoods.

=== Museums and collections ===
The polytechnic is currently home to two museums. These museums are entirely run by the institution's staff and students and are funded from its budget; the collections are expanded with the help of donors and items which are taken on loan. The two museums are both currently located in the main building (1st Corpus) of NMU on Dmytro Yavornytsky Prospekt.

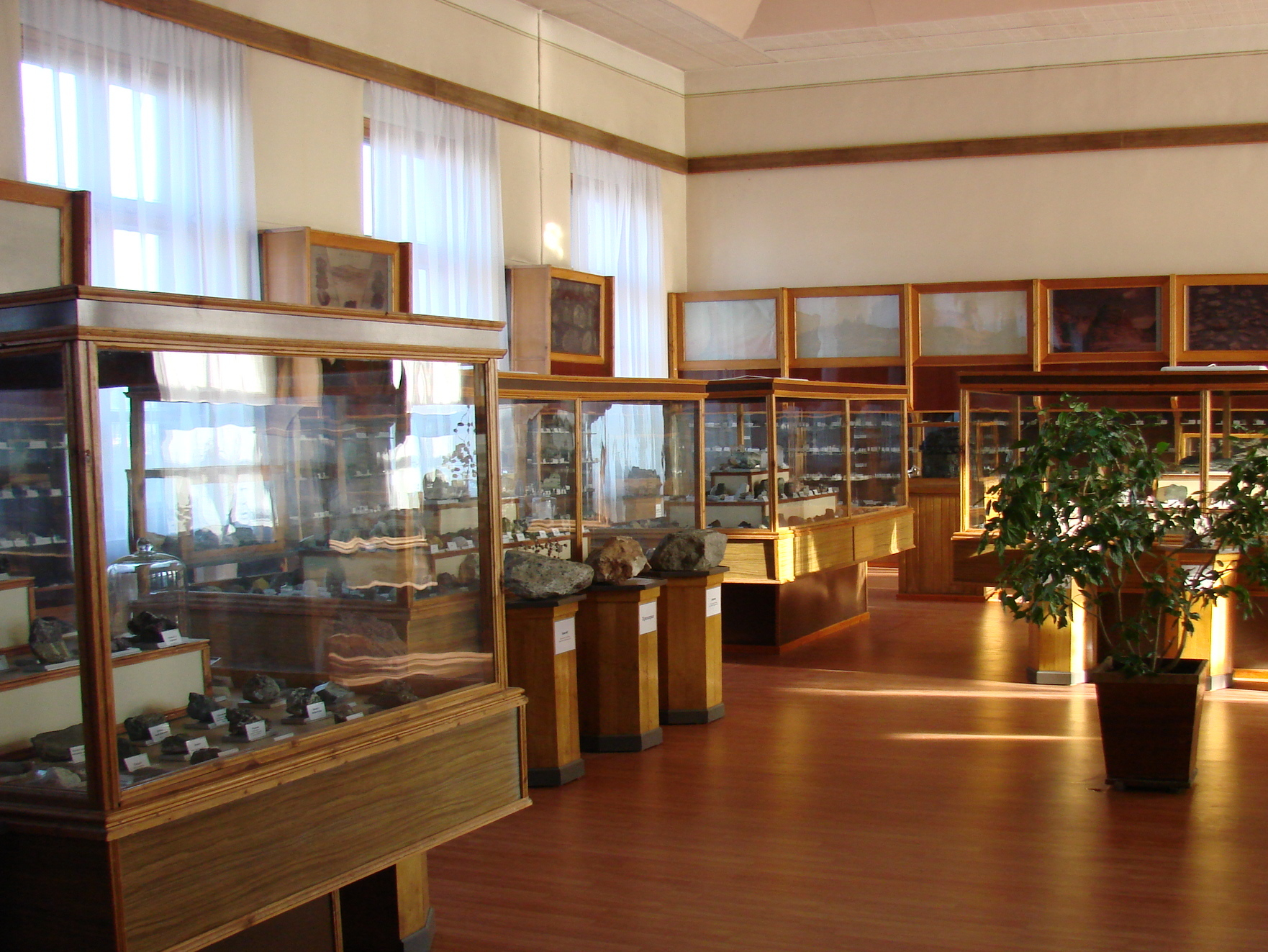
The university's museum of geology and mineralogy

- Alexander Pol University Historical Museum – This museum was organised in the early 1970s and opened its doors on 12 October 1974 when the university was still known as the Dnipropetrovsk Mining Institute. Its subject material covers the entire history of the institution from its foundation in 1899 to the present day, and has a number of exhibits relating to the way in which students studied and were taught over the years. The Historical Museum is also devoted to recording the changes made to the university's property over the years; to that end it maintains a large collection of photographs detailing the construction, destruction and remodelling undertaken at the university over its lifetime.
- Museum of Geology and Mineralogy – Opened 19 August 1935, the university's museum of geology and mineralogy is one of the largest of its kind in Europe. However, during the course of World War II it suffered greatly and lost all but 10 items of its 20,000-piece collection. After the war, the reconstruction of the collection took around 11 years and the museum was not reopened until 1955. The exposition contains about 3,000 exhibits, its area is over 350 square metres (3,800 sq ft), and there are 44 glass cases and 45 separate rests for samples in it. There are three main subsections of the museum, made up of: Mineralogy, Crystallography and Petrography, Historical Mineralogy and Paleontology, and finally Useful Minerals. Nowadays over 19,500 objects of interest from all around the world constitute the museum's collection, and it is visited by around 5,000 people annually.

== Student life ==
=== Student accommodation ===
The polytechnic owns a number of hostels for the use of its students who wish to live on or near the grounds and facilities of the university. The capacity of the six combined hostels amounts to around 3,050, with Hostel No. 6 being the largest and catering for the greatest number of students. However demand for places in the university's hostels is often very high, making it impossible to house all the students who wish to live in them. Advantages of living in the university's accommodation are largely centred around the low (rental) cost of living there.

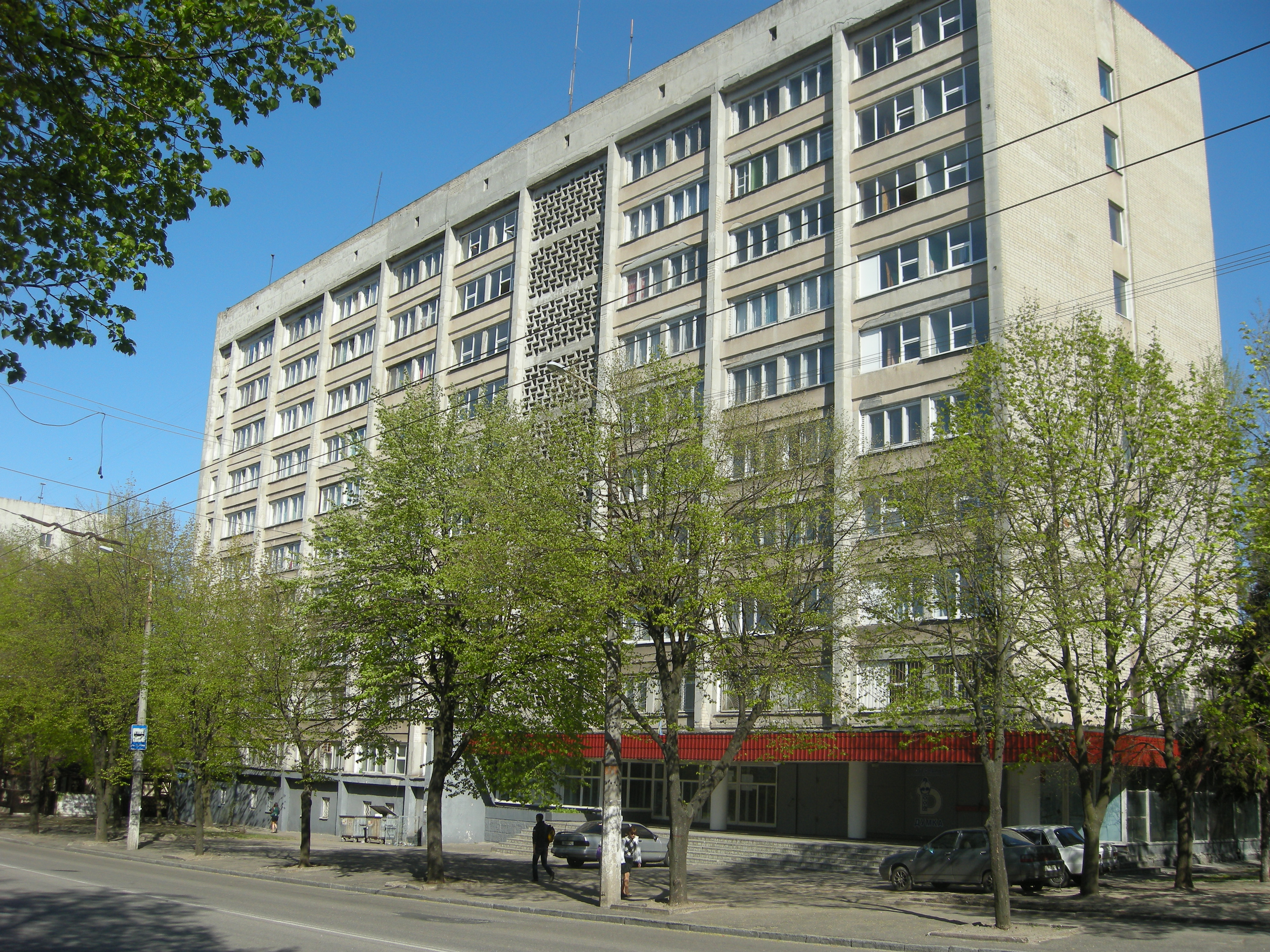
Hostel № 3 on Gagarin Prospekt

Current hostels owned by the university are located at the following addresses:

- Hostel № 1 – Dmytro Yavornytsky Prospekt, 21
- Hostel № 2 – Dmytro Yavornytsky Prospekt, 17
- Hostel № 3 – Gagarin Prospekt, 61
- Hostel № 4 – Gagarin Prospekt, 59
- Hostel № 5 – Gagarin Prospekt, 57
- Hostel № 6 – Oleksandr Pol Prospekt, 111-б

== Notable alumni ==
=== Heads and ministers of state, government and international organisations ===
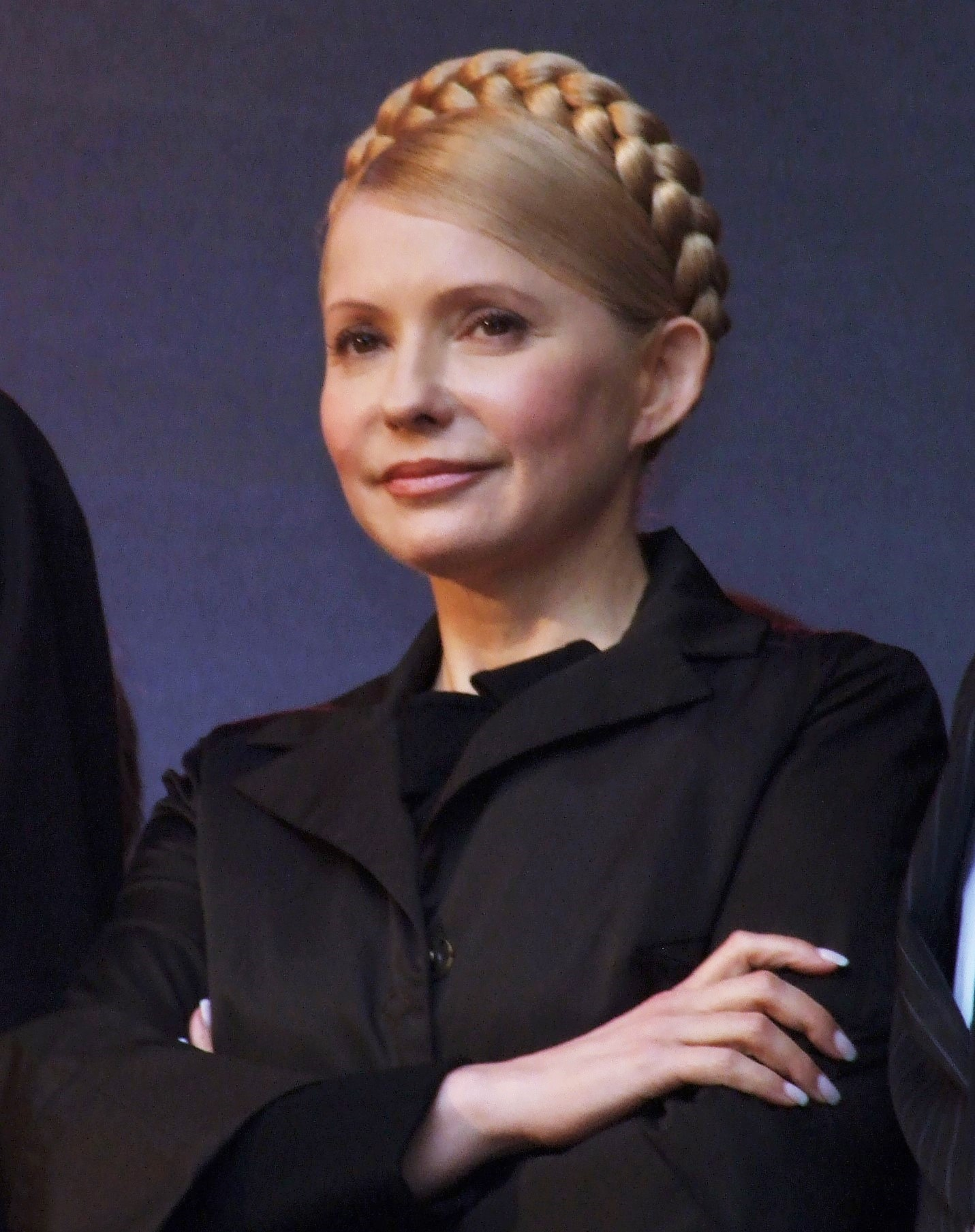
Yulia Tymoshenko

| State/Government | Name | Office |
|---|---|---|
| Ukraine | Vitold Fokin | First post-independence Prime Minister of Ukraine (1990–1992) |
| Ukraine | Yulia Tymoshenko | Twice Prime Minister of Ukraine (2005, 2007–2010) and Orange Revolution leader |
| Ukraine | Oleksandr Turchynov | President of Ukraine (2014) |
| China | Zhu Xun (朱训) | Minister of Geology of the People's Republic of China (1985–1994) |
| Moldova | Vladimir Molozhen | Deputy Minister of Internal Affairs, Minister for Information Technology and Telecommunications of Moldova |

=== Academics and other alumni ===
- Volodymyr Biletskyy – Ukrainian scientist, politician, activist, Doctor of Technical Sciences, professor, member of the Academy of Economic Sciences of Ukraine, Ukrainian Academy of Mining Sciences, Shevchenko Scientific Society, and a researcher in coal mining, the initiator, science editor and project manager of Mining Encyclopedia (1998–2011)

== See also ==
List of universities in Ukraine
