= Matviivka rural hromada =

Coordinates: 47°53′N 35°23′E

Matviivka rural hromada Матвіївська селищна громада
- Hromada
- Interactive map of Matviivka rural hromada
- Country: Ukraine
- Oblast: Zaporizhzhia Oblast
- Raion: Zaporizhzhia Raion

Area
  - Total: 153.6 km^{2} (59.3 sq mi)

Population (2020)
  - Total: 6,872
  - Density: 44.74/km^{2} (115.9/sq mi)
- Settlements: 12
- Rural settlements: 1
- Villages: 10
- Towns: 1

Matviivka rural hromada (Ukrainian: Матвіївська селищна громада) is a hromada of Ukraine, located in Zaporizhzhia Raion, Zaporizhzhia Oblast. Its administrative center is the village of Matviivka.

It has an area of 153.6 square kilometres (59.3 mi^{2}) and a population of 6,872, as of 2020.

The hromada contains 12 settlements, including the town Kamiane, the rural-type settlement Hasanivka, and 10 villages:

- Bekarivka
- Druzheliubivka
- Kupriianivka
- Mala Kupriianivka
- Matviivka
- Novoivanivske
- Novosofiivka
- Troiandy
- Ukrainka
- Yakovleve

== See also ==
- List of hromadas of Ukraine
