= Geology of Ukraine =

The geology of Ukraine is the regional study of rocks, minerals, tectonics, natural resources and groundwater in Ukraine. The oldest rocks in the region are part of the Ukrainian Shield and formed more than 2.5 billion years ago in the Archean eon of the Precambrian. Extensive tectonic evolution and numerous orogeny mountain-building events fractured the crust into numerous block, horsts, grabens and depressions. Ukraine was intermittently flooded as the crust downwarped during much of the Paleozoic, Mesozoic and early Cenozoic, before the formation of the Alps and Carpathian Mountains defined much of its current topography and tectonics. Ukraine was impacted by the Pleistocene glaciations within the last several hundred thousand years. The country has numerous metal deposits as well as minerals, building stone and high-quality industrial sands.

== Stratigraphy, tectonics and geologic history ==
In the Early Archean, the oldest granite layer that now form the Precambrian crystalline basement rock of Ukraine began to form. These rocks, including plagioclase granite, basalt and gneiss, was reworked into granulite belts due to tectonic evolution in the Archean. The Late Archean was marked by the deposition of ancient greywacke, charnockite and basic eruptions from numerous volcanoes and fumaroles.

=== Proterozoic (1.5 billion-539 million years ago) ===
Tectonic forces had fractured the Archean basement rock into sutures, blocks, troughs and depressions by the start of the Proterozoic, although new folding began. The evolution of the rock units in the Proterozoic produced the stable Ukrainian Shield, which was broken up further into horst and graben formations by the Baikalian orogeny. During the Riphean period, a delineation of Eastern European stratigraphy, the Dnieper-Donets Rift began to form.

=== Paleozoic (539-251 million years ago) ===
In the Paleozoic, the Volyn-Podolia region and southern Ukraine subsided and were flooded by a marine transgression, which immersed the region until the Devonian (or until the Permian further south). Ukraine experienced volcanic activity related to the Caledonian orogeny. The Lvov-Volyn Depression developed in the Volyn-Podolia Platform during the Devonian and Carboniferous.

Further tectonic changes came about with the Hercynian orogeny, beginning the formation of the Prichernomorian Depression. Basalt and alkaline volcanic rocks intruded the Dnieper-Donets rift zone during this time and the Dnieper-Donets Depression and Donets Basin formed. These syncline structures were flooded by the sea in the Middle Devonian.

In the late Paleozoic, from the Permian into the Triassic, dry land continental conditions returned.

=== Mesozoic (251-66 million years ago) ===
Much of the Ukrainian Shield was flooded during the Cimmerian orogeny as a large anticline formed. The crust downwarped in the Dnieper-Donets Depression and Donets Basin and deeper seas penetrated further inland during the Jurassic. Faults formed as the Alps began to build, together with the Carpathian Mountains, separating much of Ukraine from the Precarpathian Foredeep and Transcarpathian Depression. The central Ukrainian Shield was flooded during the Cretaceous.

=== Cenozoic (66 million years ago-present) ===
In the Cenozoic an overall uplift of the region led to the retreat of seas to the north, with the exception of a transgression during the Eocene. Marine basins finally retreated entirely in the Oligocene. A meganticlinorium had formed in Crimea by the end of the Oligocene. During the Pleistocene in the recent geologic past, much of Ukraine was covered with glaciers with the exception of areas around the Sea of Azov and Black Sea which were flooded during the time period.

== Natural resource geology ==
The Proterozoic Ukrainian Shield hosts iron ore deposits in the Krivorozhsky Basin, while iron ore is also found in the Neogene Prichernomorian Depression. Manganese ores are known from Oligocene rocks in the south slope of the Ukrainian shield and titanium is found in magmatic and alluvial deposits. Tungsten, molybdenum, vanadium, nickel, cobalt and chromium occur on the shield as well. Mercury deposits in the Donets Basin are hosted in Carboniferous sandstones as well as in the Transcarpathian Trough and Crimea (lead-zinc-gold mineralization are also found, while copper is found in Permian rocks in the Donets Basin).

Geologists have discovered oil and gas deposits in the Neogene of the Precarpathian Foredeep, the Paleozoic of the Dnieper-Donets Depression and in the Oligocene of the Prichernomorian Depression. Large coal reserves are situated in the Dnieper Lignite Basin, Donets Basin and Lvov-Volyn Depression. Additionally, Ukraine has combustible black shale and peat deposits.

The construction industry often quarries Precambrian granite from the Ukraine Shield, while chemical industries extract rock salt, talc, mica, feldspar and glass-grade sand.

== Sources ==
- Moores, E.M.; Fairbridge, Rhodes W. (1997). Encyclopedia of European & Asian Regional Geology. Springer.
