= Kopani, Orikhiv urban hromada, Polohy Raion, Zaporizhzhia Oblast =

Village in Zaporizhzhia Oblast, Ukraine

Kopani Копані
- Village
- Interactive map of Kopani
- Location of Kopani in Zaporizhzhia Oblast Kopani (Ukraine)
- Coordinates: 47.453549°N 35.733062°E
- Country: Ukraine
- Oblast: Zaporizhzhia Oblast
- Raion: Polohy Raion
- Founded Status: 1851

Area
  - Total: 6.12 km^{2} (2.36 sq mi)
- Elevation: 137 m (449 ft)

Population (2001 census)
  - Total: 616
  - Density: 101/km^{2} (261/sq mi)
- Time zone: UTC+2 (EET)
  - Summer (DST): UTC+3 (EEST)
- Postal code: 70562
- Area code: +380 6141

Kopani (Ukrainian: Копані) is a village in Polohy Raion (district) in Zaporizhzhia Oblast of southern Ukraine, at about 62.1 kilometres (38.6 mi) southeast of the centre of Zaporizhzhia city. It belongs to Orikhiv urban hromada, one of the hromadas of Ukraine. Nearby villages are Nesterianka to the northwest and Robotyne to the east.

== History ==
Kopani was founded in 1851 under the Russian Empire.

=== Russo-Ukrainian War ===
Shortly before the start of the Battle of Orikhiv on 8 May 2022, during the Russia invasion of Ukraine; the village came under Russian occupation. In the summer of 2023, Ukrainian forces launched a counteroffensive in the region; however, it fell short of its objective and did not reach Kopani. In May 2024, positional fighting was still ongoing in and around Robotyne, a hamlet just east of Kopani.
