= Piatykhatky, Zaporizhzhia Oblast =

Village in Zaporizhzhia Oblast, Ukraine

Piatykhatky П'ятихатки
- Village
- Interactive map of Piatykhatky
- Location of Piatykhatky in Zaporizhzhia Oblast Piatykhatky (Zaporizhzhia Oblast)
- Coordinates: 47.507889°N 35.461482°E
- Country: Ukraine
- Oblast: Zaporizhzhia Oblast
- Raion: Vasylivka
- Founded: 1890

Area
  - Total: 27.88 km^{2} (10.76 sq mi)
- Elevation: 50 m (160 ft)

Population (2001 census)
  - Total: 301
  - Density: 10.8/km^{2} (28.0/sq mi)
- Time zone: UTC+2 (EET)
  - Summer (DST): UTC+3 (EEST)
- Postal code: 71621
- Area code: +380 6175

Piatykhatky (Ukrainian: П'ятиха́тки, [pjɐtɪˈxɑtkɪ]; Russian: Пятихатки, lit. 'five houses') is a village in Vasylivka Raion (district) in Zaporizhzhia Oblast of southern Ukraine, at about 44.66 kilometres (27.75 mi) southeast by east (SEbE) from the centre of Zaporizhzhia city. It belongs to Stepnohirsk settlement hromada, one of the hromadas of Ukraine.

== History ==
=== Russo-Ukrainian War ===
The settlement came under attack by Russian forces in 2022, during the Russian invasion of Ukraine, and was liberated by Ukrainian forces on June 19, 2023, during the larger 2023 Ukrainian counteroffensive. The North Ossetian volunteer battalion Storm Ossetia, was encircled and severely destroyed. Its deputy commander killed. Another volunteer detachment "Alania" also suffered serious losses in manpower. A video of Ukrainian soldiers of 128th Mountain Assault Brigade was shown and under their feet was the banner of the Ossetian battalion, probably captured during retaking the village. The village was once again captured by Russian forces by 25 March 2025.

== Demographics ==
As of the 2001 Ukrainian census, the village had a population of 301 inhabitants. The linguistic composition of the population was as follows:

Native languages in Piathykhatky
	percent
Ukrainian	91.4%
Russian	8.6%
others	0.0%
