= Novomaiorske =

Village in Donetsk Oblast, Ukraine

Novomaiorske Новомайорське
- Village
- Interactive map of Novomaiorske
- Location of Novomaiorske in Donetsk Oblast Novomaiorske (Ukraine)
- Coordinates: 47.735°N 37.037778°E
- Country: Ukraine
- Oblast: Donetsk Oblast
- Raion: Volnovakha Raion
- Hromada: Staromlynivka rural hromada

Area
  - Total: 0.737 km^{2} (0.285 sq mi)
- Elevation: 139 m (456 ft)

Population (2001 census)
  - Total: 551
  - Density: 748/km^{2} (1,940/sq mi)
- Time zone: UTC+2 (EET)
  - Summer (DST): UTC+3 (EEST)
- Postal code: 85561
- Area code: +380 6243

Novomaiorske (Ukrainian: Новомайорське; Russian: Новомайорское) is a village in Volnovakha Raion (district) in Donetsk Oblast of eastern Ukraine, at about 64.95 kilometres (40.36 mi) southwest by west of the centre of Donetsk city. It belongs to Staromlynivka rural hromada, one of the hromadas of Ukraine.

== History ==
The village came under attack and was occupied by Russian forces in 2022, during the Russian invasion of Ukraine, and was regained by Ukrainian forces by the beginning of August the same year. On 5 September 2023, during the 2023 Ukrainian counteroffensive, Ukrainian marine units of 37th Marine Brigade supported by artillery and armored vehicles advanced from north and successfully forded the Shaitanka river, suffering no losses. A few days later they captured the first houses on the outskirts of the village pushing Russian brigades of 37th Rifle, 40th Naval and DPR units back to at least the center of the settlement.

== See also ==
- Maiorske
- Staromaiorske
