= Shaitanka (river) =

River in Ukraine

Coordinates: 47°50′06″N 36°49′44″E

The Shaitanka or Shaytanka (Ukrainian: Шайтанка) is a river in southeastern Ukraine. A right tributary of the Mokri Yaly, it flows through the western parts of Donetsk Oblast near the settlements Novodonetske and Novomaiorske.

During the 2023 Ukrainian counteroffensive of the Russian invasion of Ukraine, the Shaitanka has become a site of fighting, with Ukrainian forces making concerted efforts to cross the river in September 2023.
