= Battle of Artemivsk =

2014 engagement during the war in Donbas

- Part of the War in Donbas during the Russo–Ukrainian War
Date	12 April – 6 July 2014 (2 months, 3 weeks and 3 days)
Location	Artemivsk, Donetsk Oblast, Ukraine
Result	Ukrainian victory

Belligerents
Ukraine	Donetsk People’s Republic

Commanders and leaders
Oleksandr Trepak	Unknown

Units involved
3rd Special Purpose Regiment	

Casualties and losses
67 killed	350 killed

The Battle of Artemivsk was a 2014 battle fought in the city of Artemivsk (historically and since 2016 known as Bakhmut) during the war in Donbas in eastern Ukraine as part of the wider Russo-Ukrainian War. It involved armed confrontation between the Special Operations Forces of Ukraine and the National Guard of Ukraine against pro-Russian militias fighting for the Donetsk People’s Republic.

== Background ==
In the aftermath of Euromaidan, from March to May 2014, pro-Russian unrest occurred in many cities of the eastern, central, and southern regions Ukraine. The demonstrations were encouraged by the Russian annexation of Crimea. The protests, known as the "Russian Spring" in Russia, took place under Russian flags and with pro-Russian slogans, and put forward a wide range of demands in reaction to the pro-European outlook of the new Ukrainian government – from the federalization of Ukraine to calls for the division of the territory of Ukraine and for annexation by Russia, in a similar fashion to that of Crimea.

=== Pro-Russian protests ===
On 1 March 2014, the first pro-Russian rally took place in the city. The organizers of the rally sounded openly separatist calls for unification with Russia and demanded a referendum be held. On the same day, the Russian flag was raised over the city council building.

Similar rallies continued until the second half of April 2014. The pro-Russian rhetoric and slogans did not change, but the number of participants in the demonstrations gradually became fewer and fewer. On 13 April 2014, the Ukrainian authorities launched an "anti-terrorist operation" to restore control over the Donetsk region, including the city of Artemivsk.

Ukrainian authorities organised the removal of weapons from military warehouses in early March 2014 to prevent armed conflict in the area.

== Timeline ==
=== April ===
On 7 April, Ukrainian symbols were removed from the Artemivsk City Council building.

On 12 April, the authorities of the Donetsk People's Republic in Artemivsk were declared separatists by the Ukrainian government. The pro-Russian authorities in Donetsk Oblast anticipated a repetition of the annexation of Crimea, although this did not come.

On 19 April, the forces of the 3rd Special Purpose Regiment reinforced the garrison of the small arms storage arsenal in the village of Paraskoviivka.

Oleksandr Trepak, together with several reconnaissance groups, went to the Artemivsk area. Together with Special Purpose Units of the Military Law Enforcement Service, Kirovohrad (now Kropvynytskyi) residents guarded the Center for Armored Weapons Provision, located in Artemvisk (1282nd Center for providing armored weapons and equipment – Unit A2730) and the base for storing small arms in the village of Paraskoviivka (Unit A-4176).

On 24 April, the first assault by separatists on the military unit located in Artemivsk took place, although this was unsuccessful.

=== May ===
On 25 May, separatists succeeded in disrupting the holding of the 2014 Ukrainian presidential election in the city.

=== June ===
On 7 June, Volodymyr Chobotka, the commander of the armored forces base, was wounded and taken prisoner in the city. Pekar's group of 6 people left in a white civilian van to get him after the alarm was raised. A group of militants drove off to meet them in a similar-looking civilian car. The deputy commander of the group of the 3rd regiment with the call sign, Merzavchik, was the first to orientate himself – the militants' car was shot by machine guns. In a few seconds, three militants were killed, one was wounded and one was captured. Among the militants killed was Veles, the "commandant of the city of Artemivsk". Pekar's group took away the weapons and documents of the militants.

A reconnaissance group of 8 special forces soldiers began an operation to search for and evacuate an seriously wounded officer. For this, it was necessary to seize a separatist checkpoint at the entrance to the city and hold it for around 3 hours to allow another group to evacuate a wounded man by helicopter. During the battle, the commander of the unit, Oleksandr Trepak, received a gunshot wound to the leg, but he refused to evacuate and for two days led the repulse of the militants' attacks on the Central Artillery Armament Base.

We well understood that the Russian mercenaries would try to take possession of armored vehicles and small arms, so we prepared reliable posts and secrets, morally prepared for the meeting of the "guests".

On 20 June, a second assault by separatists took place on a military unit located in the city. Special forces repelled an attack on Ukrainian warehouses from Horlivka with the help of grenade launchers. The next offensive took place with the support of mortar fire, the T-64 tank and infantry went on the offensive, but this attempt was also unsuccessful. Ukrainian soldiers suppressed the mortar, cut off the infantry and hit the enemy's combat vehicle.

The battles for military warehouses in Artemivsk became one of the first cases of the use of T-64 tanks by pro-Russian militants. During this time, the defenders of the base first learned about the presence of T-64 tanks in the armed forces during the night, from 20 to 21 June, when a tank fired at the ATP building adjacent to the military part. After this incident, the Ukrainian military decided to step up and "reanimated" one T-64 and one BMP-2 from those in storage (a total of 260 T-64, T-80 and T-72 tanks, 270 armored personnel carriers, 227 BMPs, 129 BRM-1K).

The day after the attack on the checkpoint No. 1 Ribgosp, on 27 June 2014, pro-Russian militants carried out a large-scale third attack on the base. At night, they fired on military units stationed in the city using grenade launchers and small arms. Among the equipment they used was a T-64BV tank. Defenders of the base fired at it RPG-18 and RPG-22, but failed to beat it and the tank was able to leave the scene of the battle alone. At the same time, the military unit A-4176 was stormed, where as a result of the battle, the T-64BV of pro-Russian militants was lined up and captured. The tank removed from the militants was checked for affiliation: the serial was not in the register of Ukrainian tanks, and the installed battery belonged 205th Separate Motor Rifle Brigade (Budionnovsk, Stavropol region, RF). It was one of three tanks in the arms of Russian Separatists spotted by the media at the time.

On 30 June, pro-Russian separatists launched a fourth attack on a military unit located in the city.

=== July ===
In early July, pro-Russian militants retreated from the city and on 5 July 2014, Artemivsk was returned to Ukrainian control.

== Losses ==
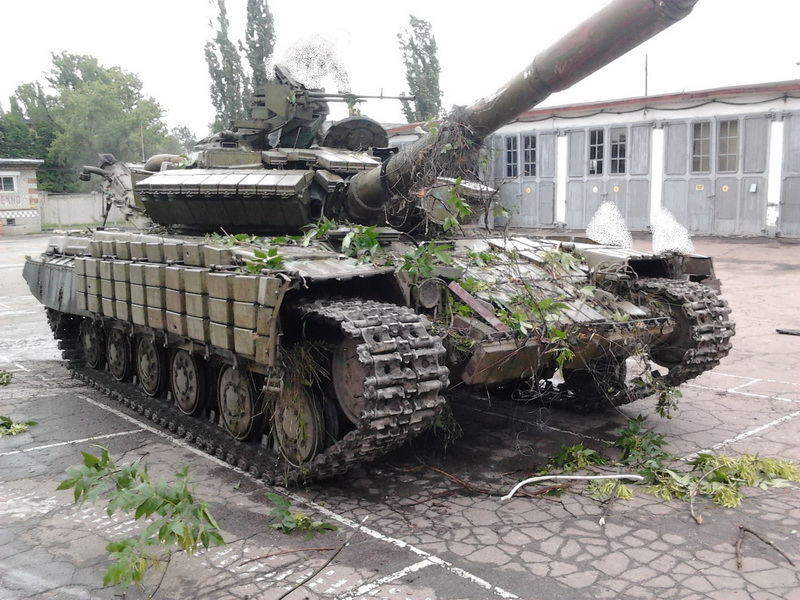
Russian T-64BV No. 5 was captured by the Ukrainian army after the pro-Russian retreat from Artemivsk. 27 June 2014.

Pro-Russian forces lost a T-64BV tank with the number 5, seized by Ukrainian fighters. An RPO-A Shmel rocket-assisted flamethrower of Russian design with the inscription "From Russia with love" was also captured. According to information from the Ministry of Defense of Ukraine, these weapons were also provided to the DPR army by Russia.

RPO-A trophy flamethrower Shmel

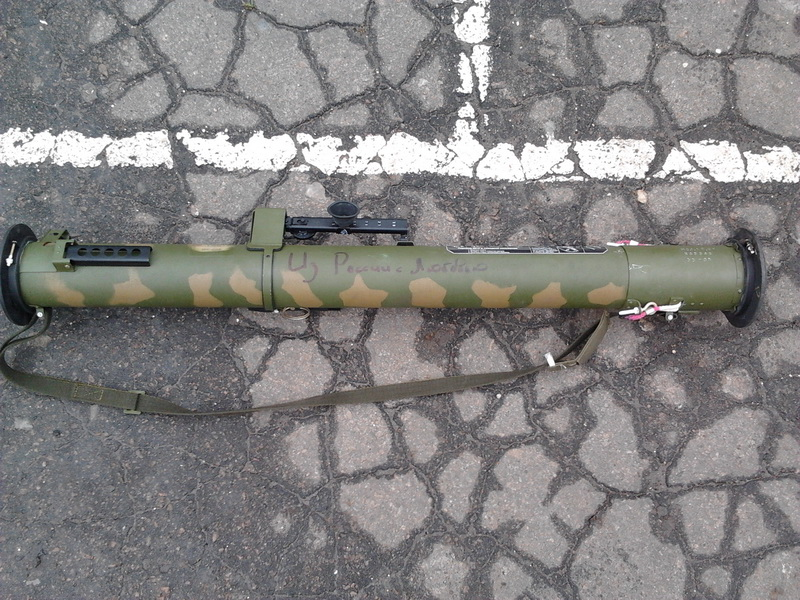
General view, June 2014

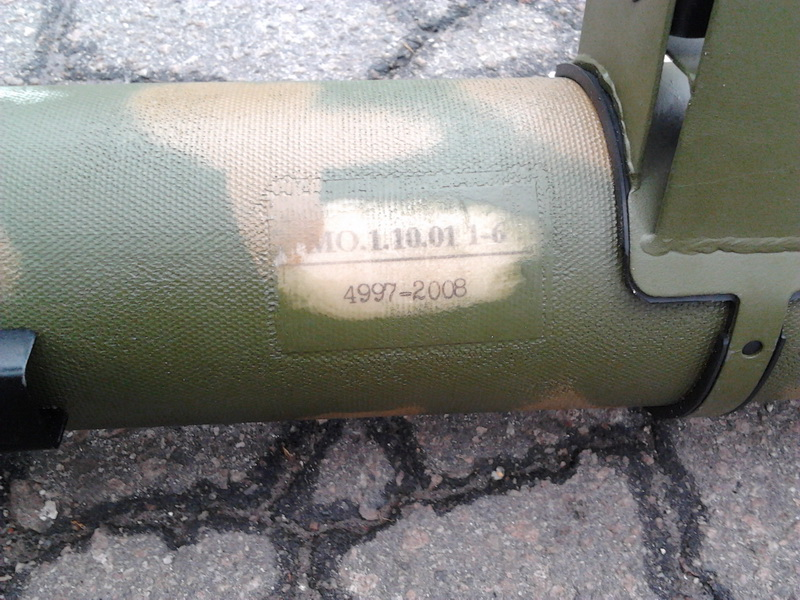
Marking

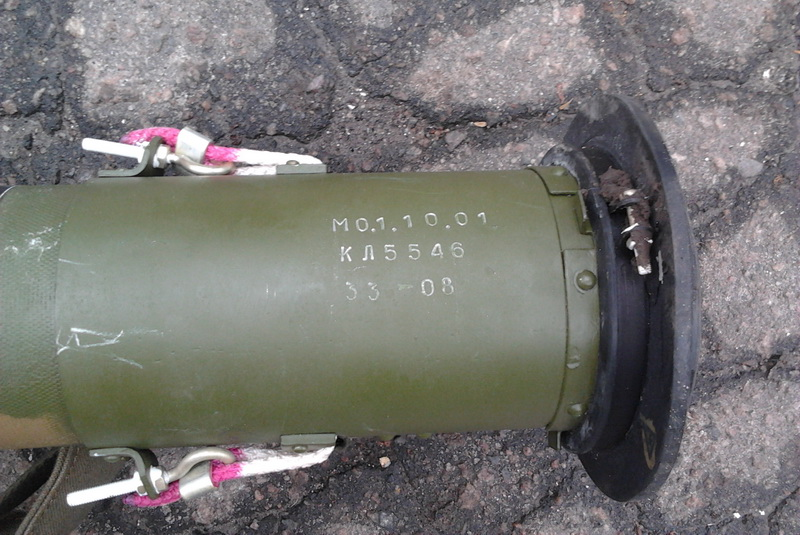
Second marking

== Aftermath ==
Successful repulsion of the attack by special forces fighters and military personnel A2730 and A4176 was important, because huge reserves of weapons and ammunition, which were located in the Center for the provision of armored weapons in Artemivsk and the storage base of small arms in the village of Paraskoviivka, did not fall into the hands of the militants.

For his successful performance of the combat task, Alexander Trepak received the rank of Colonel, Order of Bogdan Khmelnytsky III. The servicemen of parts A2730 and A4176 were not mentioned or presented for awards.

=== Post-2014 control and name change ===
Following the Ukrainian victory in July 2014, Artemivsk remained under government control for the next eight years. On 4 February 2016, as part of Ukraine's decommunization laws, the city was officially renamed back to its historical name, Bakhmut.

=== 2022 Russian invasion and Battle of Bakhmut ===
In 2022, the city became a major flash-point during the Russian invasion of Ukraine. From August 2022 to May 2023, Bakhmut was the site of the Battle of Bakhmut, one of the longest and bloodiest battles of the war. Russian forces, primarily the Wagner Group, eventually captured the city on 20 May 2023.

The successful defense of the weapons depots in 2014 may have contributed to Bakhmut's later strategic importance. The armored weapons center (Unit A2730) and small arms storage base (Unit A4176) that were defended in 2014 remained under Ukrainian control and were likely used to supply Ukrainian forces during the 2022–2023 battle.

As of 2026, Bakhmut remains under Russian occupation, though Ukrainian forces continue to operate in the surrounding area.

== See also ==
- Outline of the Russo-Ukrainian War
- Battle of Bakhmut – Battle in the Russo-Ukrainian war in 2022 and 2023
- Timeline of the war in Donbas (2014)
