= Storm Ossetia =

- Шторм.Осетия (ru); Тымыгъ.Ирыстон (os)
- Active: 2022 – 19 June 2023 ? – Present
- Country: Russia
- Allegiance: Russian Armed Forces
- Branch: 429th Motorized Rifle Regiment, 19th Motor Rifle Division
- Role: Militia
- Size: 300 (peak)
- Engagements: Russian invasion of Ukraine: 2023 Ukrainian counteroffensive

Commanders
- Notable commanders: Ayvengo Tekhov †

Insignia
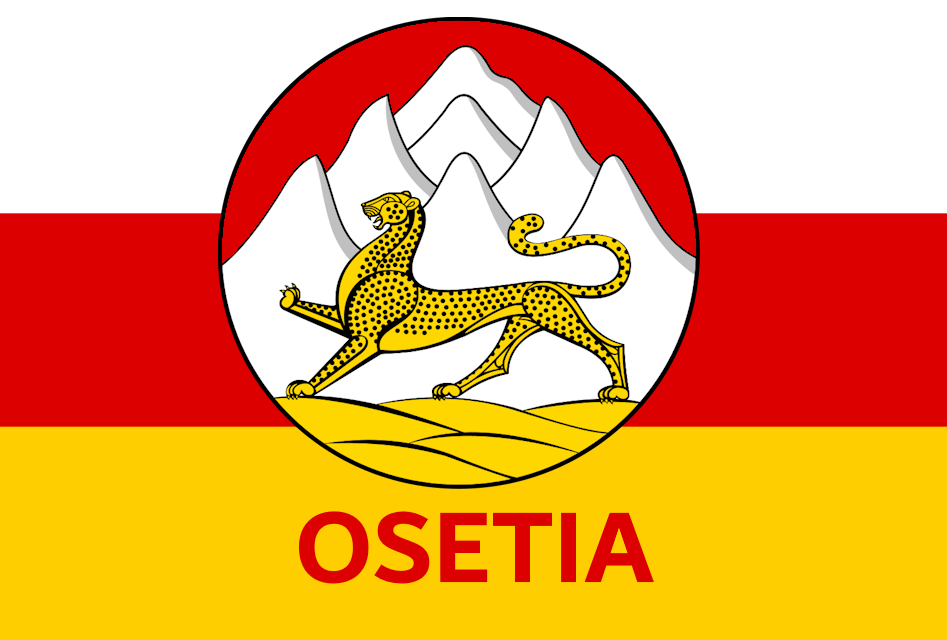
- Flag

Storm Ossetia (Russian: Шторм.Осетия, romanized: Shtorm.Osetiya) (Iron Ossetic: Тымыгъ.Ирыстон, romanized: Tymyh.Iryston) is a North Ossetian militia serving under the Russian Armed Forces raised from volunteers from North Ossetia–Alania during the Russian invasion of Ukraine.

== History ==
On 11 June 2023, it was reported that volunteer units made up a portion of the Russian front line during the 2023 Ukrainian counteroffensive, including Storm Ossetia, as well as another North Ossetian unit "Alania", and two Russian units "Crimea" and "Sarmat." These units were tasked with holding the front-line around the village of Lobkove, but were unable to do so, retreating to pre-prepared positions and leaving the village in Ukrainian hands.

The unit was then tasked to hold the village of Piatykhatky just south of Lobkove. The unit was able to hold onto the village for five days, repelling two attempts by Ukrainian forces to storm their positions. However, their position was deemed untenable and were given orders to retreat again to other pre-prepared positions. During the chaos of the retreat out of Piatykhatky on 19 June, the unit found itself encircled by the advancing Ukrainian forces. The 300-man battalion was reported to have been "liquidated" to the last fighter, including their deputy commander Ayvengo Tekhov.

The unit's Telegram account denied the unit took any casualties, and re-posted old photos of the unit as "proof." However, Russian officials held a memorial for the unit in Vladikavkaz, where they mourned the unit which decided to stand “to the last.”

The battalion's remnants, mostly consisting of their officers, support and media team were absorbed into the "Alania" volunteer battalion, which Storm Ossetia had fought alongside during the counteroffensive.

On January 5 2025, the HUR issued a report claiming that the Ukrainian Kraken Unit killed the chief of staff of the Battalion, Sergei Melnikov, and his driver using drones along the Vasylivka-Tokmak highway in Zaporizhzhia Oblast.

== Commanders ==
- Ayvengo Tekhov (Iron Ossetic: Тъехты Aйвенго, 1991-2023) †.
- Sergei Melnikov (2023-2024) †.
