= Rivnopil, Velyka Novosilka settlement hromada, Volnovakha Raion, Donetsk Oblast =

Village in Donetsk Oblast, Ukraine

Rivnopil Рівнопіль
- Village
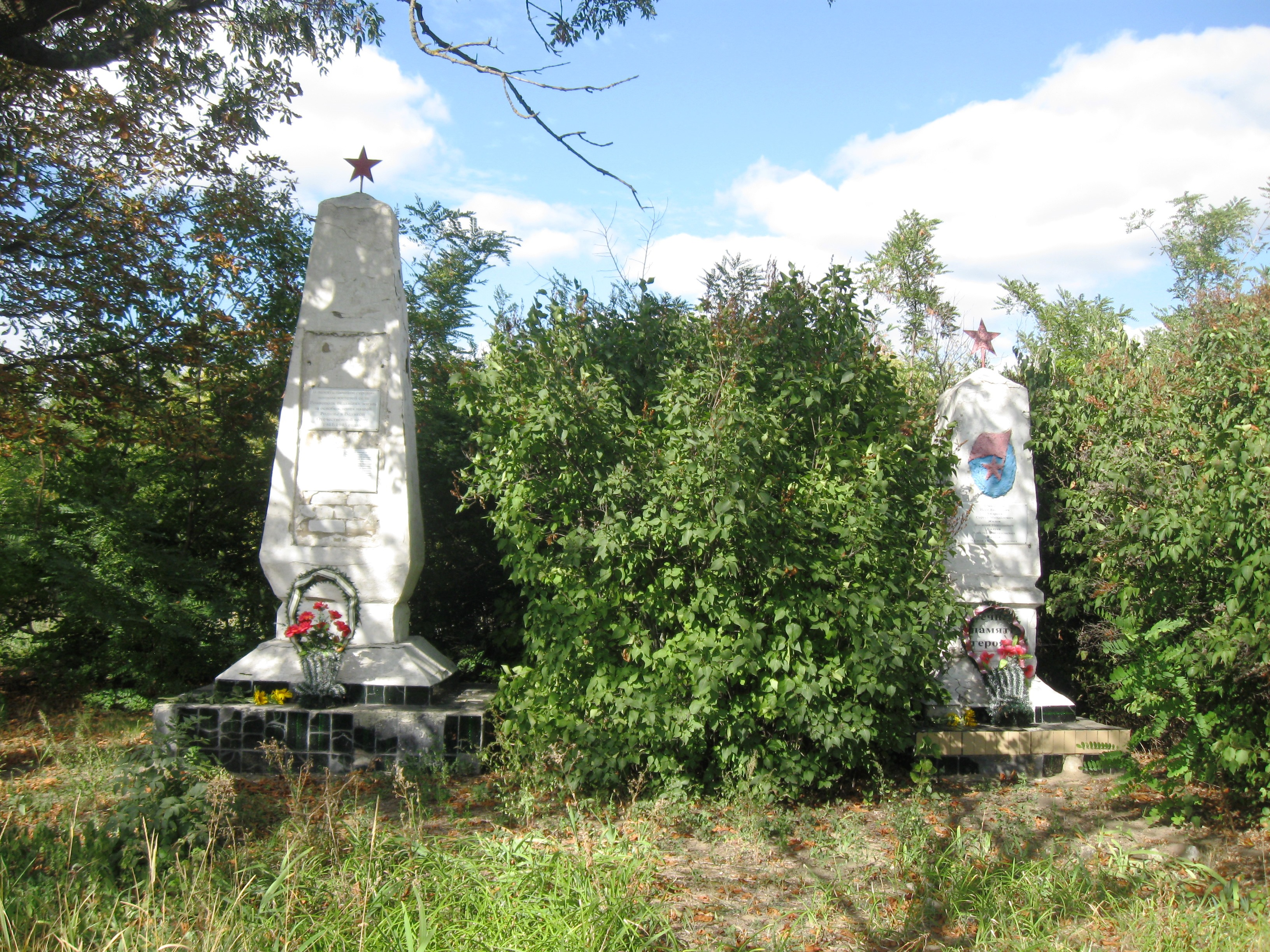
- Mass grave of Soviet soldiers of the Southern Front and a monument to fellow villagers (September 2018)
- Interactive map of Rivnopil
- Location of Rivnopil in Donetsk Oblast Rivnopil (Donetsk Oblast)
- Coordinates: 47.786111°N 36.699167°E
- Country: Ukraine
- Oblast: Donetsk Oblast
- Raion: Volnovakha Raion
- Hromada: Velyka Novosilka settlement hromada

Area
  - Total: 0.702 km^{2} (0.271 sq mi)
- Elevation: 163 m (535 ft)

Population (2001 census)
  - Total: 98
  - Density: 140/km^{2} (360/sq mi)
- Time zone: UTC+2 (EET)
  - Summer (DST): UTC+3 (EEST)
- Postal code: 85760
- Area code: +380 6243

Rivnopil (Ukrainian: Рівнопіль; Russian: Ровнополь) is a village in Volnovakha Raion (district) in Donetsk Oblast of eastern Ukraine, at about 85.99 kilometres (53.43 mi) southwest by west (SWbW) of the centre of Donetsk city. It belongs to Velyka Novosilka settlement hromada. It is situated on the border of the Donetsk Oblast and the Zaporizhzhia Oblast.

== History ==
The village was taken under control by Russian forces in March 2022 and was regained by Ukrainian forces on 25 June 2023. In mid-November 2024, the Russian armed forces regained control over the settlement.

== Demographics ==
As of the 2001 Ukrainian census, the settlement had 98 inhabitants, whose native languages were 43.88% Ukrainian and 56.12% Russian.
