= Novodonetske, Volnovakha Raion, Donetsk Oblast =

Rural settlement in Donetsk Oblast, Ukraine

Novodonetske Новодонецьке
- Rural settlement
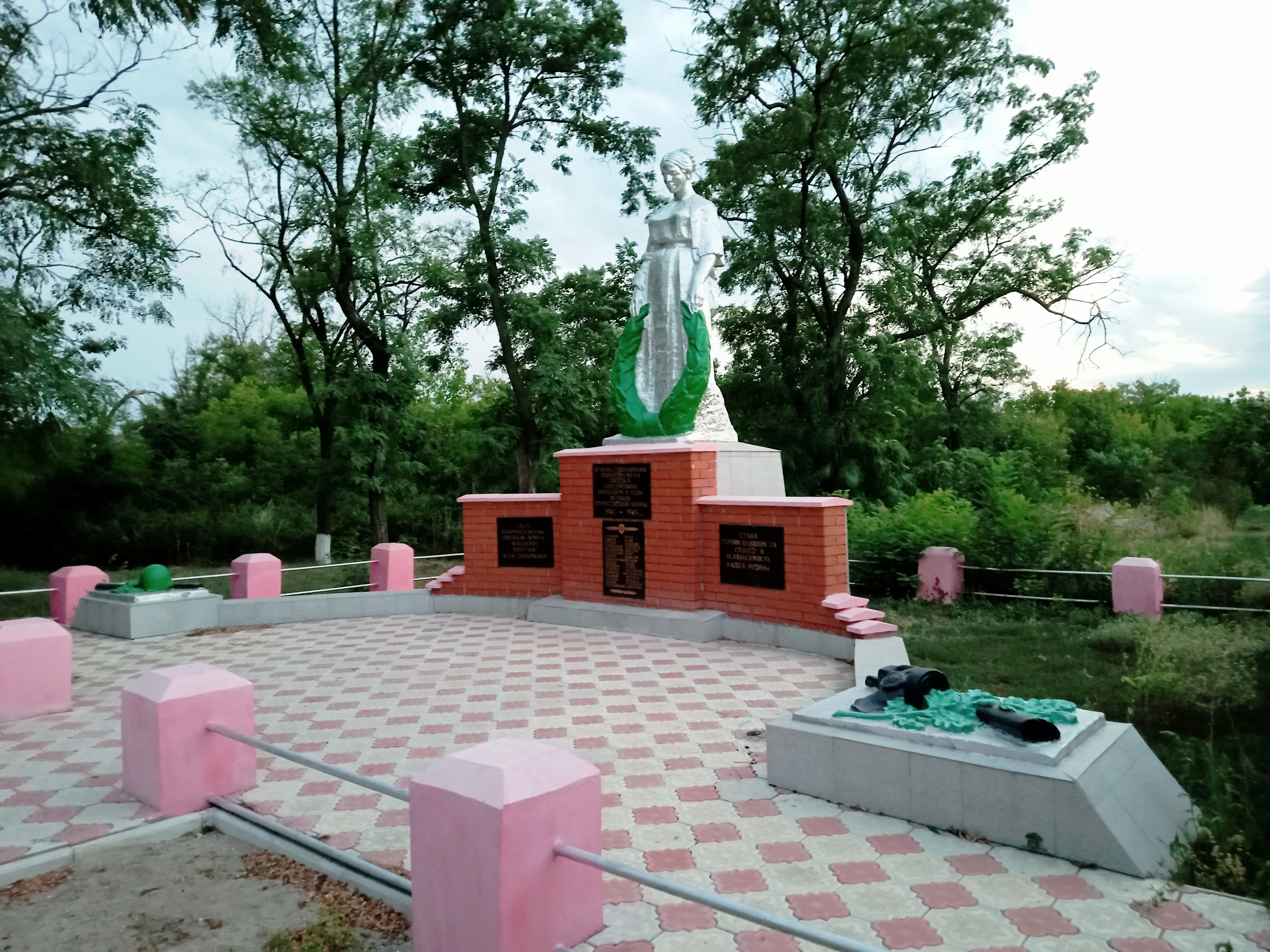
- Interactive map of Novodonetske
- Location of Novodonetske within Donetsk Oblast#Location of Vodianske within Ukraine Novodonetske (Ukraine)
- Coordinates: 47°45′15″N 36°57′40″E
- Country: Ukraine
- Oblast: Donetsk Oblast
- District: Volnovakha Raion
- Hromada: Staromlynivka rural hromada
- Elevation: 138 m (453 ft)

Population (2001).
  - Total: 327
- Time zone: UTC+2 (EET)
  - Summer (DST): UTC+3 (EEST)
- Postal code: 85561
- Area code: +380 6277

Novodonetske (Ukrainian: Новодонецьке; Russian: Новодонецкое, romanized: Novodonetskoye) is a rural settlement in the Volnovakha Raion, Donetsk Oblast (province) of eastern Ukraine.

== History ==
The village was occupied by Russian forces during the Russian invasion of Ukraine in 2022. On 5 September 2023, during the 2023 Ukrainian counteroffensive, after several days of artillery preparations the Ukrainian Armed Forces made an attempt to break through Russian defense lines north of the village, using a large number of armored vehicles. The 37th Separate Marine Brigade made an amphibious landing across the Shaitanka river, and struck directly at the Russian fortifications.

== Demographics ==
In the 2001 Ukrainian census, the village was reported to have a population of 327 people, of whom 80.12% spoke Ukrainian and 19.88% spoke Russian.
