= Maiak, Chornomorske Raion =

Village in Crimea

Maiak Маяк
- Village
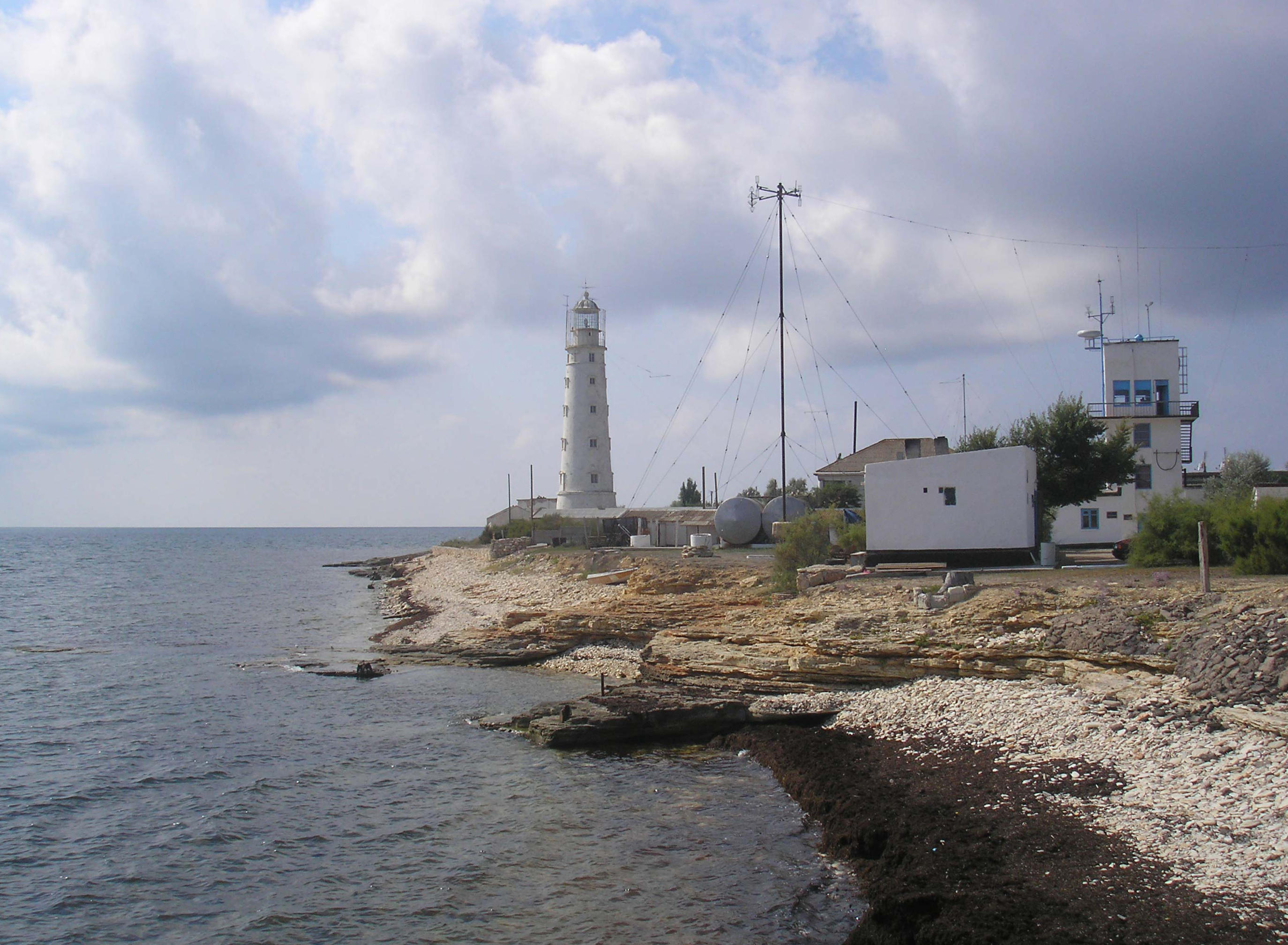
- The lighthouse at Cape Tarkhankut
- Interactive map of Maiak
- Location of Mayak in Crimea Maiak (Crimea)
- Coordinates: 45.347778°N 32.496111°E
- Country (de jure)^{1}: Ukraine
- Region: Autonomous Republic of Crimea
- Raion: Chornomorske Raion

Population (2001 census)
  - Total: 49
- Time zone: UTC+2 (EET)
  - Summer (DST): UTC+3 (EEST)
- Postal code: 96440
- Area code: +380 6558

Maiak (Ukrainian: Маяк; Russian: Маяк) is a village in Chornomorske Raion (district) in the Autonomous Republic of Crimea, on the Tarkhankut Peninsula, on the western coast of Crimea.
