= Andriivka, Horlivka Raion, Donetsk Oblast =

Urban locality in Donetsk Oblast, Ukraine

Andriivka Андріївка
- Rural settlement
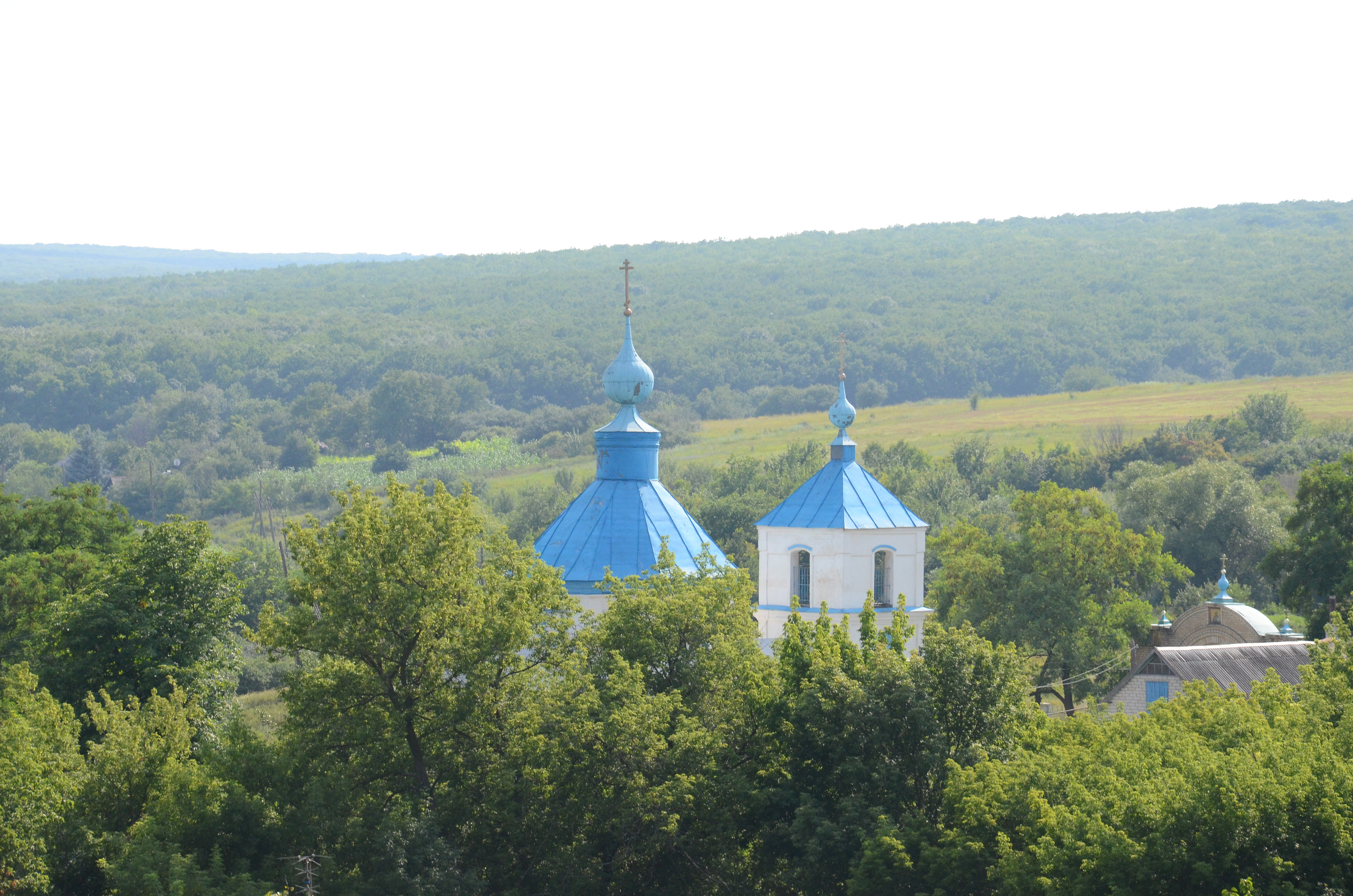
- The Church of the Intercession of the Holy Theotokos in Andriivka

- Location of Andriivka in Donetsk Oblast Andriivka (Donetsk Oblast)
- Coordinates: 48°07′13″N 38°41′51″E
- Country: Ukraine
- Oblast: Donetsk Oblast
- Raion (de jure): Horlivka Raion
- Municipality (de facto): Snizhne Municipality
- Elevation: 159 m (522 ft)

Population (2022)
  - Total: 2,124
- Time zone: UTC+2
  - Summer (DST): UTC+3
- Postal code: 86580-86582
- Area code: +380 6256

Andriivka (Ukrainian: Андріївка) is a rural settlement in Horlivka Raion, Donetsk Oblast, eastern Ukraine. Since 2014, it has been under the control of the self-declared Donetsk People's Republic. Population: 2,124 (2022 estimate).

== History ==
Andriivka was founded in 1789, and in 1918 the Bolsheviks took over the village and it became part of the Soviet Union. A branch of the Komsomol organization was founded a few years later in 1926. During World War II, 99 residents of the village fought in the war, of which 47 died.

The village hosts a branch of the Chystiakove vegetable and dairy farm, for which several residents received order and medals from the USSR in labour achievements.

== Demographics ==
Native language as of the Ukrainian Census of 2001:

- Ukrainian 73.87%
- Russian 25.83%
- Belarusian 0.04%

== Monuments ==
There is a monument to the soldiers who died retaking the village from the Nazis during World War II, and another monuments to all local residents who fought in the war.
