= Paraskoviivka, Bakhmut Raion, Donetsk Oblast =

Settlement in Donetsk Oblast, Ukraine

Paraskoviivka Парасковіївка Парасковиевка
- Village
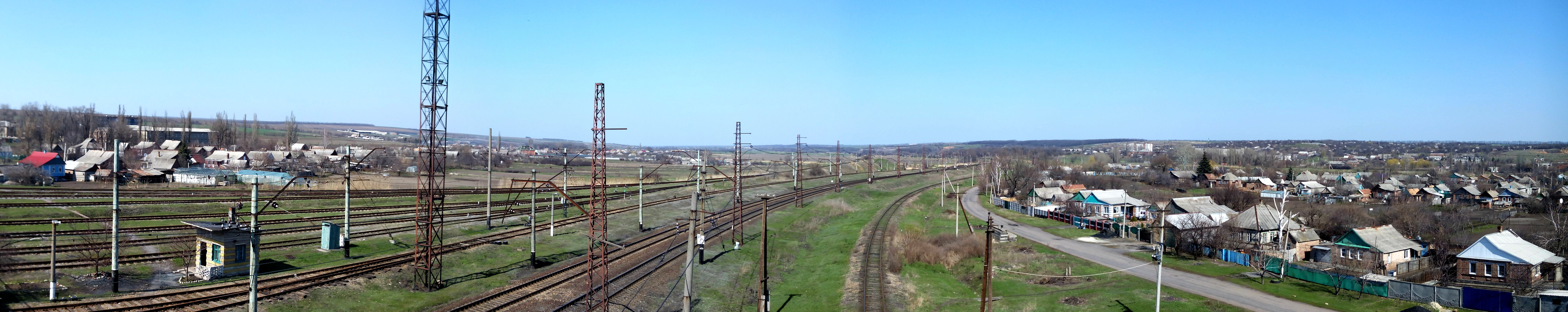
- Panoramio in 2023, Railway station Stantsiia Shevchenko in 2015 and Monument

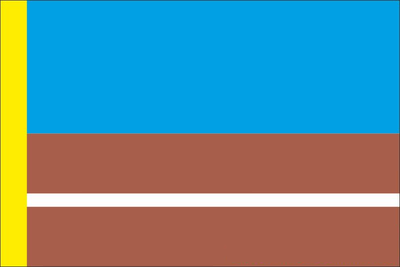
- Flag
- Interactive map of Paraskoviivka
- Location of Paraskoviivka within Donetsk Oblast Paraskoviivka (Ukraine)
- Coordinates: 48°39′42″N 38°0′8″E
- Country: Ukraine
- Oblast: Donetsk Oblast
- Raion: Bakhmut Raion
- Hromada: Soledar urban hromada

Population (2022)
  - Total: 2,810
- Time zone: UTC+2 (EET)
  - Summer (DST): UTC+3 (EEST)
- Postal code: 84536
- Area code: +380 6274

Paraskoviivka (Ukrainian: Парасковіївка; Russian: Парасковиевка, romanized: Paraskoviyevka) is a selo (village) in Bakhmut Raion, Donetsk Oblast, eastern Ukraine. The settlement is north of the city of Bakhmut, south-west of Soledar, west of Krasna Hora, and east of Kramatorsk. It had a population of at least 2,810 people in January 2022.

Beginning on 15 January 2023, the city suffered a number of attacks and offensives around it, with attacks increasing in January 2023. After attacks in the northern towns of the settlement increased and rising captures inside of Bakhmut, caused a two-week long battle in Paraskoviivka in late February 2023. The settlement was highly affected with several civilian casualties reported. On 18 February 2023 the Russian forces and PMC Wagner captured Paraskoviivka.

== Geography ==
Paraskoviivka is located in Bakhmut Raion, Donetsk Oblast, Eastern Ukraine. Paraskoviivka is served by the Donets Railway, with a railway station called "Stantsiia Shevchenko" (Ukrainian: Станція Шевченко; Russian: Станция Шевченко) in the central part of the settlement, which connects with the settlement of Sil and Krasna Hora, and then to Bakhmut. Following that there are monuments also within the city.

== History ==
=== Ukrainian SSR ===
50 residents of the settlement died during the Holodomor, resulting in an overall decrease in the population even after the collapse of the Soviet Union.

=== Russo-Ukrainian War ===
==== War in Donbas (2014–2017) ====
In 2014, during the early outbreaks of violence in the Donbas, Paraskoviivka was used by Ukrainian forces to store supplies, while separatist and Ukrainian forces struggled for control of nearby Artemivsk. Russian and DPR forces ultimately withdrew from the area after the Siege of Sloviansk. Fighting continued in the area until 2017.

==== Russian invasion of Ukraine ====
Fighting at Paraskoviivka took place from 15 January 2023 to 17 February 2023 as part of the 2022 Russian invasion of Ukraine. The siege and the battle as a whole saw heavy fighting from the Russian Armed Forces (alongside the Wagner Group) and the Ukrainian Armed Forces for control of, Paraskoviivka. A large settlement located north of the strategic city of Bakhmut. The battle as a whole lasted for over a month, starting after the battle of Soledar and ending with the Russian offensive towards Northern Bakhmut and the rest of the Paraskoviivka region.

The siege, which had started right after the battle for the city was reported to have started fully somewhere between 10 and 12 February 2023 when Krasna Hora, a town adjacent to Paraskoviivka was reportedly captured. Russia reportedly attacked one of the settlement's main roads which connected it to Berkhivka, another town adjacent to it. Over 1,500 Ukrainian soldiers were reported to have been stuck inside the city at the time of the road's capture making the situation in the city dire for Ukraine. Small counterattacks were reported to have been happening between both armies making the battle way deadlier.
