= Berkhivka =

Berkhivka Берхівка Berkhovka
- Village
- Interactive map of Berkhivka
- Location of Berkhivka within Ukraine Berkhivka (Ukraine)
- Coordinates: 48.645278°N 37.967222°E
- Country: Ukraine
- Oblast: Donetsk Oblast
- Raion: Bakhmut Raion
- Hromada: Bakhmut urban hromada

Population (2022)
  - Total: 43
- Time zone: UTC+2 (EET)
  - Summer (DST): UTC+3 (EEST)
- Postal code: 84557

Berkhivka (Ukrainian: Берхівка) is a village in Bakhmut Raion, Donetsk Oblast, Ukraine. It is located about 58 metres (190 ft) southwest of Paraskoviivka, and 3 kilometres (1.9 miles) northwest of Bakhmut. The settlement's population has fallen from 118 registered in the 2001 census, to 43 in 2022. It has been an important frontline village during the Russian invasion of Ukraine.

The Berkhivka Reservoir is located close to the village.

== History ==
Russian forces were reported to have shelled Berkhivka on 17 February 2023, with an airstrike also reported near the village.

On 24 February 2023, PMC Wagner claimed that they had taken the village after a few days of fighting. On June 5, Yevgeny Prigozhin, the head of the Wagner Group, claimed that Ukrainian forces re-entered the settlement, with heavy fighting starting soon after.

Historical population
Year	Pop.	±% p.a.
2001	118	—
2014	95	—
2022	43	—
