= Markus Reisner =

Austrian military historian and officer

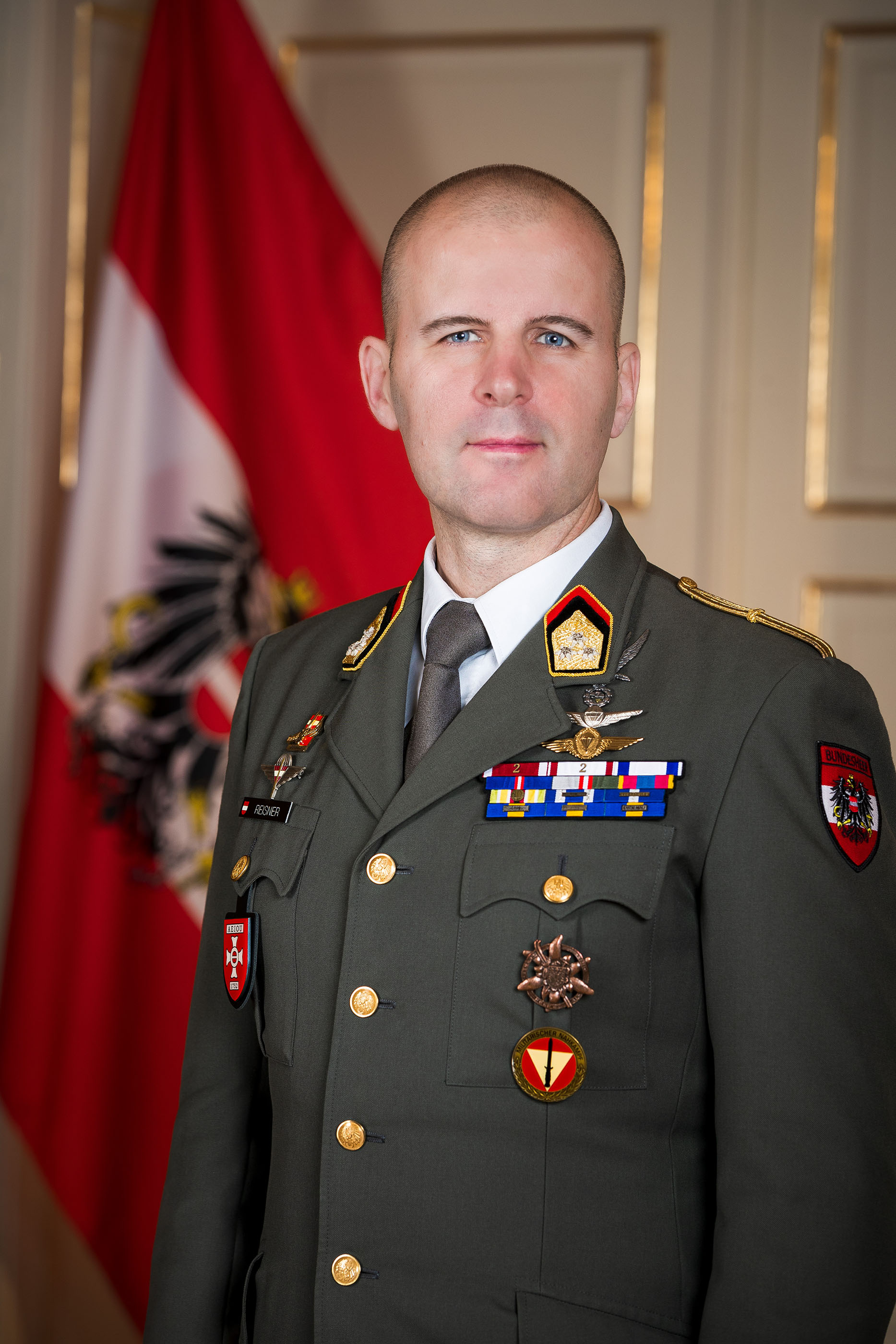
Reisner in 2024

Markus Reisner (born March 10, 1978, in Bucklige Welt, Lower Austria) is an Austrian historian, military expert, and officer of the Austrian Armed Forces serving as superintendent of the institute for officer training at Theresian Military Academy. He became known to a wider international audience through his analyses on YouTube and elsewhere of the military developments during the Russian invasion of Ukraine from February 2022.

== Professional life ==
=== Training and first assignments ===
Markus Reisner joined the Austrian Armed Forces in 1997 as a one-year volunteer and subsequently completed a preparatory semester for the Military Academy in Allentsteig.

From 1998 to 2002, he attended the Theresian Military Academy in Wiener Neustadt where he trained as an officer. He then served in the Reconnaissance Battalion 2 in Salzburg until 2004, where he was assigned as a platoon commander, deputy company commander, and training officer of an armored reconnaissance company. After that, he served with the Jagdkommando in Wiener Neustadt until 2013.

=== Studies and doctorate ===
Reisner studied law and history at the University of Vienna. From 2010 to 2013, he completed doctoral studies in history at the University of Vienna (dissertation on the aerial warfare over Austria from 1943 to 1945, supervisor Lothar Höbelt). In 2017, he completed his Ph.D. studies at the Faculty of Law at the University of Vienna.

=== Service as a staff officer ===
From 2014 to 2016, he completed the 20th General Staff Course at the National Defense Academy in Vienna. In June 2020, he was appointed head of the Development Department of the Theresian Military Academy, and led it with the rank of Colonel of the General Staff. From September 1, 2022, to February 29, 2024, Reisner was commander of the Gardebataillon, one of the most elite and traditional units of the Austrian Armed Forces, in Vienna. Since March 2024, he is serving as superintendent of the institute for officer's training at Theresian Military Academy.

=== Academic career ===
Markus Reisner currently is a member of the Military History Advisory Board of the Scientific Commission at the Austrian Federal Ministry of Defense (since 2017), and holds a position as lecturer at the University of Applied Sciences Wiener Neustadt (since 2011). Before, he advised the Austrian Ministry of Foreign Affairs (2017–2018), as well as the Austrian ministry of defense (2018).

He has gained public recognition as head of the Development Department of the Theresian Military Academy, where he delivered battlefield analyses in the form of YouTube videos on the 2022 Russian invasion of Ukraine. These videos had mainly been watched in the German sprachraum at first, but started to gather an international audience since being made available in English. Reisner is a speaker at the Candid Foundation, the University of Leeds, and the Austrian Institute for European and Security Policy.

Since 2000, Reisner has regularly published books and articles for German and English journals.

In 2023, he was appointed to the board of the Clausewitz Network for Strategic Studies.

==== Stands ====
Reisner's analyses on YouTube and elsewhere of the Russian invasion of Ukraine from February 2022 drew international attention of a wider public. He warned early on against underestimating the Russian armed forces, as it emerged that they were recovering from their initial setbacks. In December 2023 he stated: "From a neutral perspective, the situation is serious. The West has to understand that. Is it ready to support Ukraine? Then it has to do more. If it is not ready to do that, then it has to communicate that. This miserable purgatory that is currently taking place only brings more deaths, but no result."

=== Foreign deployments ===
- 2004–2013 in Bosnia and Herzegovina, Kosovo, Afghanistan, Chad, and the Central African Republic
- 2019 as Austrian contingent commander in Mali
- 2021 as Austrian contingent commander in Kosovo

== Works ==
=== Monographs ===
- Reisner, Markus (2014). Bomben auf Wiener Neustadt (in German) (3rd ed.). Berndorf: Kral. ISBN 978-3990242377.
- Reisner, Markus; Höller, Hans (2017). Unter Rommels Kommando (in German). With contributions by Andreas Hartinger. Berndorf: Kral. ISBN 978-3990247129.
- Reisner, Markus (2018). Robotic Wars (in German). Berlin: Miles. ISBN 978-3-945861-78-3.
- Reisner, Markus (2020). Die Schlacht um Wien 1945 (in German). Berndorf: Kral. ISBN 978-3990248980.
- Väth, Christian; Reisner, Markus (2022). Die taktische Drohne (in German). Klagenfurt: Spartanat. ISBN 978-3-9505324-0-1.
- Nagy, Kristóf; Reisner, Markus; Väth, Christian (2024). Defense against Drones. Translated by Holsworth, Lawrence. Klagenfurt: Spartanat. ISBN 978-3903526174.

=== Editorship ===
- Hans Hoeller – D-Day Tank Hunter. The World War II Memoirs of a Frontline Officer from North Africa to the bloody Soil of Normandy. s.l. 2022, ISBN 979-8428334104.

=== Articles ===
- Multinational Robotic Wars. The increasing Use of Unmanned Systems by State and Non-State-Actors in current and future Conflict Zones. Institut für Friedenssicherung und Konfliktmanagement (IFK), contribution to 2018 IFK anthology, Wien 2018.
- Current drone warfare in the light of the prohibition of interventions. University of Vienna Law Review. 2 (1): 69–94, Wien 2018.
- Drones … the poor man's Airforce. Truppendienst. 4/2019: 310–317.

=== Videos ===
- Heavy Weapons to Ukraine: Heavy Metal & Rock 'n' Roll. YouTube – Österreichs Bundesheer.
- Cognitive Warfare – The Fight for your Heart and Mind. YouTube – Österreichs Bundesheer.
- War for Ukraine – First Conclusions from 2022 and New Challenges 2023. YouTube – Österreichs Bundesheer.
