= Zybyne =

Zybyne Зибине
- Village
- Interactive map of Zybyne
- Location of Zybyne within Ukraine Zybyne (Ukraine)
- Country: Ukraine
- Oblast: Kharkiv Oblast
- Raion: Chuhuiv Raion
- Hromada: Vovchansk urban hromada
- Founded: 1600

Area
  - Total: 0.71 km^{2} (0.27 sq mi)
- Elevation: 109 m (358 ft)

Population (2001 census)
  - Total: 115
  - Density: 160/km^{2} (420/sq mi)
- Time zone: UTC+2 (EET)
  - Summer (DST): UTC+3 (EEST)
- Postal code: 62508
- Area code: +380 5741

Zybyne (Ukrainian: Зибине; Russian: Зыбино) is a village in the Chuhuiv Raion of Kharkiv Oblast in eastern Ukraine, at about 70.40 kilometres (43.74 mi) from the centre of Kharkiv, and at about 3 kilometres (1.9 mi) south of the Russia–Ukraine border. It belongs to Vovchansk urban hromada, one of the hromadas of Ukraine.

== History ==
The village was founded in 1600.

=== Russian invasion of 2022 ===
During the initial eastern campaign of the 2022 Russian invasion of Ukraine, the village was occupied by Russia on 24 February 2022, the first day of the conflict. It was retaken by Ukrainian forces later that year during the 2022 Kharkiv counteroffensive.

Russian forces began combat operations in the area of Zybyne once again on 10 May 2024 during the 2024 Kharkiv offensive, with no particular success by the second half of May. By 17 April 2026, Russian forces took control of the village.

== Demographics ==
In 2001 the settlement had 115 inhabitants, whose native languages as of the 2001 Ukrainian census:

- Ukrainian – 92.17%
- Russian – 6.96%
- Armenian – 0.87%
