= Nesterianka =

Village in Zaporizhzhia Oblast, Ukraine

Nesterianka Нестерянка
- Village
- Interactive map of Nesterianka
- Location of Nesterianka in Zaporizhzhia Oblast Nesterianka (Ukraine)
- Coordinates: 47.496574°N 35.6869°E
- Country: Ukraine
- Oblast: Zaporizhzhia Oblast
- Raion: Polohy Raion
- Founded: 1917

Area
  - Total: 0.81 km^{2} (0.31 sq mi)
- Elevation: 128 m (420 ft)

Population (2001 census)
  - Total: 1,566
  - Density: 1,900/km^{2} (5,000/sq mi)
- Time zone: UTC+2 (EET)
  - Summer (DST): UTC+3 (EEST)
- Postal code: 70561
- Area code: +380 6141

Nesterianka (Ukrainian: Нестерянка; Russian: Нестерянка) is a village in Polohy Raion (district) in Zaporizhzhia Oblast of southern Ukraine, at about 56.11 kilometres (34.87 mi) southeast (SE) from the centre of Zaporizhzhia city.

The village was attacked and captured by Russian forces in September 2022, during the Russian invasion of Ukraine.
