= Shelling of Huliaipole =

Ongoing battle of the Russo-Ukrainian War

Coordinates: 47°39′51.9708″N 36°15′47.4178″E

In the first weeks of the Russian invasion of Ukraine, the Russian forces captured and occupied the southern part of Zaporizhzhia Oblast. They pushed as far as the Ukrainian cities of Orikhiv and Huliaipole, before the offensive stalled and the front line stabilised just south of Huliaipole. Russian efforts to capture the city were frustrated by the Ukrainian forces.

In May 2022, the Russian forces began an intensive shelling of Huliaipole, which has been carried out on a daily basis in the months since. Civilian infrastructure, including residential buildings, cultural centres and agricultural facilities, were damaged and destroyed during the bombardment. In response to the sustained bombardment of Huliaipole, the Security Service of Ukraine has accused the Russian armed forces of committing war crimes.

== Initial offensive ==
On 5 March, Russian forces briefly entered Huliaipole.

On 26 March, the Zaporizhzhia regional military administration claimed Ukrainian forces had recaptured the villages of Poltavka and Malynivka east of Huliaipole after heavy fighting.

By 30 March, Huliaipole had experienced almost a month of nightly shelling, while its population had decreased to around 2,000, with around a dozen civilian deaths.

== Shelling ==
=== May 2022 ===
In response to Russian shelling, Serhiy Yarmak ordered an evacuation of the town's residents on 11 May. Russian forces destroyed the road between the Ukrainian-held Huliaipole and the Russian-held city of Polohy, using land mines.

=== June 2022 ===
In June, Oleksandr Starukh, the governor of Zaporizhzhia Oblast, reported that the Ukrainian defensive line was being reinforced at Huliaipole, where clashes were still ongoing.

On 9 June, the Chief Intelligence Directorate of the Ukrainian Ministry of Defence reported that the bodies of Russian soldiers who died fighting in Huliaipole had been taken to a meat packing plant in Russian-occupied Melitopol, and accused the Russian government of downplaying the number of casualties. The Chief Intelligence Directorate also revealed that they had attempted to break the siege of Mariupol in early April, but the detachment sent from Huliaipole to break into the city was repelled by the Russian defensive line.

On 13 June, the Russian Air Force launched a series of airstrikes against Ukrainian positions at Huliaipole. The Russian armed forces reportedly continued to target civilian infrastructure, rather than directly engaging Ukrainian forces. According to the General Staff of the Ukrainian Armed Forces, this continued bombardment was being carried out in order to pin down the Ukrainian forces in Huliaipole, as part of an attempt by Russian forces to capture the city of Sievierodonetsk. Mortars, artillery and multiple rocket launchers were fired against Ukrainian positions in Huliaipole by Russian forces, but the Ukrainians were able to repel the Russian offensive. Small gains were made by the Ukrainian forces in the area around Huliaipole, although this came at a high personnel cost, with many Ukrainians being injured in the artillery fire.

=== November 2022 ===
On 12 November, Ivan Fedorov reported that the 115th Separate Melitopol Battalion of the Territorial Defense Forces had destroyed 4 Russian armored personnel carriers near Huliaipole.

On 21 November, Petro Andriushchenko reported that the movement of Russian military equipment and manpower from Mariupol had changed direction towards Huliaipole, confirming that two large military convoys had moved towards the city through Nikolske.

=== December 2022 ===
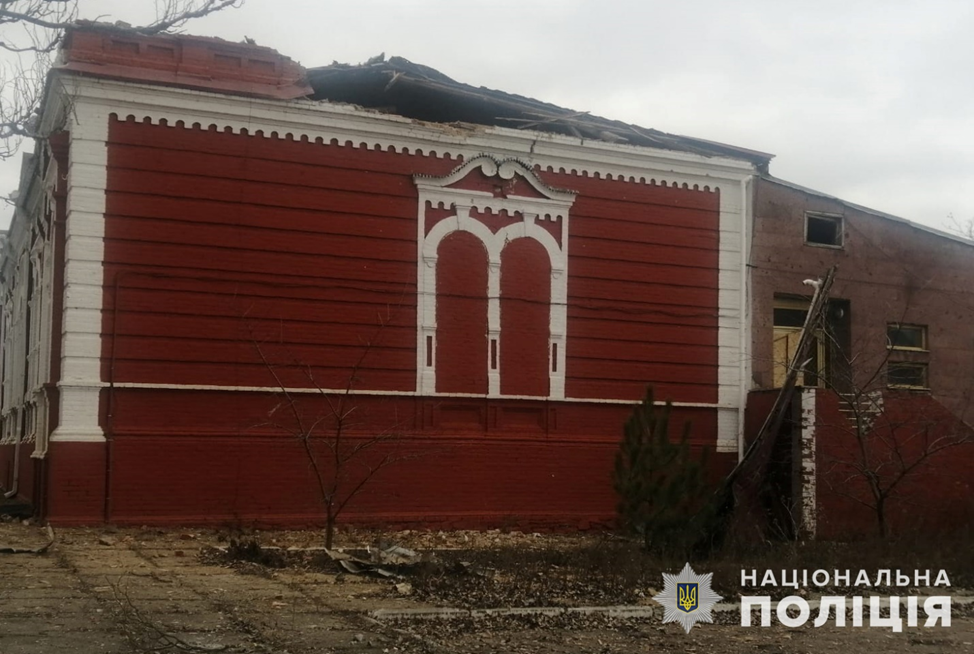
Huliaipole Local Museum after Russian shelling in December 2022

Following a successful counteroffensive that had resulted in the capture of Kherson by Ukrainian forces, attentions began to shift towards a possible offensive in Zaporizhzhia. Since the capture of Kherson, Russian helicopter activity around Huliaipole became more frequent and artillery shelling of Ukrainian positions at Huliaipole intensified, as Russian military equipment was moved towards the city.

On 9 December, Russian and Ukrainian forces at Huliaipole exchanged artillery fire, in response to what Russian intelligence reported to be a massing of Ukrainian mechanized infantry around the city, prompting further speculation of a Ukrainian offensive in the region. On 12 December, UNESCO reported that a cultural center and a Kingdom Hall were among the cultural sites in Huliaipole that were damaged by the Russian strikes. Russian forces also began massing troops around Melitopol, in response to the increasing Ukrainian numbers around Huliaipole.

=== January–February 2023 ===
Huliaipole after long-term Russian shelling (January 2023).

On 7 January, during the Russian-proposed "Christmas truce", approximately 230 shells hit the city.

Having remained largely on the defensive for the first weeks of 2023, on 18 January, the Russian forces attempted an offensive against Orikhiv and Huliaipole, but were unsuccessful. On 22 January, Vladimir Rogov announced that Russian troops were moving towards Orikhiv and Huliaipole as part of a general offensive in Zaporizhzhia Oblast. Ukrainian armed forces repelled the offensive, with Russian officials claiming that their advance had stalled. Reports indicated that Russian forces managed to seize a previously-occupied strip of "no-man's land" closer to the cities, although Ukrainian forces reported no large-scale assault in the area. Russian forces in the area were reportedly held back at the town of Charivne, preventing them from moving up the road towards Orikhiv and Huliaipole.

=== March–May 2023 ===
On 14 March 2023, Huliaipole's mayor Serhiy Yarmak reported that shelling had decreased over the preceding month and that there were still 3,000 residents remaining in the city, including 93 children. According to Yarmak, the hospital continued to treat patients in its basement, local police patrolled the streets to prevent Ukrainian troops from buying alcohol and garbage collectors did their usual routes now in body armour and helmets. Yarmak himself also wears fatigues and armour, sporting a patch that read "Be afraid of hell and the guy from Makhno-city."

On 24 April, Vladimir Rogov, leader of the We Are Together with Russia organisation, claimed that 12,000 Ukrainian troops had massed near Huliaipole.

On 19 May, Yuriy Malashko reported that Russian forces had begun flooding fields and mining dams in Zaporizhzhia Oblast, in anticipation of a Ukrainian counteroffensive. Strikes against Huliaipole, Orikhiv and Mala Tokmachka also increased during this time, in what Malashko believed was an attempt by Russian forces to deter such a counteroffensive. He also reported that, over the previous month, Russian troops had looted homes in the occupied parts of the region and removed documents from the Zaporizhzhia Nuclear Power Plant.

== Counteroffensive ==
=== June 2023 ===
On 4 June, the Armed Forces of Ukraine launched a counteroffensive on the southern and eastern fronts, with Ukrainian forces reportedly carrying out limited attacks against Russian positions near Mala Tokmachka and the Russian forces responding with airstrikes against Ukrainian positions at Huliaipole. A pro-Russian official in the occupied Zaporizhzhia Oblast claimed that the Ukrainian forces were attempting to break through Russian lines and push towards the Azov Sea. Upon returning from the Huliaipole front, governor of Zaporizhzhia Yuriy Malashko confirmed Ukrainian intentions to take the Azov coast and cut the Russian land bridge to Crimea, but cautioned that it would be "very difficult because the Russians have been digging defenses for more than a year."

Over the following days, Ukrainian attacks in eastern Zaporizhzhia continued, with Russian forces claiming to have repelled a Ukrainian ground attack near Velyka Novosilka. On 7 June, skirmishes took place in western Zaporizhzhia, as Ukrainian forces attempted to push south from Orikhiv, but were repelled. Russian and Ukrainian sources also reported a series of explosions near Tokmak. On 9 June, combat operations in western and eastern Zaporizhzhia resulted in incremental gains by the Ukrainian forces, at the expense of some western-supplied tanks being destroyed. The same day, the Russian-installed governor of Zaporizhzhia Oblast Yevgeny Balitsky announced the creation of a "people's militia" to police the occupied parts of the region. On 10 June, Ukrainian attacks south from Orikhiv continued, making marginal gains, aided by western equipment. Ukrainian forces also destroyed a number of Russian thermobaric artillery systems in the region, damaging their capacity to repel Ukrainian attacks. Ukrainian forces reportedly advanced 300 to 500 metres south during their counterattacks in Zaporizhzhia.

=== July 2023 ===
Following the first month of the counteroffensive, by the beginning of July 2023, the Ukrainian forces had managed to push back Russian forces slightly from Huliaipole. This resulted in relatively less Russian shelling of the city centre, with the front line now resting at 6 kilometres away from the city. Russian forces in Zaporizhzhia Oblast continued to focus on preventing the Ukrainian advance, conducting sustained artillery bombardment of front line towns.

Shelling of front line towns in Zaporizhzhia, including Orikhiv, Huliaipole and Zaliznychne, continued as Russian forces attempted to prevent further Ukrainian advances. Meanwhile, Ukrainian forces conducted offensive operations in the directions of Melitopol and Berdiansk, consolidating their positions and striking Russian positions. Russian forces subsequently carried out air strikes against Mala Tokmachka and artillery strikes against Huliaipole and Zaliznychne, but the Ukrainian offensive towards Melitopol and Berdiansk continued to take territory and consolidate the Ukrainian position on the front line.

While Ukrainian offensive operations in Zaporizhzhia Oblast stalled, Russian forces conducted a successful offensive operation near the village of Chervone, east of Huliaipole. Meanwhile, the 35th Russian Army carried out offensive operations around Huliaipole, in order to reinforce the road towards Polohy.

As shelling of front line towns continued, Russian forces attempted to retake Pryiutne, but were unsuccessful. Meanwhile, Ukrainian forces continued to advance in the direction towards Berdiansk, but no movement was taken towards Melitopol due to the dense mining along the frontline. In an attempt to prevent the Ukrainian advance on these fronts, Russian attacks against front line towns continued. On 30 July, Ukrainian forces were able to break through Russian defensive lines in Huliaipole district, advancing towards the village of Pryiutne. According to the Institute for the Study of War, the Ukrainian advances in Zaporizhzhia were "tactically significant", as they had forced Russia to divert some of its forces away from other parts of the front line, presenting further opportunities for a Ukrainian breakthrough. Interviews with the 74th Battalion of the 102nd Brigade, stationed at Huliaipole, found them to be relatively optimistic about the progress of the counteroffensive.

== Stalemate ==
=== December 2023 ===
By December 2023, Ukrainian commander-in-chief Valerii Zaluzhnyi had declared the Ukrainian counteroffensive to have resulted in a stalemate, although this was rebuffed by Ukrainian president Zelenskyy. As offensive actions slowed, the Centre for Eastern Studies reported that Huliaipole, along with Orikhiv, Polohy, Tokmak and Vasylivka, had experienced the most environmental degradation on the southern frontline through Zaporizhzhia Oblast.

On 23 December, Russian attempts to push Ukrainian forces out of their positions on the Zaporizhzhia front line were unsuccessful. On 24 December, Ukrainian forces repelled an attack against Huliaipole by Russian forces. Another Russian attack against Huliaipole was repelled on 25 December. Further Russian attacks on the front line were repelled. On 29 December, Russian forces confirmed that they had initiated a counteroffensive in the eastern part of Zaporizhzhia Oblast. Geolocation confirmed the Russian capture of Dorozhnianka, a town immediately south of Huliaipole.

=== 2024 ===
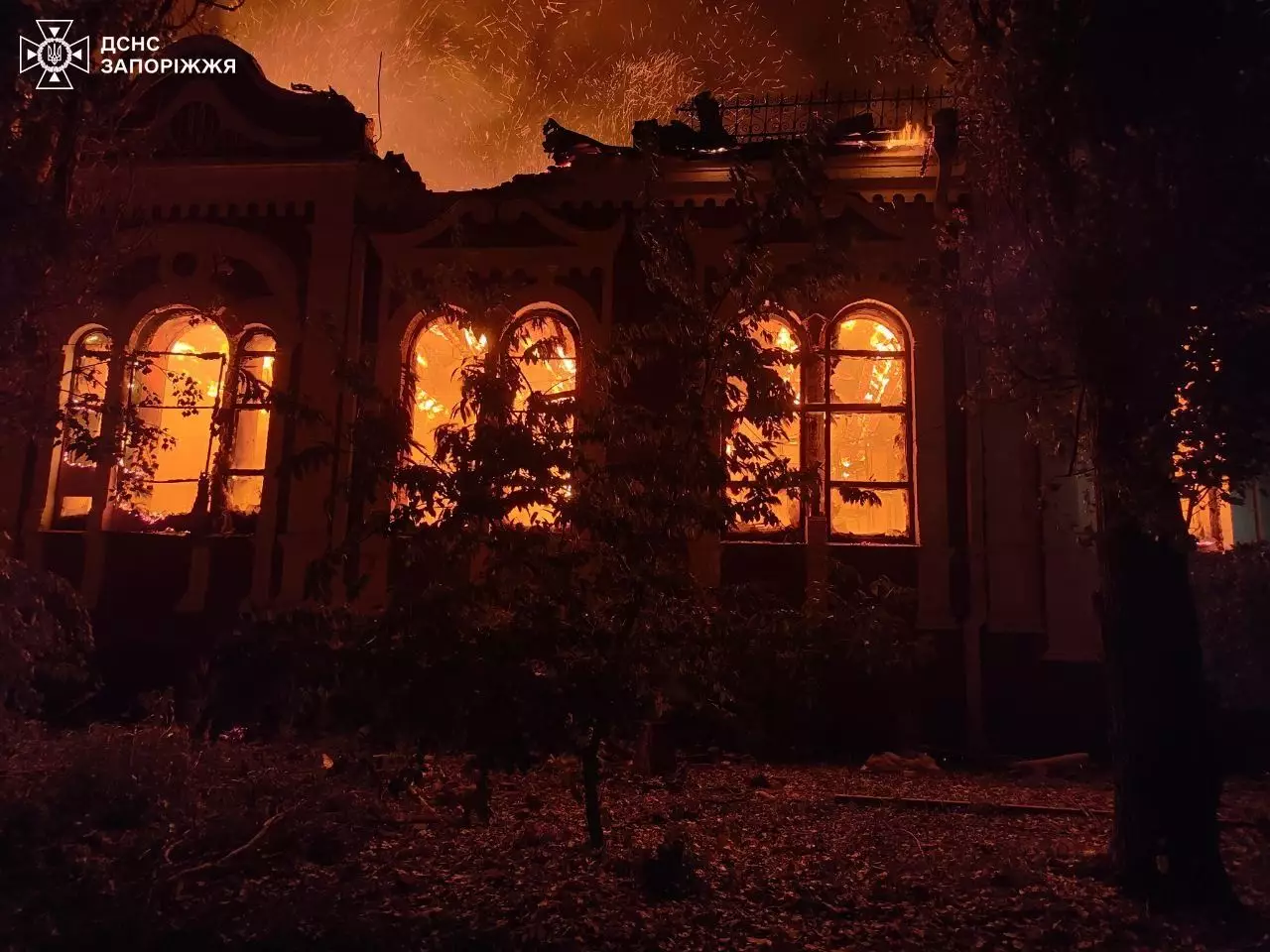
Huliaipole local museum after the strike

In the night on 24 August 2024 the Huliaipole local museum burned down due to a Russian strike. The exposition had already been evacuated to Zaporizhzhia.

== Humanitarian impact and war crimes investigations ==
Huliaipole has endured "months of relentless attacks" during the battle. By November 2022, having faced constant shelling for eight months, the coming winter became a concern for the people of Huliaipole, which was beginning to face negative temperature. As the city no longer had electricity, food was cooked over open fires and water was drawn from wells. Volunteer aid workers distributed warm clothing and food to the locals, who Reuters reported were sheltering from the shelling together in cramped basements. Huliaipole and Orikhiv have both received aid packages from non-governmental organizations such as Slava Ukraini, whose volunteers came under mortar fire during one of their dispatches.

In late January 2023, Huliaipole's historic synagogue was damaged in a Russian missile attack. This prompted condemnation from Israeli politician Ze'ev Elkin, whose family is originally from the city, as well as Ukraine's Chief Rabbi Moshe Reuven Azman.

Throughout the attacks against Huliaipole, aid agencies under the United Nations Office for the Coordination of Humanitarian Affairs (UNOCHR) sent supply convoys to the city on 5 February 2023, bringing relief supplies including water bottles, as the city had been lacking drinking water since the war began. On 8 April 2023, two civilians were injured in Russian airstrikes on Orikhiv and Huliaipole, which also damaged agricultural and residential buildings in the cities. In response, the Security Service of Ukraine initiated a pre-trial investigation into alleged Russian war crimes in Zaporizhzhia Oblast. On 11 April, after a guided missile hit Huliaipole, damaging civilian infrastructure, Zaporizhzhia governor Yuriy Malashko recommended that city's residents limit any visits to cemeteries and announced that restrictions on civilian activity would be introduced during Holy Week. In total, four guarded aerial bombs hit Orikhiv and Huliaipole over the course of that day. Andriy Yermak, the head of the Ukrainian Coordination Headquarters for Humanitarian and Social Affairs, also announced that the damage caused to the cities was being assessed.

On 22 May, Ukrainian volunteers of the Unity of People organization announced that they had set up a shelter which they called an "invincibility point" in Huliaipole, providing food, electricity and hot water for the town's remaining residents. Facing artillery strikes every few hours, Huliaipole's residents have come to avoid the mostly-destroyed city centre, largely keeping to their basement shelters. Viktor Mirzenyi, a resident who fled the city after he was permanently disabled by a mortar strike on his home, says that he and his mother talk often of returning "but there is nothing there, no water, no electricity, nothing left."

By June 2023, electricity, water, and gas services were completely absent. The town has "emptied out", with only approximately 100 mostly elderly residents remaining in the town that had a pre-war population of 12,000. A hospital was also destroyed the same month. According to British journalist Colin Freeman, writing for The Telegraph, "Huliaipole makes a fair claim to be one of the most war-ravaged [towns] in Ukraine". Al Jazeera journalist Alex Gatopoulos reported that the city's residents and its aid infrastructure were largely kept in basements: "life for the people who have remained [in Huliaipole] has moved underground." By February 2024, there were no more buildings left in the city that could provide adequate cover from Russian shelling, with almost all of the city's houses having been damaged or destroyed. The remaining social centre of Huliaipole is a crowded bomb shelter, where electricity is provided by a generator and residents store their basic necessities, known as the "Point of Invincibility".
