= Collaboration with Russia during the Russo-Ukrainian war (2022–present) =

During the Russo-Ukrainian war (2022–present), there have been numerous incidents of Ukrainians collaborating with Russia to undermine Ukraine from within. This phenomenon, which has had a significantly negative impact on the country's aspiration and ability to recover the Russian-occupied territories, has involved both countries' politicians, military officials and soldiers, and ordinary citizens. In response, the Ukrainian government has adopted new legislation that enables the targeting of collaborators by more specifically defining collaborationist acts and by introducing strict punishments for Ukrainians who are found to have colluded with the Russian military campaign in any capacity.

According to the BBC, by August 2024, almost 2,000 Ukrainians had been convicted of collaboration with Russia over the course of the previous two and a half years. Concerns have been raised over the effects of the anti-collaboration legislation on those whose actions do not validly endanger Ukraine's security, such as people who resort to accepting Russia's authority in an attempt to survive and adapt daily aspects of life to the circumstances of long-term (or indefinite) military occupation; Ukraine's methods for prosecuting collaborators have thus been classified by Human Rights Watch and the United Nations OHCHR as standing in violation of international humanitarian law.

As of January 2025, approximately 20% of Ukraine's sovereign territory, containing an estimated 3.5 million Ukrainian citizens, is occupied by Russian troops. Much of this territory—not including parts that were lost in 2014—has not been controlled by Ukraine for well over two years and was annexed by Russia in September 2022.

== Legal regulation ==
After the Russian invasion of Ukraine on 24 February 2022, the Verkhovna Rada adopted two laws on collaborationism, which were later signed by Ukrainian President Volodymyr Zelenskyy:

- Bill No. 5143 introduced an addition to the Criminal Code of Ukraine to Article 111-1 "Treason". According to the amendment, liability was introduced for attempts to organize elections or organize power in the territories occupied by Russia.
- Draft Law No. 5144 provides for amendments to the Criminal and Criminal Procedure Codes of Ukraine. According to the changes, the concept of "collaborationism" is introduced. Punishment is introduced for public denial of Russian armed aggression against Ukraine, support for the actions of Russia, propaganda, and the transfer of material resources.

The law on collaborationism has been discussed since the beginning of the Russian-Ukrainian war in 2014, but the Ukrainian authorities feared that too many residents of the occupied territories could fall under its action. To prosecute collaborators, articles on treason, financing of terrorism, obstruction of the lawful activities of the Armed Forces of Ukraine, etc. were used. The new law made it possible to impose punishment for the very fact of cooperation with the occupiers without the need to prove, for example, damage to the security of the state (as in the case of treason).

1. Public denial of the fact of armed aggression against Ukraine, occupation of its territories, denial of the extension of state sovereignty to the occupied territories.
2. Calls for support of the actions of the aggressor country, support and calls for cooperation with its armed formations or the occupying authorities.
3. Voluntary occupation of positions in the occupation administrations and other illegal authorities, participation in elections or referendums in the occupied territories (up to 10 years in prison)
4. Propaganda in the interests of the aggressor state in educational institutions, promoting the implementation of educational standards of the standards of the aggressor country (up to three years in prison)
5. Transfer of material resources to the Russian military and other economic cooperation (up to five years in prison)
6. Organization and conduct of political events in support of the occupation or participation in them (up to 20 years in prison)
7. Voluntary occupation of positions in law enforcement or judicial bodies formed by the occupation authorities, participation in illegal armed or paramilitary formations or assistance to them in combat operations against Ukraine (up to 15 years in prison)
8. Acts as an official in illegal government bodies that caused death of people or other serious consequences (up to life imprisonment).

Depending on the corpus delicti, Article 111-1 of the Criminal Code provides for penalties of varying severity. The minimum is the deprivation of the right to hold certain positions or engage in certain activities for people holding positions in illegal government bodies that are not related to the adoption of administrative or organizational decisions, as well as for those who spoke out in support of Russia in the media and the Internet. As an additional measure of punishment, confiscation of property may be applied.

The Ukrainian authorities noted that they were not going to persecute people who were forced to work in the occupied territories — public utilities employees, doctors, etc. At the same time, policemen and judges who continued to work after the occupation unequivocally fall under the law.

== Authorities ==
Settlements where the head of the city or village began cooperation with the Russian authorities

Meduza journalists noted that the Russian authorities were probably acting on the basis of the notions of 2014, when the political confrontation in Ukraine allowed them to win over the elites in some regions, members of Viktor Yanukovych 's Party of Regions, and some grassroots movements.

However, after the beginning of the invasion in February 2022, the opposite situation developed: society and political forces consolidated around the sovereignty of Ukraine. In the occupied territories, many politicians who previously spoke from pro-Russian positions refused to cooperate with the Russian military, and the occupation administrations were formed from among insignificant politicians, petty officials and random people.

In February–June 2022, the Chesno movement added 47 collaborating politicians to its list: 12 in the Donetsk region, 10 in Kharkiv region, 9 in Kherson region, 8 in Zaporizhzhia region, 3 each in Luhansk and Sumy regions, 2 in Mykolaiv region. By party affiliation, most of the collaborators were members of the pro-Russian Opposition Platform — For Life (19 out of 34 members of political parties)

Following the invasion, Russia began to organize military-civilian administrations in occupied territories, despite the fact that Russian President Vladimir Putin stated that Russia's plans do not include the occupation of Ukrainian territories.

=== Kherson ===
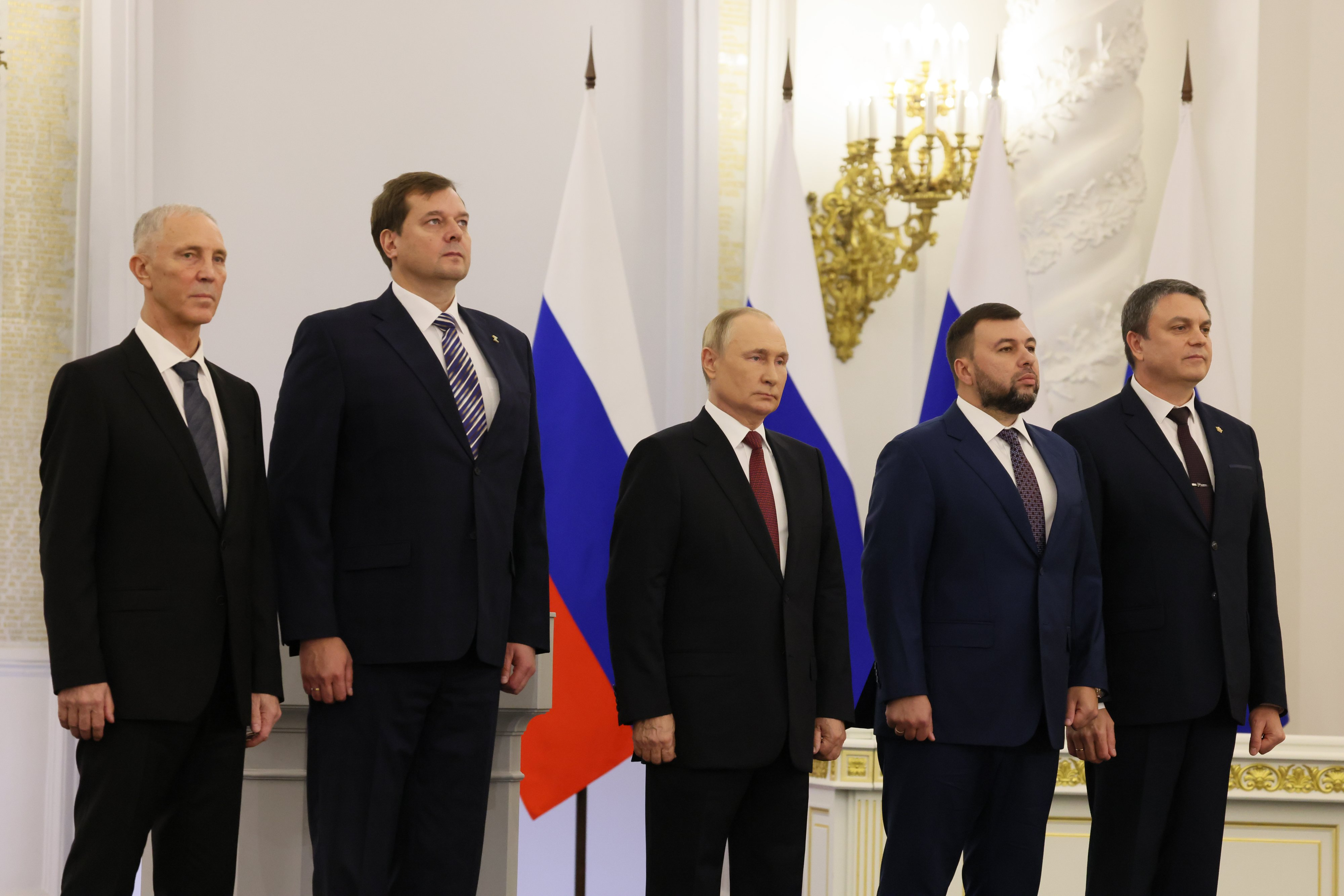
Russian President Vladimir Putin with pro-Russian leaders of the annexed territories on 30 September 2022

Volodymyr Saldo, the mayor of Kherson between 2002 and 2012, and a supporter of repressions against the opposition in 2014, became the head of the occupation administration of the Kherson region. In the local elections in 2020, Saldo lost to Ihor Kolykhaiev, and his party received only 7% of the vote in the regional council and 11% in the regional one. After the occupation in March 2022, Saldo became one of the founders of the collaborationist Salvation Committee for Peace and Order, and a month later, the Russian military seized the city council of Kherson and appointed Saldo as the head of the occupation administration.

The city administration of Kherson was headed by Oleksandr Kobets, whom the Ukrainian media called the former driver of the legally elected mayor Kolykhaiev. Other members of the Salvation Committee include Kirill Stremousov, a pro-Russian far-right blogger and anti-vaxxer, who won 1.3% of the vote in the 2020 Kherson mayoral elections. Other members of the committee were associated with the movement of the oligarch, Vladimir Putin's godfather Viktor Medvedchuk, the banned Communist Party of Ukraine and various pro-Russian organizations, had problems with the Ukrainian special services.

In Kakhovka, the Russian military seized the city council on 1 April and appointed Pavel Filipchuk, a former deputy of the Kherson regional council from the pro-Russian Opposition Platform - For Life!, as the head of the city occupation administration. (OPLE), who was part of the team of the chairman of the regional council Vladislav Manger, suspected of involvement in the murder of Kherson activist Kateryna Handziuk. After a series of unsuccessful attempts to be elected mayor of Kakhovka, Filipchuk moved to Sochi and returned shortly after the invasion began. Oleg Bukhovets, an ex-deputy of the district council from the Party of Regions, was appointed head of the city's "police". The leadership of the community noted that the employees of the city executive committee refused to cooperate with Russian appointees.

On 12 March, in Henichesk, the Russian military ousted the legally elected mayor and appointed Gennady Sivak from Kramsk as the head of the occupation administration. Andriy Klochko, a deputy of the district council from the Opposition Platform For Life party, a former activist of Viktor Medvedchuk's Ukrainian Choice organization, became the city's chairman. Andriy Klochko, a member of the Henichesk District Council from OPZZ, was appointed "acting mayor" in Henichesk. Of the 15 headmen of the Henichesk district, only five went to cooperate with the Russian military. Nova Kakhovka under Russian administration was headed by a small entrepreneur Volodymyr Leontiev, and Skadovsk was headed by a Russian citizen Sergei Shvaiko, who previously worked as a builder.

The Washington Post reported that the Ukrainian authorities after the capture of Kherson faced problems related to ambivalent attitude or even sympathy towards Russia among many residents: some of them fled the city when Russian troops retreated, reducing the human resource for rebuilding the city, while the other part stayed behind and, according to the Washington Post, it is unknown what should be done with them. Thus, according to the newspaper, some locals received Russian passports in order to receive benefits, while others received Russian wage supplements for agreeing to continue working. This situation has led to social tensions and conflicts

=== Mykolaiv ===
In May 2022, the head of the Mykolaiv District Prosecutor's Office was detained by the SBU for passing on to an unnamed Russian blogger, whose fan he was, data on captive Russian servicemen, military and civilian casualties, and passwords for moving around the region.

=== Zaporizhzhia ===
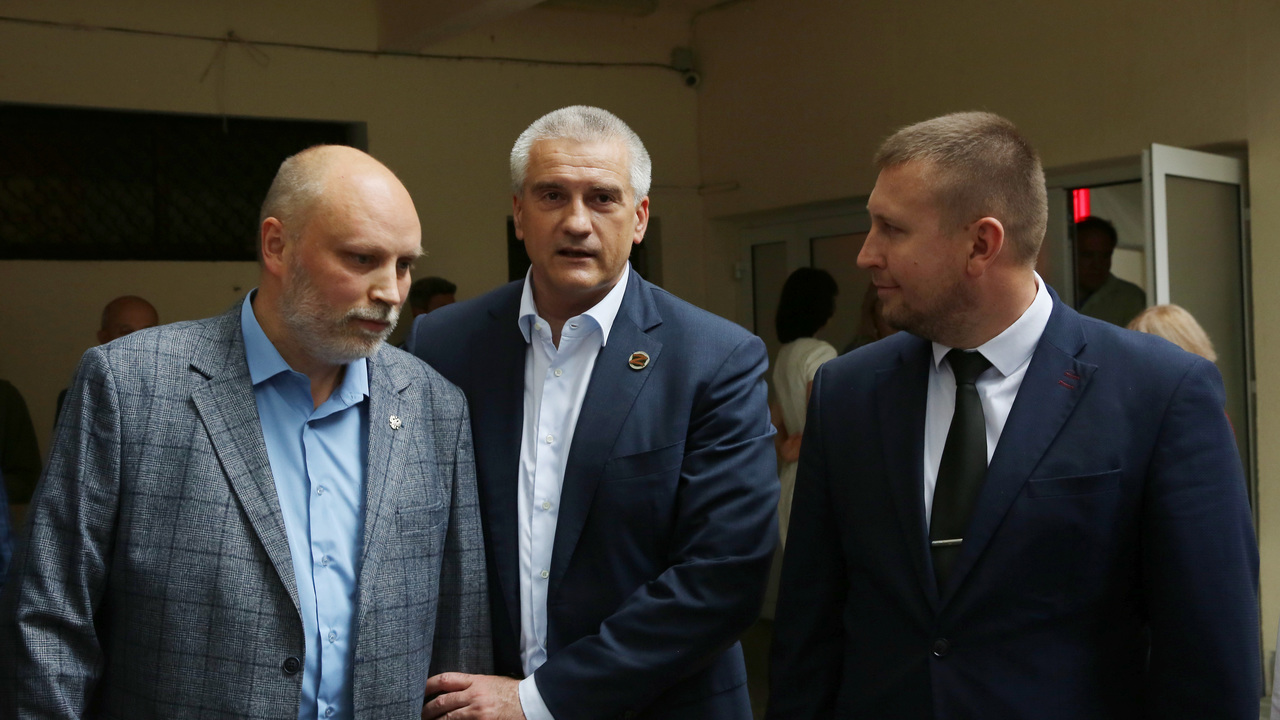
Vladimir Rogov, Russian head of Crimea Sergey Aksyonov and Denis Miroshnichenko from LPR

According to Meduza's estimates, key posts in the occupation administrations in Zaporizhzhia Oblast have been occupied by people unknown even to local residents. So in March 2022 (under the current Ukrainian authorities), Vladimir Rogov, a radical pro-Russian activist and former ally of Oleg Tsarev, who ended up in Russia as part of a prisoner exchange in 2014, proclaimed himself Mayor of Melitopol.

After the legally elected mayor Ivan Fedorov was kidnapped by the Russian military in Melitopol, his acting Galina Danilchenko was appointed - a deputy of the City Council from the pro-Russian "Party of Regions", and then the "Opposition Bloc". She also became the first civil servant who was formally charged with collaborationism.

The Russian military then formed the government in the city under the leadership of former People's Deputy Yevgeny Balitsky, Melitopol city council members Oleksandr Falk and Galina Danilchenko (who formally headed the city's "committee of people's elected officials"). In Enerhodar, a parallel government body, the "Public Council of Self-Organization of the City," was created under the leadership of city council member Andriy Shevchyk. In Berdiansk, a representative of the Union of Left Forces party, Oleksandr Saulenko, took on the "temporary duties of the mayor" and declared himself the "People's Mayor" of Berdiansk. A criminal case was initiated against Volodymyr Rykun, the head of Mykhailo community of Zaporizhzhia region, who stated that he went to the negotiations with the Russian military.

In July 2022, the political party We Are Together with Russia was created, with the purpose of campaigning for Zaporizhzhia's annexation into the Russian Federation.

=== Kharkiv ===
In September 2022, the Pavel Sudoplatov Battalion was formed. The battalion consists of pro-Russian Ukrainians and foreign volunteers. It is allied with the Russian-installed authorities in occupied Zaporizhzhia Oblast; it's led by Yevgeny Balitsky, whose son is a member of the battalion. As of January 2023 the battalion consists of over 600 soldiers.

The mayor of Kupiansk, Kharkiv Oblast, Hennadiy Matsegora, went to the side of the Russian Federation. The head of Balakliia, Ivan Stolbovy, agreed to cooperate with the Russian authorities. On 28 February 2022, Oleksandr Bryukhanov, the mayor of Pivdenne, was detained on suspicion of treason. Mayor of Izium Valery Marchenko reported that two deputies of the city council and the ex-mayor had gone over to the side of the occupiers. According to one of the Izium City Council officials, Anatoly Fomichevsky, a deputy from the OP-ZZh, helped the Russian military enter the city along an unprotected road.

=== Luhansk ===
In Luhansk Oblast, the Russian military was supported by the mayor of Stanytsia Luhanska, Albert Zinchenko, the mayor of Rubizhne, Serhiy Khortiv, the head of the Markivka community Ihor Dzyuba, the head of the village of Milove Oleh Savchenko, and the head of the Svatove District Council Lyudmila Rusanova.

=== Donetsk ===
In Mariupol, Donetsk region, which was partially controlled by the Russian military, 10 Mariupol city councillors, one Lyman city councillor, the deputy of the city council from the party "Opposition Platform — For Life" Kostyantyn Ivashchenko, along with nine representatives of the party, agreed to cooperate. The mayor of Sviatohirsk, Volodymyr Bandura, have also agreed to cooperate with the Russian military during this time. In Volnovakha during the first months of the occupation, the Russian military replaced four leaders of the city, in May 2022 this position was occupied by a former security official, businessman and MP from the Opposition Platform for Life, Artur Antsiferov.

== Scale ==
The first case of collaborationism was sent to court on 30 March 2022, where a resident of Kramatorsk published a video in TikTok in which he denied the fact of the Russian invasion and called to support the actions of the aggressor country. By mid-October 2022, Ukrainian law enforcement agencies had opened more than 2,000 cases, and courts had handed down 116 verdicts. Most of the cases reflected in the official register concerned denial of Russian aggression, another part concerned officials' cooperation with the occupiers, and only a few concerned active assistance to the Russian military (for example, transmitting information about AFU positions).

In the vast majority of cases, the defendants pleaded guilty and received minimal punishment - suspended sentences, a ban on holding elective positions and certain types of activities. Representatives of the legal community noted that such punishment for the lightest forms of collaborationism was apparently intended as a kind of lustration to exclude collaborators from politics and local government in the future.

On 16 March 2022, the movement "launched" the database of traitors of Ukraine "DerzhZradnyky". As of 4 April 2022, it contained 70 names. On 19 March 2022, the National Anti-Corruption Bureau of Ukraine reported that it had data on 245 people who may be helping Russia. As of 26 March 2022, the State Bureau of Investigation opened about 200 cases for collaborationism.

On 3 April 2022, the Prosecutor General of Ukraine Irina Venediktova announced that 99 people were in custody on suspicion of treason and four people on suspicion of collaborationism. On 7 April 2022, National Security and Defense Council Secretary Oleksiy Danilov said that on behalf of President Zelenskyy, work was underway on a register of collaborators, which would soon be published. The first traitors were included in the register on 12 April.

By August 2024, Ukraine's SBU had opened more than 9,000 criminal proceedings related to collaboration with Russia, and nearly 2,000 Ukrainians had been convicted.

=== State authorities ===
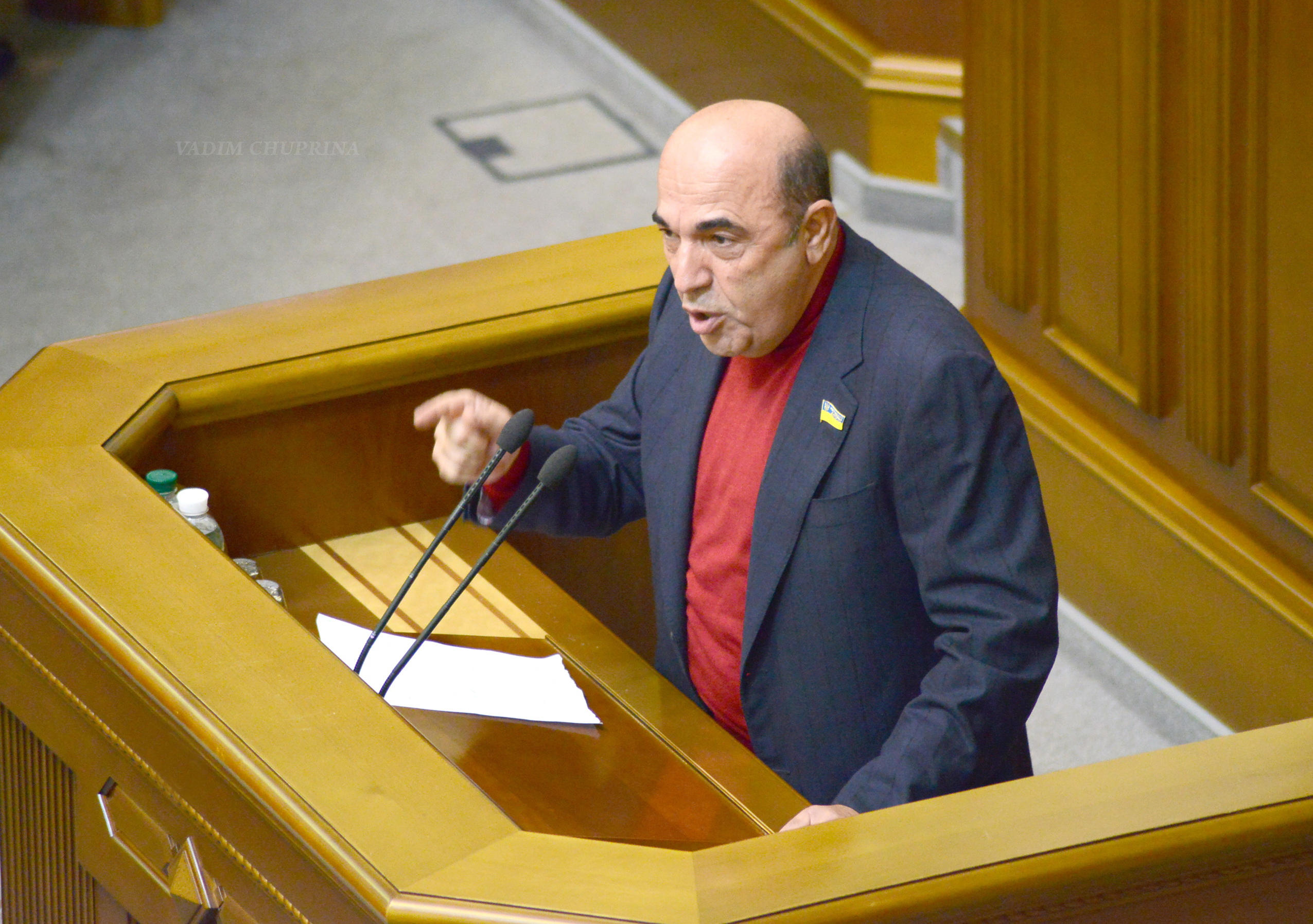
Vadim Rabinovich, a pro-Russian former lawmaker of Ukraine's Verkhovna Rada, was charged with state treason

The invasion was supported by a People's Deputy from the already banned pro-Russian party Opposition Platform — For Life, Ilya Kiva, calling for "liberation of Ukraine from Western occupation." A number of MPs from the including anyone affiliated with businessman and Vladimir Putin's close friend, Viktor Medvedchuk, left Ukraine even before the invasion started: they are Oleg Voloshyn, Vadim Rabinovich, Nataliya Korolevska, Igor Surkis. Some, like Ilya Kiva, moved to Russia. Medvedchuk himself, who escaped House arrest, which was a restrictive measure for treason and attempted plunder of national resources in annexed Crimea, was arrested on 12 April 2022 while trying to leave Ukraine. On 6 March 2022, the Prosecutor General of Ukraine Iryna Venediktova announced her suspicions of Kiva. On 15 March 2022, 335 deputies voted for his expulsion. He is currently wanted for treason.

In July 2022, Zelenskyy dismissed the heads of two key agencies – the Prosecutor General Iryna Venediktova and the head of the SBU Ivan Bakanov. The reason was the large number of collaborators in both agencies, including high-ranking security officials such as Kulinich or Andrei Naumov, the former head of the internal security chief who fled on the eve of the invasion and was soon detained in Serbia on money laundering charges. In the ensuing reshuffles, Zelenskyy replaced heads of the SBU in Zhytomyr, Kharkiv, Sumy, Poltava, Zakarpattia and Dnipropetrovsk regions.

On 15 September 2023, the Security Service of Ukraine charged former MP Nestor Shufrych for treason and collaboration with Russian intelligence.

=== Security agency ===
The Washington Post noted that the FSB unit in Ukraine began expanding in 2019 and was actively recruiting supporters (both ideologues and those working for money) in security agencies. It was believed that the corruption and deep infiltration of Russian agents in the SBU would undermine Ukraine's ability to resist invasion. Some of them complied with the agreements: for example, SBU head for Crimea Oleg Kulinich handed over internal SBU files to Russia for two years and, on the night before the invasion, blocked the distribution of intelligence that an attack on the Kherson region from Crimea would begin in a few hours.

After 24 February, however, many of the enlisted enforcers refused to carry out FSB missions. Moreover, when the invasion began, the Ukrainian security agencies began to work much more efficiently – among other things, the personal example of Volodymyr Zelenskyy, who remained in the capital, where the fighting was taking place, contributed to this. During the large-scale purges in February–August 2022, more than 800 officers of law enforcement agencies up to generals were detained in more than 650 cases of treason (the conspiracy uncovered in April was reported by the Secretary of the National Security and Defense Council, Oleksiy Danilov).

=== Civilian population ===
According to the Mayor of Melitopol, Ivan Fedorov, some apartment building managers provide the Russian military with lists of empty apartments.

Immediately after the seizure of the village of Dymer in Kyiv Oblast, a local resident, Oleksandr Kharchenko, headed the collaboration administration. After the retreat of Russian troops from Kyiv Oblast, Oleg Tsarev wrote the following: "I spent more than a month mainly in the settlements belonging to the district centers near Kyiv, Borodyanka and Ivankiv. Now the Russian army has left these settlements. I hope that all those who started to cooperate with us from the local residents have managed to leave Ukraine".

In December 2022, one Ukrainian artillerymen alleged that "80 percent" of the remaining civilian population of Bakhmut, surviving in basements and supplied by mobile grocery trucks that periodically enter the city, was pro-Russian.

Among the civilians tried for collaboration with Russia in the liberated territories of Ukraine is a local neighborhood volunteer sentenced to five years in prison for cooperating with the Russian authorities in providing humanitarian needs to local elderly people, a school principal jailed for accepting a Russian curriculum, a local electrician who provided electricity during the occupation, or sports stadium manager facing 12 years in prison for continuing to host friendly matches between local teams while under Russian occupation.

Danielle Bell, the head of the UN's Human Rights Monitoring Mission in Ukraine, said that in many cases the 2022 collaboration laws were "applied unfairly" and there are "countless examples where people have acted under duress and performed functions to simply survive." Ukrainian human rights expert Onysiya Syniuk said the collaboration laws are too broad and include "all kinds of activities, including those which don't harm national security."

=== Church organization ===
On 1 December 2022, Zelenskyy said that the government was preparing a draft law banning religious organizations linked to centres of influence in the Russian Federation from operating in Ukraine. In particular, this applies to the Ukrainian Orthodox Church of the Moscow Patriarchate, which is considered affiliated with the Russian Orthodox Church. Earlier the SBU reported that during a search in a monastery of the Moscow Patriarchate in Zakarpattia Region, it found a large amount of materials which were considered propaganda. According to The Kyiv Independent, the SBU searched several churches of the Ukrainian Orthodox Church over the past week. Zelenskyy's statement was made while addressing the 31st anniversary of Ukraine's vote for independence from the Soviet Union.

== Assassination attempts and deaths of collaborators ==
=== Before February 2022 ===
On 1 January 2015, in Lutuhyne, the motorcade of Oleksandr Bednov, who served as the Minister of Defense of the "LPR" in August 2014 and was later named Chief of Staff of the 4th Motorized Rifle Brigade, was burned with flamethrowers.

On 23 January 2015, Yevhen Ishchenko, who was the "mayor" of the occupied city of Pervomaysk, was killed by unidentified persons during the shelling of his car on the Pervomaysk-Lysychansk highway. Three other volunteers from Russia were killed along with him.

On 15 April 2015, Oleg Kalashnikov, a former MP from the Party of Regions, died of a gunshot wound at the door of his apartment at 31 Pravdy Avenue between 19 and 19.20 pm. He was involved in the organization of Anti-Maidan and the beating of peaceful demonstrators during the Revolution of Dignity.

On 12 December 2015, Pavel Dremov, the "ataman" of the Don Cossacks unit, was blown up by explosives planted in the car while on his way to celebrate his wedding in a car stolen from a local businessman.

In September 2016, the occupation authorities arrested Gennadiy Tsypkalov, the head of the "LPR Council of Ministers," in Luhansk in a case of attempted coup d'état. A few days after his arrest, Tsypkalov was found hanging in the cell where he was being held. According to the official version of the LPR Prosecutor General's Office, Tsypkalov committed suicide, and that the reason for this could be that he "realized the depth of his criminal actions."

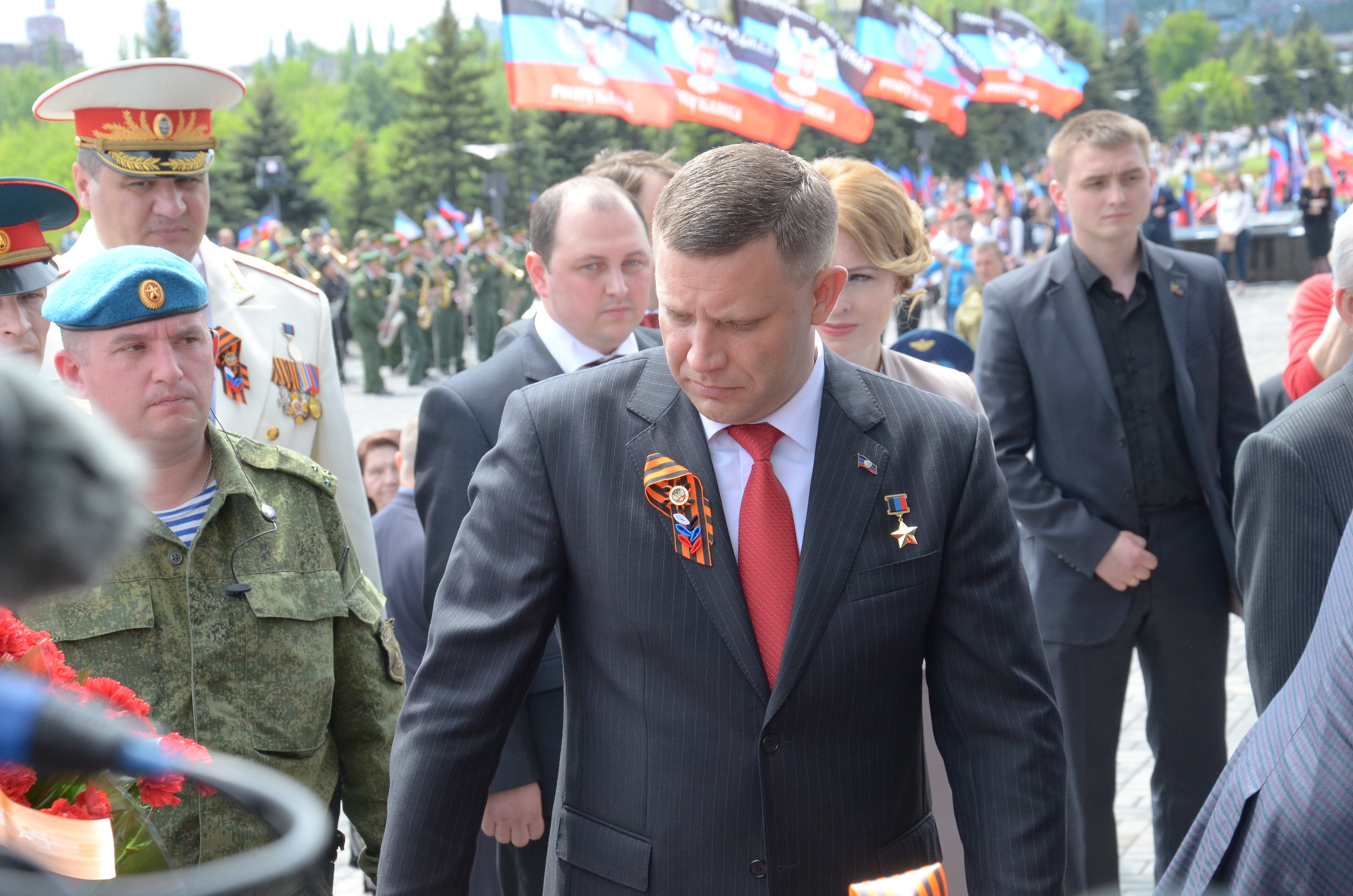
Alexander Zakharchenko, the leader of Russian-backed separatists of the self-proclaimed Donetsk People's Republic, 9 May 2016

On 4 February 2017, Oleg Anashchenko, the head of the department of the so-called "People's Militia of the LPR", was killed in Luhansk as a result of a car bombing in the city center.

On 19 January 2018, Valentyn Doroshenko, an active participant in the so-called "Russian Spring" of 2014 in Odesa and the leader of the "Stalin Party", was killed by police officers in a shootout on Novoselsky Street. He was known throughout the city for challenging the then-mayor Eduard Hurvits to a duel in the summer of 2009.

On 31 August 2018, a bomb explosion in the Separ cafe in Donetsk killed the Prime Minister of the self-proclaimed Donetsk People's Republic Alexander Zakharchenko.

On 24 October 2020, Lieutenant Colonel Oleksiy Markov (call sign "Dobryi"), a commander of the Prizrak Brigade, died in an accident in Luhansk.

=== After February 2022 ===
Collaborationist officials and law enforcement officers have become a priority target for guerrillas operating in contact with Ukrainian security services. The main purpose of such operations is not to kill, but to warn of the consequences of cooperation with the Russian military.

Former People's Deputy of Ukraine Illia Kyva was shot dead in the village of Suponevo, to the west of Moscow, on 6 December 2023. Several Ukrainian media outlets, citing unnamed sources, claimed that Kyva was targeted by the Security Service of Ukraine (SBU).

==== Kyiv Oblast ====
Date	Name	Role	Event
5 March 2022	Denys Kireyev (†)	Member of the negotiation delegation and Intelligence agent of the Main Directorate of Intelligence (GUR) who first warned of an imminent attack on Antonov Airport, hours before the invasion	Shot in the back of the head by the Security Service of Ukraine (SBU), who concluded that he was a traitor. The Ukrainian Ministry of Defence's Directorate of Intelligence subsequently confirmed Kireyev's death in a Facebook post, but asserted that he was an intelligence operative for Ukraine who died in the line of duty on a "special mission." In January 2023, Zelenskyy's advisor Mykhailo Podolyak said that Kireyev's death was a tragic mistake due to "poor coordination" between the GUR and the SBU.
11 March 2022	Dmytro Demyanenko (†)	Former deputy head of the SBU of the Kyiv Region and framed as a member of the Russian Sabotage and Reconnaissance Group (DRG)	Died in an accidental shootout in a car in Kyiv

==== Kherson Oblast ====
Date	Name	Role	Event
20 March 2022	Pavel Slobodchikov (†)	Assistant to the head of the occupation administration of the Kherson Oblast, Volodymyr Saldo	Shot in a car near his house in Kherson
20 April 2022	Valery Kuleshov (†)	Blogger, assistant to the deputy head of the occupation administration Kirill Stremousov	Shot in a car in Kherson
18 June 2022	Yevgeny Sobolev	Head of the regional penitentiary service under the occupation administration	Injured in a bomb explosion in Kherson
22 June 2022	Yuri Turulev	Head of the occupation administration of Chornobaivka	Injured in a bomb explosion in Chernobaevka
24 June 2022	Dmitry Savluchenko (†)	Head of the department of family, youth and sports in the occupational administration of the Kherson Oblast	Died in a car bombing in Kherson
7 July 2022	Serhii Tomko (†)	Deputy chief of the police of Nova Kakhovka	Shot in a car in Nova Kakhovka
3 August 2022	Volodymyr Saldo	Head of the occupation administration of the Kherson Oblast	Poisoned, hospitalized in the Research Institute of Emergency Medicine Sklifosovsky
6 August 2022	Vitaly Guru (†)	Deputy Head of the Central Administrative Agency and Occupation administration in Nova Kakhovka	Shot dead in his home
22 August 2022	Ihor Telehin	Head of the Department of Internal Policy in the Occupation Administration	Injured in a car explosion in Kherson
29 August 2022	Oleksiy Kovalyov (†)	Deputy Head of the Occupation Administration for Agriculture	Shot in the head at his home in Hola Pristan
12 September 2022	Tamara Tomilina	Rector of Kherson State University appointed by the occupying authorities	Injured in an explosion in her house in Kherson
12 October 2022	Andrei Shevchik	Deputy head of the village of Bilozerka	Injured in explosion
9 November 2022	Kirill Stremousov (†)	Politician and blogger who served as the deputy head of the Kherson occupation administration	Died in a car crash near Henichesk
12 December 2022	Vitaly Bulyuk	Regional Council Deputy from Our Land party pre-war, installed as Deputy Head of the Kherson Region for Economics, Financial and Budgetary Policy, Agriculture, Revenue and Fees.	Injured in a car explosion
22 December 2022	Andrey Shtepa (†)	Former Village Candidate from the "UKROP" party, installed as "Head of Luibymivka Community".	Died in a car bombing near a Soviet monument in Kakhovka.
1 October 2025	Volodymyr Leontiev (†)	Head of the occupation administration of Nova Kakhovka since April 2022.	Killed by a Baba Yaga drone while entering a building in Nova Kakhovka.

Several collaborating officials from Kherson were injured as a result of targeted attacks by the HIMARS MLRS: the head of the labor department was injured when the building of the regional administration was hit on 16 September, the former deputy of the Verkhovna Rada from the "Party of Regions" Oleksiy Zhuravko – during the shelling of the hotel building, the first deputy head of the regional occupation administration for security – as a result of an accurate hit on his house.

==== Zaporizhzhia Oblast ====
Date	Name	Role	Event
5 March 2022	Taras Hordienko (†)	Lieutenant of the People's Militia of the DPR and commander of the 1st reconnaissance platoon.	Died during the offensive on Mariupol.
22 May 2022	Andrey Shevchik	Ex-deputy from the pro-Russian party OP-ZZh, self-proclaimed mayor of Enerhodar	Injured in an explosion at the entrance of his house in Enerhodar
11 July 2022	Andrey Siguta	Head of the occupation administration of the Melitopol Raion	Shot in his house in Melitopol, was not injured
12 August 2022	Oleg Shostak	Responsible for media policy in the occupation administration, head of the election headquarters of United Russia	Injured his buttocks as a result of the explosion
24 August 2022	Ivan Sushko (†)	Head of the occupation administration of the village of Mikhailovka	Injured in a car bombing, succumbed to death at the hospital
26 August 2022	Oleksandr Koliesnikov (†)	Deputy head of the traffic police at the occupation administration of Berdiansk	Injured in an explosion near his car, succumbed to death from shrapnel wounds at the hospital
6 September 2022	Artem Bardin (†)	Commandant of the Russian-occupied city of Berdiansk	Lost both of his legs in the explosion of his car near the building of the city administration of Berdiansk by the Berdiansk Partisan Army, succumbed to death at the hospital
16 September 2022	Oleg Boyko (†)	Deputy Head of the occupational administration of Berdiansk for housing and communal services	Killed near his garage in Berdiansk
16 September 2022	Lyudmila Boyko (†)	Head of the territorial election commission for holding a referendum on the entry of the Zaporizhzhia region into Russia	Killed near her garage in Berdiansk
1 November 2022	Pavlo Ishchuk	Former Chief Editor of a Local Newspaper, installed as Deputy Head of Berdiansk Administration in Regards to Foreign Policy and Mass Communication	Injured by an explosive device stuffed with metal balls and nails planted in his car.
15 November 2022	Dmitry Trukhin	Former member of the city council and director of communal property	Injured in an explosion in his condo in Kherson
13 & 16 January 2023	Alexei Kichigin (†)	"LNR official" since 2014, installed as the Head of Berdiansk Administration	Injured in a car bombing, died from a series of shelling
24 January 2023	Valentyna Mamai (†)	City Councillor from OPZZh pre-war, Businesswoman and holding low-level "administrative posts"	Died in a car bombing
3 February 2023	Yevgeny Kuzmin (†)	Member of Law Enforcement of Enerhodar	Died in a car bombing
4 October 2024	Andrei Korotkiy (†)	Head of security of Russian-controlled Zaporizhia Nuclear Power Plant and former head of the Russian-installed local council of deputies in occupied Enerhodar	Died in a car bombing
20 February 2025	Yevgeny Bogdanov (†)	Deputy head of Berdiansk Administration	Died in a car bombing
18 June 2025	Mykhailo Hrytsai (†)	Deputy Mayor of Berdiansk	Shot by Ukrainian military intelligence.

==== Kharkiv Oblast ====
Date	Name	Role	Event
10 July 2022	Yevgeny Yunakov (†)	Pro-Russian head of the village of Velykyi Burluk	Died as a result of a car explosion near the administration building
13 June 2024	Gennady Matsegora (†)	Former mayor of Kupyansk	Shot near his safe house in western Russia.

==== Luhansk Oblast ====
Date	Name	Role	Event
2 March 2022	Volodymyr Struk (†)	The head of Kremennaya, who defected to the side of the Russian military, is an ex-deputy from the pro-Russian party OP-ZZh	Kidnapped and shot in the head
19 April 2022	Pavel Sharogradsky (†)	A local public figure from Novoaidar, who passed information to the Russian military about activists and veterans of the ATO	Kidnapped, body found with gunshot wounds
16 September 2022	Sergei Gorenko (†)	Attorney General of the LPR, former head of the department of the Main Directorate of the Ministry of Internal Affairs in the Luhansk region (until 2014)	Killed by an explosion in his office in the building of the Prosecutor General's Office (Deputy Prosecutor General Ekaterina Steglenko died with him)
8 November 2023	Mikhail Filiponenko (†)	Member of the People's Council and former soldier	Died in a car bomb explosion.
1 April 2024	Valery Chaika (†)	Russian installed deputy head of the district Center for Services to Educational Organizations in occupied Starobilsk	Died in a car bombing
3 July 2025	Manolis Pilavov (†)	Former mayor of Luhansk	killed in an explosion.

==== Donetsk Oblast ====
Date	Name	Role	Event
3 August 2022	Olga Kachura (†)	Colonel of the Donetsk People's Republic People's Militia and a deputy commander of the 3rd rocket artillery division of the 1st AK	Died as a result of a rocket attack on her car
18 August 2022	Anatoly Brehunets (†)	The mayor of Svitlodarsk who went over to the side of the Russian military. In 2014, he supported the holding of a referendum in the city on 11 May and voted for the creation of the DPR, for which he was prosecuted in February 2020. First he was sent under house arrest, and later to a pre-trial detention center, but released on bail	Died as a result of a rocket attack
20 August 2022	Konstantin Ivashchenko	Head of the occupation administration of Mariupol, ex-deputy from the pro-Russian party OP-ZZh	A homemade bomb exploded at the entrance to the zoo, which he was going to visit
4 November 2022	Aleksandr Nikulin	Judge of the Supreme Court of the DPR	Injured after being shot
9 December 2024	Sergei Yevsyukov (†)	Cheif of Olvenivka prison camp for Ukrainian prisoners of war during the Olenivka prison massacre on 29 July 2022	Died in a car bombing that also left his wife who reportedly lost her leg severely injured

== See also ==
- 2014 pro-Russian unrest in Ukraine
- Russian people's militias in Ukraine
