= Ukrainian collaborators =

Ukrainian collaborators may refer to:

- Ukrainian collaboration with Nazi Germany
- Collaboration with Russia during the Russian invasion of Ukraine
