= Russian occupation of Southern Ukraine =

Russian occupation of Southern Ukraine may refer to:

== Location ==
- Russian occupation of Donetsk Oblast
- Russian occupation of Kherson Oblast — Including Kherson
- Russian occupation of Zaporizhzhia Oblast — Including Berdiansk, Melitopol, and Enerhodar
- Republic of Crimea
