= Russian occupation of Zaporizhzhia Oblast =

Military occupation and annexation by Russia

- Part of the Russo-Ukrainian war (2022–present)
- Territory of Zaporizhzhia Oblast controlled by Russia shown in pink; territory controlled by Ukraine shown in yellow and blue.
| Date | February 2022 – present |
| Location | Zaporizhzhia Oblast, Ukraine |

The ongoing military occupation of Ukraine's Zaporizhzhia Oblast began after Russian forces launched an invasion of mainland Ukraine out of Crimea on 24 February 2022. Russian-controlled parts of the oblast were administered by a Russian military-civilian administration until 30 September 2022, when Russia declared their annexation (widely regarded as illegal and unrecognized internationally) to become a federal subject of Russia.

On 25 February, the city of Melitopol fell under Russian control, followed by Berdiansk the next day. Russian forces besieged the city of Enerhodar, home of the Zaporizhzhia Nuclear Power Plant, then captured it on 4 March. The oblast's capital city of Zaporizhzhia, however, remains under Ukrainian government control.

In May, the Russian government began offering Russian passports to the region's inhabitants. In July, it issued a decree that extended Russian 2022 war censorship laws to the oblast, and included deportation to Russia as a penalty. In September, occupation forces held largely disputed referendums in the occupied areas of Zaporizhzhia and Kherson Oblast to join the Russian Federation. On 27 September, Russian officials claimed that Zaporizhzhia Oblast's referendum passed with 93.11% of voters in favour of joining the Russian Federation. Russia signed an accession treaty with the Russian administration of the region on 30 September 2022. Russia annexed Zaporizhzhia Oblast on 30 September 2022, including parts of the oblast that it did not control at the time. The United Nations General Assembly demanded that Russia "immediately, completely and unconditionally" withdraw, and passed a resolution calling on countries not to recognise what it described as an "attempted illegal annexation".

Melitopol serves as the Russian seat of administration as Russia does not control Zaporizhzhia. In March 2023, Melitopol became the official capital of the Russian-occupied Zaporizhzhia Oblast after the acting head, Yevgeny Balitsky, signed a decree on moving the de jure capital to Melitopol until Zaporizhzhia is captured.

== History ==
=== Initial military occupation (March 2022) ===
Shortly after Russian forces captured Melitopol, residents of the city held a street protest against military occupation. The protestors marched and used their bodies to block a convoy of Russian military vehicles.

On 4 March 2022, the former leader of the Anti-Maidan of Zaporizhzhia, Vladimir Rogov, who calls himself "a member of the Main Council of the Zaporizhzhia Oblast Military-Civilian administration of the Zaporozhye", posted part of the program of "comprehensive financial and economic measures for the economic development of the regions of Ukraine controlled by the Russian Federation" on his Telegram channel. This program was written in its entirety in the newspapers published by the occupying authorities, as well as on 9 March in the public "Military-Civilian Administration of Melitopol". According to the BBC, the program was written in a complex bureaucratic style like that of other similar documents by Russian authorities.

On 10 March, the director of the Melitopol Museum of Local History, Leila Ibragimova, was arrested at her home by Russian forces, and was detained in an unknown location. The next day, Melitopol's mayor, Ivan Fedorov, was abducted by Russian troops for refusing to cooperate with them and continuing to fly a Ukrainian flag in his office. Russian authorities did not comment on Fedorov's disappearance, but the prosecutor's office of the Luhansk People's Republic (a Russian-backed self-proclaimed breakaway state within Ukraine) accused him of "terrorist activities". The mayor of Dniprorudne, Yevhen Matvieyev, was detained by Russian soldiers on 13 March. Matvieyev had participated in a 27 February protest preventing Russian tanks from entering the town.

=== Zaporizhzhia Nuclear Power Plant crisis ===
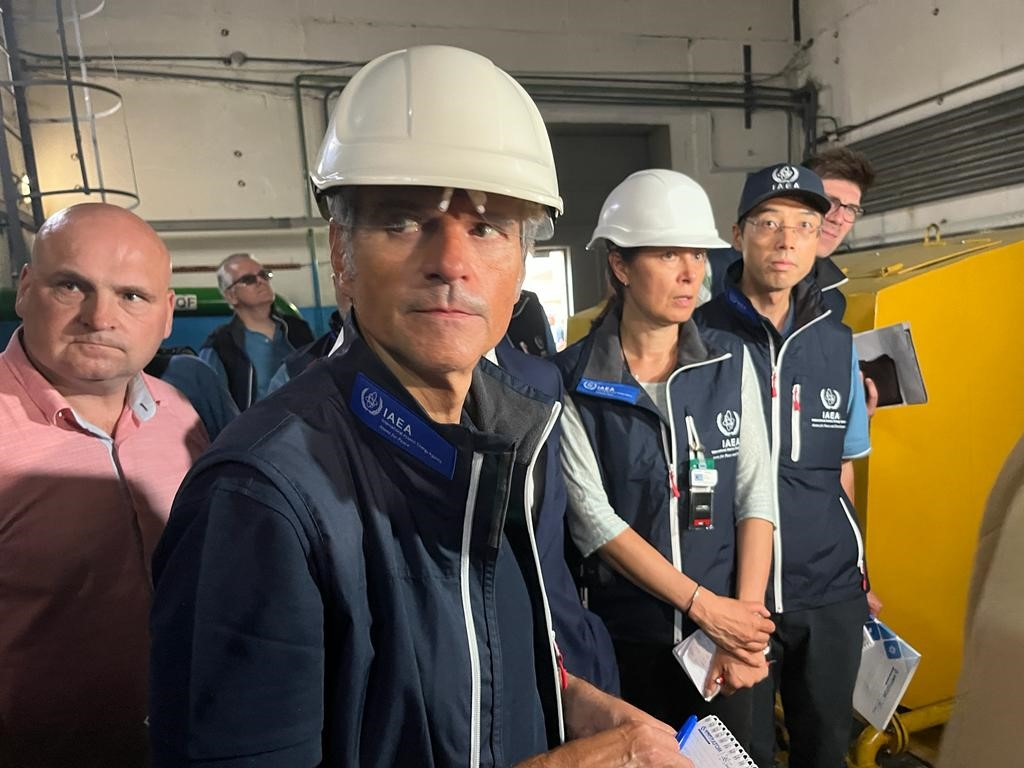
IAEA Director-General Rafael Grossi and other mission team members at the nuclear power plant on 1 September 2022

On 4 March 2022, the city of Enerhodar and the Zaporizhzhia Nuclear Power Plant (ZNPP) came under Russian military occupation. Since then, the ZNPP has been the center of an ongoing nuclear safety crisis. Russia has used the plant as a base to hold military equipment and troops, heightening risk of damage to the plant and a fuel meltdown.

On 6 March 2022, the IAEA released a statement saying that Russian forces were interfering in the operations of the power plant, and "any action of plant management—including measures related to the technical operation of the six reactor units—requires prior approval by the Russian commander," further stating that "Russian forces at the site have switched off some mobile networks and the internet so that reliable information from the site cannot be obtained through the normal channels of communication". On 9 March, Herman Galushchenko, Energy Minister of Ukraine, claimed that Russian forces were holding the workers at the power plant hostage and had forced several to make propaganda videos.

=== Military–civilian administration (March–June 2022) ===
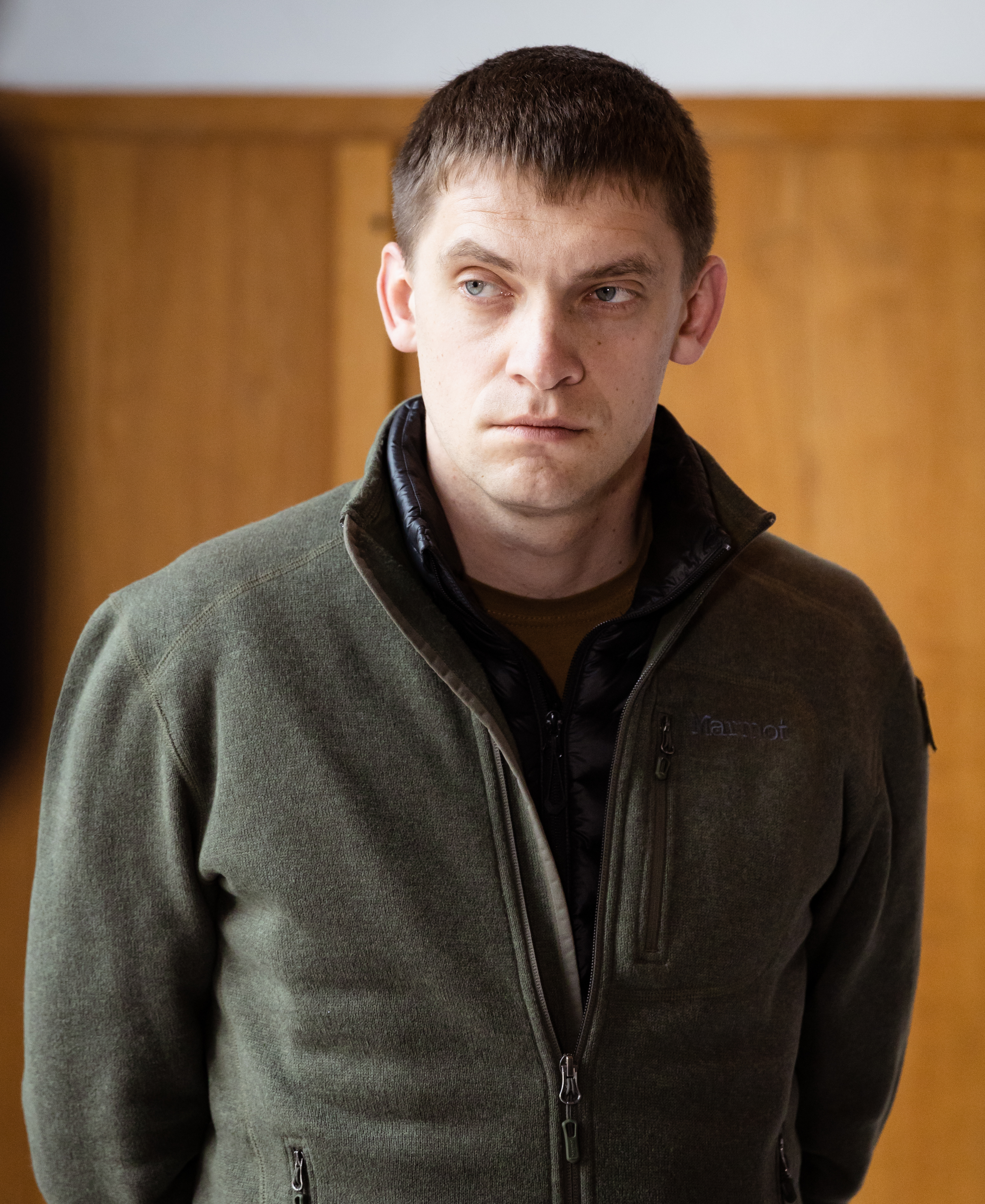
Ivan Fedorov, Ukrainian-recognised Mayor of Melitopol

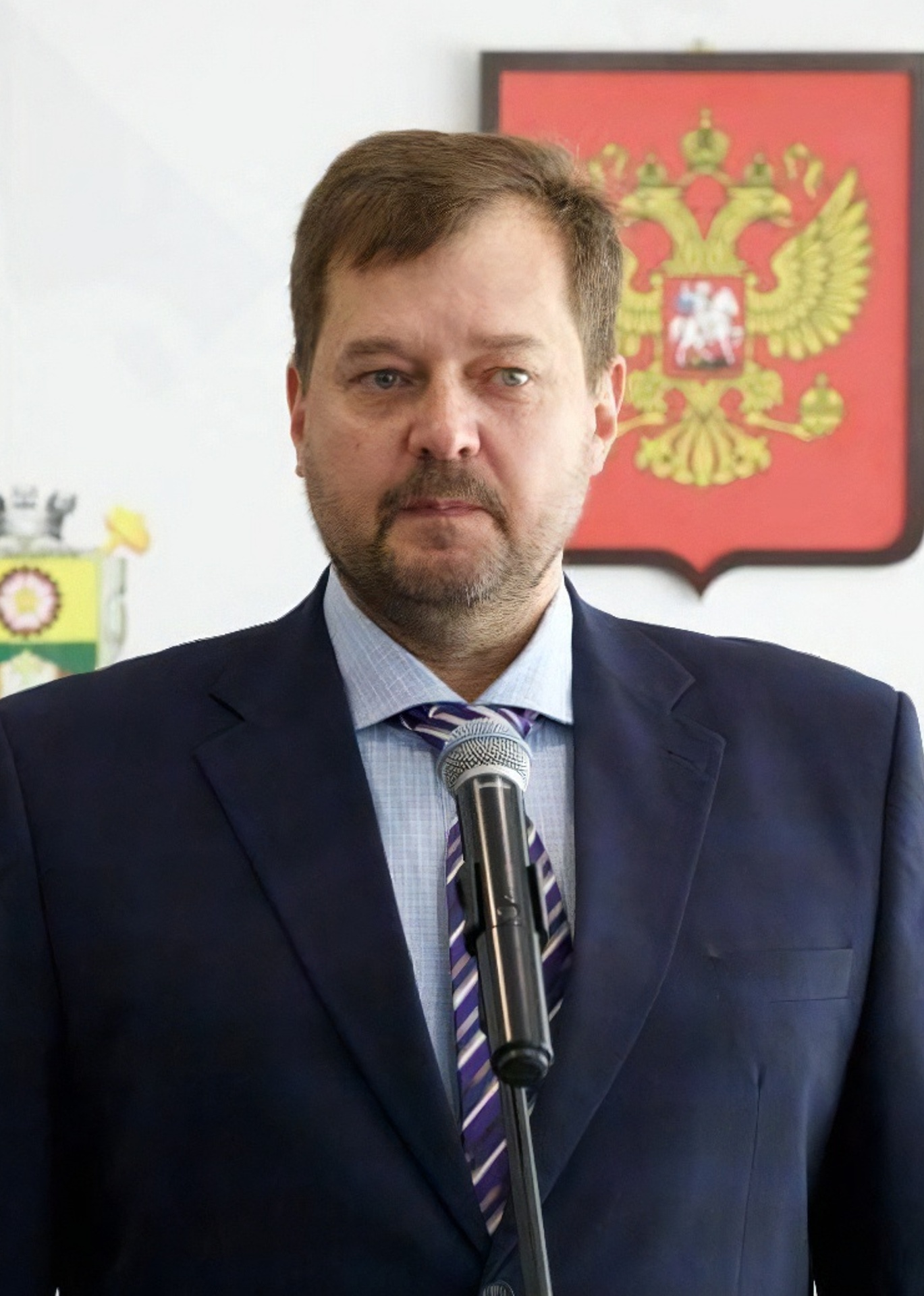
Yevgeny Balitsky, Russian-installed mayor of Melitopol in 2022

The Russians proclaimed Halyna Danylchenko acting mayor of Melitopol on 12 March, but Ukrainian sources said that Yevgeny Balitsky had become the unofficial de facto head of the city. Meanwhile, hundreds of people joined a protest outside Melitopol city hall to demand the release of Fedorov. Olga Gaysumova, head of the non-governmental organization "Conscientious Society of Melitopol" and the organizer of local protests against Russian forces, was arrested. On 13 March, the Melitopol City Council declared that "occupying troops of the Russian Federation are trying to illegally create an occupation administration of the city of Melitopol." It appealed to Prosecutor General of Ukraine Iryna Venediktova, to launch an investigation into Danylchenko and her party Opposition Bloc for treason. Ukrayinska Pravda reported that the Russian military abducted Melitopol's District Council Chairman Serhiy Priyma and tried to abduct City Council Secretary Roman Romanov. Russian military vehicles were seen announcing via loudspeakers that rallies and demonstrations had been prohibited and that a curfew imposed from 6:00 pm to 6:00 am. On 14 March Ukrayinska Pravda reported that Russian forces had prevented new protests by blocking off the central square of Melitopol. It also said "Two activists were abducted and taken away in an unknown direction."

On 16 March, Fedorov was freed from captivity. Some Ukrainian officials said he was freed in a "special operation". Zelenskyy's press aide Daria Zarivna however later said he was exchanged for nine Russian conscripts captured by Ukrainian forces.

On 22 April 2022, Fedorov said that over 100 Russian soldiers had been killed by locals during the occupation of Melitopol. On 24 August 2022, the Russian-appointed head of Mykhailivka, Ivan Sushko, was assassinated in a car bombing.

On 18 May 2022, Deputy Prime Minister of the Russian Federation Marat Khusnullin said during a visit to the region that "the region's prospect is to work in our friendly Russian family," and announced the imminent implementation of plans to launch the maximum turnover of the ruble. According to him, pensions and salaries would be paid to residents of the Zaporizhzhia Oblast in Russian currency within a calendar month. On 23 March 2022, Mayor Fedorov reported that Melitopol was experiencing supply problems with food, medication and fuel, while the Russian military seized businesses, intimidated the local population, and held several journalists.

On 25 May, Vladimir Rogov announced that after the complete capture of the region, it would be annexed by Russia. He also said that a dual-currency zone was introduced in the occupied territory and the coat of arms of Aleksandrovsk from the times of the Russian Empire were installed, with which they began to issue new license plates with the signature "TVR" (a reference to the Taurida Governorate; old numbers are used, but with a "TVR" sticker over the Ukrainian flag). Later a report revealed that Balitsky still sometimes used the Ukrainian coat of arms of Zaporizhzhia Oblast on documentation. The same day, Russian President Vladimir Putin issued a decree to simplify provision of Russian passports to residents of Zaporizhzhia Oblast, under the same procedure as the population of Donetsk and Luhansk Oblasts.

=== Annexation by Russia (July 2022–present) ===
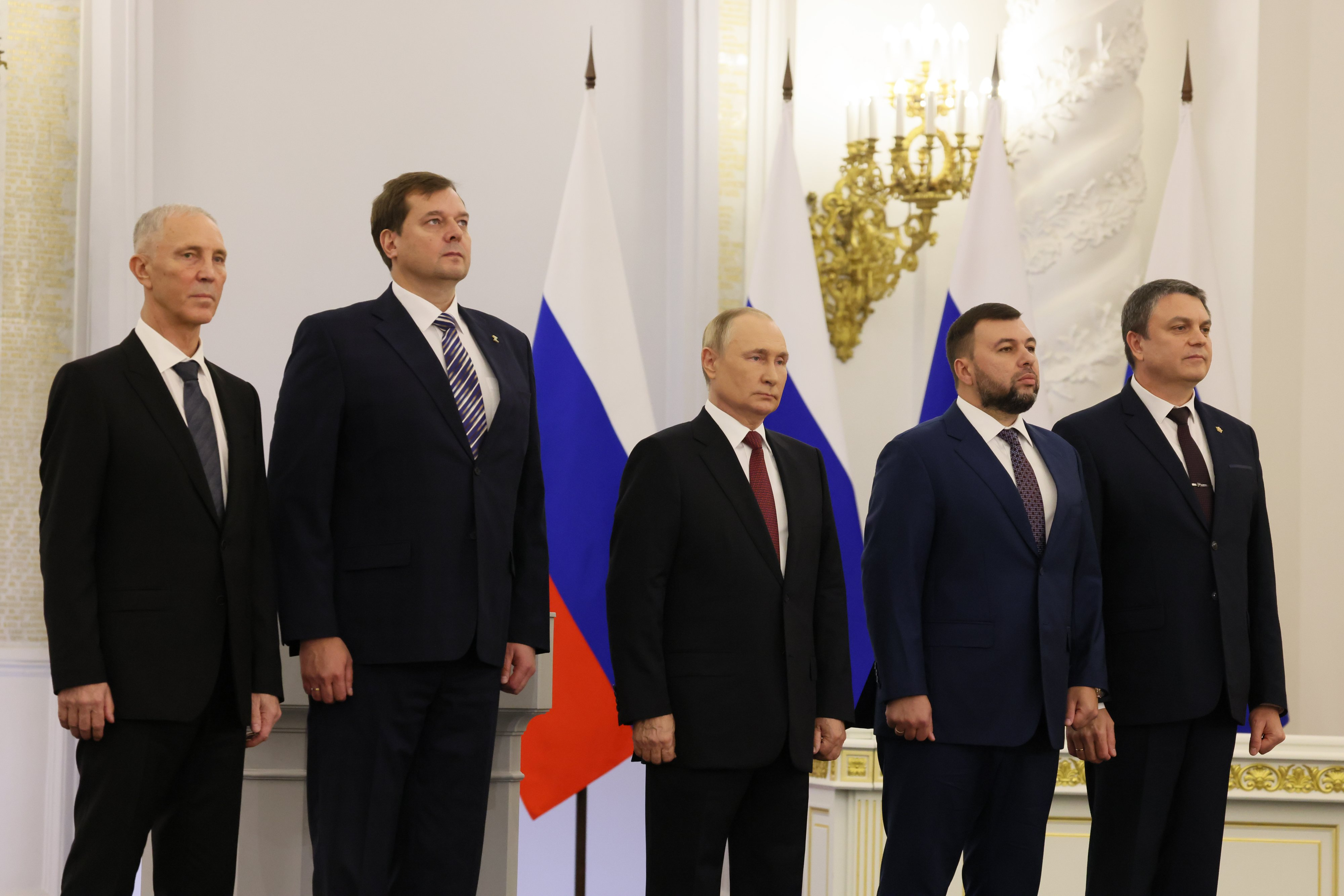
Russian President Vladimir Putin with pro-Russian leaders of the occupied territories on 30 September 2022

On 28 July, Meduza reported that temporary departments of the Ministry of Internal Affairs of the Russian Federation had been set up in the Kherson and Zaporizhzhia oblasts.

On 8 August, Balitsky announced that a referendum on "reunification" with Russia in the region, and signed the order of the Central Election Commission. The commission, according to the statement, began to form as early as 23 July. On 8 September 2022, it was announced that referendums would be held in all the occupied territories of Ukraine from 23 to 27 September, the purpose of which was the annexation of these territories. According to the military–civilian administration, 93.11% of voters in the referendum voted for the region to become part of Russia. Balitsky said that "Zaporizhzhia Oblast de facto separated from Ukraine". On 28 September, the Zaporizhzhia military–civilian administration announced the secession of the region from Ukraine. Russia did not control the entire oblast at the time of the referendum, and it was widely dismissed as a sham referendum by international observers. It was also condemned as illegal in international law by the United Nations. On 29 September, Vladimir Putin recognized the Kherson and Zaporizhzhia regions as independent countries, hours before signing a decree on the annexation of all four regions.

In September 2022, the administration founded the Pavel Sudoplatov Battalion, a pro-Russian volunteer militia.

In spring and summer 2023, Russian forces heavily fortified areas near major cities in Zaporizhzhia Oblast in anticipation of the 2023 Ukrainian counteroffensive. On 8–10 September 2023, the 2023 Russian elections took place in the occupied Ukrainian territories, which Melitopol mayor Ivan Fedorov described as "hellish pseudo-elections". During this period, on 9 September, Fedorov reported that the headquarters of United Russia – the Russian ruling party – in the small city of Polohy was blown up. Fedorov alluded to casualties among the occupation authorities, stating on Telegram that "Some went to the hospital, and some went straight to the morgue".

In a 2024 interview, occupation head Yevgeny Balitsky said that Russian occupation authorities had "expelled a large number of families...who did not support the ‘special military operation’". He claimed that the deportation of families was good for them, because otherwise occupation authorities would have to "deal" with them in a "harsher" manner in the future. Balitsky said that authorities had to make "extremely harsh decisions that he will not be talking about", possibly alluding to Russian occupation forces summarily executing Ukrainian civilians, according to ISW.

== Government and politics ==
Voters in Russian controlled parts of Zaporizhzhia were encouraged to vote in the 2024 Russian presidential election. For the 2026 Russian legislative elections to the State Duma, a separate Zaporizhzhia single‑mandate electoral district (No.93) was created and won by Alexey Tikhomirov.

== Administrative divisions ==
The administrative divisions of the Military-Civilian administration until September 2022.

In August 2022, the Zaporizhzhia Military–Civilian Administration divided the oblast into five districts: On 3 March 2023, the regional government approved a law on administrative divisions, subdividing the de facto controlled areas into 3 cities of oblast significance and 13 districts.

The cities are Melitopol, Berdiansk, and Energodar. The districts are Akymovka, Berdiansk, Vasylievka, Veseloye, Kamenka-Dneprovskaya, Kuibyshevo, Melitopol, Mykhailovka, Pology, Pryazovskoye, Prymorsk, Tokmak, and Chernigovka.

Before September 2022
| Flag | Coat of arms | Name | Control |
|---|---|---|---|
| | | Berdiansky District | Russia |
| | | Melitopolsky District | Russia |
| | | Pologovsky District | Contested |
| | | Vasilievsky District | Contested |
| | | Zaporozhsky District | Ukraine |

| After 2023 | | | | | |
| No. | Urban Districts | | | | |
| No. | Flag | Coat of Arms | | Name | |
|---|---|---|---|---|---|
| 1 | | | Sergey Zolotarev | Melitopol Urban District | Russia |
| 2 | | | Andrey Kovganko | Berdyansk Urban District | Russia |
| 3 | | | Maxim Pukhov | Energodar Urban District | Russia |
| | Municipal Districts | | | | |
| | Flag | Coat of arms | | Name | |
| 1 | | | Alexander Trudonoshin | Akimovsky Municipal District | Russia |
| 2 | | | N/A | Berdyansk Municipal District | Russia |
| 3 | | | Natalia Romanichenko | Vasilievsky Municipal District | Contested |
| 4 | | | Natalia Ivanova | Kamensko-Dneprovsky Municipal District | Russia |
| 5 | | | Evgeny Kondrakhin | Veselovsky Municipal District | Russia |
| 6 | | | Kirill Belov | Kuibyshevsky Municipal District | Russia |
| 7 | N/A | | N/A | Melitopol Municipal District | Russia |
| 8 | | | Vyacheslav Bednyak | Mikhailovsky Municipal District | Russia |
| 9 | | | Alexey Salmin | Pologovsky Municipal District | Contested |
| 10 | N/A | TBA | Alexey Dikovchenko | Priazovsky Municipal District | Russia |
| 11 | N/A | TBA | Vladimir Prokopenko | Primorsky Municipal District | Russia |
| 12 | | | Alexander Kalmykov | Tokmaksky Municipal District | Contested |
| 13 | | | N/A | Chernigovsky Municipal District | Russia |

== Transport ==
In the Russian-controlled areas, the railway system is now operated by Railways of Novorossiya.

== War crimes ==
An October 2025 UN report confirmed Russian forces deported civilians from the occupied Zaporizhzhia Oblast to territory still under control of the Ukrainian government. Ukrainians on Russian-occupied territories were arrested, detained, tortured, their documents confiscated, under the accusation of sabotage, that they were pro-Ukrainian or refused to take a Russian passport. They were made to walk between 10–15 kilometers from the occupied territory through a dangerous area with landmines and trenches, while hearing sounds of shots and shelling. Some were deported as far as Georgia, and banned to return to Russia and Russian-occupied territory for 20 to 40 years. The UN report thus found Russia guilty of deportation, forced displacement, torture and inhuman treatment.

== Territorial control ==
| Name | Pop. | Raion | Held by | As of | More information |
|---|---|---|---|---|---|
| Berdiansk | 107,928 | Berdiansk | Russia | 24 May 2022 | See Berdiansk port attack Captured by Russia 27 February 2022. |
| Chernihivka | 5,645 | Berdiansk | Russia | 17 Mar 2022 | Captured by Russia 14 March 2022. |
| Dniprorudne | 18,036 | Vasylivka | Russia | 22 Apr 2022 | Captured by Russia 4 March 2022. |
| Dorozhnianka | 327 | Polohy | Russia | 28 Dec 2023 | Recaptured by Russia between 31 December 2022 – 2 January 2023. |
| Enerhodar | 52,887 | Vasylivka | Russia | 4 Mar 2022 | See Battle of Enerhodar; Captured by Russia 4 March 2022. |
| Fedorivka | 2,214 | Polohy | Russia | 27 Jul 2023 | |
| Huliaipole | 13,070 | Polohy | Russia | 6 Feb 2026 | See Shelling of Huliaipole and Huliaipole offensive Contested by Russia since November 2025. Captured by Russia in early February 2026. |
| Inzhenerne | 1,003 | Polohy | Russia | 21 May 2022 | |
| Kamianka | 6,507 | Polohy | Russia | 15 Mar 2022 | Captured by Russia 14 March 2022. |
| Kamianka-Dniprovska | 12,332 | Vasylivka | Russia | 2 Mar 2022 | Captured by Russia 2 March 2022. |
| Kamianske | 2,639 | Vasylivka | Russia | 7 Oct 2024 | Shared control between around May 2022 – 5 October 2024. Contested by Russia since 6 October 2024. Claimed captured by Russia which is confirmed by independent Ukrainian sources since 31 July 2025. |
| Kopani | 616 | Polohy | Russia | 11 Oct 2022 | |
| Levadne | 1 | Polohy | Russia | 26 Oct 2024 | Captured by Russia before the 2023 Ukrainian counteroffensive. Recaptured by Ukraine between 12 and 14 June 2023. Claimed recaptured by Russian sources on 12–13 October 2024. Confirmed recaptured by Russia on 26 October 2024. |
| Lobkove | 99 | Vasylivka | Russia | 2 Apr 2025 | Claimed captured by Russia 20 January 2023. Recaptured by Ukraine around 9–11+ June 2023. Contested by Russia since 25 March 2025. Recaptured by Russia around 2 April 2025. |
| Mala Tokmachka | 200 | Polohy | Contested | 24 Nov 2025 | See also: Battle of Mala Tokmachka Contested by Russia since 24 November 2025. |
| Malynivka | 873 | Polohy | Russia | 14 Jul 2025 | Contested by Russia since 20 June 2025. Captured by Russia around 14 July 2025. |
| Melitopol | 150,768 | Melitopol | Russia | 16 May 2022 | See Capture of Melitopol; Captured by Russia 25 February 2022. |
| Mykhailivka | 11,694 | Vasylivka | Russia | 13 May 2022 | |
| Myrne | 872 | Polohy | Russia | 24 Apr 2022 | |
| Nesterianka | 1,566 | Polohy | Russia | 3 Sep 2022 | |
| Novodarivka | 48 | Polohy | Russia | 24 Nov 2024 | Captured by Russia before the 2023 Ukrainian counteroffensive. Recaptured by Ukraine around 11–14+ June 2023. Contested by Russia since 23 November 2024. Claimed re-captured by Russia on 3 December 2024. Confirmed recaptured by Russia on 19 May 2025. |
| Novomykolaivka | 5,059 | Zaporizhzhia | Ukraine | 24 Feb 2022 | |
| Novoprokopivka | 747 | Polohy | Russia | 24 Aug 2023 | |
| Novopokrovka | 314 | Polohy | Russia | 17 Aug 2023 | |
| Orikhiv | 14,136 | Polohy | Ukraine | 30 Mar 2022 | |
| Piatykhatky | 301 | Vasylivka | Russia | 17 Mar 2025 | Captured by Russia before the 2023 Ukrainian counteroffensive. Recaptured by Ukraine around 21–25+ June 2023. Contested by Russia since 16 March 2025. Recaptured by Russia by 25 March 2025 |
| Polohy | 18,396 | Polohy | Russia | 30 Mar 2022 | Captured by Russia 7 March 2022. |
| Plavni | 329 | Vasylivka | Contested | 26 May 2026 | Contested by Russia between around 6 October – December 2024. Recontested by Russia since 11 July 2025. Captured by Russia on 28 August 2025. Recontested by Ukraine on 26 May 2026. |
| Prymorsk | 11,397 | Berdiansk | Russia | 1 Mar 2022 | Captured by Russia 28 February 2022. |
| Robotyne | 480 | Polohy | Russia | 23 May 2024 | Captured by Russia in March 2022. Recaptured by Ukraine between 28 August – 1 September 2023. Contested by Russia between around 19 February – 20 May 2024. Recaptured by Russia around 20 May 2024. |
| Rozivka | 3,022 | Polohy | Russia | 30 Apr 2022 | |
| Stepnohirsk | 4,294 | Vasylivka | Contested | 15 Oct 2022 | Held by Ukraine on 15 October 2022. Contested by Russia since October 2025. |
| Tokmak | 30,132 | Polohy | Russia | 22 Apr 2022 | Captured by Russia 7 March 2022. |
| Vasylivka | 12,771 | Vasylivka | Russia | 23 May 2022 | Captured by Russia by 2 March 2022. |
| Verbove | 1,246 | Polohy | Russia | 1 Aug 2023 | Captured by Russia in 2022. |
| Zahirne | 14 | Polohy | Russia | 16 Jun 2024 | Claimed uncontrolled by a Russian source between around 2023 – 16 June 2024. Claimed by some Russian sources around 16 June 2024. |
| Zaporizhzhia | 722,713 | Zaporizhzhia | Ukraine | 24 Feb 2022 | See Civilian convoy attack, Residential building airstrike, October missile strikes |

== See also ==
- Russian invasion of Ukraine
- Russo-Ukrainian War
- Outline of the Russo-Ukrainian war
- Russian-occupied territories of Ukraine (former occupation marked in italics)
  - Russian occupation of Crimea
  - Russian occupation of Chernihiv Oblast
  - Russian occupation of Donetsk Oblast
  - Russian occupation of Dnipropetrovsk Oblast
  - Russian occupation of Kharkiv Oblast
  - Russian occupation of Kherson Oblast
  - Russian occupation of Kyiv Oblast
  - Russian occupation of Luhansk Oblast
  - Russian occupation of Mykolaiv Oblast
  - Russian occupation of Sumy Oblast
  - Russian occupation of Zhytomyr Oblast
  - Snake Island campaign
- Russian annexation of Crimea
- Collaboration with Russia during the Russian invasion of Ukraine
- Russian annexation of Donetsk, Kherson, Luhansk and Zaporizhzhia oblasts
