= We Are Together with Russia =

Social movement in Zaporizhzhia Oblast, Ukraine

We Are Together with Russia Мы вместе с Россией (Russian) Ми разом з Росією (Ukrainian)
- Leader: Vladimir Rogov
- Founded: 26 July 2022
- Headquarters: Melitopol, Russian-occupied Zaporizhzhia Oblast
- Ideology: Russophilia
- Regional affiliation: United Russia; All-Russia People's Front
- Colours: White, Blue, Red (Russian national colours)

Website
- Telegram channel

We Are Together with Russia (Russian: Мы вместе с Россией, romanized: My vmeste s Rossiyey, Ukrainian: Ми разом з Росією, romanized: My razom z Rosiieiu) is a pro-Russian collaborationist organization operating in the Russian-occupied Zaporizhzhia Oblast and supported by the Russian authorities. It describes itself as an "integration movement". The movement actively advocates the accession of the region to the Russian Federation, and according to the Ukrainian media it is actively involved in the preparation of "referendums" on the occupied Ukrainian territories becoming part of Russia. Its activities are being organized by the United Russia party and the All-Russia People's Front, headed by Vladimir Putin.

"We are together with Russia" is actively cooperating with the authorities of the Russian regions, who have taken "patronage" over the Zaporizhzhia Oblast. According to its own statement, the movement "delivers the necessary humanitarian aid, medicines to the Zaporizhzhia Oblast and sends experienced workers to restore normal life."

== History ==
In early July 2022, Vladimir Rogov, a member of the collaborationist military-civilian administration for the Russian occupied areas of Zaporizhzhia Oblast, announced that the organization had been established. Rogov stated that it would create public councils, "in which all those who are not indifferent are encouraged to participate."

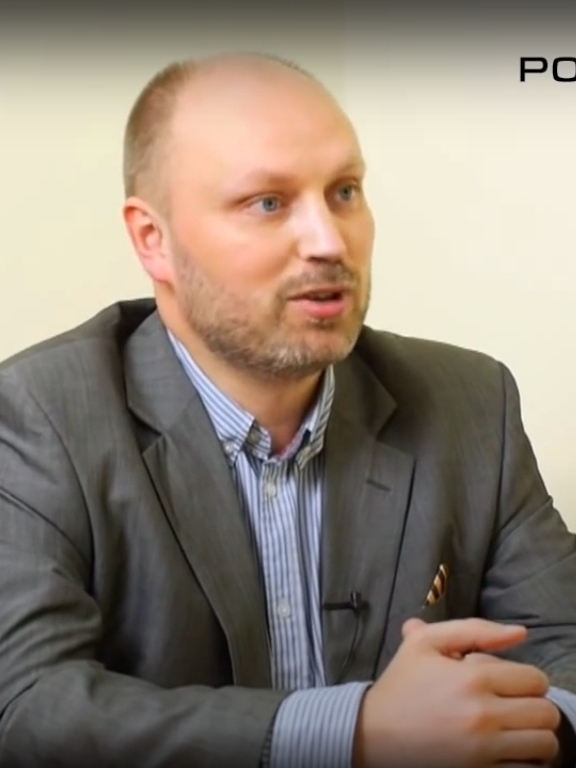
Vladimir Rogov, the leader of the organization

The first public headquarters of the movement were opened at the end of July 2022.

On 17 July, Rogov posted on his Telegram channel a photo of a new road sign at the entrance to the Zaporizhzhia region, with the name of the region written exclusively in Russian, accompanied by the logo of We Are Together with Russia.

On 30 July, the pro-Russian collaborators held a "We Are Together with Russia" forum in occupied Kherson Oblast at the Kherson State University, which ended with creation of the Public Chamber of the Kherson Oblast and the declaration "Russian Kherson" being adopted. The Zaporizhzhia organisation participated in the forum.

On 30 August, according to the movement, a partisan attack took place near the headquarters of the movement in Berdiansk.

On 5 September, according to the movement, two Ukrainian drones attacked the headquarters of the organization in Enerhodar.

On 7 September, the chairman of the movement, Vladimir Rogov, said that "Zaporizhzhia Oblast will focus on holding a vote on joining Russia on November 4." Earlier, such a date for the referendum was announced by Secretary General of United Russia Andrey Turchak.

In the evening of the same day, the headquarters of the movement in Melitopol was blown up, which was confirmed by the Ukrainian mayor of Melitopol Ivan Fedorov.

On 20 September 2022, the movement turned to the head of the occupation administration of the Zaporizhzhia Oblast, Yevgeny Balitsky, with a request to hold a “referendum on joining Russia.” According to Volodymyr Rogov, chairman of the movement, "the congress delegates noted that this would forever restore peace in the Zaporizhzhia region and give impetus to the development of the region, as well as stop the aggression of the Ukrainian regime against civilians."

In September 2022 Vladimir Rogov was personally sanctioned by the United Kingdom.

== See also ==
- Collaboration with Russia during the Russian invasion of Ukraine
- Donetsk Republic (movement)
