= Pavel Sudoplatov Battalion =

- Russian: Батальон имени Павла Судоплатова
- Coat of arms of the Russian-occupied Zaporizhzhia Oblast
- Active: September 2022 – Present
- Country: Russia
- Allegiance: Russia
- Type: Militia
- Size: 600+ (claimed, January 2023)
- Part of: BARS-32
- Patron: Pavel Sudoplatov
- Engagements: Russian invasion of Ukraine: 2023 Ukrainian counteroffensive

Commanders
- Current commander: Dmytro Pogrebnyak
- Notable commanders: Yevgeny Balitsky

The Pavel Sudoplatov Battalion (Russian: Батальон имени Павла Судоплатова, romanized: Batal'on imeni Pavla Sudoplatova), sometimes known as BARS-32, is a Russian volunteer battalion in Russian-occupied Zaporizhzhia Oblast.

As of 2023, Dmytro Pogrebnyak is the unit commander.

== History ==
The battalion was established in September 2022 and consists of pro-Russian Ukrainians and foreign volunteers. It is allied with the Russian-installed authorities in occupied Zaporizhzhia Oblast and led by Yevgeny Balitsky, whose son is also a member of the battalion.

It is named after Soviet intelligence officer and Melitopol native Pavel Sudoplatov, known for conducting the assassination of Ukrainian Nationalist leader Yevhen Konovalets as well as having involvement in the assassination of revolutionary and dissident Leon Trotsky.

The PSB was formally registered as the State Unitary Enterprise "Volunteer Battalion named after P.A. Sudoplatov" by the Federal Taxation Service. Volunteers are paid 400,000 rubles or 5,000 US dollars.

On 4 July 2023, the battalion was subordinated into the BARS-32 ceasing its existence as an independent unit.

On 24 January 2024 at 3:00 AM, Ukrainian sources claimed that 24 members of the battalion were killed and 4 were wounded after a Ukrainian drone strike near the village of Pokrovka. On 14 August 2024, the unit was investigated by the Investigative Committee of Russia for embezzling resources in the occupied Zaporizhzhia region.

On 24 January 2025, the ISW assessed that the battalion, operating as part of BARS-32, is operating in Zaporizhzhia Oblast.

=== Foreign fighters ===
Foreigners who have been recruited to the PSB include nationals from Serbia, Sweden, and Turkey.

== Organization ==
Since 2023, the battalion is attached to the 58th Guards Combined Arms Army of the Russian Armed Forces.

== Structure ==
- "Judgment Day" UAV team
