= Galina Danilchenko =

Russian politician (born 1964)

- Галина Данильченко

Mayor of Russian occupied Melitopol (Note: According to the Security Service of Ukraine, political power in Melitopol is de facto controlled by Yevgeny Balitsky, with Danylchenko serving as a puppet.) (Russian-installed)
- Incumbent (contested)
- Assumed office 12 March 2022 disputed
- Preceded by: Ivan Fedorov (Note: The government of Melitopol is disputed due to the 2022 Russian invasion of Ukraine. Danilchenko was installed by Russian authorities following Fedorov's detention by Russian military forces on 11 March 2022, while the government of Ukraine continues to recognise Fedorov as mayor.)

Personal details
- Born: 5 July 1964 (age 62) Orlovo, Zaporizhzhia Oblast, Ukrainian SSR, Soviet Union (now Ukraine)
- Party: United Russia (2022–present)
- Other political affiliations: Party of Regions (until 2015); Opposition Bloc (2015–2022)
- Education: Melitopol Institute of Agricultural Mechanization; Moscow Timiryazev Agricultural Academy

Galina Viktorovna Danilchenko (Note: Russian: Галина Викторовна Данильченко Ukrainian: Галина Вікторівна Данильченко, romanized: Halyna Viktorivna Danylchenko) (born 5 July 1964) is a Russian and Ukrainian accountant and politician who was installed by Russia as the acting mayor of Melitopol during the 2022 Russian invasion of Ukraine, following the kidnapping of Ivan Fedorov by the Russian military. She was a former member of the Melitopol City Council, elected in 2015, and became its secretary soon thereafter.

== Biography ==
Danilchenko was born 5 July 1964 in Orlovo, a village in the Melitopol district. She studied at the Melitopol Institute of Agricultural Mechanization She graduated from the Russian State Agrarian University – Moscow Timiryazev Agricultural Academy. She worked in a kindergarten for a few weeks and worked in a laboratory at a hydraulic tractor plant.

After completing a specialization in economics and auditing, she worked as an accountant at a motor plant. In 2000, she began working as an accountant for Melitopol Plain Bearing Plant until 2015. She is now the director of the factory. The company is owned by Yevhen Balytskyi.

Balitsky suggested that Danilchenko enter politics. Until 2015, she was a member of the Party of Regions. In 2015, she was elected to the Melitopol City Council as a member of the Opposition Bloc and was appointed its secretary by Balytskyi soon thereafter. In 2021, Danylchenko was nominated to the position of director of the Zaporizhzhia Regional Contact Centre.

=== 2022 Russian invasion of Ukraine ===
Danilchenko, former member of the City Council, was installed by the Russian occupation forces as acting mayor on 12 March 2022, the day after mayor Ivan Fedorov's abduction by the Russian military. At the same time she announced that the City Council was being abolished and replaced by a "committee of people's deputies". She urged city residents to accept "the new reality in order to start living in a new way as soon as possible." Danylchenko thanked the head of Chechnya, Ramzan Kadyrov, for humanitarian aid.

On 13 March 2022 Iryna Venediktova, Prosecutor General of Ukraine, opened an investigation against Danilchenko for the crime of treason for attempting to set up an occupying government in Melitopol; the investigation was opened at the request of the Melitopol City Council. On the same day, Danylchenko announced that Russian TV channels would be broadcast in Melitopol, claiming that "a great deficit of trustworthy information being circulated" existed.

According to the Security Service of Ukraine (SBU) and BBC, Danylchenko does not wield power as mayor of Melitopol, and is instead a front for Yevgeny Balitsky, who she worked under prior to entering politics.

=== Sanctions ===
She was sanctioned by the UK government in 2022 in relation to the Russo-Ukrainian War.

== Personal life ==
Danilchenko lives in Spaske/Spasskoye in the Melitopol Raion. She voted for Viktor Yushchenko but was not satisfied by his presidency. In 2017, she called Petro Poroshenko the worst president, and stated that she regretted voting for him.

== See also ==
- Collaboration with Russia during the Russian invasion of Ukraine
