= Capture of Melitopol =

Battle in the Russian invasion of Ukraine

- Part of the southern front of the Russian invasion of Ukraine
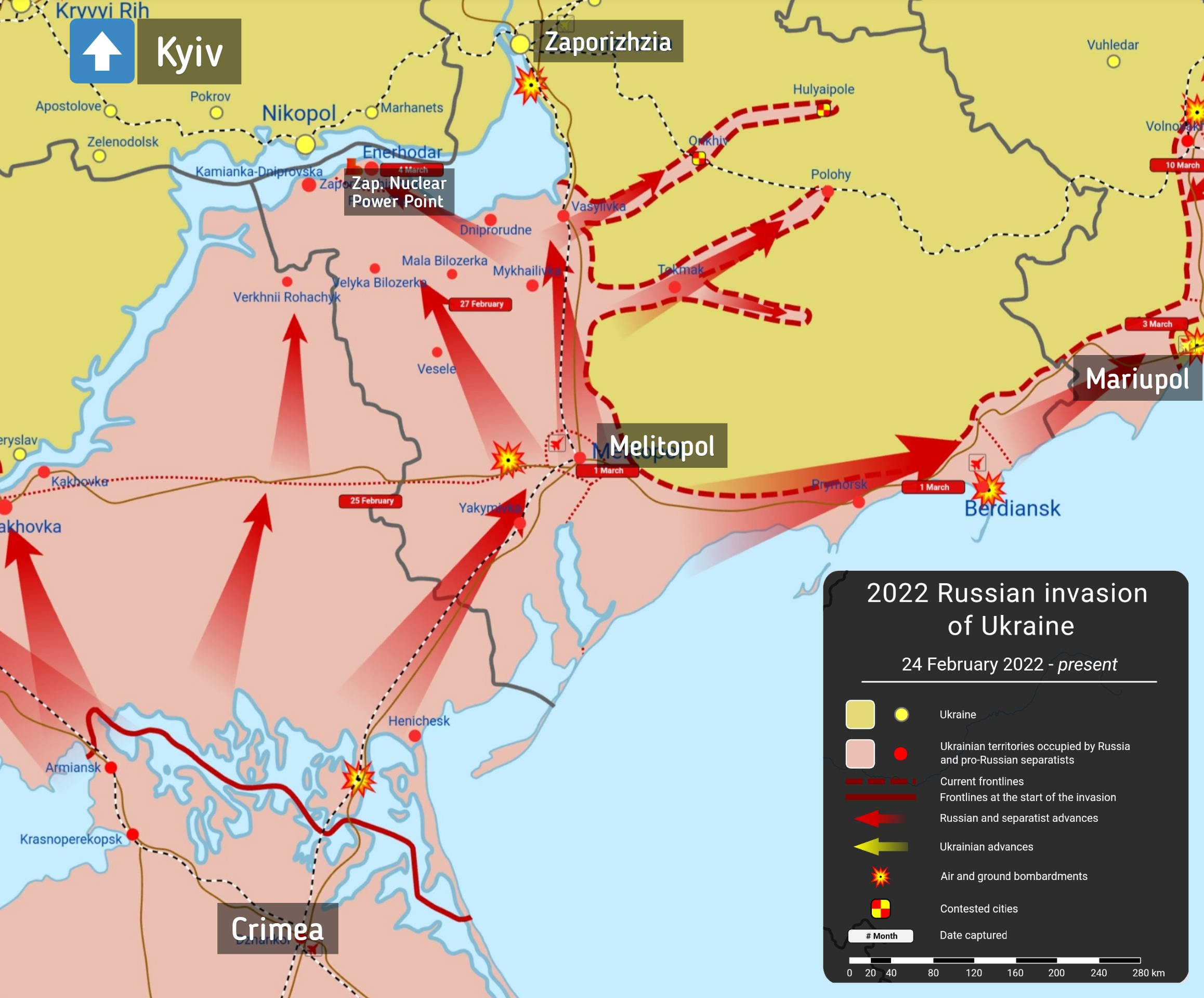
- Map of the Russian advance on Melitopol in late February-early March 2022
Date	25 – 26 February 2022 (1 day)
Location	Melitopol, Zaporizhzhia Oblast, Ukraine
Status	Russian victory

Belligerents
Russia	Ukraine

Casualties and losses
- 4+ civilians killed 12+ injured

A military engagement took place between the Armed Forces of Ukraine and the Armed Forces of Russia in the city of Melitopol, Zaporizhzhia Oblast, on the southern front of the Russian invasion of Ukraine. Russian forces entered the city on 25 February and took control of its government buildings.

== Background ==
Melitopol is the second largest city in Zaporizhzhia Oblast after its capital, Zaporizhzhia. It is situated on the Molochna River that flows through the eastern edge of the city and into the Molochnyi Lyman, which eventually joins the Sea of Azov. Its population before the invasion was estimated as 148,851.

The city is located at the crossing of two major European highways, and there is also an electrified railway line of international importance that goes through the city. It was called "the gateway to the Crimea;" prior to the 2014 Russian occupation of Crimea 80% of passenger trains heading to the peninsula passed through the city and during summer road traffic would reach 45,000 vehicles per day. Melitopol's mayor Ivan Fedorov said that if Russian troops had come to the city in 2014, they would have been "welcomed with bread and salt", a traditional greeting in Russia and Ukraine.

Control of the city would allow Russian troops to advance towards Berdiansk and then to Mariupol, which would establish a land connection linking Crimea and the Donetsk People's Republic.

Melitopol Air Base was bombarded early in the morning on 24 February 2022, as part of the initial Russian strikes on Ukrainian military bases in the early hours of the invasion. Cruise missiles hit the control tower, a fueling station, and an Il-76 preparing for takeoff, killing an aviation technician.

About 100 men volunteered for the Territorial Defense Forces in Melitopol in the early hours of 24 February, but were dismissed as there were no weapons to be distributed. In the afternoon, the 25th Transport Aviation Brigade, which was headquartered at Melitopol's air base, was ordered to withdraw from the city; as a logistics unit, it lacked heavy weaponry. Russian tanks reached the entrance of the city by 16:00.

The 115th Battalion of the 110th Territorial Defense Brigade, made up of Melitopol residents, seized some weapons from the airbase and engaged the Russian column at the village of Nove, Zaporizhia Oblast, southeast of the city, at 16:00, disabling an armored personnel carrier. The Russians moved to the village of Mordvynivka, and the Ukrainian territorial defense fighters were ordered to withdraw from the city at midnight.

== Battle ==
Explosions were heard throughout Melitopol between 6:00 and 7:00 in the morning of 25 February. By 7:10, reports began to emerge of a Russian column entering the city from the north, with Russian military vehicles seen on Lomonosova Street and Heroiv Ukrainy Street.

By 10:00, Ukrainian officials announced that street fighting for administrative buildings and military facilities in Melitopol was underway. Videos emerged of Russian soldiers taking up positions at Melitopol's city hall and the Security Service of Ukraine building in the city center. The city's airfield and police building also came under fire. A Ukrainian T-64BV tank was reportedly disabled on Lomonosova Street.

Shells hit apartment buildings and destroyed civilian homes, injuring two civilians, and an oncology centre was fired upon, killing four people and injuring 10 others. Shooting and explosions continued to be heard in various neighborhoods into the afternoon. The Russian military claimed that it had taken the city, though James Heappey, the British Armed Forces Minister, said that the Russian claim could not be substantiated. Some residents claimed that the northern part of the city remained under the control of the Ukrainian military.

The following day, Oleksandr Starukh, governor of Zaporizhzhia Oblast, said that the situation in Melitopol was difficult, as fighting continued. A clash between Russian forces and Ukrainian Territorial Defense troops was reported. Russian flags were raised over captured administrative buildings, but the city government was said to be continuing its operations in different buildings.

== Aftermath ==
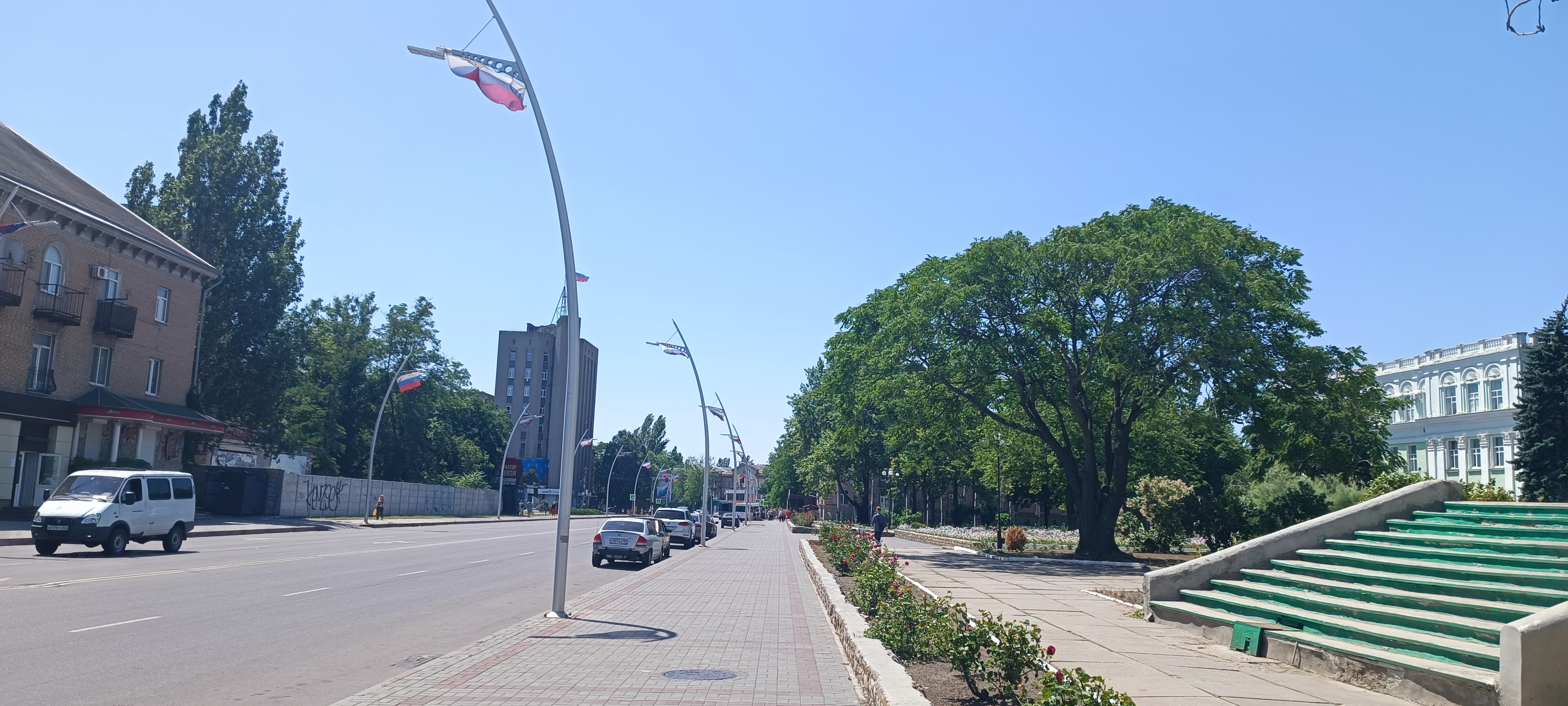
Russian flags in the main avenue of Melitopol, 2023

On 27 February, residents reported hearing artillery shelling and gunfire in some areas of the city. Squads of up to 150 people were reportedly established to patrol the streets at night to "combat" mass looting. Shooting continued to be heard in Melitopol at 5:00 a.m. on 28 February. The State Emergency Service of Ukraine in Zaporizhzhia Oblast stated that Russian airstrikes and shelling had damaged buildings of an emergency rescue unit, destroying some rescue equipment. Local volunteer forces took up the defense of the city hall building during the day, with Fedorov saying that Russian troops had destroyed much of the building when it was initially captured. Reports of mass looting of retail stores continued.

On the morning of 1 March, the Zaporizhzhia Oblast administration announced that the Russian military's Southern Group of Forces was preparing to launch offensives from Melitopol towards the city of Zaporizhzhia, and from Berdiansk towards Mariupol. Volunteers continued patrolling the city to maintain order and prevent looting, as the city experienced problems with utilities and shortages of food, medicine, and fuel. After the fall of the city, Melitopol came under a Russian military occupation. Multiple protests occurred during the Russian occupation of the city.

On 13 March, the Melitopol City Council declared that, "The occupying troops of the Russian Federation are trying to illegally create an occupation administration of the city of Melitopol." It appealed to the Prosecutor General of Ukraine, Iryna Venediktova, to launch a pre-trial investigation into Galina Danilchenko and her party Opposition Bloc for treason. Ukrayinska Pravda reported that the Russian military had abducted Melitopol's District Council chairman Serhiy Priyma and had tried to abduct City Council Secretary Roman Romanov. Meanwhile, Russian military vehicles were seen announcing via loudspeakers that rallies and demonstrations had been prohibited and that a curfew was imposed from 6:00 pm to 6:00 am.

Residents held street protests against the military occupation. On 11 March, the Fedorov was arrested by Russian troops for refusing to cooperate, but was later released on 16 March in exchange for nine Russian prisoners of war.

== See also ==
- Battle of Enerhodar
