= Liubymivka, Beryslav Raion, Kherson Oblast =

Village in Kherson Oblast, Ukraine

Liubymivka Любимівка
- Village
- Interactive map of Liubymivka
- Location of Liubymivka in Kherson Oblast Liubymivka (Ukraine)
- Coordinates: 47.392778°N 33.716667°E
- Country: Ukraine
- Oblast: Kherson Oblast
- Raion: Beryslav Raion
- Founded: 1921

Area
  - Total: 199 km^{2} (77 sq mi)
- Elevation: 79 m (259 ft)

Population (2001 census)
  - Total: 1,695
  - Density: 8.52/km^{2} (22.1/sq mi)
- Time zone: UTC+2 (EET)
  - Summer (DST): UTC+3 (EEST)
- Postal code: 74212
- Area code: +380 5533

Liubymivka (Ukrainian: Любимівка; Russian: Любимовка) is a village in Beryslav Raion (district) in Kherson Oblast of southern Ukraine, at about 118.9 kilometres (73.9 mi) northeast of the centre of Kherson city. It belongs to Novovorontsovka rural hromada, one of the hromadas of Ukraine.

== History ==
The village was founded in 1921 by peasants from the nearby villages of Osokorivka and Novovorontsovka. The peasants had moved there after the Decree on Land under Vladimir Lenin, as they received land plots from the holdings of the Vorontsov (a Russian noble family) estate. However, up until 1923, the village had no official name, when it was given the name of Liubymivka. In 1930 the state collective farm "Pioner" was established, which was under the state TOEK trust (Trust of Oil and Essential Oil Crops). During the Great Patriotic War, the village was occupied by German forces from 21 August 1941 to 27 February 1944. In 1974, the Liubymivka Village Council was established.

The village came under attack by Russian forces in 2022, during the Russian invasion of Ukraine and was regained by Ukrainian forces by the beginning of October the same year.

== Demographics ==
The settlement had 1965 inhabitants in 2001, native language distribution as of the Ukrainian Census of the same year:

- Ukrainian: 96.46%
- Russian: 2.54%
- Armenian: 0.47%
- Moldovan (Romanian): 0.29%
- Belarusian: 0.12%

== Monuments ==
In 2023, the residents of the village erected a memorial to the soldiers who died near the village on 1 October 2022. The soldiers were part of the 128th Mountain Assault Brigade, and died after a shell hit them. The surviving members of the attack, after the city's liberation in October 2022, asked the residents for help in erecting a cross at the site of the attack.
