= Volodymyr Leontiev =

Russian separatist from Kharkiv (1964–2025)

"Chairman of the Council of Deputies of the Novokakhovsk Urban Okrug"
- In office 19 October 2023 – 1 October 2025
- Preceded by: Office created

Russian installed mayor of Nova Kakhovka Disputed with Valerii Brusenskyi (Note: Head of the Ukrainian Nova Kakhovka military-civilian administration)
- In office 19 March 2022 – 19 October 2023
- Preceded by: Volodymyr Kovalenko; Elected Ukrainian Mayor
- Succeeded by: Vitaly Gura

Personal details
- Born: 1964
- Died: 1 October 2025 (aged 60–61) Nova Kakhovka, Russian-occupied Kherson Oblast
- Political party: United Russia

Volodymyr Leontiev (Ukrainian: Володимир Леонтьєв, Russian: Владимир Леонтьев, romanized: Vladimir Leontyev; 1964 – 1 October 2025) was a Russian collaborator during the Russo-Ukrainian war, installed by the Russian Armed Forces as the head of their occupation authority in Nova Kakhovka, a city in Kherson Oblast. Known for his support of Russia's policy of abducting Ukrainian children, Leontiev was killed in a drone strike on 1 October 2025.

== Life and career ==
Leontiev began collaborating with Russian forces shortly after their occupation of Nova Kakhovka in March of 2022, joining the Russian installed city council. Leontiev made a name for himself by compiling lists of "patriotic" Ukrainians, and those opposed to Russification, as well as abducting and deporting their children. His loyalty to Russia saw him installed as the head of the occupation authorities of both Nova Kakhovka and the wider Kakhovka Raion. Leontiev became the person recognized as the mayor by the Russian occupation authorities on 19 March 2022. He would be replaced on 19 October 2023 by Vitaly Gura, who helped secure the city's surrender and became the chairman of the Russian installed city council. Gura helped shape the council into an older Soviet-styled council that holds the real authority in the city, with the mayor being reduced to a mostly figurehead role.

He was involved in the abduction and torture of the elected pre-war mayor of Beryslav, Oleksandr Shapovalo, for which he was sentenced to 15 years in prison in absentia by a court in Kyiv, shortly after he also had the charges of collaboration brought against him. In April 2022 he was involved in the kidnapping and torture of journalist Oleh Baturin. In 2024 he received another 12 year sentence, this time for his role in the kidnapping of Baturin, as well as the pre-war mayor of Tavriisk, and a pre-war member of the Nova Kakhovka city council. On 1 October 2025, Leontiev was caught in a Ukrainian drone strike by a Baba Yaga drone, although he was rushed to a hospital, the Russian installed governor of Kherson Oblast, Vladimir Saldo, announced that he died of his wounds only an hour after arriving.
