= Yevgeny Balitsky =

Russian and Ukrainian politician (born 1969)

- Евгений Балицкий (Russian); Євген Балицький (Ukrainian)
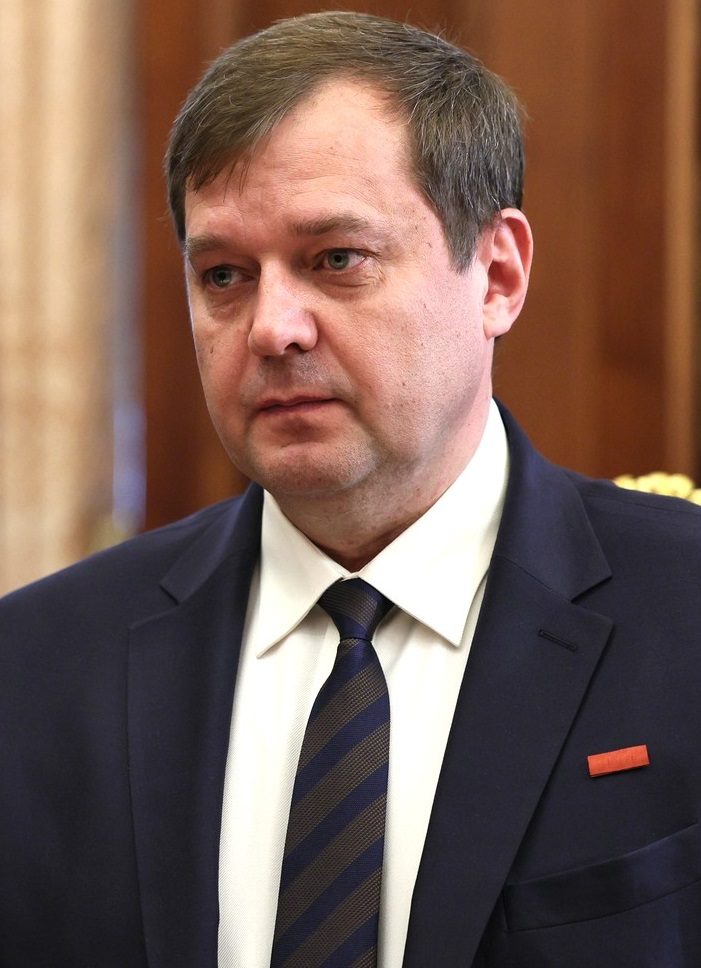
- Balitsky in 2023

Governor of Zaporozhye Oblast
- Disputed (Note: Zaporizhzhia Oblast is internationally recognized as Ukrainian territory, but Russia annexed the region in 2022. Ivan Fedorov is recognized by Ukraine as the Oblast's governor.)
- Assumed office 23 September 2023
- President: Vladimir Putin
- Preceded by: Position established

People's Deputy Verkhovna Rada of Ukraine
- In office 12 December 2012 – 29 August 2019
- Preceded by: Constituency established
- Succeeded by: Serhii Minko
- Constituency: Zaporizhzhia Oblast, N 80

Director of the European Integration department of the Government of Ukraine
- In office 12 February 2010 – 12 December 2012
- President: Viktor Yanukovych
- Prime Minister: Mykola Azarov

Deputy Zaporizhzhia Oblast Council
- In office 10 September 1998 – 23 September 2012
- Constituency: Zaporizhzhia Oblast

Personal details
- Born: 10 December 1969 (age 56) Melitopol, Ukrainian SSR, Soviet Union
- Party: United Russia (since 2022)
- Other political affiliations: Independent (1998–2004, 2014); Party of Regions (2004–2014); Opposition Bloc (2015–2018)
- Children: 3

Military service
- Allegiance: Soviet Union (1991); CIS (1991–1992); Ukraine (1992–1995)
- Branch/service: Soviet Air Forces; Ukrainian Air Force
- Years of service: 1991–1995

Yevgeny Vitalyevich Balitsky (Russian: Евгений Витальевич Балицкий, Ukrainian: Євген Віталійович Балицький, romanized: Yevhen Vitaliiovych Balytskyi; born 10 December 1969) is a Russian and former Ukrainian politician. Since 23 September 2023, he has been the governor of the Russian-occupied Zaporizhzhia Oblast.

Balitsky served in the Soviet and Ukrainian Air Force from 1991 to 1995, before entering business, serving as head of a household appliance company in Melitopol.

He entered politics in 1998 as an independent member of the Zaporizhzhia Oblast Council and joined the Party of Regions in 2004, and had served as a People's Deputy of Ukraine in the 7th and 8th convocations of the Verkhovna Rada from 2012 to 2019.

== Early life and career ==
Yevhen Vitaliiovych Balitsky was born in Melitopol, then in the Ukrainian Soviet Socialist Republic of the Soviet Union, on 10 December 1969, to a family of military aviators. In 1987, he graduated from high school. In 1991, he graduated from Tambov Higher Military Aviation Engineering School as a lieutenant. For the next four years, he served in various aviation garrisons, and in 1995 was transferred to the reserves from Melitopol Regiment military transport aircraft with the rank of captain.

From 1995 to 1997, he was the head of the OlZheKa company, which sold and repaired household appliances in Melitopol. In 1996, OlZheKa established the first FM radio station in Melitopol, called Southern Space.

From 1997 to 2007, Balitsky was head of the Melitopol Brewery, and only in 2007 did he sell a controlling stake in this company. Since 2000, he led Melitopol Avtogidroagregat, a tractor parts company. As of 2012, he was deputy director for economics at Melitopol Avtogidroagregat. Both Melitopol Brewery and Avtogidroagregat achieved economic success under Balitsky's leadership.

== Regional politics ==
From 1998 to 2002, Balitsky was a deputy of the Zaporizhzhia Oblast Council, as an independent.

In March 2002, Balitsky was seen as a plausible candidate for mayor of Melitopol.

In 2004, he joined the Party of Regions, and from 2010 to 2012 he again served as a deputy of the Zaporizhzhia Oblast Council as a member of the party. This time, he served as a member of the Standing Committee on the Budget, as well as the Department Director in the European Integration Ukraine Government.

== National politics ==
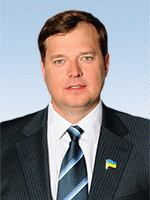
Balitsky's portrait as a member of the Verkhovna Rada

From 2012 to 2019, Balitsky was a People's Deputy of Ukraine, serving in the 7th and 8th convocation of the Verkhovna Rada (Ukraine's national parliament). He was elected both times as member of Zaporizhia Oblast district No. 80, a multi-member district comprising Melitopol and Melitopol Raion, with 54.46% of the votes. In the 2012 Ukrainian parliamentary election he was elected as a member of the Party of Regions and in 2014 reelected as a self-nominated candidate, receiving 47.4% of the vote.

In June 2013, Balitsky was among a group of 148 people's deputies of Ukraine who signed the Appeal of deputies from the Party of Regions and the Communist Party of Ukraine to the Polish Sejm with a request to "recognize the Volyn tragedy as genocide against the Polish population and condemn the criminal acts of Ukrainian nationalists." This step was described as national treason by the first President of Ukraine, Leonid Kravchuk.

On 16 January 2014, he was one of the deputies who voted for the Anti-protest laws in Ukraine.

On 14 February 2014, he was elected deputy chairman of the Melitopol chapter of the Party of Regions. In April, Balitsky noted environmental problems at Molochnyi Lyman.

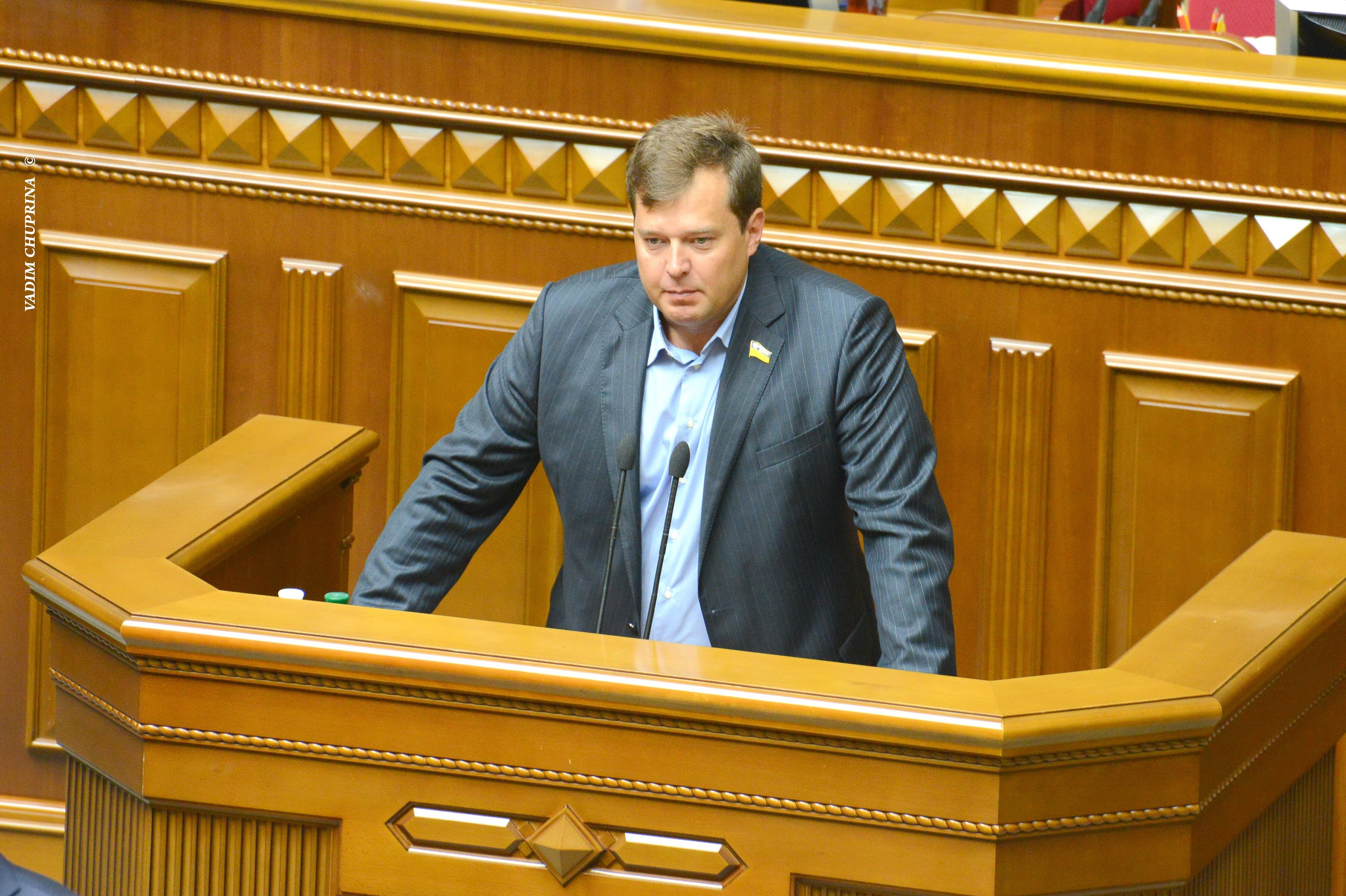
Balitsky in the Verkhovna Rada, 2014

On 3 June 2014, Balitsky left the Party of Regions faction in the Verkhovna Rada, later joining the Opposition Bloc in May 2015.

On 2 July 2014, he announced the registration of the deputy group "For peace and stability". On 17 September 2014, deputies of this group attended a meeting of the State Duma of the Russian Federation. Balitsky was not among them, as he refused the invitation.

On 12 July 2016, despite constant media scrutiny of the voting procedure, Balytskyi, in addition to himself, voted for two other fellow MPs who were absent from their seats, hiding behind his jacket. As response to the coverage, he gave his middle finger to a journalist who was filming him during a vote in the Verkhovna Rada.

On 18 January 2018, he was one of 36 MPs who voted against the Law on the Recognition of Ukrainian Sovereignty over the Occupied Territories of Donetsk and Luhansk Regions.

On 23 April 2019, he was one of the 59 MPs who signed a motion on the basis of which the Constitutional Court of Ukraine cancelled the article of the Criminal Code of Ukraine on illicit enrichment, which required public officials to provide explanations about the sources of their income and the income of their family members. Criminal liability for illicit enrichment was introduced in Ukraine in 2015. This was one of the EU's requirements for the implementation of the Visa Liberalisation Action Plan, as well as one of Ukraine's commitments to the IMF, as set out in the Memorandum.

In the 2019 Ukrainian parliamentary election Balitsky failed to get reelected in district No. 80, this time for the party Opposition Bloc. In this election he gained 29.5% of the votes in the constituency, while winner Serhii Minko won with 33.13%.

In the 2020 Ukrainian local elections Balitsky was again elected as a deputy of the Zaporizhzhia Oblast Council for the party Opposition Bloc.

== Collaboration with Russian forces ==
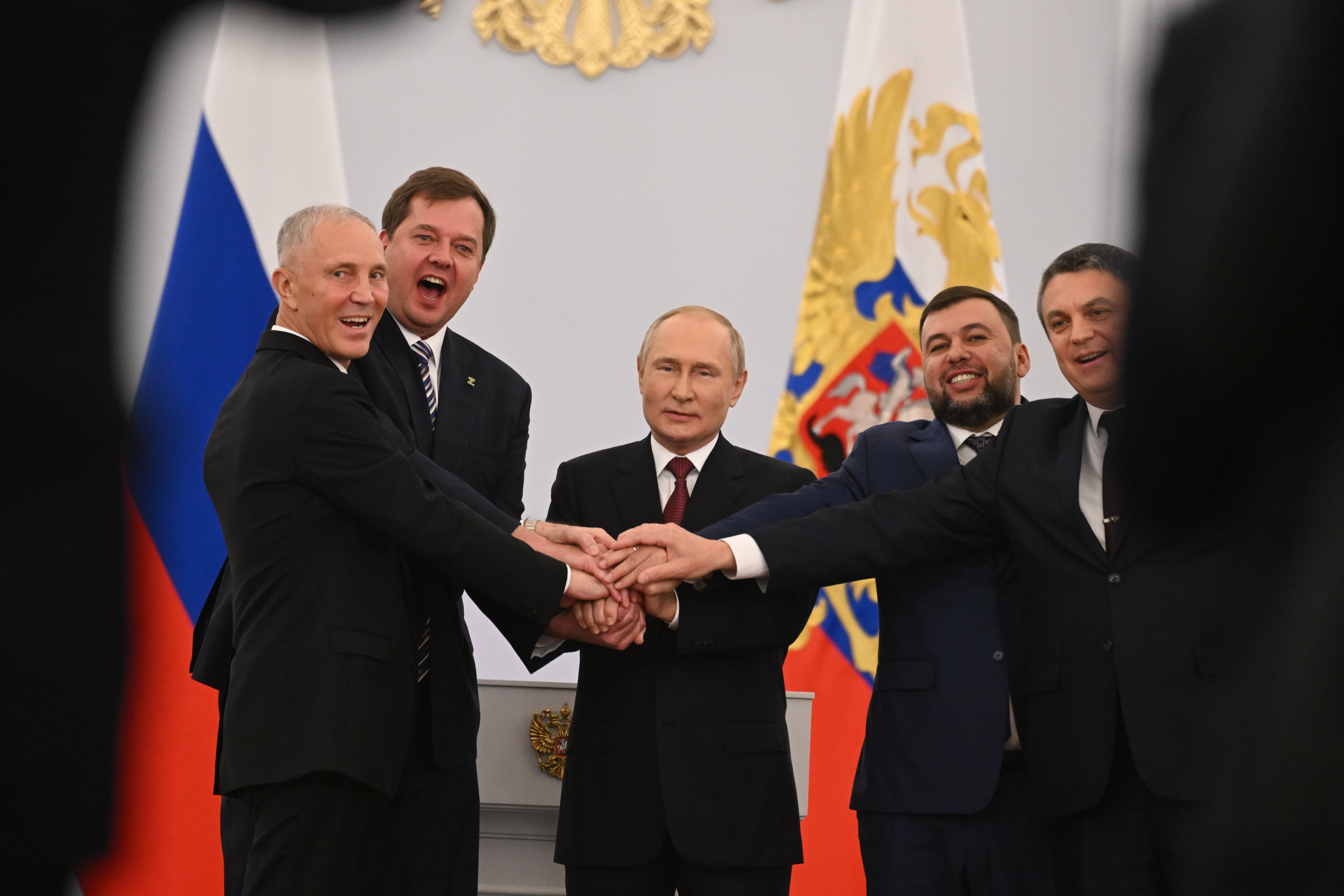
Balitsky (second from left) celebrating with Vladimir Putin and three other Russian-backed leaders of occupied Ukrainian regions

Following the capture of Melitopol by Russian forces during the 2022 Russian invasion of Ukraine, Balitsky assisted in the establishment of a new, pro-Russian government in the city. The Security Service of Ukraine (SBU) has claimed that Balitsky is the grey eminence of the occupation in Melitopol.

On 9 May 2022, it was reported that Balitsky was appointed governor of the Russian-occupied Zaporizhia Oblast. Balitsky became a member of the United Russia political party on 26 September 2022.

On 30 September 2022, Balitsky and the other pro-Russian occupation heads, Denis Pushilin, Leonid Pasechnik and Volodymyr Saldo, attended the ceremony in Moscow during which Vladimir Putin formally announced the annexation of the Donetsk, Kherson, Luhansk and Zaporizhzhia oblasts.

In January 2023, Balitsky and the administration established the Pavel Sudoplatov Battalion and Balitsky's son joined it as a soldier.

== Sanctions ==
On 25 December 2018, he was included in the sanctions list of Russia, (excluded from the list by Decree of the Government of the Russian Federation of 26 November 2022 No. 2151).

On 21 July 2022, he was included in the sanctions list of all EU countries because he "cooperated with Russian authorities in the Ukrainian city of Melitopol, supported the appointment of Galina Danilchenko as mayor of Melitopol after the abduction of the legitimate mayor".

On 15 September 2022, he was included in US sanctions lists, because he "oversees the removal of Ukrainian grain from the Zaporizhzhia region".

He was sanctioned by the UK government in 2022 in relation to the Russo-Ukrainian War.

== Criminal prosecution ==
In 2015, Balitsky became a suspect in a criminal case involving the embezzlement and misappropriation of 37 million hryvnias (approximately $1.5 million at the December 2015 exchange rate) in state funds. According to the investigation, in 2008 the Balitsky family took out a loan from Ukreximbank using assets of one of their enterprises, the Melitopol Plain Bearings Plant, as collateral, and immediately began bankrupting the plant. The court found the plant’s director guilty of intentionally bankrupting the enterprise and fined him 8,500 hryvnias (around $380 in 2015). A case on the misappropriation of bank funds was opened but never went to trial.

In 2017, the Prosecutor General’s Office of Ukraine initiated a criminal case against Balitsky for separatist statements: he had threatened to "leave Ukraine together with his constituency".

In June 2023, Balitsky was convicted in absentia in Ukraine under charges of organizing an illegal referendum and attempting to alter the country’s borders. He was sentenced to 15 years in prison with confiscation of property. A year later, a Ukrainian court ruled to nationalize the confiscated assets, including five light aircraft and an aircraft maintenance company. The total estimated value of the property was 120 million hryvnias.

== Awards ==
- 2013 – Order of Merit, Third degree
- 2022 – Order "For Merit to the Fatherland", Third degree

== See also ==
- Collaboration with Russia during the Russian invasion of Ukraine
