= Dorozhnianka =

Dorozhnianka Дорожня́нка
- Village
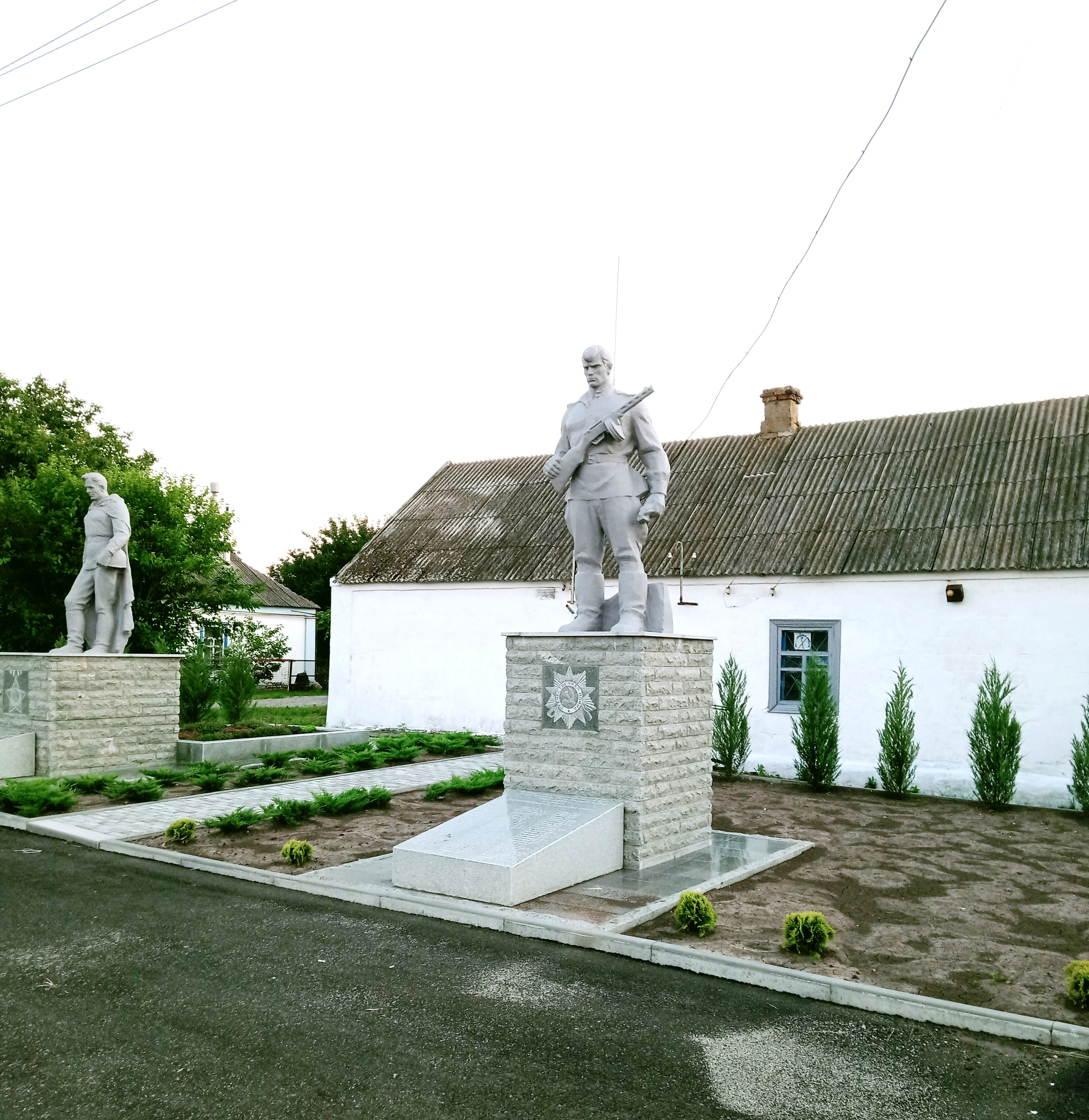
- The village monument to Soviet soldiers in World War II
- Interactive map of Dorozhnianka
- Location of Dorozhnianka within Zaporizhzhia Oblast Dorozhnianka (Ukraine)
- Coordinates: 47°35′31″N 36°16′53″E
- Country: Ukraine
- Oblast: Zaporizhzhia Oblast
- District: Polohy Raion
- Founded: 1922

Area
  - Total: 1,097 km^{2} (424 sq mi)

Population (2001)
  - Total: 327
  - Density: 0.298/km^{2} (0.772/sq mi)

Dorozhnianka (Ukrainian: Дорожня́нка, pronounced [doroʒˈnʲɑnkɐ]) is a village in southern Ukraine. Administratively, it is located in Huliaipole urban hromada, Polohy Raion, Zaporizhzhia Oblast. It has a population of 327.

On the southern outskirts of the village, there is a nature reserve, Balka Dorozhnyanska.

== History ==
During the full-scale Russian invasion of Ukraine, on 15 May 2022, according to Ukraine's Zaporizhzhia regional military administration, Russian forces completely cut off the village's transport routes, blowing up the highways to Polohy and Huliaipole with mines. The depth of the explosion craters reportedly was 1.5 metres (4.9 ft).

On 31 December 2022, the Russian Ministry of Defense announced the capture of Dorozhnianka. The previous day, Russian troops reportedly had broken through Ukrainian defensive lines west of the village. On 17 August 2023, during the 2023 Ukrainian counteroffensive, Russian sources reported that a Ukrainian reconnaissance-in-force near the village was unsuccessful. As of 28 December 2023, Russian forces continue holding the village.

== Demographics ==
According to the 1989 Soviet census, the settlement had 364 people, of whom 164 were men and 200 women.

By the time of the 2001 census in independent Ukraine, that number had shrunk to 327. Their languages were 92.77% Ukrainian, 6.63% Russian, and 0.6% other languages.
