= Mala Tokmachka =

Village in Zaporizhzhia Oblast, Ukraine

Mala Tokmachka Мала Токмачка
- Village
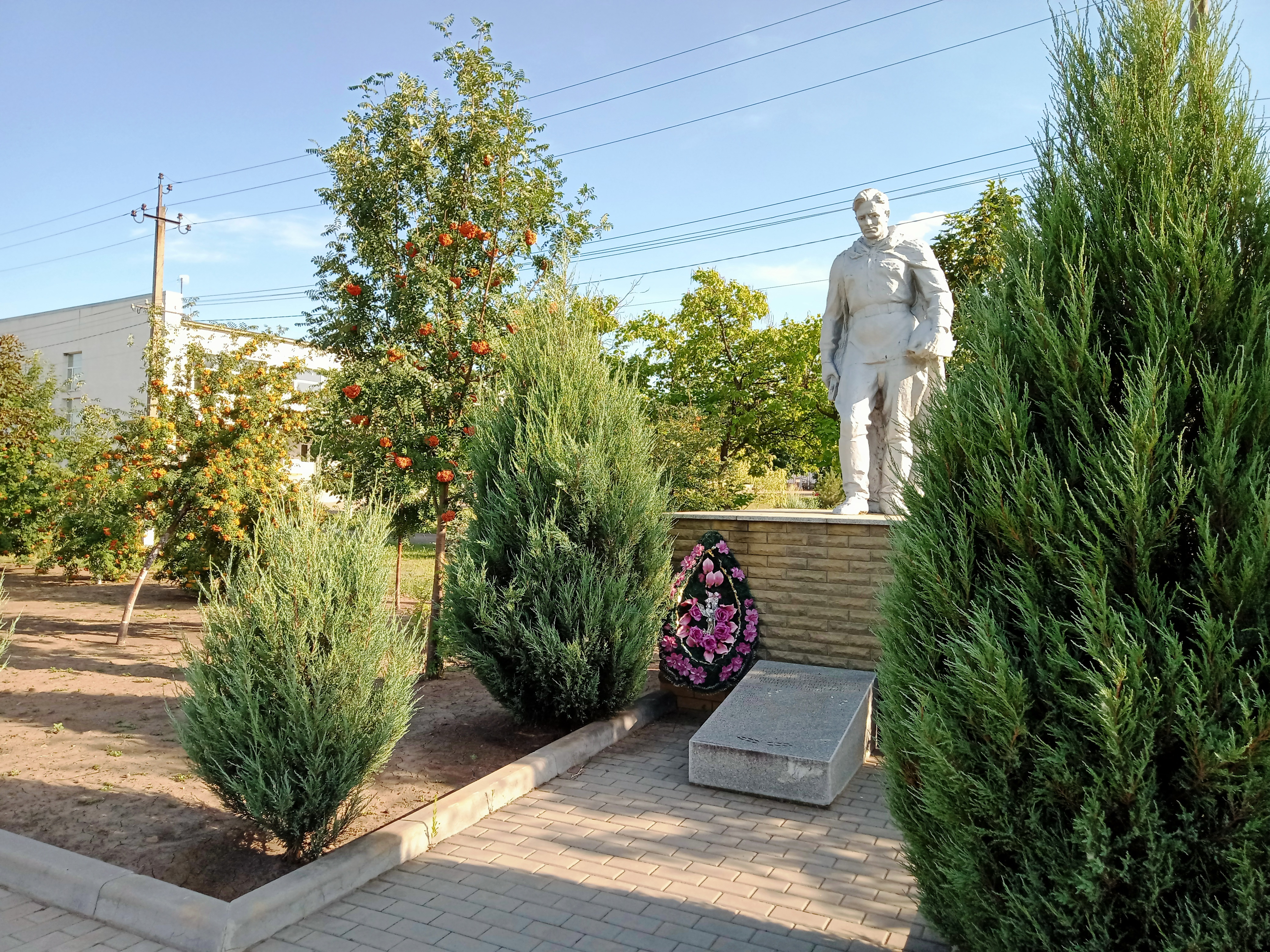
- War memorial in the center of the village of Mala Tokmachka

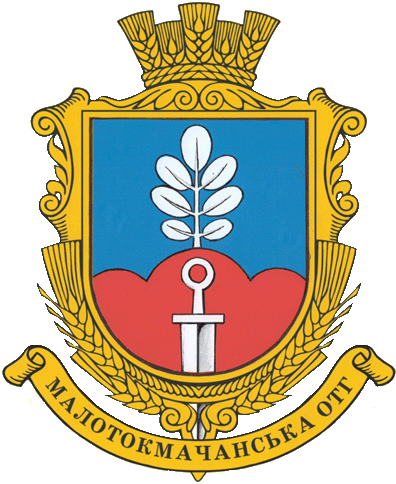
- Flag Coat of arms
- Interactive map of Mala Tokmachka
- Coordinates: 47°31′58″N 35°53′49″E
- Country: Ukraine
- Oblast: Zaporizhzhia Oblast
- Raion: Polohy Raion
- Hromada: Mala Tokmachka rural hromada
- Founded: 1783

Area
  - Total: 8.04 km^{2} (3.10 sq mi)
- Elevation: 68 m (223 ft)

Population (2023)
  - Total: 200
  - Density: 25/km^{2} (64/sq mi)
- Time zone: UTC+2 (EET)
  - Summer (DST): UTC+3 (EEST)
- Postal code: 70550
- Area code: +380 6141
- KOATUU code: 2323982501
- KATOTTH code: UA23100130010093963

Mala Tokmachka (Ukrainian: Мала Токмачка) is a village in Polohy Raion, Zaporizhzhia Oblast, Ukraine, and the administrative center of Mala Tokmachka rural hromada. Since the beginning of the Russian invasion of Ukraine, the village has dropped significantly in population due to its proximity to the active frontline, with the land outside of the village remaining an active battleground during the 2023 Ukrainian counteroffensive.

The village subsequently became the subject of internet memes, as Russian media repeatedly reported the same success over months, while also becoming a symbol of resilience for Ukraine, with the defense reportedly lasting over 1,500 days.

== Geography ==
Mala Tokmachka is located on the Kinska river that flows through Zaporizhzhia Oblast. It is located 12 kilometres (7.5 mi) from Orikhiv.

== History ==
Mala Tokmachka was founded in 1783 under the Russian Empire on the site of a former Nogai settlement by migrants from Chernihiv Governorate, Poltava Governorate, and Kyiv Governorate. In 1802, Mala Tokmachka was assigned to Tavria Governorate, and in 1842, it specifically became part of Berdyansky Uyezd (county) within the governorate. By 1886, Mala Tokmachka had a population of 3,534 people, an Eastern Orthodox church, and a school.

During World War I and the Ukrainian War of Independence, the settlement changed hands between warring factions several times. Afterwards it was administratively part of the Zaporizhzhia Governorate of Ukraine. As a result of the Holodomor, a manmade famine across the Ukrainian Soviet Socialist Republic from 1932 to 1933, a documented 281 people in Mala Tokmachka died. During World War II, Mala Tokmachka was occupied by Nazi Germany between October 1941 and September 1943. There was a memorial installed in honor of the Red Army soldiers who died liberating the village and to the people from the village who died elsewhere on the frontline.

In late 2016, Mala Tokmachka became center of Mala Tokmachka rural hromada, one of the hromadas of Ukraine established in administrative reforms in the 2010s.

=== Russian invasion of Ukraine ===
At the beginning of the full-scale Russian invasion of Ukraine in 2022, Mala Tokmachka became a frontline settlement during Russia's initial advance into the nation. The population would drop to only around 200 people by May 2023 due to the proximity of the fighting to the village and consistent Russian shelling which destroyed much of the local infrastructure and utilities. The settlement would remain as part of the minor Mala Tokmachka–Novofedorivka, Mala Tokmachka–Ocheretuvate, Mala Tokmachka–Polohy, and Kamianske–Mali Shcherbaky–Mala Tokmachka, frontlines until 7 June 2023, when Ukrainian forces would first attempt to push the fighting away from the settlement during the 2023 Ukrainian counteroffensive in the south.

Armed with new western equipment, the initial attack by Ukraine's 47th Assault Brigade and 33rd Mechanized Brigade went poorly. A Ukrainian tank column came under anti-tank missile fire while attempting to cross a minefield outside of the village. The failed attack would result in up to 25 Ukrainian vehicles becoming damaged or destroyed, including at least five Leopard 2, which would result in a good deal of negative coverage about the effectiveness of the new counteroffensive among multiple news and social media outlets. The total number of vehicles lost would be lessened by the later retrieval and repair of some of the damaged vehicles.

Despite the original set-back, Ukrainian Brigadier General Oleksii Hromov would claim that Ukrainian forces had advanced up to 3 km (1.9 mi) near the settlement since beginning their counteroffensive on 15 June. A lack of a major breakthrough on this part of the frontline for Ukrainian forces would lead to largely positional fighting being taken up by late June.

By May 2024, fighting was still ongoing in Robotyne, southwest of Mala Tokmachka, with only relatively minor positional fighting occurring up to this point. Between October and November 2025, Russian forces launched massive mechanized attacks on the village, capturing some parts of its territory. By 16 November 2025, Russian Ministry of Defence claimed that the settlement was fully under control of the Russian Army. According to Ukrainian government sources, as of April 2026, the village remained controlled by the Ukrainian forces.

On August 19, 2026, Russian forces claimed to have seized the village.

=== Coverage in media, symbolism and use in Russian propaganda ===
The village's resilience and continued presence in Russian propaganda channels have caused it to become the subject of numerous internet memes, which humourously exaggerate its strategic importance. Examples include classic posters such as The Motherland Calls You modified to include references to Mala Tokmachka, and the quote "Whoever controls Mala Tokmachka controls the world", falsely attributed to Otto von Bismarck.

Meduza said in May 2026 that a video of pro-Kremlin pundit Boris Rozhin repeatedly stating the village was ″nearly cleared″ had become the most popular military meme in 2026, also becoming a symbol of the lies of Russian military officials and bloggers. The village's name has also come to be associated with the gap between Russia's military ambitions and its actual capabilities. For Ukraine, the village has become a symbol of resilience, with the defense lasting over 1,500 days.

== Economy ==
There is a brick factory in Mala Tokmachka.

== Demographics ==
Population history
Year	Pop.	±% p.a.
1886	3,534	—
1970	4,406	+0.26%
2001	3,037	−1.19%
2016	3,005	−0.07%
2023	200	−32.10%

As of the 2001 Ukrainian census, Mala Tokmachka had a population of 3,037 people. By 2016, the number had slightly dropped to 3,005. The population consists almost entirely of ethnic Ukrainians. The native language composition in 2001 was as follows:

Native languages in Mala Tokmachka
	percent
Ukrainian	96.1%
Russian	3.8%
Belarusian	0.1%
others	0.0%

== Notable people ==
- Ivan Proskurov (1907–1941), Soviet pilot
- Serhiy Kulynych (born 1995), Ukrainian footballer

== See also ==
Nearby settlements

- Orikhiv
- Novopokrovka
- Novodanylivka
- Robotyne
