= 45th Guards Spetsnaz Brigade =

Russian Airborne Troops unit

45th Guards Orders of Kutuzov and Alexander Nevsky Spetsnaz Brigade
- 45th Spetsnaz Brigade shoulder sleeve insignia
- Active: 1994–present
- Country: Russia
- Branch: Russian Airborne Troops
- Type: Spetsnaz
- Size: Brigade (4 battalions)
- Part of: GRU (operational subordination)
- Garrison/HQ: Kubinka, Moscow Oblast; MUN 28337
- Mottos: Побеждает сильнейший (The strongest wins)
- Mascot: Wolf
- Engagements: First Chechen War; Second Chechen War; Georgian–Abkhazian conflict Insurgency in the North Caucasus; 2008 South Ossetia War; 2014 Russian military intervention in Ukraine; Russian invasion of Ukraine: Kyiv offensive (2022); 2023 Ukrainian counteroffensive; Battle of Mala Tokmachka
- Decorations: Order of Kutuzov; Order of Alexander Nevsky
- Battle honours: Guards

Commanders
- Current commander: Col. HoRF Vadim Pankov
- Notable commanders: Lt. Col. HoRF Anatoly Lebed

The 45th Guards Order of Kutuzov, Order of Alexander Nevsky Spetsnaz Brigade (Russian: 45-я гвардейская орденов Кутузова и Александра Невского бригада специального назначения (45-я ОБр СпН), romanized: 45-ya otdelnaya gvardeyskaya ordenov Kutuzova i Aleksandra Nevskogo brigada spetsialnogo naznacheniya (45-ya OBr SpN); Military Unit Number 28337) is the only spetsnaz unit of the Russian Airborne Forces (VDV), based near Moscow. It was formed in 1994 as the 45th Independent Spetsnaz Regiment and expanded to a brigade in 2015.

Their main role is direct action and special reconnaissance behind enemy lines. They may also conduct kinetic operations against command and control posts and headquarters.

== Creation ==
The unit was created in 1994, as a regiment comprising the 901st Air Assault Battalion and the 218th Spetsnaz Battalion of the Russian Airborne Forces. Colonel Pavel Popovskikh is credited with the creation of the 45th Spetsnaz as a “subunit of the future”, designed to wage the counterinsurgency warfare for which the Russian armed forces had been so ill-prepared in Afghanistan.

The regiment was composed of two special purpose battalions and equipped with 15 BTR-80 and 1 BTR-D:

- 218th Battalion was formed in 1992 and is based in Moscow-Sokolniki;
- 901st Battalion was formed on November 20, 1979.

In 2016, the regiment was upgraded to a brigade and its Spetsnaz companies were tripled from six to eighteen, increasing the capability of the unit from two operational areas to three. The unit is part of the Russian Airborne Forces and directly subordinate to VDV Headquarters. However, it is operationally also subordinate to the GRU.

== History ==
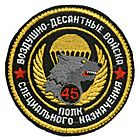
Old and unofficial patch of the 45th Regiment

The brigade was formed on the basis of two battalions, each of which had a history of establishment and development. With an initial strength of 800 highly qualified personnel, the unit had especially powerful special reconnaissance capabilities and innovations, including unmanned surveillance aircraft and tailored psychological warfare assets. Almost all of its officers were “prepared in the GRU spetsnaz system”.

The 901st battalion was formed on November 20, 1979, on the territory of the Transcaucasian Military District, and was immediately transferred to Czechoslovakia, Central Group of Forces. In March 1989, in connection with the withdrawal of Soviet troops from Eastern Europe, the battalion was relocated to Aluksne, Latvian SSR and transferred to the Baltic Military District. In May 1991, the battalion was transferred to the Transcaucasian Military District and relocated in Sukhumi, Abkhaz ASSR. In August 1992, the battalion was transferred from the Transcaucasian Military District and subordinated to the staff of the VDV and renamed 901st Separate Airborne Battalion. As a separate battalion, it was transferred to the 7th Guards Airborne Division.

=== War in Abkhazia (1992–93) ===
In 1993, during the Georgian-Abkhazian conflict, the battalion performed tasks for the protection and defense from looting and destruction of important military and government facilities in the territory of Abkhazia. During this period, eight members of the battalion were killed, before the end of performing their military duty, and about 20 men were wounded. For combat missions thirteen men were awarded order "for personal courage", twenty-one men the medal "for courage" and one man the medal "for merit".

In October 1993, the battalion was relocated from the city of Sukhumi to the Moscow region, where in February the following year it was transformed into the 901st Special Purpose Battalion. With the beginning of the formation of the Special Purpose Regiment, the battalion was included in its composition.

The 218th Battalion of Special Forces Airborne Troops was formed July 25, 1992. By order of the Commander of the Airborne Troops in the historical continuity this day is considered to be the day of formation of this battalion. The battalion was involved as a peacekeeping force in the zones of inter-ethnic conflict in the Transdniester region in June and July 1992, in North Ossetia in September–November, 1992 and in Abkhazia in December 1992. Many battalion members were awarded State Awards for bravery and heroism.

=== Chechen Wars and North Caucasus insurgency ===
Active use of this battalion in solving special tasks in various conflicts showed the need to build other special forces with similar tasks in the airborne troops and their integration in the regiment. By July 1994, the regiment was fully formed, staffed with personnel, equipment and proceeded to battle school. December 2, 1994, the regiment traveled to the Northern Caucasus to take part in the operations against rebel forces on the territory of the Chechen Republic. During the period from December 12, 1994, to January 25, 1995, reconnaissance groups and groups of special units of the regiment, in conjunction with the parts of the Airborne Troops, took part in the fighting on the most important targets of the enemy, including partaking in the Battle of Grozny (1994–95). On February 12, 1995, parts and units of the regiment returned to their permanent home base in Sukhumi.

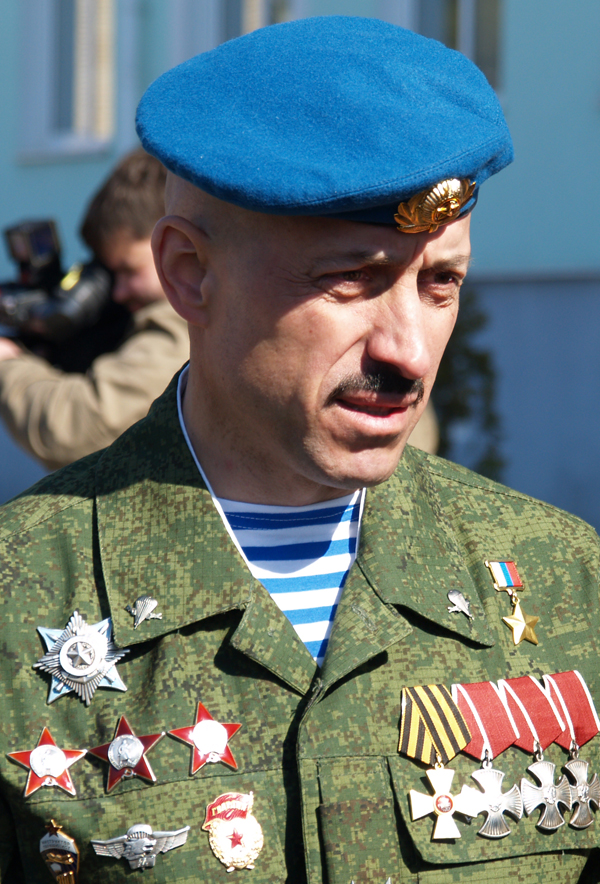
Anatoly Lebed was a famous paratrooper and commanding officer of the regiment.

By March 15, 1995, the consolidated unit the regiment newly arrived in Chechnya, continuing to carry out combat missions until June 13, 1995. By Decree of the President of the Russian Federation dated July 21, 1995, Commander of the intelligence group special purpose Senior Lieutenant Ermakova, for the courage and heroism shown during the special task command to disarm Chechen rebels, was awarded the title Hero of the Russian Federation (posthumous). On July 30, 1995, the unit solemnly opened the monument in memory of the Scouts. On May 9, 1995, the regiment was awarded the diploma of the President of the Russian Federation for services to the Russian Federation. The regiment participated in the parade dedicated to the 50th Anniversary of the Victory over Nazi Germany.

From February to May 1997, the consolidated unit the regiment took part in the peacekeeping mission in the zone of separation of Georgian and Abkhaz armed forces in the town of Gudauta. On July 26, 1997, the regiment was given the battle flag and charter of the 5th Guards Mukachevo Order of Kutuzov 2nd class Airborne Rifle Regiment of the 2nd Guards Airborne Division, which had been disbanded on June 27, 1945, in order to provide historical continuity from the airborne units of World War II.

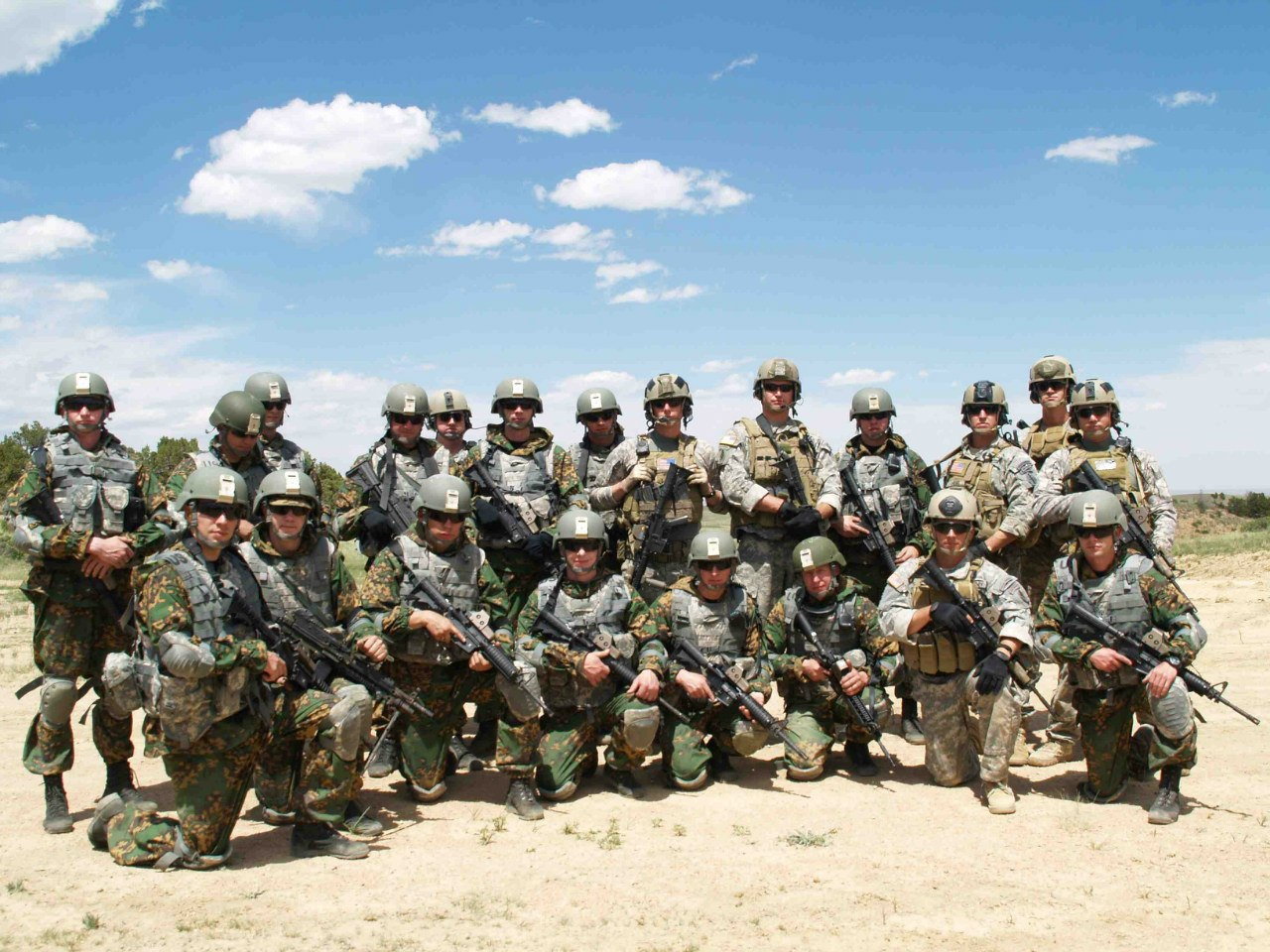
Scouts of the 45th Regiment during a joint exercises with the 10th SFG (A) at the Fort Carson, 2012.

From September 12, the Regiment took part in special reconnaissance and anti-terrorist operations in the North Caucasus.

=== Russo-Ukrainian War ===
==== Russian annexation of Crimea and the war in Donbas ====
In March 2014, the Finnish magazine Suomen Sotilas (Soldier of Finland) analyzed photos taken during the Russian annexation of Crimea, and identified a range of weapons and equipment seen on them as Russian issue only. It asserted with a very high probability that the foreign troops "are the 45th Guards Separate Reconnaissance Regiment of the VDV" based in Kubinka, Moscow.

Masked troops, allegedly of the Russian 45th Regiment, were operating in Sloviansk and Kramatorsk, Donetsk region, First Deputy Prime Minister of Ukraine Vitaliy Yarema told reporters on 15 April 2014, in Poltava region:

"We have identified those persons who are now in Sloviansk and Kramatorsk. They represent a unit of the 45th Regiment "Kupyanka −1", which is housed near Moscow. This unit is now operating in the territory of Ukraine."

==== Russian Invasion of Ukraine ====
In January 2022, elements of the brigade were reportedly deployed to Belarus during the prelude to the Russian invasion of Ukraine. On 24 February 2022 elements of the 45th assaulted Hostomel airport (Antonov), but advanced no further toward Kyiv. It withdrew from Hostomel airport to Belarus or Russia before 2 April 2022.

In June 2023 the brigade was one of the units manning fortifications south of Mala Tokmachka in Zaporizhzhia Oblast. They were present defending their positions during the Ukrainian Summer Counteroffensive.

== Public relations ==
The regiment has staged youth competitions for militarily applicable sports among military patriotic clubs. At different celebrations in Moscow and the Moscow region, it held demonstrations and skydiving performances by paratroopers, with commandos demonstrating hand-to-hand fighting. Every year since 1995, a special operations group, formed on the basis of the regiment, takes part in the international competition among special forces from the United States, Germany, Belgium, Spain, Greece, Serbia, Romania, Bulgaria and Russia, held in Bulgaria on the Partnership for Peace Program. In 1996, the regiment took the prize-winning group a third place in the overall standings, and the next year became the champion of 1997. Soldiers from the brigade took part in the 2010 Kyiv Victory Day Parade on the Khreshchatyk as part of a joint contingent with the Ukrainian Hetman Bohdan Khmelnytsky Independent Presidential Guard Regiment.

45th Spetsnaz Brigade during West 2021 exercise
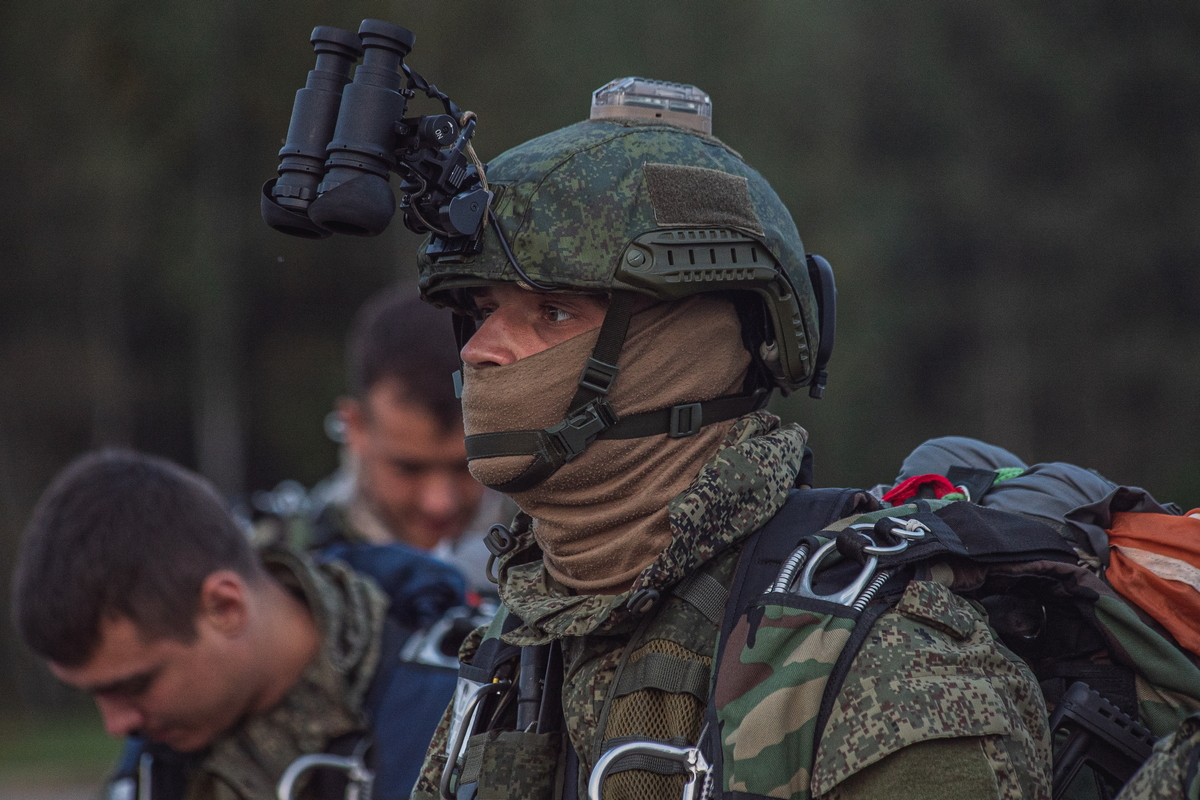

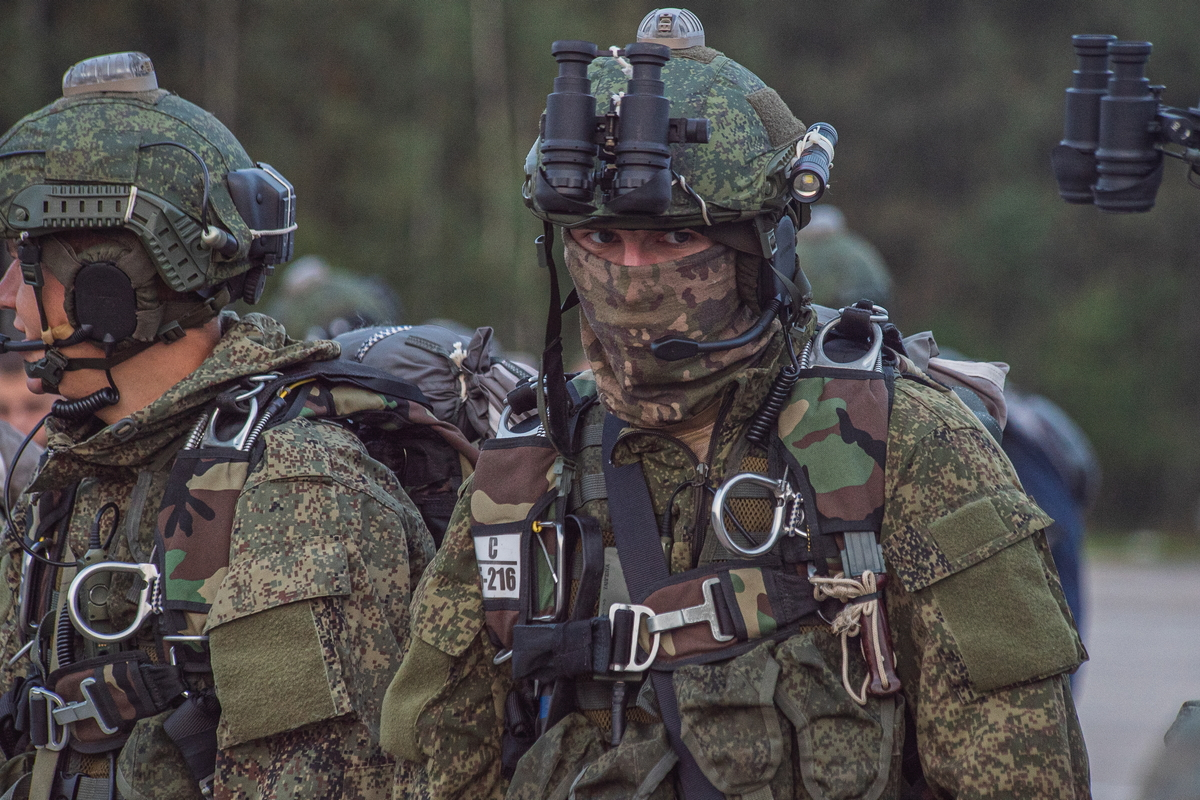

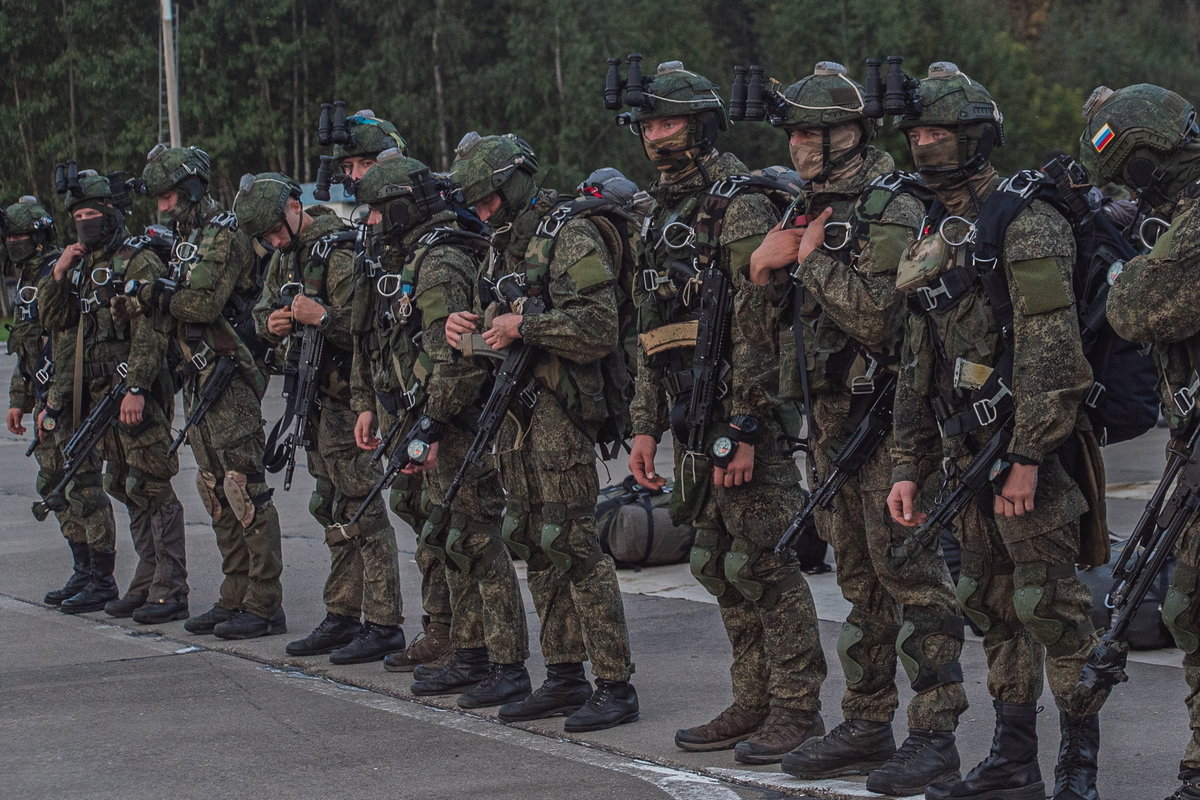

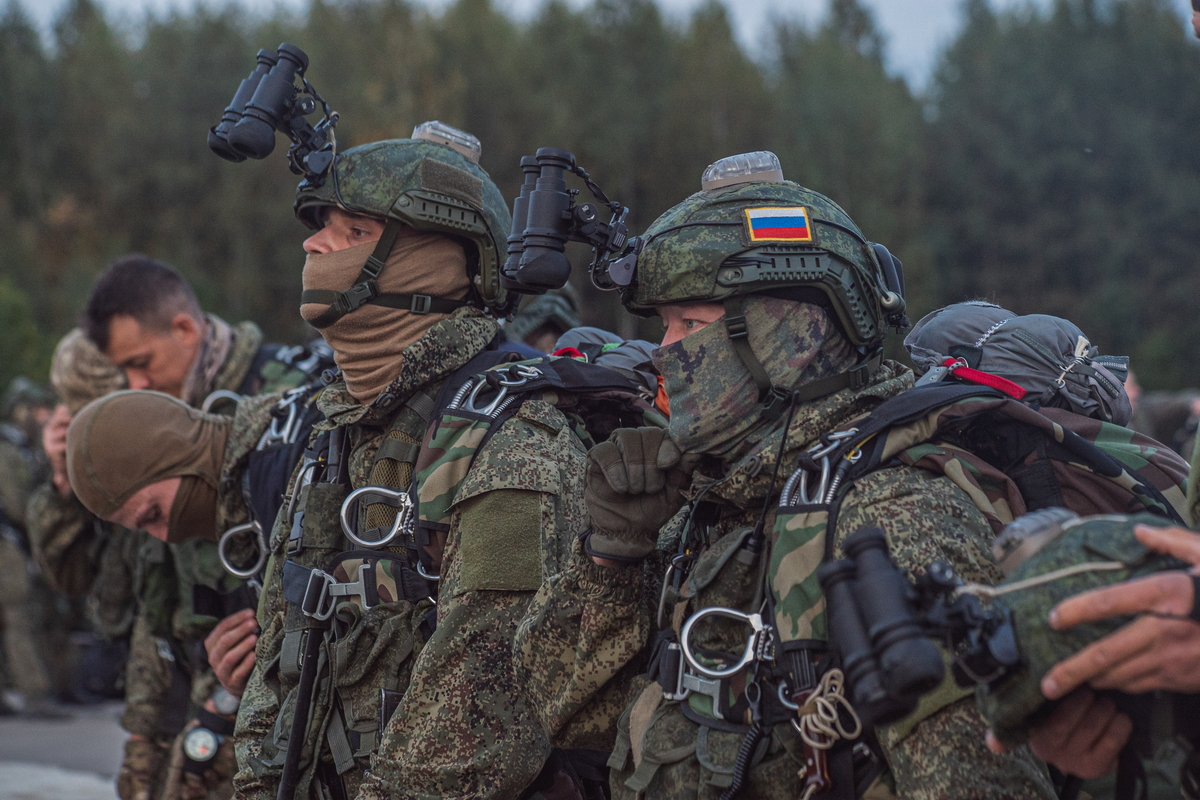

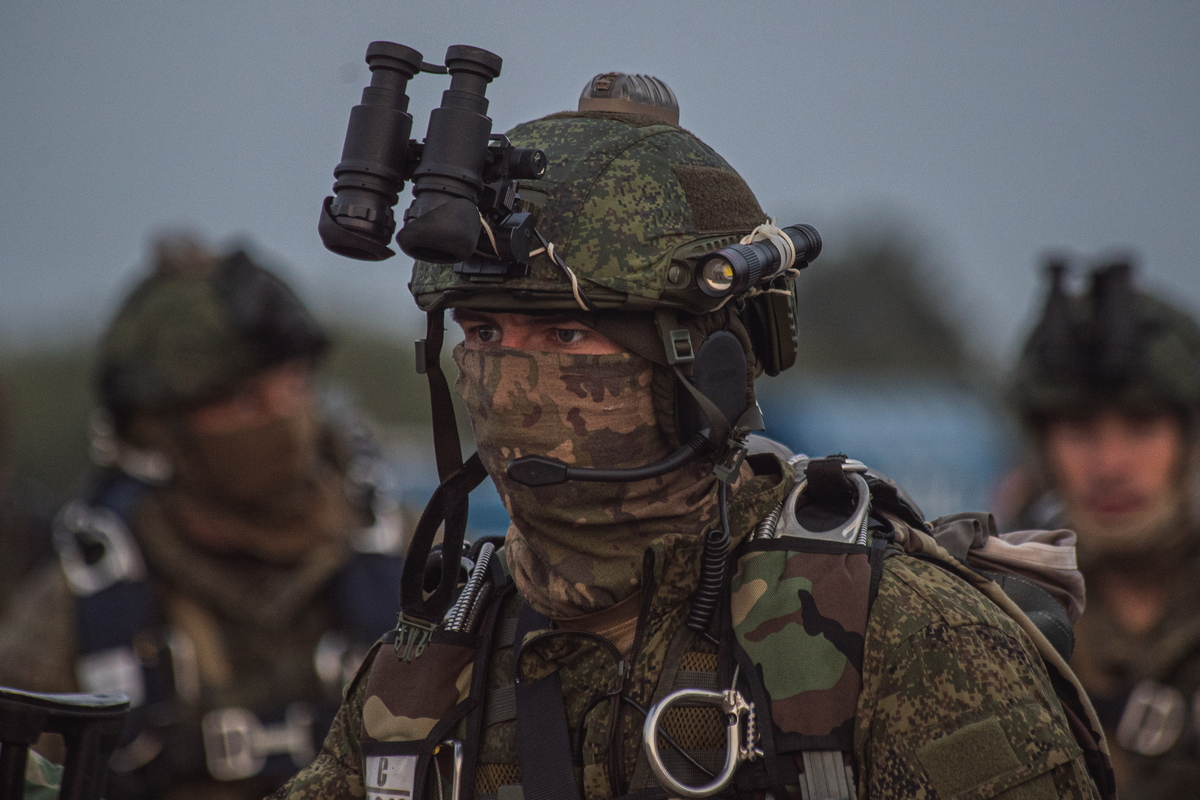

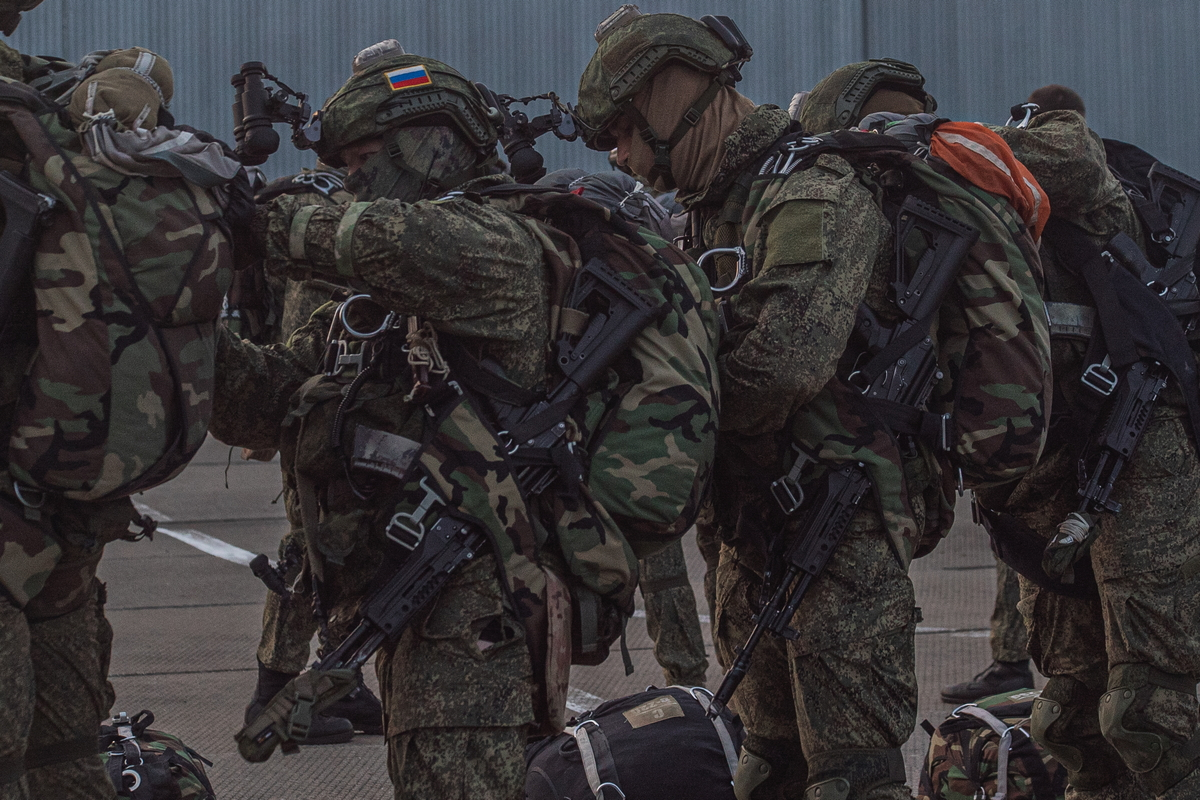

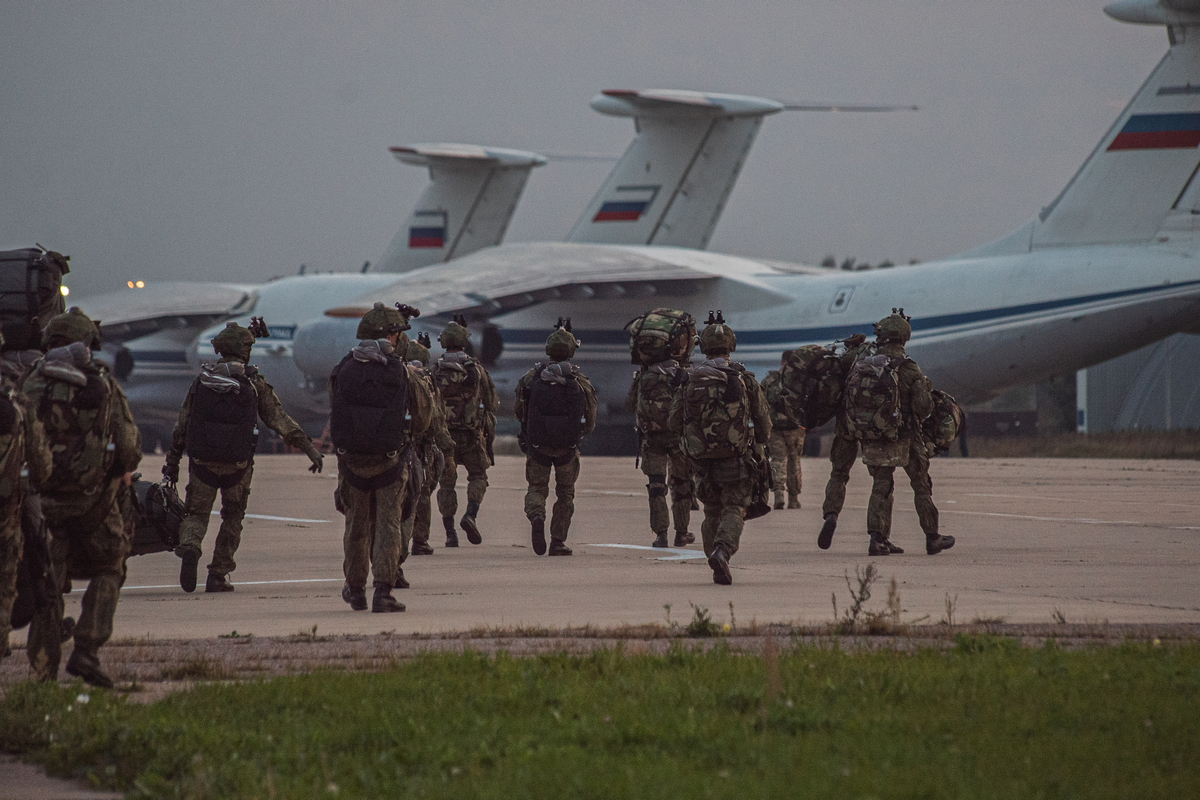

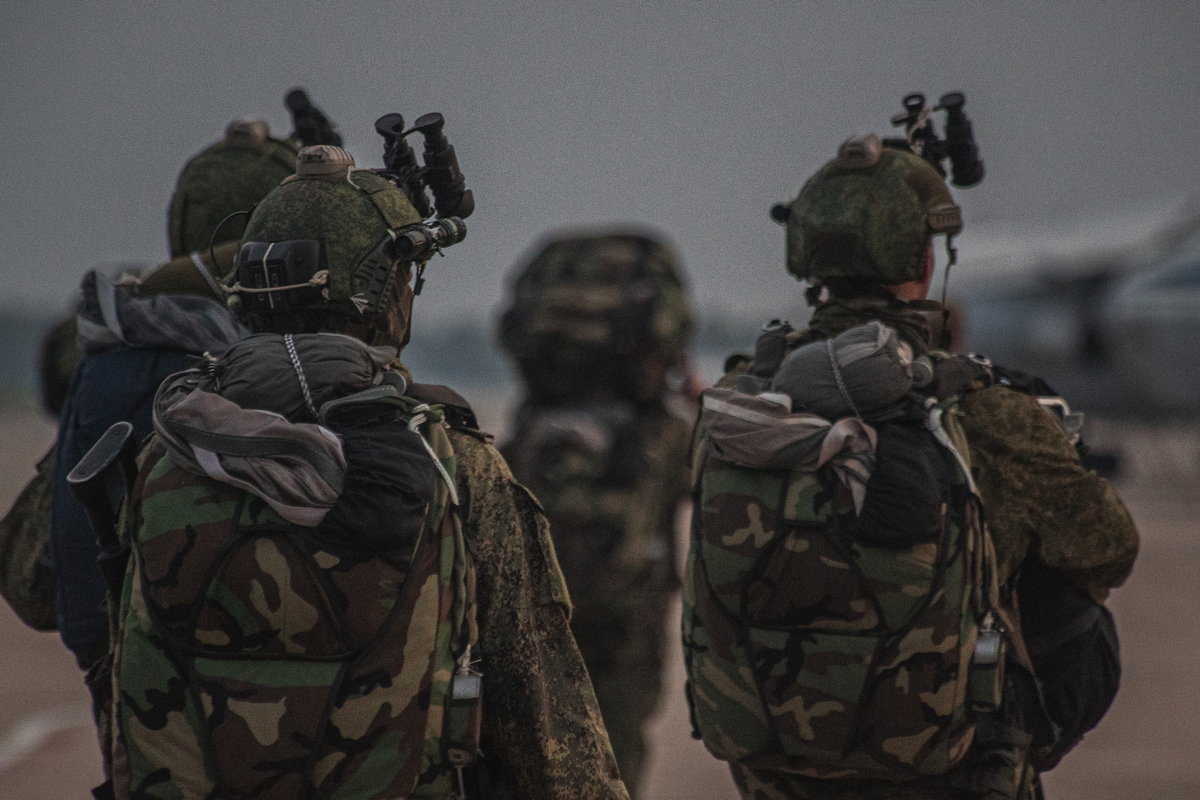

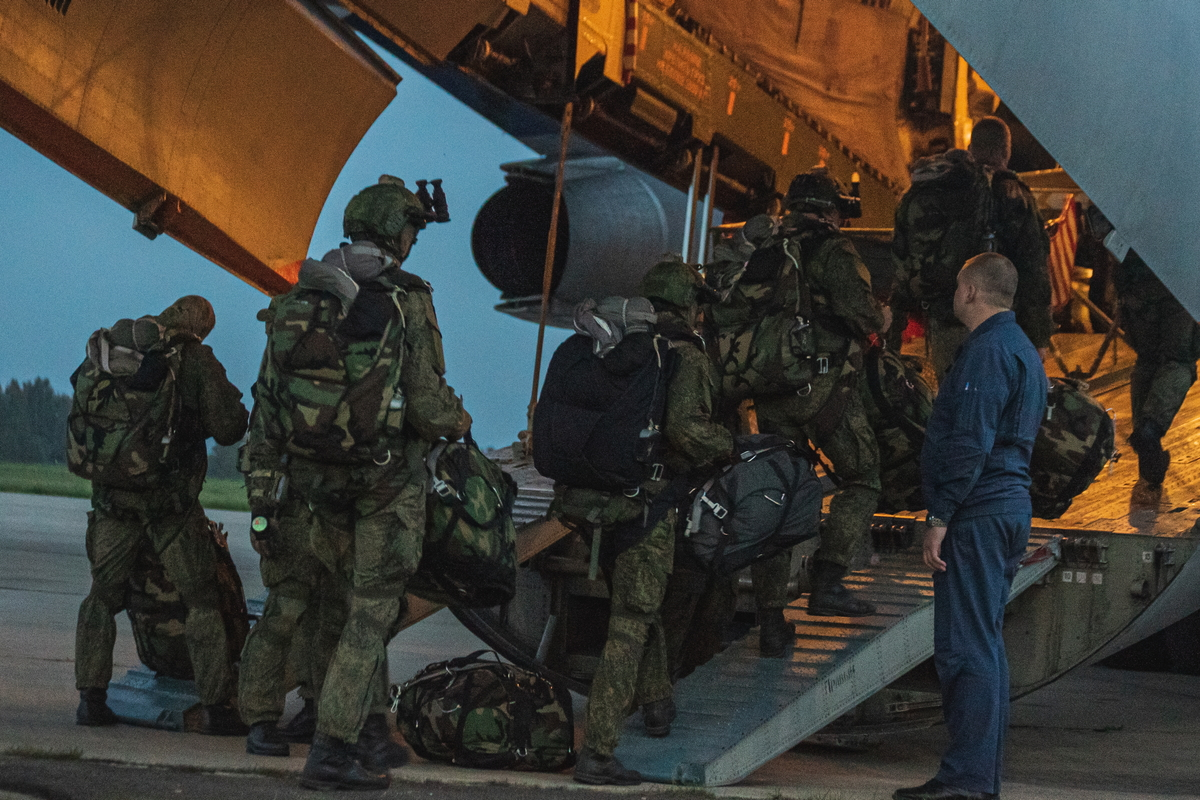

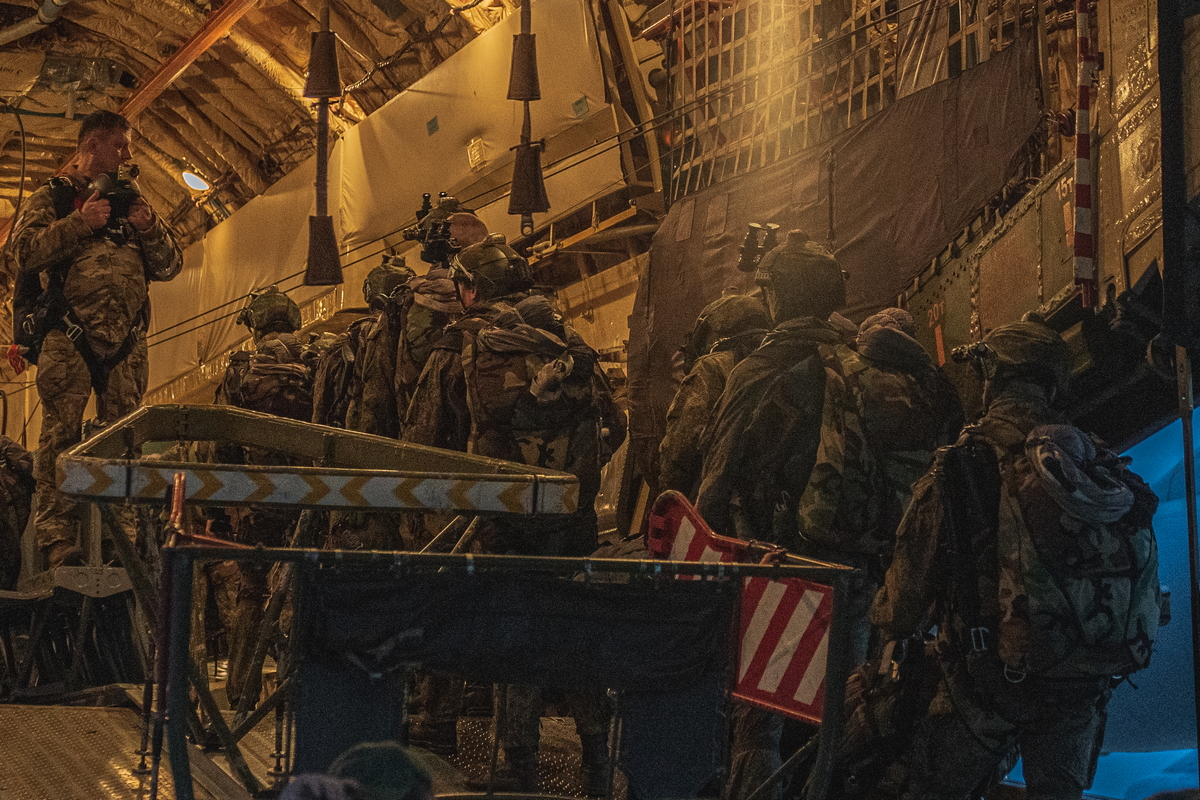

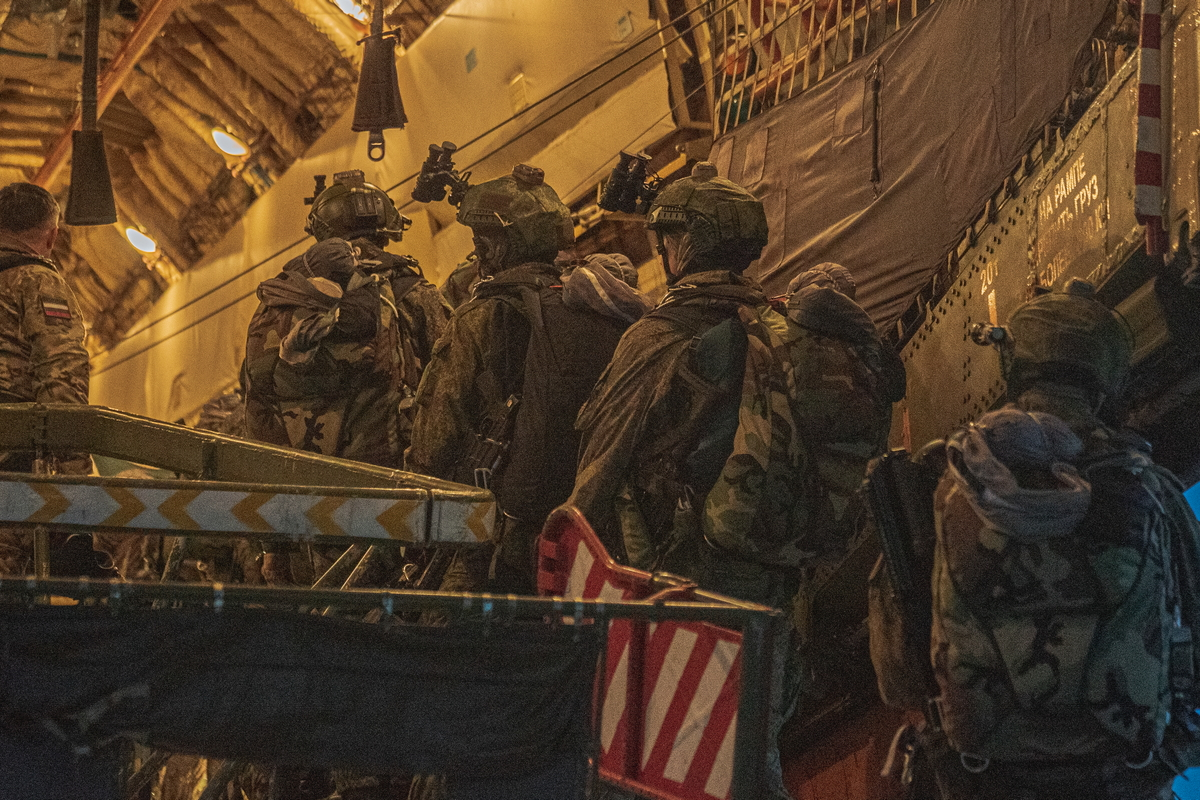

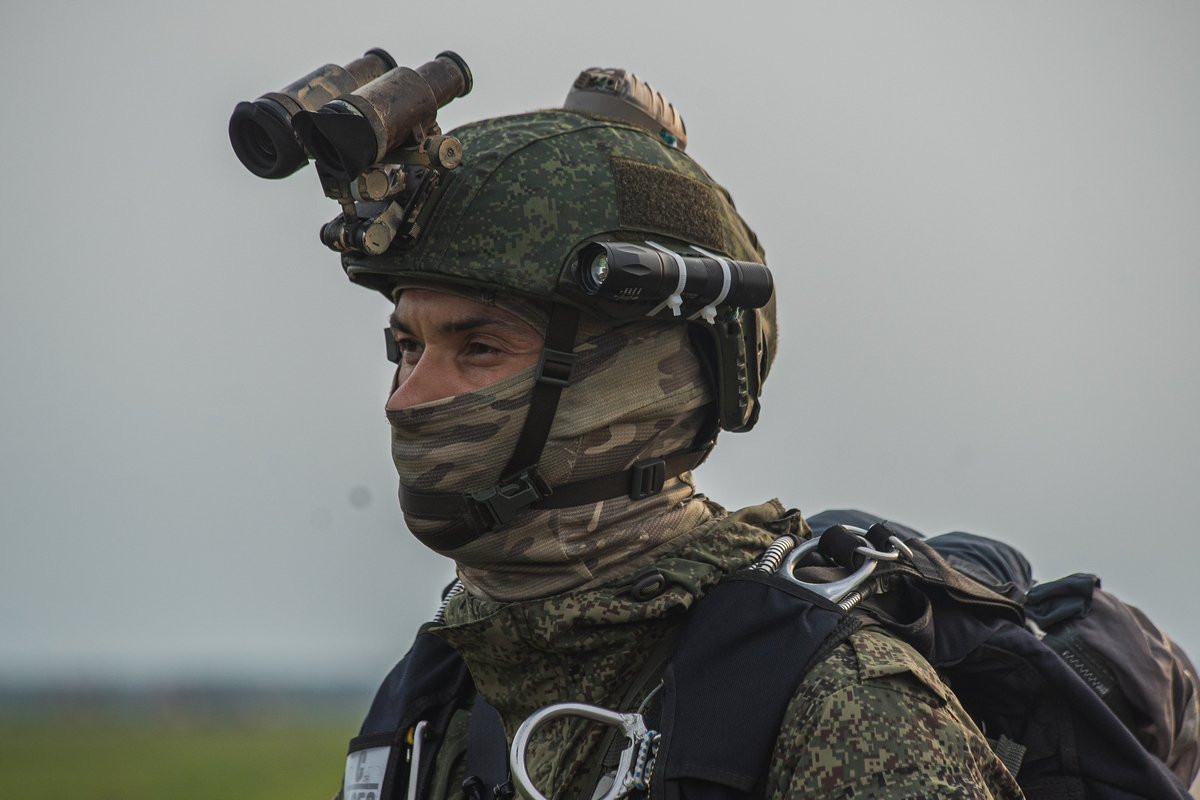

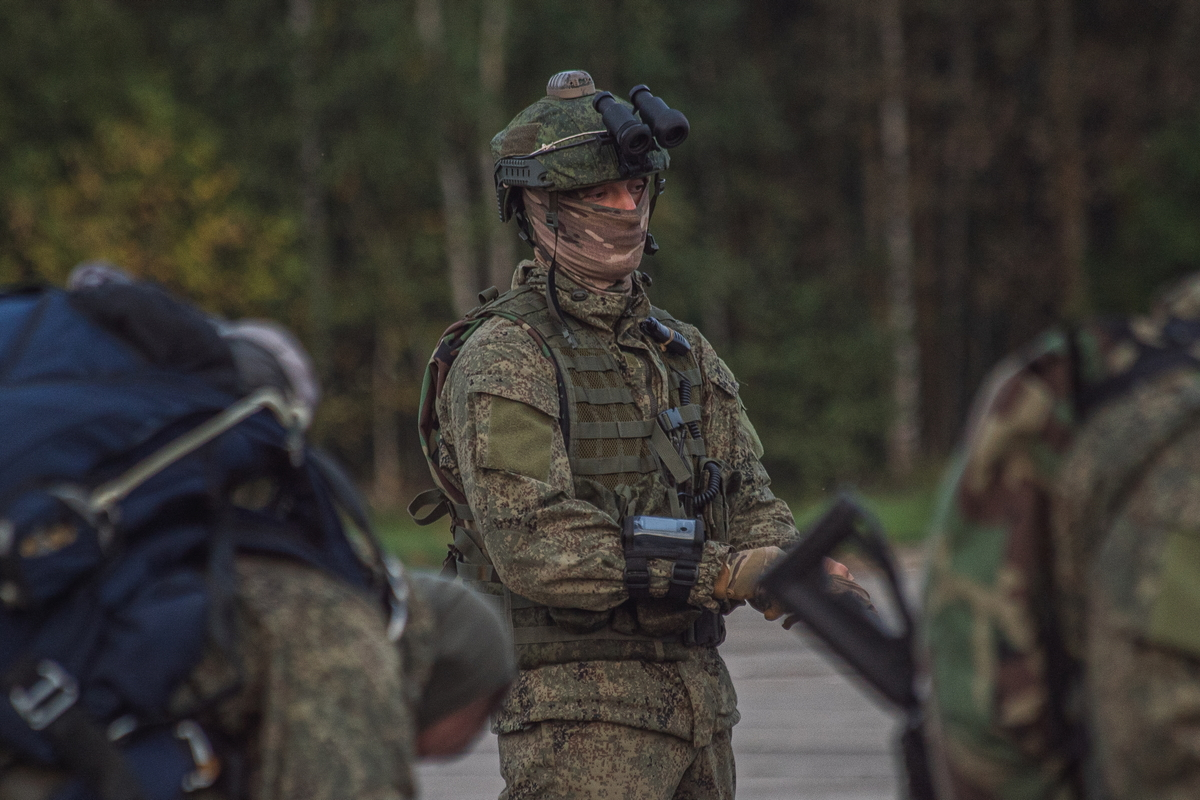

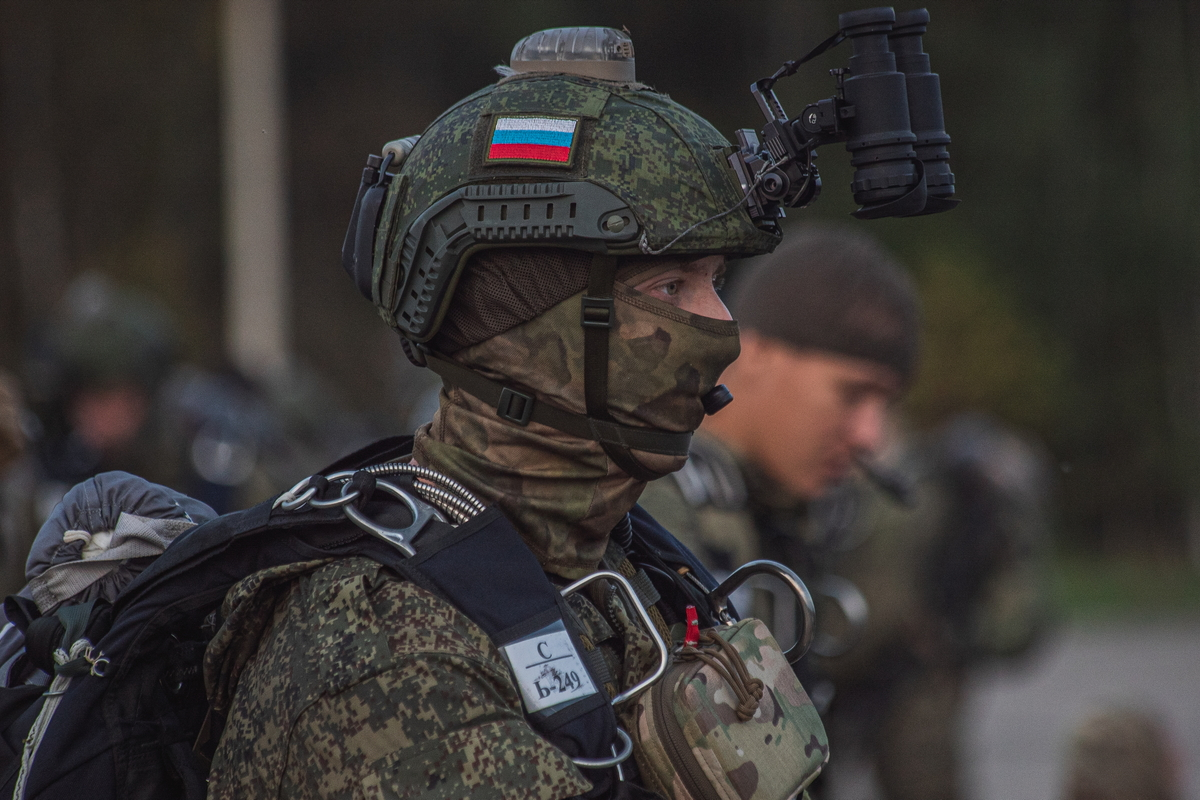

== Decorated servicemen ==
Five military personnel from the regiment have been awarded the title Hero of the Russian Federation. Others awarded with orders and medals include:

- The Order of Courage – 79
- The Order of Military Merit – 17
- The Order "For Merit to the Fatherland" – 3
- The Medal of the Order "For Merit to the Fatherland", 2nd class with swords – 10
- The Medal "For Courage" – 174
- The Medal of Suvorov – 166
- The Medal of Zhukov – 7

== See also ==
- List of special forces units
