= Battle of Mala Tokmachka =

Battle during the 2023 Ukrainian counteroffensive

Coordinates: 47°31′58″N 35°53′49″E

- Part of the 2023 Ukrainian counteroffensive during the Russo-Ukrainian war (2022–present)
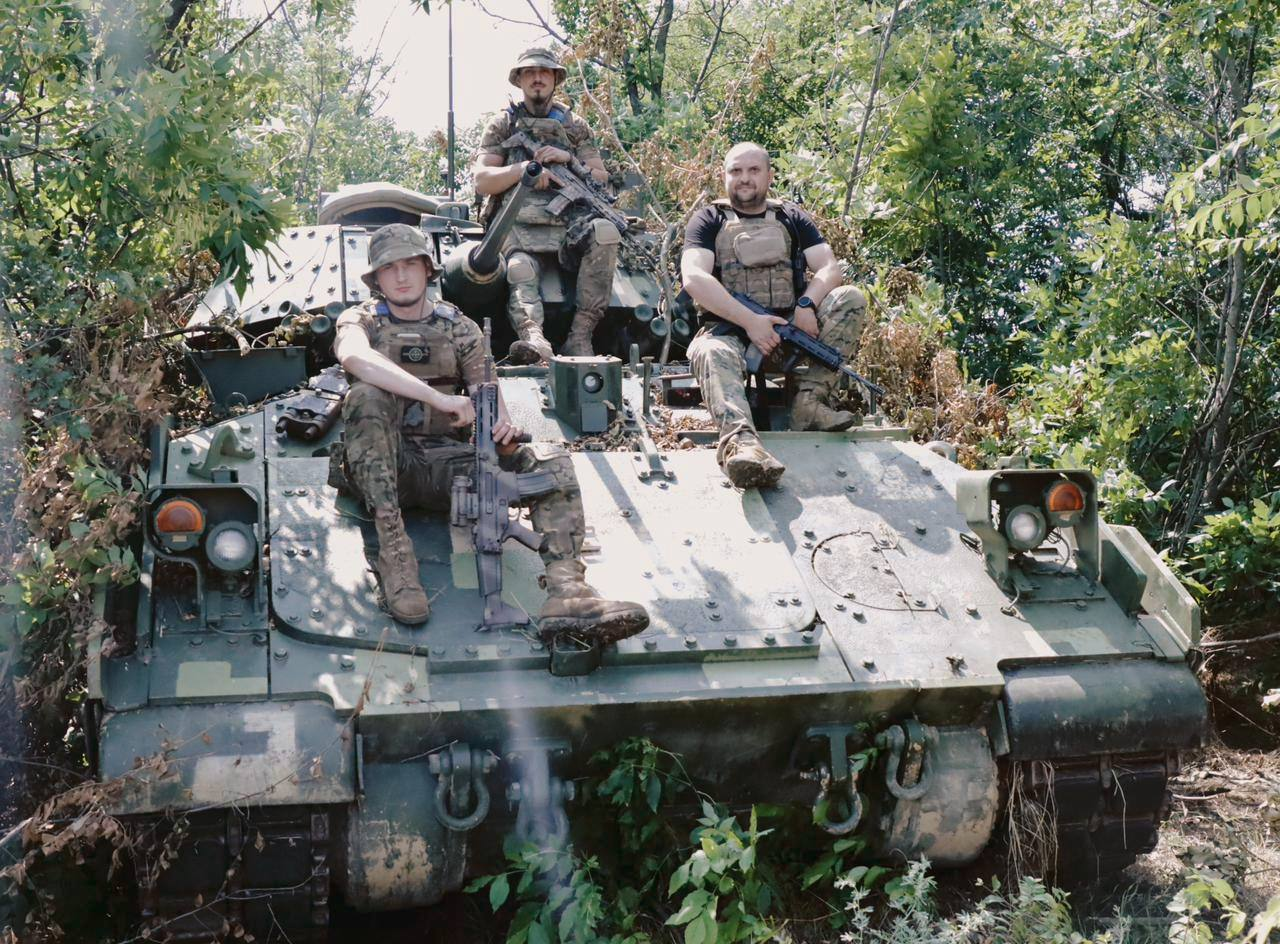
- A Bradley IFV of the Ukrainian 47th Mechanized Brigade in July 2023
Date	7–9 June 2023
Location	Near Mala Tokmachka, Zaporizhia Oblast, Ukraine
Result	Russian victory

Belligerents
Russia	Ukraine

Commanders and leaders
Roman Demurchiyev	Oleksandr Sak

Units involved
Russian Armed Forces: 58th Combined Arms Army; 42nd Guards Motor Rifle Division; 70th Guards Motor Rifle Regiment; 291st Motor Rifle Regiment; GRU; 22nd Separate Guards Special Purpose Brigade (in reserve); 45th Guards Spetsnaz Brigade (in reserve)	Armed Forces of Ukraine: 33rd Mechanized Brigade; 47th Mechanized Brigade

Strength
over 10,000	Unknown

Casualties and losses
Per David Axe; Light	Per David Axe; 30% of Ukrainian soldiers killed or wounded 25 tanks, IFVs and APCs destroyed 2 Leopard 2 captured Per Russia (Note: Between 8 June and 9 June); 350 killed 30 tanks 40 IFVs and APCs destroyed 2 Leopard 2 captured

In June 2023, a battle took place around the village of Mala Tokmachka as part of the 2023 Ukrainian counteroffensive and during the Russian invasion of Ukraine.

== Background ==
At the beginning of the Russian invasion of Ukraine in 2022, Mala Tokmachka quickly became a frontline settlement. The population would drop to only around 200 people by May 2023 due to the proximity of the fighting to the village and consistent Russian shelling which destroyed much of the local infrastructure and utilities. On 13 June 2023, French researcher Philippe Gros referred to the Ukrainian counteroffensive operations south of Mala Tokmachka as a "major axis", with the intention of advancing in the direction of the occupied city of Melitopol, which had been captured by Russian forces early into the invasion. David Axe of Forbes wrote that "perhaps 10,000 or more" Russian soldiers from the 70th, 291st, 429th, and 503rd Motor Rifle Regiments from the 58th Combined Arms Army's 42nd Guards Motor Rifle Division were stationed on the front lines near Tokmak. The 22nd and 45th Guards Spetsnaz Brigades were also reported by Axe to be in reserve.

== Battle ==
On 7 June 2023, Ukrainian forces would first attempt to push the fighting away from the settlement while the Ukrainian 47th Mechanized Brigade and 33rd Mechanized Brigade would launch a mechanized assault on the village. Despite being armed with new western equipment, the initial attack went poorly. Russian scouts from the 70th and 291st motor rifle regiments spotted the Ukrainian armored column and called in Ka 52 attack helicopters. The Ukrainian tank column came under anti-tank missile and small arms fire while attempting to cross a minefield outside of the village. Trapped under fire and taking losses, the column retreated. Crews bailed out of their disabled vehicles and dragged dead and wounded with them out of the battlefield. Forbes reported that Ukrainian equipment loses were one IMR-2, a one Leopard 2A6 and as many as nine Bradleys with some of their crews surviving. The ISW reported that the Russian Ministry of Defense responded to the Ukrainian attack with an uncharacteristic degree of coherency and praised the 42nd Guards Motor Rifle Division, 70th Guards Motor Rifle Regiment and 291st Motor Rifle Regiment for repelling the Ukrainian attack and regaining lost positions.

On 8 June, the 47th Mechanized Brigade attempted to use 6 Finnish donated Leopard 2R mine cleaning tanks, a German donated WiSENT and a Soviet-era BMR-2 to breach the Russian minefield but were forced to abandon 3 of the Leopard 2Rs and both the Wisent and the BMR-2 after one of the Leopard 2Rs struck a TM-62 anti tank mine and Russian helicopters and artillery hit the others vehicles. Fifty-percent of the 47th Brigade’s engineer battalion became casualties, however Forbes reported that the unit was still intact citing a video that the battalion posted after the engagement showing a Leopard 2R, two Soviet-style armored tractors fitted with UR-77 rocket-propelled mine clearing charges and a German Wisent.

On 9 June, Ukrainian forces launched a second mechanized assault capturing one height near the village. The assault group later came under artillery fire after being spotted by Russian drone operators and were forced to retreat.

== Aftermath ==
=== Vehicle and personnel losses ===
David Axe, a Forbes journalist, opined that the Ukrainian defeat near Mala Tokmachka was a military disaster, with both the 33rd and 47th losing 15% of their soldiers killed or wounded, and losing a fifth of Ukraine's M2 Bradleys, a fifth of its Leopard 2A6s and half its Leopard 2Rs with Russian forces in return only suffering light casualties. Photographic evidence showed that at least 4 Leopard 2A6 tanks, 3 Leopard 2R demining tanks, 17 Bradley infantry fighting vehicles, and 1 Wisent were destroyed. The battle was also the first documented loss of a Leopard 2 during the Russo-Ukrainian war. Some of the damaged vehicles were later recovered and repaired by Ukrainian forces. Ukrainian sources claimed that Russian forces were inflating Ukrainian equipment losses at Mala Tokmachka. Russian forces would later publish a video on 13 June showing 2 captured Leopard 2 tanks and multiple M2 Bradleys.

=== Changes to strategy ===
The defeat at Mala Tokmachka resulted in Ukrainian commanders switching to dismounted infantry attacks rather than mechanized assaults in order to not risk more armored vehicles. This would result in lowered armor losses but higher infantry casualties. On 30 June 2023, the Institute for the Study of War opined that the lack of a major breakthrough by Ukrainian forces around Mala Tokmachka would lead to less attacks and the beginning of positional fighting.

It was later reported that Russian forces quadrupled the depth of their defensive minefields, from 120 meters to 500 meters and also increased the density of mines within the expanded fields.

=== Further combat near Mala Tokmachka ===
On 12 June, Russian military reporters said that Russian forces counterattacked Ukrainian positions south of Orikhiv.

On 15 June, Ukrainian Brigadier-General Oleksii Hromov told a media briefing that Ukrainian forces had advanced by up to 3 km (1.8 miles) near Mala Tokmachka.

On 21 June, Ukrainian General Staff spokesperson Andriy Kovalev claimed that Ukrainian forces had made several gains around Mala Tokmachka.

On 28 June, Markus posted a video on Facebook about how he and soldiers under his command captured a Russian trench after 24 hours of assaults and were exhausted.

=== 47th Brigade leadership ===
On 30 June 2023 headmaster Sergeant Major Valerii Markus of the 47th Mechanized Brigade met with President of Ukraine Volodymyr Zelenskyy and complained about the decisions of the unit's command regarding lack of interest in soldiers' morale and officers' incompetence during the battle. Markus was later voluntarily demoted to private after calling the brigade's commander, Lt. Col. Oleksandr Sak an "immoral degenerate". Sak would later be sacked on 16 September 2023 and replaced by colonel Oleksandr Pavlii. A Ukrainian veteran of the 47th Mechanized Brigade who lost his leg during the battle, Mykola Melnyk, criticized the leadership of the battle but praised the American-donated M2 Bradleys during an interview saying: "The Bradley withstood everything".
