= Anatoly Lebed =

Russian Airborne Forces officer (1963–2012)

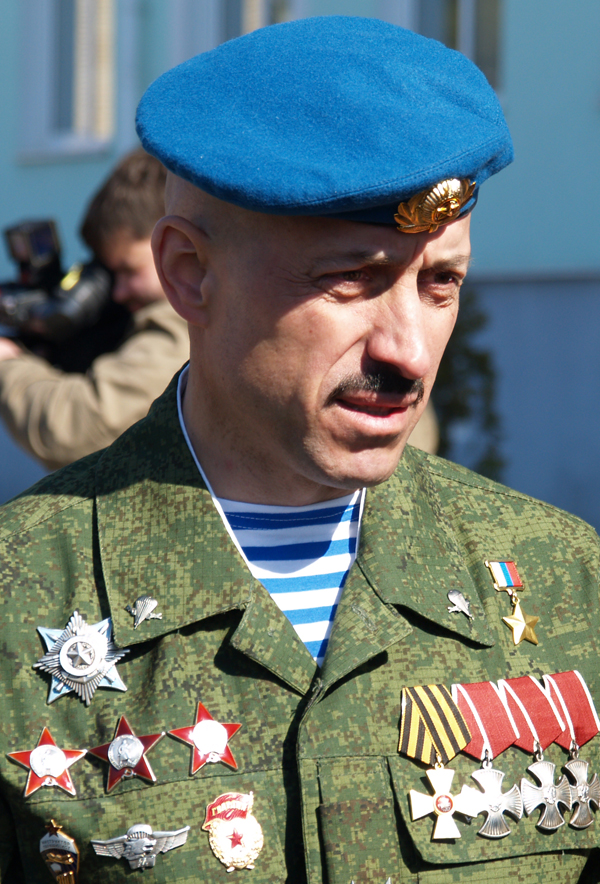
- Lieutenant Colonel Anatoly Lebed

Personal details
- Born: Anatoly Vyacheslavovich Lebed; Анатолий Вячеславович Лебедь; 10 May 1963 Valga, Estonian SSR, Soviet Union
- Died: 27 April 2012 (aged 48) Moscow, Russia
- Profession: Paratrooper
- Awards

Military service
- Allegiance: Soviet Union; Russia
- Branch/service: Soviet Army; Russian Army; Russian Airborne Forces
- Years of service: 1981–1994; 1999–2012
- Rank: Lieutenant colonel
- Commands: 45th Guards Spetsnaz Regiment
- Battles/wars: Soviet–Afghan War; Kosovo War; War in Dagestan; Second Chechen War; Russo-Georgian War

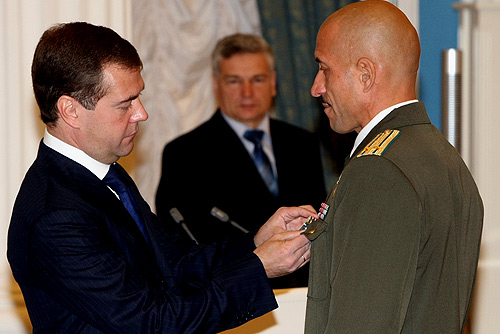
President Medvedev decorating Lt Col Lebed with the Order of St George 4th class on October 1, 2008

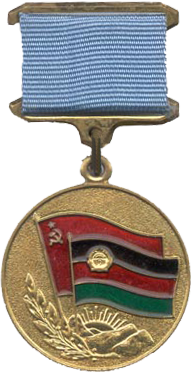
Medal "From the Grateful Afghan People"

Anatoly Vyacheslavovich Lebed (Russian: Анатолий Вячеславович Лебедь; 10 May 1963 – 27 April 2012) was a Russian Airborne Forces officer. He was a recipient of the Hero of the Russian Federation and was a lieutenant colonel in the Airborne Forces, and commanded the 45th Guards Spetsnaz Regiment, the special operations unit of the Airborne Forces.

== Biography ==
=== Soviet military service ===
Lebed was born in the city of Valga, Estonia. He joined the Soviet Army in 1981 starting his military service in Airborne Troops. He first trained in the 44th Airborne Division in Gaižiūnai in the Lithuanian SSR and later served in the 57th Independent Air Assault Brigade in Taldykorgan in the Kazakh SSR.

Opting for a career change, he entered the Lomonosov Military Aviation Technical School graduating as a flight engineer in 1986. He served on combat operations in Afghanistan in 1986–87 as an aircrew member in a helicopter regiment. During this time he served as a flight engineer in a crew of one of the only four men awarded both Hero of Russia and Hero of the Soviet Union titles, then-captain Nikolai Maydanov, often engaging in the ground action himself.

After his return from Afghanistan, he served successively in the Group of Soviet Forces in Germany, in the Trans-Baikal and Siberian military districts in the 329th Transport & Combat Helicopter Regiment and in the 337th Independent Helicopter Regiment.

His service had earned him the Order "For Service to the Homeland in the Armed Forces" 3rd class and three Orders of the Red Star.

=== Russian Federation military service ===
He retired to the reserves in 1994 and worked for the Afghan Veterans benevolent fund.

He joined a group of Russian veterans who volunteered in the Kosovo War (1998–99). In 1999, he went to the North Caucasus as a volunteer in the combined militias after purchasing his own equipment and flying to Makhachkala in Dagestan. When military operations moved into Chechnya in October 1999, he went to Moscow and re-enlisted in the service signing a contract with the Ministry of Defence of the Russian Federation and immediately returned to Chechnya to participate in counter-terrorism operations. From 1999 to 2007, he made over 10 trips to Chechnya and participated in special operations in the areas of the cities of Gudermes and Argun, as well as in the suburbs of Grozny and the Vedeno region.

In 2003, while engaged in combat in the Ulus-Kert mountains, he stepped on a mine and lost a foot. He refused to resign from the armed forces, his superior physical fitness allowing him to remain in service, to carry on parachuting (over 840 jumps) and still to do martial arts with the prosthesis.

On January 9, 2005, his patrol was ambushed; refusing to let his injured men be captured by the enemy, he single-handedly engaged and overcame an enemy superior in numbers.

In a subsequent battle on January 24, 2005, he was injured by multiple fragment wounds in the back while shielding his men from the blast of a rocket-propelled grenade. Even wounded, he personally neutralised the enemy rocket and machine gun post, before continuing to lead the patrol, resulting in the capture and destruction of a terrorist base.

He was awarded the title of Hero of the Russian Federation on April 6, 2005, by presidential decree citing "courage and heroism in the performance of military duties in the North Caucasus". He then held the rank of captain.

His actions during the 2008 South Ossetia war earned him the honour of becoming only the second Knight of the Order of St. George 4th class. During the October 1, 2008 award ceremony, Russian President Dmitry Medvedev said of Lebed: "Among us there is a Special Forces officer, a Hero of the Russian Federation, Anatoly Vyacheslavovich Lebed. He always led from the front during combat operations, always displaying the epitome of personal courage itself".

An avid biker, on April 27, 2012, in Moscow, Lebed was killed in a motorcycle accident.

== Awards ==
- Hero of the Russian Federation (6 April 2005)
- Order of St George 4th Class (18 August 2008)
- Order of Courage (3 times; 28 April 2000, 2 February 2004 and 26 January 2007)
- Order of the Red Star (3 times)
- Order for Service to the Homeland in the Armed Forces of the USSR 3rd Class
- Medal for Distinguished Military Service 1st Class (MoD RF)
- Medal for Distinguished Military Service 2nd Class (MoD RF)
- Medal "For Impeccable Service" 3rd Class (USSR) 1991
- Jubilee Medal "70 Years of the Armed Forces of the USSR" 1988
- Decoration "For Service in the Caucasus" Gold
- Badge "Warrior-Internationalist" (USSR) 1989
- Parachutist Badge (USSR and RF)
- Medal "15 years since the Soviet withdrawal from Afghanistan" (CIS) 2004
- Order of Friendship (Democratic Republic of Afghanistan)
- Medal "From the Grateful Afghan People" (DRA) 1988

== See also ==
- List of Heroes of the Russian Federation
- Russian Airborne Troops
- Spetsnaz
- Soviet–Afghan War
- Second Chechen War
- 2008 South Ossetia war
