= 33rd Mechanized Brigade (Ukraine) =

Ukrainian Ground Forces unit

- 33-тя окрема механізована бригада
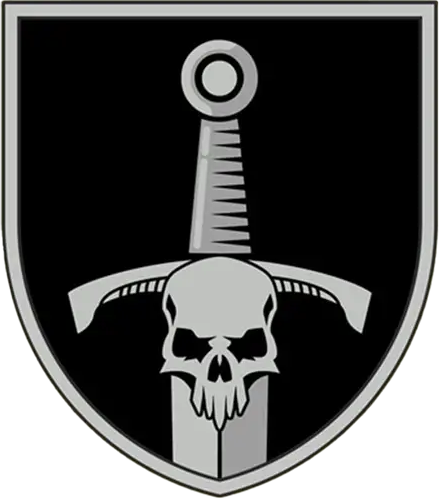
- Shoulder Sleeve Insignia
- Active: 1 April 2016–present
- Country: Ukraine
- Branch: Ukrainian Ground Forces
- Role: Mechanized Infantry
- Size: Brigade
- Motto: Forward to Victory
- Engagements: Russo-Ukrainian War Russian Invasion of Ukraine: 2023 Ukrainian counteroffensive; Battle of Mala Tokmachka
- Website: https://www.facebook.com/33OMBr

Commanders
- Current commander: Col. Dmytro Palisa
- Notable commanders: Col. Ivan Voitenko (until 2025)

Insignia
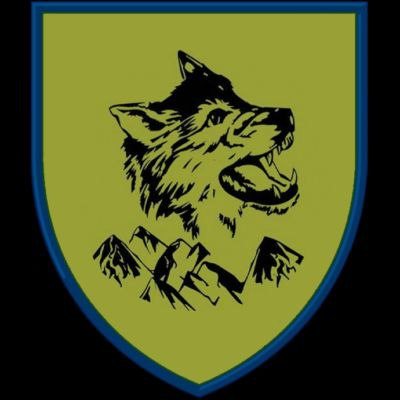
- Old sleeve patch of the 33rd Mechanized Brigade (Pre September 2023)

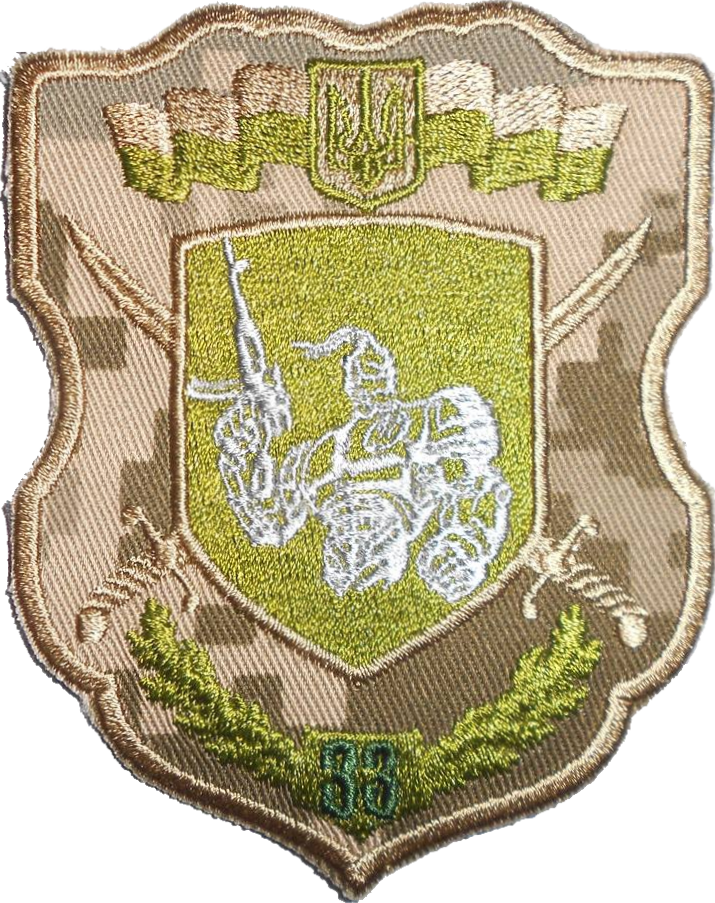
- Former sleeve insignia

The 33rd Mechanized Brigade (Ukrainian: 33-тя окрема механізована бригада) is a brigade of the Ukrainian Ground Forces formed in 2016.

== History ==
The 33rd Mechanized Brigade, which was originally formed in April 2016 as a part of the Ukrainian Reserve Corps, had been demobilized and essentially existed only on paper for a period of time. However, the brigade has been reactivated and is making a comeback. As a symbol of this reactivation, the unit has been given new insignia that features a wolf, which is said to represent the brigade. Later they received a new insignia that features a sword with a skull on it.

In August and September 2024, it was reported that the brigade was participating in combat on the Kurakhove front. The next month, the brigade's press officer said that it was positioned on a section of the front line between Heorhiivka and Vuhledar, where it was opposed by the Russian 255th Regiment.

As of November 2024, the brigade was operating in the vicinity of the village of Dalnie.

== Structure ==
As of 2023 the brigade's structure is as follows:

- 33rd Mechanized Brigade,
  - Headquarters & Headquarters Company
  - 1st Mechanized Battalion
  - 2nd Mechanized Battalion
  - 3rd Mechanized Battalion
  - Tank Battalion (Leopard 2A4)
  - Artillery Group
  - Anti-Aircraft Defense Battalion
  - Reconnaissance Company
  - "Sky Monsters" UAV Company. FPV drops and kamikaze drones.
  - Engineer Battalion
  - Logistic Battalion
  - Signal Company
  - Maintenance Battalion
  - Radar Company
  - Medical Company
  - Chemical, biological, radiological and nuclear (CBRN) Protection Company
