= Yuliia Shevchenko =

Ukrainian activist and soldier (1999–2023)

- Юлія Шевченко

Personal details
- Born: Yuliia Andriivna Shevchenko; 18 June 1999 Kyiv
- Died: 31 July 2023 (aged 24) Orikhiv, Zaporizhzhia Oblast

Military service
- Allegiance: Ukraine
- Branch/service: Armed Forces of Ukraine
- Rank: Lieutenant
- Battles/wars: Russo-Ukrainian War
- Awards: Order of Bohdan Khmelnytskyi

Yuliia Andriivna Shevchenko (Ukrainian: Юлія Андріївна Шевченко, 18 June 1999, — 31 July 2023) was a Ukrainian civic activist, poet, soldier, lieutenant of the 47th Mechanized Brigade of the Armed Forces of Ukraine, a participant in the Russian-Ukrainian war.

== Biography ==
Yuliia Shevchenko was born on 18 June 1999 in Kyiv, where she studied at Lyceum #241 (2016, with a silver medal).

She participated in the Revolution of Dignity and helped medics.

She graduated from the Military Department of the National Guard Military Academy of Ukraine (2020) and the Faculty of Prosecution of the Yaroslav Mudryi National Law University (2022, with honors, specialty "lawyer"). In the same year, she became a postgraduate student at the Department of Criminal Law at her alma mater.

In 2021, while studying in her 5th year, she won the Anti-Corruption Landing Project. Since then, she has worked in the department of mandatory full inspections of the National Agency on Corruption Prevention.

She also wrote poetry.

With the beginning of the large-scale Russian invasion of Ukraine in 2022, Yuliia voluntarily joined the Armed Forces of Ukraine. She served as the deputy commander for moral and psychological support of the 47th Mechanized Brigade.

She died on 31 July 2023 in Orikhiv, Zaporizhzhia Oblast.

The funeral took place at St Volodymyr's Cathedral. She was buried on 5 August 2023 in her hometown.

She is survived by her parents and her fiancé Taras.

== Awards ==
- Order of Bohdan Khmelnytskyi, 3rd class (24 August 2023, posthumously)
