= Davyd Zhvania =

Ukrainian politician (1967–2022)

- Давид Жванія
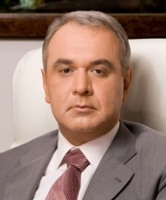

People's Deputy of Ukraine
- In office 31 March 2002 – 27 November 2014

Emergency Minister of Ukraine
- In office 4 February 2005 – 27 September 2005
- President: Viktor Yushchenko
- Prime Minister: Yulia Tymoshenko
- Preceded by: Hryhoriy Reva
- Succeeded by: Viktor Baloha

Personal details
- Born: 20 July 1967 Tbilisi, Georgian SSR, Soviet Union
- Died: 9 May 2022 (aged 54) Novopokrovka, Ukraine
- Party: Party of Regions (2013); Christian Democratic Union (2010–2012); Our Ukraine–People's Self-Defense Bloc (2002–2007, 2007–2010)
- Education: Tbilisi State University

Davyd Vazhayevych Zhvania (Ukrainian: Давид Важаєвич Жванія; Georgian: დავით ვაჟას ძე ჟვანია; 20 July 1967 – 9 May 2022) was a Ukrainian politician who served as the Emergency Minister of Ukraine and as a People's Deputy of the Verkhovna Rada (Ukrainian's national parliament) from 2002 to 2010 for the pro-European Our Ukraine Bloc and from 2012 to 2014 for the pro-Russian Party of Regions.

== Biography ==
Zhvania was born on 20 July 1967 in Tbilisi, Georgian SSR, then part of the USSR.

From 1986 to 1988 he served in the Soviet Border Troops. In 1991 he graduated from the Faculty of National Economy Planning of the Tbilisi State University. During the reign of Zviad Gamsakhurdia, he left Georgia. He came to Ukraine in 1991, and became a citizen in 1999.

In the 2002 Ukrainian parliamentary election Zhvania was elected to parliament for the Bloc of Viktor Yushchenko "Our Ukraine" political coalition.

Following the Orange Revolution, that followed the 2004 Ukrainian presidential election that elected Viktor Yushchenko as president, Zhvania became Emergencies Minister in Yulia Tymoshenko's government.

In the 2006 parliamentary election Zhvania was reelected for this same coalition that was by then named Our Ukraine Bloc. The next year he achieved the same, but this time his political alliance was named Our Ukraine — People's Self-Defense.

In July 2008, Yushchenko accused Zhvania, the godfather of one of his children, of involvement in his dioxin poisoning during the Ukrainian presidential election campaign in September 2004. Yushchenko did not provide evidence for his claim.

In 2010, Zhvania was one of the founders of the People’s Self-Defense party. In July of that same year he joined the party Christian Democratic Union.

Zhvania took part in the 2012 Ukrainian parliamentary election as an independent candidate in single-member districts number 140 (first-past-the-post wins a parliament seat) located in the town Illichivsk. He was (re-)elected in parliament after winning the district with 37.02% of the vote. In parliament Zhvania in December 2012 he joined the Party of Regions faction.

In the 2014 Ukrainian parliamentary election Zhvania, this time as a candidate for Petro Poroshenko Bloc, failed to get reelected in constituency number 140. He finished third with 9.49% of the votes.

Zhvania died on 9 May 2022 in shelling near the village of Novopokrovka, Polohy Raion, Zaporizhzhia Oblast, during the Russian invasion of Ukraine.
