= Mala Tokmachka rural hromada =

Mala Tokmachka rural hromada Малотокмачанська селищна громада
- Hromada
- Interactive map of Mala Tokmachka rural hromada
- Country: Ukraine
- Oblast: Zaporizhzhia
- Raion: Polohy

Area
  - Total: 174.3 km^{2} (67.3 sq mi)

Population (2020)
  - Total: 2,997
  - Density: 17.19/km^{2} (44.53/sq mi)
- Settlements: 4
- Villages: 4

Mala Tokmachka rural hromada (Ukrainian: Малотокмачанська селищна громада) is a hromada of Ukraine, located in Polohy Raion, Zaporizhzhia Oblast. Its administrative center is the village of Mala Tokmachka.

It has an area of 174.3 square kilometres (67.3 mi^{2}) and a population of 2,997, as of 2020.

The hromada contains 4 settlements, which are all villages:

- Bilohiria
- Luhivske
- Mala Tokmachka
- Novopokrovka

== See also ==
- List of hromadas of Ukraine
