= Nikolai Maydanov =

Kairbolat "Nikolai" Maydonov
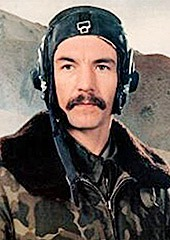
- Native name: Қайырболат Сайынұлы Майданов
- Born: 7 February 1956; Syrym District, Kazakh SSR, USSR
- Died: 29 January 2000 (aged 43) Argun Gorge, Chechnya, Russia
- Allegiance: Soviet Union; Kazakhstan; Russia
- Branch: Aviation
- Rank: Colonel
- Conflicts: Soviet–Afghan War; Second Chechen War; Dagestan War
- Awards: Hero of the Soviet Union; Hero of the Russian Federation

Kairbolat "Nikolai" Sainovich Madyonov (Kazakh: Қайырболат Сайынұлы Майданов, romanized: Qaýırbolat Saýınulı Maýdanov, Russian: Николай Саинович Майданов; 7 February 1956 – 29 January 2000) was a Kazakh helicopter pilot. He was one of only four people to be awarded both the title Hero of the Soviet Union and Hero of the Russian Federation. He fought in the Soviet–Afghan War and later in the Second Chechen War, where he was mortally wounded when his helicopter was ambushed by Chechen rebels while he was evacuating Russian soldiers from the Argun Gorge.

== Early life ==
Kairbolat Sainovich Madyonov was born on 7 February 1956 in Tashuduk village, Kazakh SSR, USSR to a Kazakh father and German mother. His birth name was Kairbolat, but he is often called the Russian name Nikolai. He applied to the Aktobe School of Civil Aviation, but he decided not to attend after his friend's application was rejected, so he joined the DOSAAF instead. A year later he was sent to Germany and worked as the driver of his regiment commander. In 1976 he entered the Saratov Military Aviation School of Pilots, and graduated in 1980 as a helicopter pilot.

== Soviet–Afghan War ==
Madyonov was sent on his first deployment to Afghanistan in 1984 and returned home in December 1985. He volunteered to deploy to Afghanistan again in March 1987 to protect less experienced pilots from being sent. He became famous for a flight in May 1987 when he defied orders to return so he could evacuate other soldiers, for which he was briefly suspended but then awarded the Order of the Red Banner. He also went on ground-attack missions against enemy caravans. In July 1988 he led a search party of Mi-8s and ten Mi-24s to locate a group of two Mi-8 helicopters that were shot down. He was awarded the title Hero of the Soviet Union on 29 July 1988 for his deployment in Afghanistan. He totaled 1,250 sorties and 1,100 flight hours.

== Second Chechen War ==
In 1992, Madyonov graduated from the Gagarin Air Force Academy and continued piloting helicopters. For some time he served in the Armed Forces of the Republic of Kazakhstan, but later moved to Russia and served in the Russian Armed Forces. He was offered a desk job in headquarters in 1998, but insisted on going to the North Caucasus where he flew in counter-terrorist operations in Chechnya and Dagestan. He received the Medal of Suvorov for his deployment in the Caucasus. A one million dollar bounty was placed on his head.

Madyonov was killed while piloting his helicopter in the Argun Gorge on 29 January 2000 while he was evacuating paratroopers from an ambush. A sniper fired at his helicopter, and a bullet ricocheted off of his instruments into his chest and struck his neck with shrapnel. He bled to death before landing and his co-pilot took over. He was posthumously awarded the title Hero of the Russian Federation.
