= Novopokrovka, Polohy Raion, Zaporizhzhia Oblast =

Novopokrovka Новопокровка
- Village
- Location of Novopokrovka in Zaporizhzhia Oblast Novopokrovka (Ukraine)
- Coordinates: 47°30′20″N 35°59′06″E
- Country: Ukraine
- Oblast: Zaporizhzhia Oblast
- District: Polohy Raion
- Hromada: Mala Tokmachka rural hromada
- Founded: 1922

Area
  - Total: 1.09 km^{2} (0.42 sq mi)
- Elevation: 68 m (223 ft)

Population (2001)
  - Total: 314
  - Density: 288/km^{2} (746/sq mi)
- Time zone: UTC+2 (EET)
  - Summer (DST): UTC+3 (EEST)
- Postal code: 70552
- Area code: +380 6141
- Climate: Dfa

Novopokrovka (Ukrainian: Новопокровка) is a village (a selo) in the Polohy Raion (district) of Zaporizhzhia Oblast in southern Ukraine.

Until 18 July 2020, Novopokrovka belonged to Orikhiv Raion. The raion was abolished that day as part of the administrative reform of Ukraine, which reduced the number of raions of Zaporizhzhia Oblast to five. The area of Orikhiv Raion was merged into Polohy Raion.

Davyd Zhvania, a member of the Ukrainian Parliament, died on 9 May 2022 in shelling near the village, during the Russian invasion of Ukraine. On 27 October 2022, the village was occupied by Russian forces.
