= Suomen Sotilas =

Weekly military magazine in Finland

- Categories: Military magazine
- Frequency: 10 times a year
- Founded: 1919
- Country: Finland
- Based in: Helsinki
- Language: Finnish
- ISSN: 1237-8704

Suomen Sotilas (Finnish: Finland’s Soldier) is a Finnish-language military magazine published in Helsinki, Finland. Founded in 1919, it is one of the oldest publications in the country.

== History and profile ==
Suomen Sotilas was established in 1919. The magazine is headquartered in Helsinki. It was initially published weekly and featured articles on morality, military virtues and the risks of adopting a Bolshevik approach. Later the scope of the magazine was expanded. It mostly covers articles about Finnish security policy, security strategy, the art of warfare and military technology.

In its first year Suomen Sotilas sold 4,000 copies. By 1920 the circulation rose to over 12,000 copies.
