= Oleksandr Sak =

Ukrainian soldier

- Олександр Сак
- Born: Олександр Олександрович Сак; 1994 (age 31–32)
- Alma mater: Hetman Petro Sahaidachnyi National Army Academy
- Military career
- Allegiance: Ukraine
- Branch: Armed Forces of Ukraine
- Rank: Lieutenant colonel
- Nickname: Staff (Стафф)
- Units: 47th Mechanized Brigade (2022-2023); 53rd Mechanized Brigade (2024-Present)
- Conflicts: Russo-Ukrainian War
- Awards: Order of Bohdan Khmelnytskyi

Oleksandr Oleksandrovych Sak (Ukrainian: Олександр Олександрович Сак) is a Ukrainian soldier, lieutenant colonel, and the former commander of the 47th Mechanized Brigade of the Armed Forces of Ukraine until 16 September 2023 when he was replaced by Colonel Oleksandr Pavlii.

In 2023, he was included in Forbes 30 Under 30: Creators of the Future rating.

== Biography ==
Graduated from the Zakarpattia Regional Boarding Lyceum with enhanced military and physical training, Faculty of Combat Use of Troops of the Hetman Petro Sahaidachnyi National Army Academy (2015).

After graduation, he began his service in the 93rd Mechanized Brigade "Kholodnyi Yar".

Participated in combat in the ATO/JFO area. In the summer of 2015, he became a company commander, and in 2019 — the commander of the 3rd Battalion. He was wounded three times.

During the full-scale Russian invasion, he was the commander of a mechanized battalion that engaged in combat with the enemy's battalion tactical group and won thanks to a rational approach to combat and non-standard tactics.

In 2022, he was appointed commander of the newly created 47th Mechanized Brigade.

On 16 September 2023, he was sacked and replaced Colonel Oleksandr Pavlii who had previously commanded the 112th Separate Brigade of the Territorial Defence Forces of the city of Kyiv since 2022.

On 25 November 2024, he was appointed as the new commander of the 53rd Mechanized Brigade.

On 15 May 2025, he was appointed as the commander of the 59th Assault Brigade.

== Awards ==
- Order of Bohdan Khmelnytskyi, 1st class (8 August 2022)
- Order of Bohdan Khmelnytskyi, 2nd class (7 March 2022)
- Order of Bohdan Khmelnytskyi, 3rd class (4 February 2016)
- Order of the People's Hero of Ukraine
- Medal "Defender of the Fatherland" (27 October 2016)
