= 47th Mechanized Brigade =

Ukrainian Ground Forces formation

47th Mechanized Brigade "Magura"
- 47-ма окрема механізована бригада
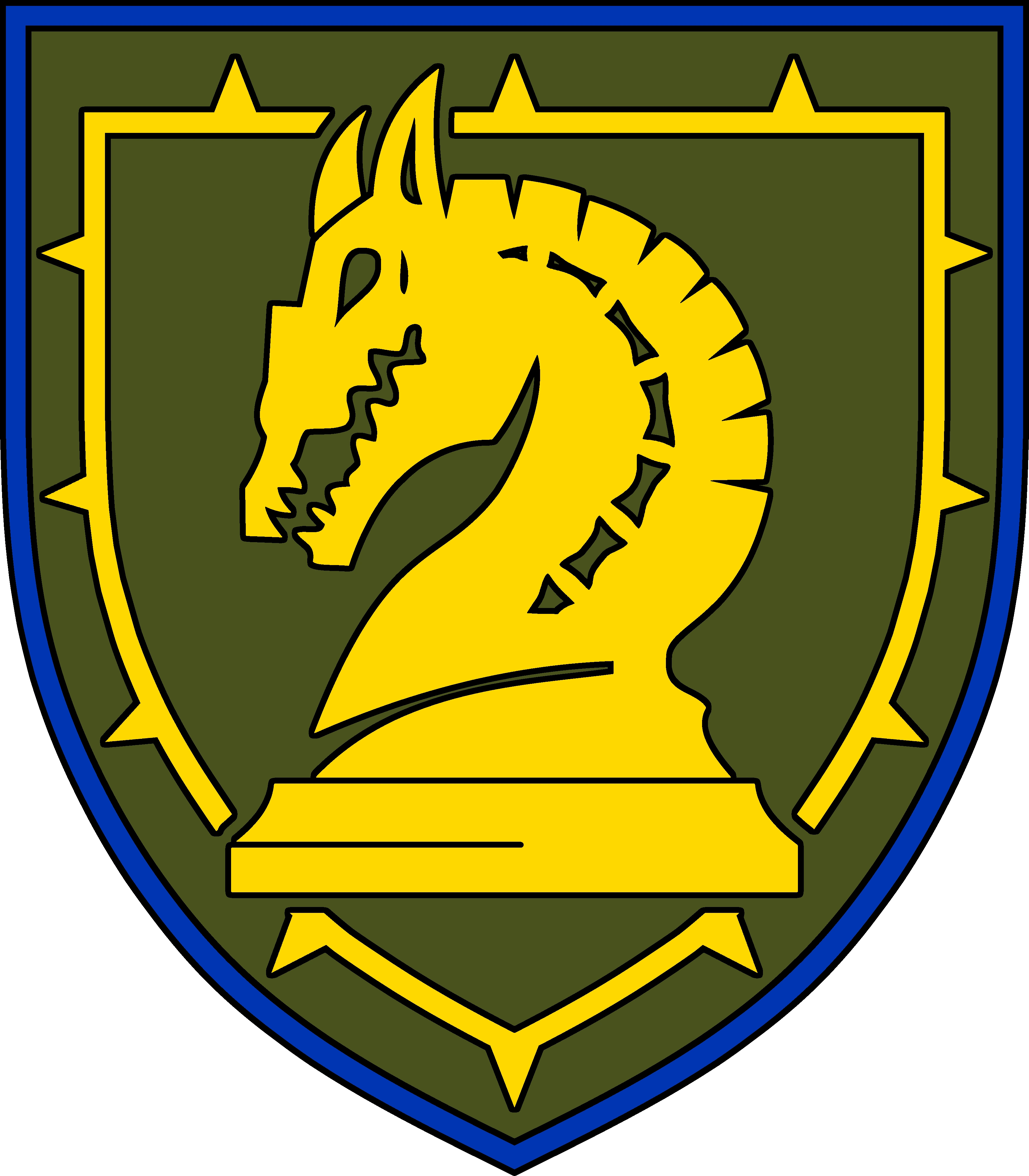
- Shoulder Sleeve Insignia
- Active: April 26, 2022 – present
- Country: Ukraine
- Branch: Ukrainian Ground Forces
- Role: Mechanized Infantry
- Part of: Operational Command North; 9th Army Corps
- Equipment: M2A2 ODS, M1A1 SA, M109A6 Paladin, D-30
- Engagements: Russo-Ukrainian War; Battle of Bakhmut; 2023 Ukrainian counteroffensive Battle of Mala Tokmachka; Battle of Avdiivka; Battle of Ocheretyne
- Website: https://choko.link/47th_Brigade

Commanders
- Current commander: Col. Maxim Oleksandrovitch Daniiltchuk
- Notable commanders: Lt. Col. Oleksandr Sak (2022 - September 2023); Col. Oleksandr Pavlii (September 2023 - January 2024); Lt. Col. Dmytro Ryumshin (January 2024 - March 2024)

Insignia
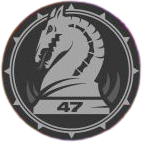
- Former sleeve patch

The 47th Mechanized Brigade "Magura" (Ukrainian: 47-ма окрема механізована бригада) is a brigade of the Ukrainian Ground Forces formed in 2022.

== History ==
The unit was formed during the Russo-Ukrainian War. The unit was originally called the 47th Assault Battalion, and was created under the leadership of Captain Ivan Shalamaga, who at the time held the position of deputy commander in the 30th Mechanized Brigade; and reconnaissance officer Valery Markus. After its official establishment on April 26, the battalion underwent training before being deployed to the Vuhlehirskaya area near Bakhmut, participating in the battle of Bakhmut.

The battalion's success was recognized by the Commander-in-Chief of the Ukrainian Armed Forces. Valery Zaluzhny, who ordered its expansion into a full assault regiment. Within three months, the 47th Assault Battalion was reorganized into the 47th Assault Brigade, which was then led by Oleksandr Sak as its commander, with Shalamaga as his deputy.

General Zaluzhny appointed Oleksandr Sak as the brigade commander. The brigade underwent combat training in various locations throughout Ukraine and Europe and members of the brigade trained on vehicles at a U.S. base. The brigade saw a significant increase in personnel, from roughly 400 in April to around 2,000 in January 2023. The 47th Mechanized Brigade was formed from the 47th Assault Battalion, which was established with volunteers from Kyiv, Dnipro, Odesa, and Lviv. The head master sergeant of the battalion was Valeriy Markus.

The battalion was quickly equipped and ready for action, participating in a battle for the Vuhlehirska power station in the Donetsk region by May 8, 2022. On June 28, 2022, the battalion was expanded to an assault regiment with the addition of tank, artillery, and fire support units. The regiment underwent restructuring from October 13 to November 15, 2022, to become the 47th Mechanized Brigade, which is now equipped with M-55S, Panthera T6, BMP-1, Leopard 2 and M2A2 ODS Bradleys.

=== 2023 counteroffensive ===
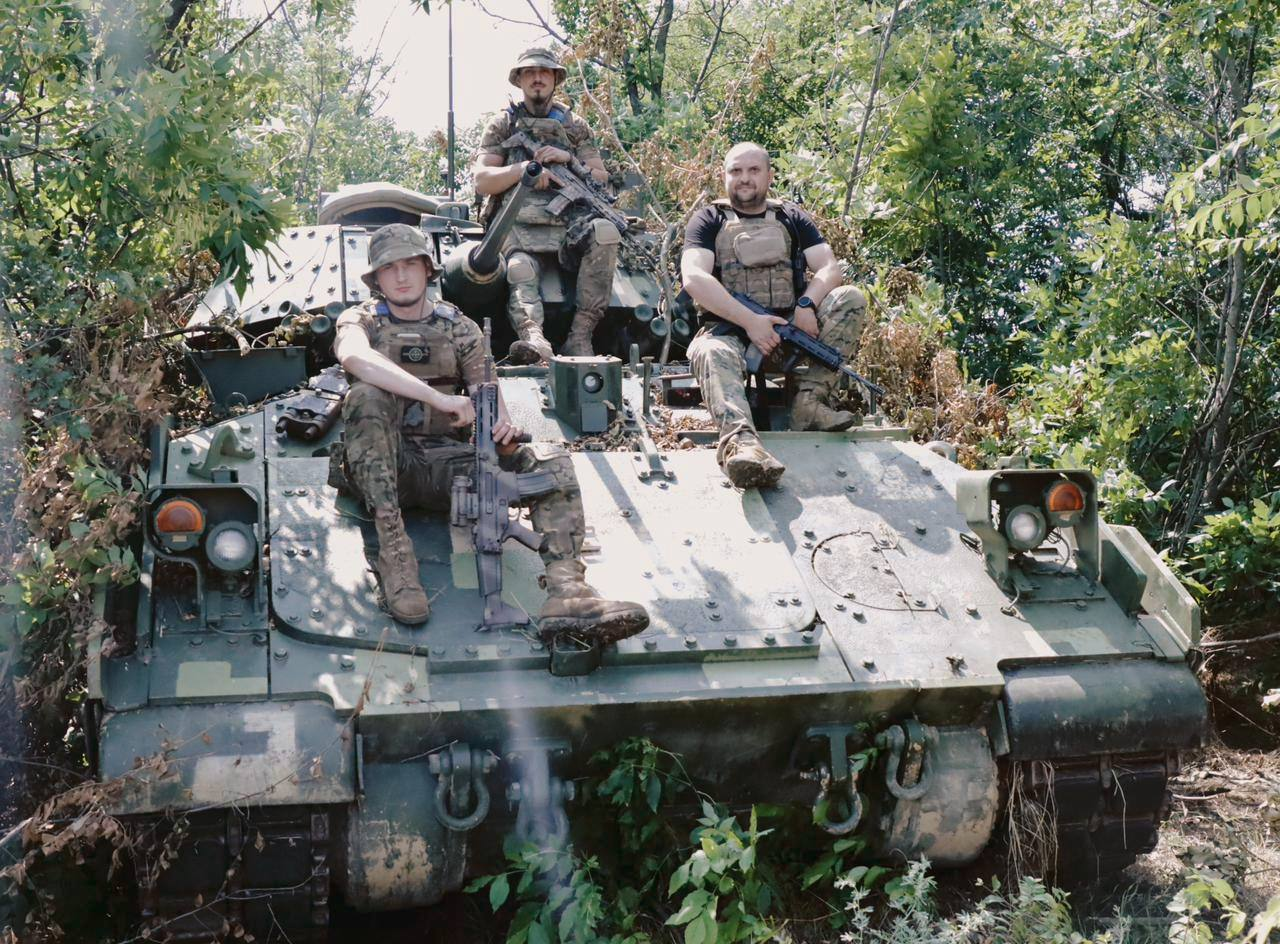
Bradley infantry fighting vehicle of the 47th Mechanized Brigade in July 2023

On June 8, 2023, the 47th Mechanized Brigade engaged in the 2023 Ukrainian counteroffensive and suffered heavy material losses. On July 11, 2023, headmaster sergeant Valerii Markus, who had met with the President of Ukraine Volodymyr Zelenskyy at the end of June, complained about the decisions of the unit's command regarding lack of interest in soldiers morale and officers incompetence.

Intense clashes occurred near the hamlet of Robotyne, as it held a vital position in the Russian defensive front. The village endured significant damage and population loss throughout the battles. The 47th Mechanized Brigade was the first Ukrainian unit to enter the village on July 22, 2023. On 22 July 2023 Dimytro Rybakov Commander of the 47th Mechanized Brigade was killed in combat in direction of Melitopol axis. Rybakov was also a well known journalist and Economic commentator.

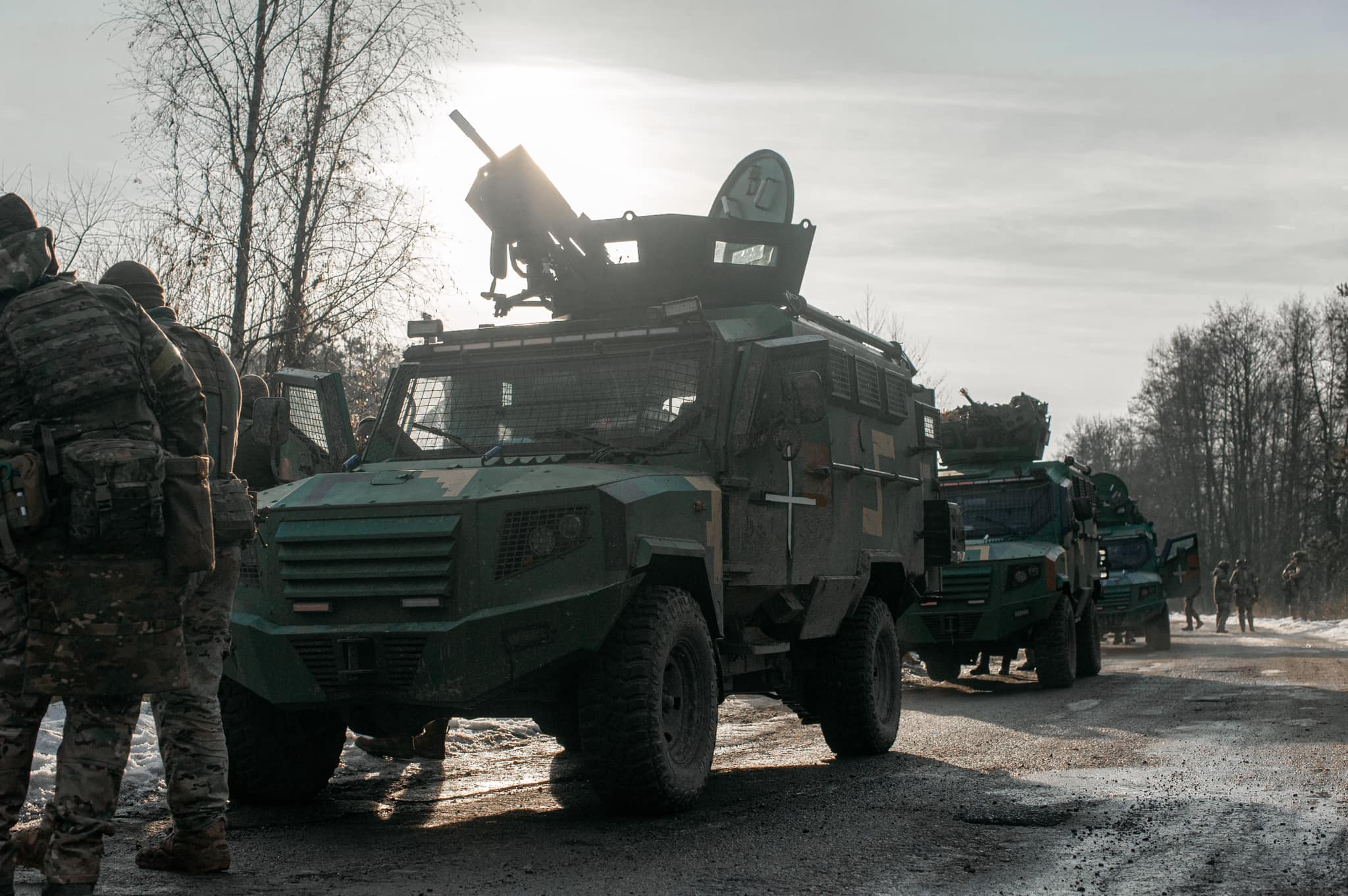
47th Brigade Panthera T6

In late July, the BBC visited the 47th Mechanized Brigade, which was fighting in "southern Ukraine". General Oleksandr Tarnavskyi said that the number of minefields meant that the advance must be undertaken by soldiers and not armored units. A repair workshop had a dozen vehicles being repaired, mostly M2 Bradleys. The BBC team also traveled around the southern front and saw Mastiff armored vehicles, supplied by Britain, damaged and destroyed. The 47th has used its older Soviet-era equipment, such as the T-64 tank to clear minefields. These tanks are fitted with rollers to try and detonate landmines. However, Russian mines are being stacked on top of each other. One T-64 commander said that a roller was destroyed after one explosion when typically it could withstand four explosions. Russian forces had started to leave trenches abandoned but filled with remote-controlled mines. Once Ukrainian forces entered the trench, there was an immediate explosion.

On August 17, 2023, near Robotyne, one of the members of the brigade used a Swedish RBS-70 MANPAD to shoot down a Russian Ka-52 Alligator helicopter, reportedly killing one of the crew members. It was the first visible confirmation of Ukraine employing this system in combat. After a month of intense fighting, on August 23, 2023, they unfurled the Ukrainian flag on the ruins of a local school, marking the capture of Robotyne and subsequently organized the evacuation of the remaining civilians.

As of September 2023, the brigade had suffered around 2,000 casualties out of its initial complement of 5,000.

On 16 September 2023, Lieutenant Colonel Oleksandr Sak was removed from command and replaced by Colonel Oleksandr Pavlii.

=== Avdiivka ===
Around mid-October 2023, the brigade was pulled from the southern front and transferred to reinforce the defense against Russian forces in the battle of Avdiivka.

The following month, the unit was visited by Spanish newspaper El País. At the time, it was defending the railway lines north of Avdiivka to avoid the encirclement of the city. Casualties were said to be high on both sides, with, reportedly, one Ukrainian casualty for three Russian. A platoon leader reporting 17 killed and missing in action. The same officer also claimed that his Russian opponents were "superior in everything except in training". The commander of a Paladin howitzer complained that he could only shoot 15 shells per day, compared with 100 to 150 per day during the summer counteroffensive, and that his gun's error margin had grown from 7 to 70 meters due to wear. A squad leader declared having lost all his 17 men while another company lost 65 out of a total of 80 soldiers, with casualties are claimed to be comparable to those of the Russians.

On December 28, near Stepove, in repelling an attack by a Russian reinforced battalion of 500 troops, the brigade allegedly killed half of them and destroyed 21 enemy tanks and 14 IFV/APCs. Reportedly, the brigade lost only two tanks abandoned in return. Colonel Pavili was dismissed the following month, and replaced by Lt. Col. Dmitro Riumshin.

On February 23, 2024, the brigade published a video that showed, for the first time, an M1A1 Abrams in combat operation in Ukraine. Two days later, the Russians published a video of the first-ever M1A1 Abrams destroyed in Ukraine. By April 20, five of the brigade's 31 Abrams had been destroyed and three others moderately damaged, mainly by first-person-view drones.

Ukrainian commander-in-chief Syrskyi publicly praised the 47th Brigade in March 2024 for its efforts in repelling Russian attacks on the villages of Berdychi and Orlivka. On March 10, 2024, the commander of the brigade, Ryumshin, was replaced by Col. Yan Yatsishen. The latter is the fourth commander so far.

El País on April 22, 2024 reported the brigade was in dire straits due to ammunition and equipment shortages; in one company, for instance, there remained only two Bradley vehicles in operation out of its initial eleven.

Around April 20, the brigade was pulled back from the front line east of Ocheretyne to rest and resupply. However, coordination with the replacing unit, the 115th Mechanized Brigade, failed and the Russian 30th Motor Rifle Brigade took advantage of the opportunity to advance swiftly on Ocheretyne. The 47th was sent back to the fight, could not avoid the fall of the town but prevented the Russians from widening the salient. Forbes reported the brigade was 2,000 strong at the time and had lost at least 40 of its roughly 200 M2 IFV and five of its 31 M1A1 tanks.

On May 28, the brigade repelled a Russian attack near Novopokrovske. On June 26, the brigade was commended by the General Staff for "bravely hold[ing] their positions" at an unspecified location.

On July 7, the unit was reported by Spanish analysts to be back to the Avdiivka sector.

On August 31, Forbes reported that the brigade had lost around half of the 31 M1 Abrams it had in operation six months earlier. For the entire summer it had been defending the front between Avdiivka and Pokrovsk, trying to slow down the Russian offensive.

=== Kursk ===
After a short respite after its service in the Avdiivka–Pokrovsk area, the entirety of the 47th Brigade was redeployed to Russia's Kursk Oblast in late September 2024, as part of the Ukrainian operation in the region. By mid-October, it was reported that the brigade was operating near the village of Zelyonyy Shlyakh, on the left flank of the group of Ukrainian forces in Kursk.

It was reported in late October 2024 that units of the brigade, including its 130th Mechanized Battalion, had conducted a new breakthrough along the Russia-Ukraine border at the village of Novyy Put in the Glushkovo District of the Kursk Oblast, and had seized Russian positions.

As of January 2025, units of the 47th Brigade were reportedly defending the village of Nikolskii along with units of the 82nd Air Assault Brigade, as part of Ukraine's operation in Russia's Kursk Oblast. During the next month, the brigade was still operating near Nikolskii.

On May 17, the unit's battalion commander, Oleksandr Shyrshyn, resigned from his post, criticizing the command for "stupid objectives" and unnecessary casualties. According to Ukrainian journalist Yuri Butusov, the resignation was due to poorly organized assaults on the village of Tyotkino.

In September 2025, 26-year-old Maxim Oleksandrovitch Daniiltchuk was appointed as commander of the brigade.

== Equipment ==
The brigade is armed with M2A2 ODS IFV (99 units), M109A6 Paladin SPH (18 units) and D-30 howitzers. It was supposed to be armed with M-55S (28 units) tanks, yet later they were replaced with Leopard 2A6 (21 unit) tanks. The brigade now operates the M1A1SA Abrams tank.

== Structure ==
As of 2024, the brigade's structure is as follows:

- 47th Mechanized Brigade
  - Headquarters & Headquarters Company
  - 1st Mechanized Infantry Battalion (M2 Bradley)
    - Aerial Reconnaissance Unit "God's Cause" (Божа Справа)
  - 2nd Mechanized Infantry Battalion
    - Attack Drone Unit "Ignis Vindicta"
  - 3rd Mechanized Infantry Battalion
  - 47th Tank Battalion (the 2 companies of m55s were switched with Leopard 2, which in turn were replaced by the M1 Abrams)
  - 25th Separate Assault Battalion
    - Aerial Reconnaissance Unit "Search and Destroy"
  - 26th Separate Rifle Battalion
  - Field Artillery Regiment
    - Regimental Headquarters and Target Acquisition Battery
    - Observer Battery
    - 1st Self-Propelled Artillery Battalion (M109 howitzer)
    - 2nd Artillery Battalion (122 mm howitzer 2A18 (D-30))
    - Rocket Artillery Battalion (BM-21 Grad)
    - Anti-Tank Artillery Battalion (Mixed)
  - Anti-Aircraft Missile Defense Battalion
  - Unmanned Systems Battalion "Strike Drone Company"
  - Reconnaissance Company
  - Combat Engineer Battalion
  - Maintenance Battalion
  - Logistic Battalion
  - Signal Company
  - Radar Company
  - Medical Company
  - Chemical, Biological, Radiological and Nuclear Defense Company
  - Brigade Band

== Commanders and notable military officers ==
- Lieutenant Colonel Oleksandr Sak
- Colonel Oleksandr Pavlii
- Sergeant Major Valeriy Markus
- Sergeant Major Vitaliy Averin

== See also ==
- Yuliia Shevchenko (activist)
