= Heorhiivka =

Heorhiivka (Ukrainian: Георгіївка) may refer to several places in Ukraine:

- Heorhiivka, Cherkasy Oblast
- Heorhiivka, Crimea
- Heorhiivka, Dnipropetrovsk Oblast
- Heorhiivka, Pokrovsk Raion, Donetsk Oblast
- Heorhiivka, Volnovakha Raion, Donetsk Oblast
- Heorhiivka, Kherson Oblast
- Heorhiivka, Luhansk Oblast
- Heorhiivka, Zaporizhzhia Oblast
