= Levadne, Zaporizhzhia Oblast =

Village in Zaporizhzhia Oblast, Ukraine

Levadne Левадне
- Village
- Interactive map of Levadne
- Location within Zaporizhzhia Oblast Location within Ukraine
- Coordinates: 47°44′38″N 36°35′48″E
- Country: Ukraine
- Oblast: Zaporizhzhia Oblast
- Raion: Polohy Raion
- Hromada: Malynivka rural hromada
- Founded: Before 1985

Area
  - Total: 0.657 km^{2} (0.254 sq mi)
- Elevation: 140 m (460 ft)

Population (2001 census)
  - Total: 1
  - Density: 1.5/km^{2} (3.9/sq mi)
- Time zone: UTC+2 (EET)
  - Summer (DST): UTC+3 (EEST)
- Postal code: 70241
- Area code: +380 6145
- KOATUU code: 2321886002
- KATOTTH code: UA23100110030060496

Levadne (Ukrainian: Левадне) is a village in Polohy Raion, Zaporizhzhia Oblast, Ukraine.

Early in the Russian invasion of Ukraine in 2022, the settlement was captured by Russian Armed Forces. The town was later retaken by Ukrainian forces on 11 June 2023 during the 2023 Ukrainian counteroffensive. More than a year later on 13 October 2024, however, the village returned to Russian control after elements of the Russian 336th Guards Naval Infantry Brigade and 394th Motorized Rifle Regiment penetrated the frontlines.

== Geography ==
The village is located approximately 2.5 km (1.6 mi) from the Solona tributary, and about 5 km (3.1 mi) from the nearest settlement Pryiutne.

== History ==
According to old Soviet-era maps dated between 1932 and 1941, the settlement formerly was referred to as Oktoberfeld, but it is unclear when the change to its current name took place.

According to the 1989 Ukrainian SSR census, the village had a population of 19, consisting of fourteen women and five men. In the 2001 census, the settlement's population would drop to only one person, who spoke Ukrainian.

=== Russo-Ukrainian War ===
On 12 June 2020; Decree No. 713 of the Cabinet of Ministers of Ukraine placed the village in the administration of the Malynivka rural hromada, and on 17 July became part of the expanded Polohy Raion, as a result of administrative-territorial reform which abolished the Huliaipole Raion.

==== Russian invasion of Ukraine ====
At the beginning of the Russian invasion of Ukraine, Levadne was occupied by Russian troops in their initial advance into Ukraine. The settlement would remain under Russian occupation for over a year, until 5 June 2023, when Ukrainian forces made the first attempt to retake positions near the settlement. About one week later on 11 June, during the initial days of their summer counteroffensive of that year, Ukrainian forces successfully regained control of the settlement. The recapture was confirmed a day later by Ukrainian Deputy Minister of Defense Hanna Maliar on the messaging app Telegram. The settlement was later used for further advances by the Ukrainian military in the local area, along the aptly named "Levadne-Staromaiorske line" and "Levadne-Pryiutne line". On 12 and 13 October 2024, elements of the Russian 336th Guards Naval Infantry Brigade and 394th Motorized Rifle Regiment (part of the 127th Motor Rifle Division) entered the outskirts of the village, with claims by Russian milbloggers the village was captured in full shortly after.

== See also ==
List of nearby settlements

- Novodarivka
- Stepove
- Pryiutne
- Olhivske
