= Malynivka, Polohy Raion, Zaporizhzhia Oblast =

Malynivka Мали́нівка
- Village
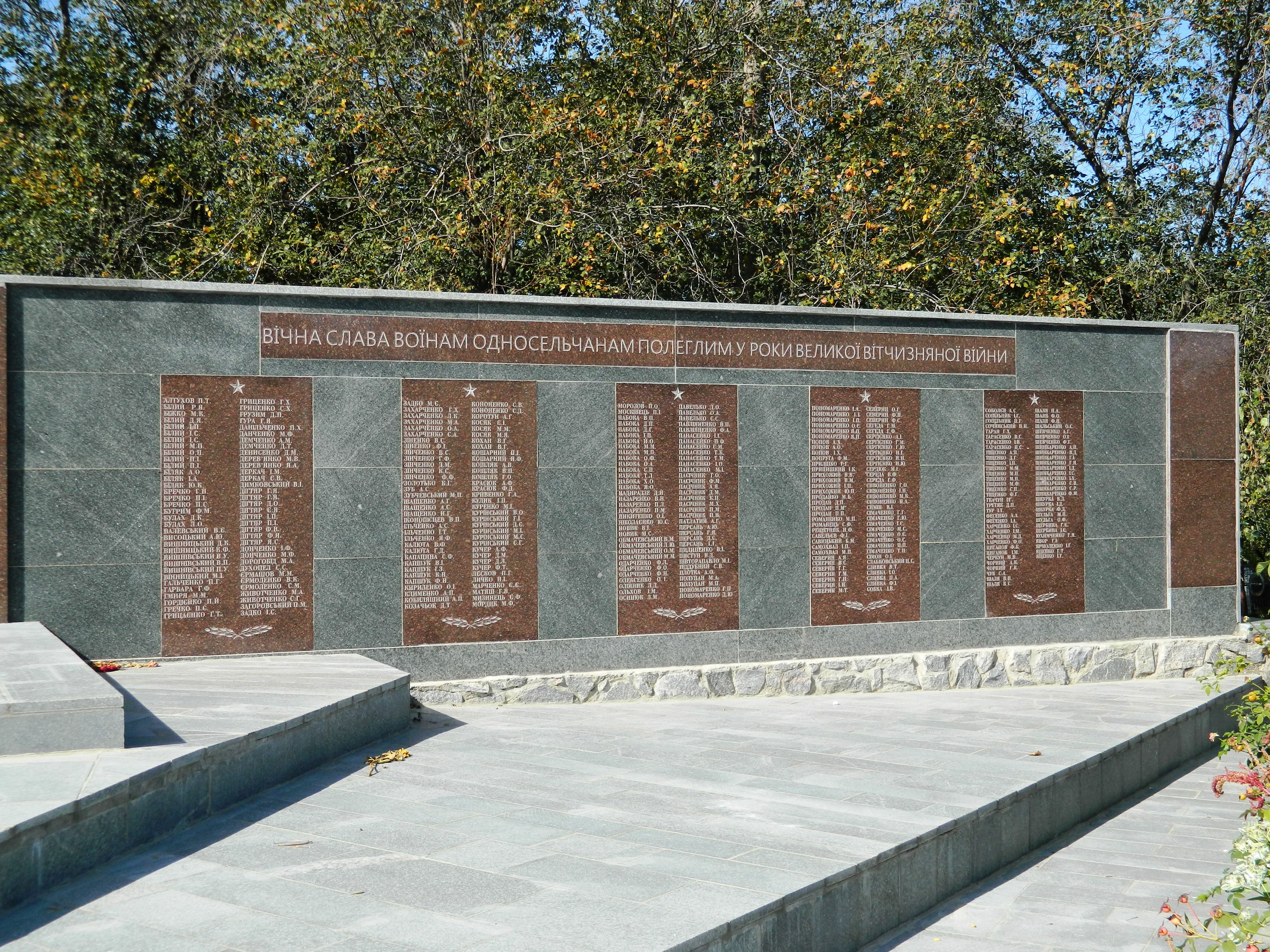
- The monument to fallen soldiers from World War II in the village
- Interactive map of Malynivka
- Location of Malynivka within Zaporizhzhia Oblast Malynivka (Ukraine)
- Coordinates: 47°40′36″N 36°28′26″E
- Country: Ukraine
- Oblast: Zaporizhzhia Oblast
- Raion: Polohy Raion
- Hromada: Malynivka rural hromada

Population (2025)
  - Total: 1

Malynivka (Ukrainian: Мали́нівка), known as Turkenivka (Ukrainian: Туркенівка) before 1946, is a village (selo) in southern Ukraine. It is the center of Malynivka rural hromada (community), in Polohy Raion, Zaporizhzhia Oblast. It had a population of 873 in 2001. Malynivka was briefly captured by Russia in 2022. Russia recaptured the village in 2025.

== History ==
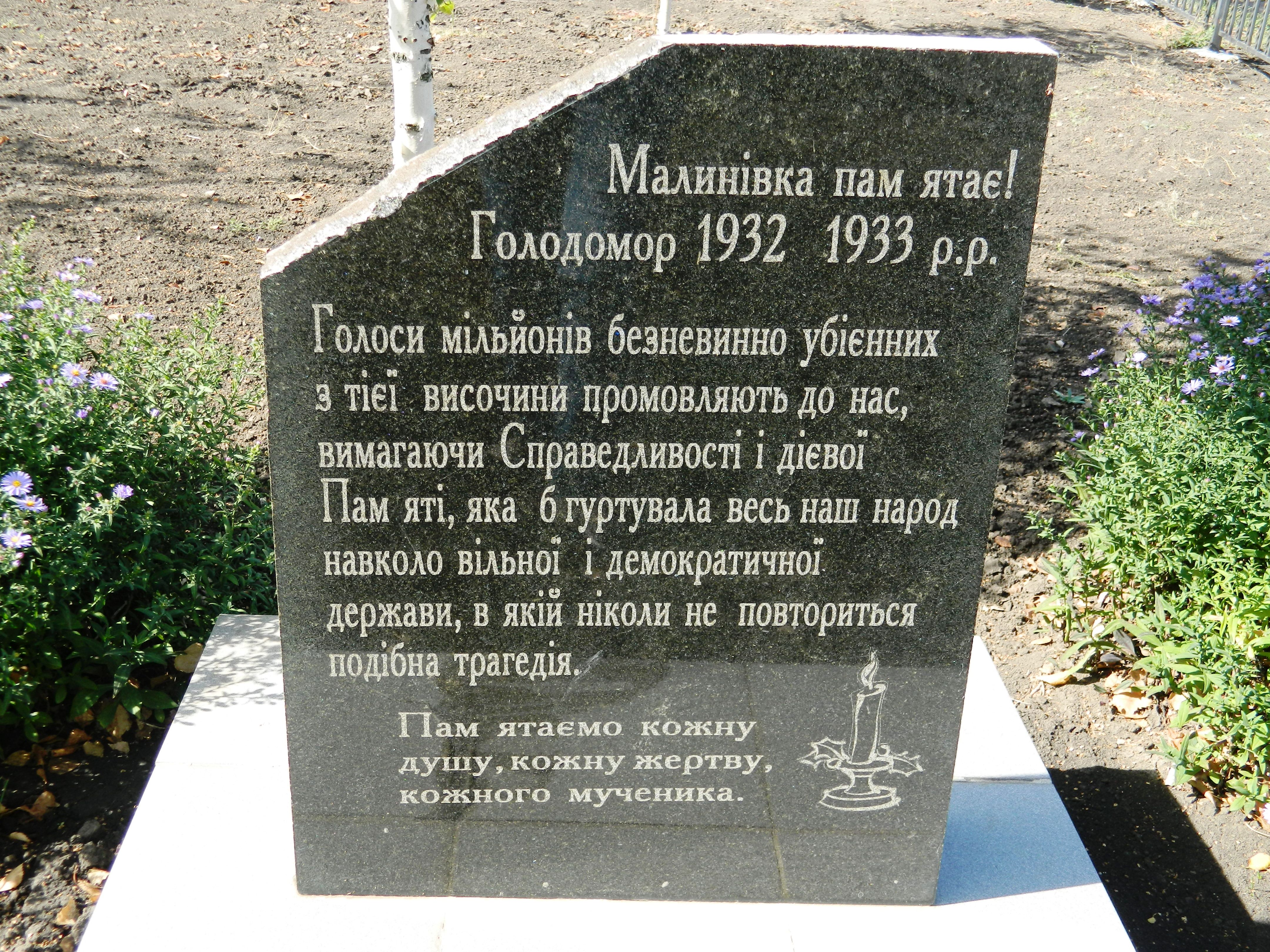
Memorial to Holodomor victims of the village

Due to the Holodomor, a manmade famine in Soviet Ukraine between 1932 and 1933, 160 residents of the village died.

On 12 June 2020, in accordance with a decree from the Ukrainian parliament, the Verkhovna Rada, Malynivka became the administrative center of the eponymous Malynivka rural hromada. On 17 July the same year, as a result of country-wide administrative decentralization reforms in Ukraine in which Huliaipole Raion was abolished, the village became part of Polohy Raion.

=== Russian invasion of Ukraine ===
On 5 March 2022, during the Russian invasion of Ukraine, the village briefly fell under Russian occupation. On 22 March the same year, the village was recaptured by the Armed Forces of Ukraine. Many houses had been destroyed and electricity was no longer working by the end of the fighting.

On 20 February 2023, the regional Ukrainian military administration reported that Russian forces shelled civilian infrastructure in the village. On 14 July 2025, the village was recaptured by Russian forces.

== Demographics ==
In the 1989 USSR census, it was reported that the village had a population of 863, of whom 366 were men and 497 were women.

By the time of the 2001 census in independent Ukraine, that number had grown to 873. The native languages as of the 2001 census were 97.51% Ukrainian, 2.38% Russian, and 0.11% Bulgarian.

As of June 12, 2025, 1 person lives in the village.
