= Komsomolskoye massacre =

Part of the Second Chechen War

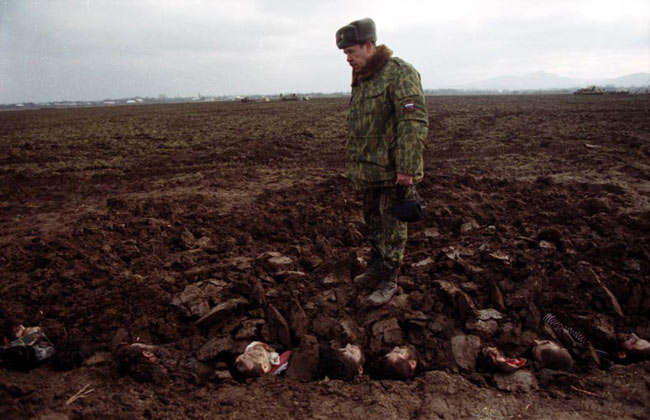
A Russian soldier stands on an open mass grave of Chechens shortly after the massacre

The Komsomolskoye massacre occurred following the Battle of Komsomolskoye (Chechen: Saadi-Kotar) during the Second Chechen War in March 2000. A prominent feature in the incident was the fate of a group of about 72 Chechen combatants who had surrendered on 20 March on a Russian public promise of amnesty, but had almost all either died or "disappeared" shortly after they were detained.

== 2000 massacre ==
According to Owen Matthews, a Newsweek correspondent who visited the ruins of Komsomolskoye soon after the end of the conflict, saw the remains of at least 11 Chechen fighters, saying "it is clear that many did not die in battle. At least one had his hands bound with heavy cable and his head was split open with a spade; another had his tongue cut out. Three others had their ears cut off—a Russian soldier at the scene joked that they lost their ears 'because they'd heard too much.'"

The United States Army Infantry School wrote that "the Ministry of Emergency Situations workers, who were tasked with removing civilian corpses and taking them to the nearby village of Goyskoye for identification (...) collected bodies lying by the river, some of which had ears, noses, or fingers sliced off. It was not known who had mutilated the bodies, or why".

Speaking to a leading Russian human rights group Memorial in 2003, Rustam Azizov, a surviving Chechen captive whose arm had to be later amputated due to lack of medical treatment, described suffering extreme abuse while incarcerated, which included severe beatings and torture after being taken to a "filtration camp" at Urus Martan. He also claimed to have witnessed injured Chechens being "crushed by tank caterpillars, smashed to death by rifle butts and even [trench] digging tools" and how "basements whereto we took our wounded with cut-off limbs were targeted by grenades or set ablaze", a mass killing of prisoners who had surrendered in response to the Russian President's Vladimir Putin's public offer of amnesty on 20 March as well as seeing the "disappeared" prisoners being forced to dig their own graves. In 2008, Prague Watchdog cited a testimony of the survivor "Aslan" speaking of prisoners being "beaten to death, buried alive in the ground, crushed by tanks and armored vehicles". Prague Watchdog commented that "many of the bodies were unidentified, because they had been mutilated beyond recognition. Eyewitnesses have told of corpses with severed ears and noses, gouged-out eyes and severed limbs. But in the official reports of federal 'victories' such details of the 'war against terror' were never mentioned."

=== Amateur video footage ===
An amateur video dated 21 March 2000, was uncovered and released in 2004 by Anna Politkovskaya, an investigative journalist for Novaya Gazeta. In it, a grainy black-and-white footage shows a large group of naked and half-naked Chechen prisoners who had accepted the Russian offer of amnesty, most of them injured; the captives shown are mostly men and adolescent boys, many of them having visible untreated wounds and some with missing limbs. There were two women who, unlike the men, do not show signs of beating but are separated and led away after exiting the truck. While moving from one crowded prison truck to another, the prisoners are physically abused by spetsnaz (special forces) of the Russian Ministry of Justice. At the end of the footage, some of the captives are ordered to unload their comrades who have already died during the transport. Several naked corpses are then dragged from the truck and placed in a heap next to the railway tracks. According to Politkovskaya, making the video public was the idea of the Russian junior officer who recorded it, as he hoped it would help free him from "a nightmare which continues to haunt him." For her, this video recalled "only one image, movies from the Nazi concentration camps".

Citing testimonies of Chechen witnesses, Politkovskaya alleged that those prisoners who were still alive were then sent to the notorious Chernokozovo detention center, a so-called "filtration camp", where many of them were tortured and killed by guards, and then buried by other inmates. Three families of the missing said that they have recognized their men among the people shown in the video, and Politkovskaya wrote that the footage shows them only shortly before they were killed. Of the three survivors that were known to Politkovskaya, two committed suicide and one disappeared. The two captive female Chechen fighters were tentatively identified by Paul J. Murphy as Brilant Abukarovna (25) and Lipa Biluyevna (23); according to the documentary film White Ravens: Nightmare in Chechnya, one of them was an ethnic Russian, but both of them had Chechen names. Abukarovna was allegedly killed already near Komsomolskoye while Biluyevna died at the Russian military base at Khankala, near Grozny.

== 1996 execution ==
Previously, Russian prisoners of war had been killed near Komsomolskoye on 12 April 1996 at the end of the First Chechen War, when four captured Russian soldiers were executed by the Chechen rebels. Chechen field commander Salaudin Timirbulatov, known as "Traktorist" ("Tractor Driver"), and the men under his command carried out the mass murder and videotaped its entire process. Junior Sergeant Pavel Sharonov and Private Alexey Shcherbatykh had their throats slit, while Private Sergey Mitryaev, personally by Timirbulatov, and Senior Sergeant Eduard Fedotkov were shot.

According to the Institute for War and Peace Reporting, "when Russia invaded Chechnya for a second time in September 1999, the video-tape became a powerful weapon in the Kremlin's propaganda war. It was shown to human rights organizations across Europe as well as to soldiers preparing for active service in the war-torn republic." Salaudin Timirbulatov was captured in March 2000 in the village of Duba-Yurt while forcing local residents to provide food and shelter for wounded rebel fighters. He was tried for murder in 2001; according to the prosecution, Timirbulatov subsequently confessed to the 1996 execution and showed where the bodies had been buried. On 15 February 2001, Salaudin Timirbulatov was sentenced to life in prison.
