= Velyka Novosilka offensive =

Military engagement during the Battle in the Russo-Ukrainian war in 2024 and 2025

- Part of the eastern and southern fronts of the Russian invasion of Ukraine
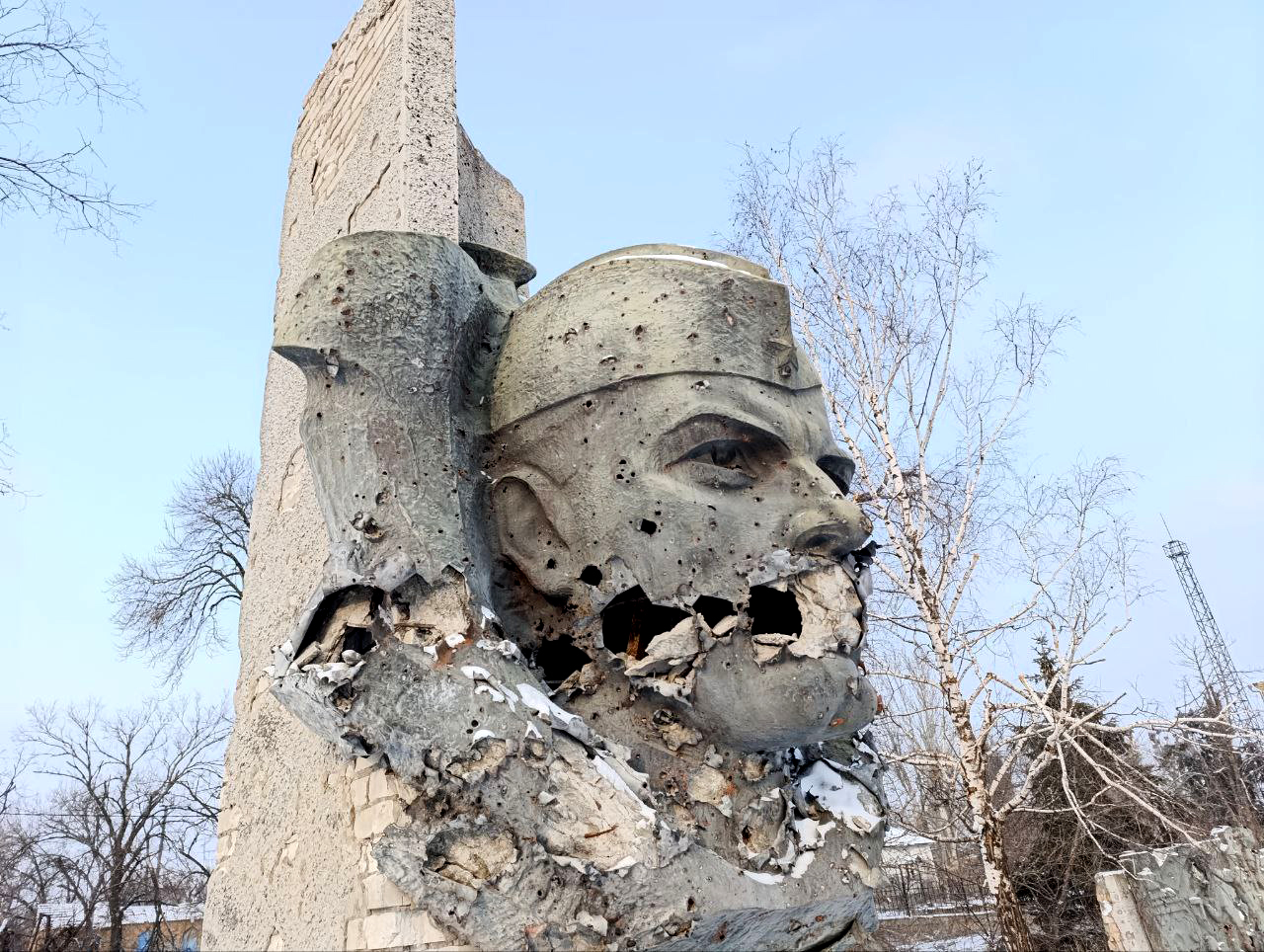
- Damaged statue of a Soviet soldier in Velyka Novosilka, March 2025
Date	11 November 2024 – 28 January 2025 (2 months, 2 weeks and 3 days)
Location	Velyka Novosilka settlement hromada, Donetsk Oblast and Malynivka rural hromada, Zaporizhzhia Oblast, Ukraine (Note: in the Zaporizhzhia – Donetsk Oblast border area)
Result	Russian victory
Territorial changes	Russia captures Velyka Novosilka and 9 villages (Note: Rivnopil, Novodarivka, Blahodatne, Novyi Komar, Rozdolne, Makarivka, Storozheve, Neskuchne and Vremivka) in Donetsk and Zaporizhzhia Oblasts

Belligerents
Russia	Ukraine

Commanders and leaders
(Russia) Unknown	Andrii Hnatov; Ihor Tymoshchuk

Units involved
Russian Armed Forces; Russian Ground Forces; Eastern Military District; 5th Combined Army Army; 57th Motor Rifle Brigade; 60th Motor Rifle Brigade; 127th Motor Rifle Division; 29th Combined Army Army; 36th Guards Motor Rifle Brigade; 35th Combined Arms Army; 36th Combined Arms Army; 5th Guards Tank Brigade; 37th Motor Rifle Brigade; Southern Military District; 49th Combined Arms Army; 34th Motor Rifle Brigade; Russian Navy; Pacific Fleet; 40th Naval Infantry Brigade; Baltic Fleet; 336th Naval Infantry Brigade; Russian Aerospace Forces; 11th Air and Air Defence Forces Army; GRU; Spetsnaz GRU; 14th Spetsnaz Brigade	Ukrainian Armed Forces; Ukrainian Ground Forces; Presidential Brigade; 3rd Mechanized Infantry Battalion; 20th Special Purpose Battalion; Operational Command North; 31st Mechanized Brigade; 110th Mechanized Brigade; Operational Command East; 23rd Mechanized Brigade; 425th Separate Assault Battalion; Operational Command West; 141st Separate Infantry Brigade; Territorial Defense Forces; 110th Territorial Defense Brigade; 123rd Territorial Defense Brigade; 48th Separate Assault Battalion; 241st Territorial Defense Brigade; Ministry of Internal Affairs; National Guard of Ukraine; 17th Separate Poltavska Brigade

Strength
Per Ukraine; ~ 40,000 soldiers	Per Russia; ~ 1,500 soldiers (within the town of Velyka Novosilka by 23 January 2025)

Casualties and losses
Unknown Ukraine claim: Heavy; 50 killed or wounded (12-18 Nov); 50 wounded (12-18 Nov); 200 killed per day (late December 2024); 12 tanks destroyed 20 AFV destroyed 2 captured	1 captured 16 killed (Note: Two soldiers killed by artillery shelling, others executed by Russian forces.); Ukraine claim: 50 soldiers killed or missing and many wounded (110th Mechanized Brigade only) Russia claim: 380 losses 1 captured 3 MaxxPro AFV; 1 Humvee; 1 2S22 Bohdana; 6 2S3 Akatsiya; 1 2S1 Gvozdika
- 2 civilians killed. At least 95% of the population, or approximately 4,900 residents, have been displaced.

A military engagement between the Russian Armed Forces and Ukrainian Armed Forces for control over the Ukrainian town of Velyka Novosilka in Volnovakha Raion, Donetsk Oblast, eastern Ukraine. and the nearby area began in November 2024 and ended with the Russian capture of the town in January 2025.

== Background ==
On 12 March 2022, after 15 days of fighting, Russian troops captured the nearby city of Volnovakha, located on a highway between Donetsk and Mariupol. The Ukrainian troops then retreated to the town of Velyka Novosilka. Two days later, fighting began in the settlement.

== Prior clashes ==
=== Early capture efforts (2022) ===
By 16 March, the Ukrainian General Staff confirmed that Russian troops had launched an offensive on Velyka Novosilka, reporting some gains. Throughout April, Russian troops repeatedly shelled residential areas in Velyka Novosilka.

==== Stalemate in the region ====
Following the initial offensive, a prolonged stalemate ensued. By mid-May, the U.S. Department of Defense reported that Russian forces near Velyka Novosilka appeared focused on completing the siege of Mariupol rather than pressing further assaults on the town. Despite renewed Russian efforts to advance on 24 and 31 August, Ukrainian forces successfully repelled these attacks. By December, reports of Russian troop buildups south of the town indicated reconnaissance missions rather than a well-prepared offensive, reflecting their limited operational capabilities. Concurrently, attempts to capture the nearby city of Vuhledar resulted in severe Russian losses and limited progress, further contributing to the deadlock.

=== Ukrainian counteroffensive (2023) ===
Between June and October 2023, Ukrainian forces made significant strides in southern Donetsk Oblast during their counteroffensive against Russian positions. On 4 June they achieved limited gains around Rivnopil and southwest of Velyka Novosilka, sparking speculation about a broader counteroffensive. By 11 June, Ukrainian troops had recaptured Neskuchne, Blahodatne, and Makarivka, overcoming entrenched Russian defenses, including fortified positions in schools and near rivers. The Ukrainian military claimed Russian forces destroyed a dam on the Mokri Yaly river to slow down their advance.

In late June, fighting escalated around Rivnopil, which Ukraine claimed had been liberated on 24 June, but this was only confirmed on 26 June. Operations continued into July, focusing on Staromaiorske, where Ukrainian forces faced extremely difficult conditions, including mine-filled roads and systematic defensive strategies employed by the Russian side. On 26 July, Staromaiorske was successfully recaptured, a significant achievement praised by Ukrainian President Volodymyr Zelenskyy. In August, attention shifted to Urozhaine, considered a Russian "stronghold". After intense fighting and heavy resistance, Urozhaine was liberated on 16 August, with retreating Russian forces suffering heavy losses.

=== Second Russian offensive (2024) ===
On 10 June 2024, Russian advances north of the village of Staromaiorske reportedly resulted in the capture of the entire settlement. Subsequently, on 13 July, Russian forces successfully took control of Urozhaine. On 18 July, Ukrainian authorities confirmed that their forces had withdrawn from the village, claiming that, despite Russian casualties amounting to over a hundred to several hundred fatalities "each day," their defensive positions had been destroyed, along with the village itself.

== Battle ==
=== Aftermath of the fall of Vuhledar and initial advances (11 November 2024 – 12 January 2025) ===
The capture of Vuhledar by the Russian army on 1 October resulted in a renewed opening of the southeastern Donetsk front. Vuhledar functioned as a Ukrainian stronghold in this section of the frontline for over two years. With the fall of this city Russian forces had the ability of starting advances towards Velyka Novosilka, which is located about 30 km to the west. One week later, the Russian Defence Ministry reported that the village of Zolota Nyva was under Russian control.

In early November, the Russian military began assault operations to the west of Velyka Novosilka around the Zaporizhzhia – Donetsk border, retaking the settlement of Rivnopil on 13 November. The following week, Russian forces intensified their assault efforts towards Velyka Novosilka from the east. At the same time, Russian forces also expanded the front to the northeast reaching the outskirts of Rozdolne, threatening to cut off the Velyka Novosilka – Bahatyr – Pokrovsk road. With these flanking maneuvers from the east, Russian assault groups attempt to bypass the Ukrainian fortifications, which are mainly built and aimed to stop attacks from the south.

Russian forces entered the warehouses located southeast of Velyka Novosilka on 23 November, bringing the frontline up to the outskirts of the town, and subsequently captured the buildings on 24 November. Meanwhile in the northeast, elements of Russia's 37th Motor Rifle Brigade and 40th Naval Infantry Brigade raised the flag in the center of Rozdolne, confirming that Russian forces had taken full control of the village by 29 November.

Starting in December, Russian forces launched an assault north of Velyka Novosilka where they entered the village of Novyi Komar, thus cutting the T0518 road towards Bahatyr. Meanwhile in the west, the Russian army also improved their positions seizing the settlement of Novodarivka on 3 December. A counterattack by the Ukrainian forces a few days later resulted in regaining full control of Novyi Komar and Rozdolne. At the same time, Russian troops started advances to the south of Velyka Novosilka along the Mokri Yaly river where they captured the village of Blahodatne.

A second Russian assault towards Novyi Komar occurred in mid December, where elements of the 40th Naval Infantry Brigade managed to entrench themselves in the southern part of the village. In the south, Russian forces continued advances along the river bank, pressuring the village of Makarivka from three sides. Due to near encirclement, the Ukrainian group was forced to retreat northwards. The Russian Defence Ministry announced that their forces took full control over Novyi Komar by 19 December, which was corroborated by a Ukrainian military observer, who confirmed the claim and further reported that Russian forces had also reoccupied Rozdolne.

On 23 December, published footage indicated that Makarivka had fallen under Russian control, while Russia also claimed to have captured the village of Storozheve. The following day, footage was published of Russian forces raising their flag over the northern part of Storozheve, confirming the village's capture. On 26 December, Russian forces advanced westward of Vremivka and severed Highway O-0510, which connects Velyka Novosilka to Huliaipole.

=== Encirclement and capture of Velyka Novosilka (13 – 28 January 2025) ===
In early to mid-January 2025, Russian forces advanced to the eastern bank of the Mokri Yaly River southwest of Novyi Komar. At the same time, Russian forces were also indicated to have seized Neskuchne, southwest of Velyka Novosilka. A few days later, Russian forces were reported to have entered the village of Vremivka, directly to the west of Velyka Novosilka.

In mid-January, Russian forces raised their flag over Vremivka, signifying that Vremivka had been captured. Subsequently, the Russian forces managed to break through Ukrainian defenses in the eastern part of Velyka Novosilka, advancing to the cemetery area and along Horishnia Road.

On 24 January, Russian troops raised several flags in the eastern and central areas of Velyka Novosilka, signifying advances in those parts of the settlement. The Russian Ministry of Defence said that their forces had bisected Velyka Novosilka, and Russian sources said that Ukrainian soldiers had been fully encircled in the southern part of the settlement.

The following day, additional flags were hoised by Russian troops in Velyka Novosilka, indicating advances to Zarichna Street in the northeast and the capture of agricultural fields north and northeast of the settlement. Geolocated footage indicated that Russian forces had secured control of 72% of Velyka Novosilka.

On the night of 25–26 January, DeepStateMap.Live reported that Velyka Novosilka had come under near complete Russian control. Russian Ministry of Defence announced the capture of the town the next day. DeepStateMap.Live displayed the settlement as completely captured on 28 January.

== Casualties ==
=== Civilian casualties ===
During the early capture efforts, the Governor of Donetsk Oblast, Pavlo Kyrylenko, reported that two civilians were killed due to shelling by Russian forces. On 3 December 2024, BBC Ukraine and Russia reported that at least 95% of the population, approximately 4,900 residents of the town of Velyka Novosilka, had been displaced.

=== Military casualties ===
==== Russian ====
Ukrainian media claimed that Russian troops are trying to move towards Makarivka and claimed that the Russian army lost more than 50 people killed and seriously wounded, as well as 50 wounded.

On 3 December 2024, the spokesperson for the Tavria Operational Command, Vladyslav Voloshyn, claimed that the Russian forces had suffered heavy losses.

On 8 December, the 425th Skala Separate Assault Battalion claimed that they had captured two Russian soldiers after launching a counterattack in the village of Rozdolne.

On 23 December, the spokesperson for the Tavria Operational Command, Vladyslav Voloshyn, claimed that approximately 200 soldiers were killed, and dozens of vehicles were destroyed daily by the Ukrainian Defense Forces. Voloshyn added that 8 tanks and up to 15 armored vehicles were destroyed on 22 December, while 4 tanks and up to 5 armored fighting vehicles were destroyed the following day.

==== Ukrainian ====
On 16 November, Russian media claimed that the Russian military successfully repelled a counterattack by assault groups from the Armed Forces of Ukraine, resulting in Ukrainian armed forces losses of up to 140 personnel, two tanks, two armored combat vehicles, six vehicles, and two 2S3 Akatsiya self-propelled artillery units.

On 24 November 2024, Ukrainian media reported that Russian Armed Forces executed five out of six Ukrainian soldiers captured near the settlement of Novodarivka in the Polohy district of Zaporizhzhia Oblast.

On 8 December, when Russian forces successfully occupied the village of Blahodatne, the Russian Ministry of Defense claimed that the Armed Forces of Ukraine had lost up to 190 soldiers, two 2S3 Akatsiya self-propelled artillery units, two MaxxPro armored combat vehicles, and one M109 howitzer within a single day, at the same time Russian media claimed that Russian forces had captured a serviceman from the separate Presidential brigade.

On 11 December, Russian media claimed that Russian forces defeated the formations of two ground defense brigades and one National Guard brigade, with Ukrainian Armed Forces losses per day amounting to up to 150 military personnel, HMMWV and MaxxPro armored combat vehicles made in the U.S., three vehicles, one 2S22 Bohdana self-propelled artillery unit, two 2S3 Akatsiya self-propelled howitzers, and one 2S1 Gvozdika self-propelled artillery mount.

On 22 December, the drone systems battalion of the 110th Separate Mechanized Brigade released drone footage showing the execution of Ukrainian prisoners. Ivan Sekach, a press officer for the 110th Separate Mechanized Brigade of Ukraine, explained that there were six Ukrainian soldiers at the position, two of whom were killed during artillery shelling, and the remainder were executed by Russian soldiers.

In early January 2025, Russian forces executed three soldiers from the 141st Separate Infantry Brigade after their position was overrun. At the same time, the Office of the Prosecutor General of Ukraine reported that it was investigating the execution of two prisoners of war by Russian soldiers near the village of Vremivka.

Pasi Paroinen, a military expert of the finnish Black Bird Group, doubted the official Ukrainian account that the troop contingent in the city could evacuate without sustaining major casualties, as soldiers would have had to cross a river without crossings and walk through at least a mile of open flood plains to escape. According to him, it is possible that several hundred Ukrainian soldiers had been killed or captured.

On 19 February 2025, Ihor Tymoshchuk, a company commander in Ukraine’s 110th Brigade, said that after getting hit by a massive Russian attack and being stuck in a full-on siege by Russian forces for a whole month, the 110th Brigade lost 50 soldiers—either dead or missing. And way more Ukrainian troops got injured.

== Analysis ==
=== Strategic value ===
Velyka Novosilka is seen as a strategic point in the Donbas due to its location close to Dnipropetrovsk Oblast. The settlement, together with Kurakhove, was one of the few remaining Ukrainian-controlled strongholds in southern Donetsk Oblast. Therefore, it also functioned as a regional logistical hub for the Ukrainian forces.

The Institute for the Study of War assessed on 24 November that the Russian military command was planning to advance from Velyka Novosilka into eastern Dnipropetrovsk Oblast to envelop the Ukrainian forces in the Pokrovsk – Kurakhove area from the west. This would also threaten important Ukrainian ground lines of communication running from Zaporizhzhia into western Donetsk Oblast.

The UK Ministry of Defence had stated that Velyka Novosilka served as a "linchpin of Ukraine's front line."

The village of Shevchenko, nearby Velyka Novosilka, is noted to be of major geo-economic importance, being located in close proximity to lithium worth hundreds of billions of dollars, stored in the Shevchenko lithium deposit. Russian occupation authorities began planning the exploitation of the deposit in January 2024. Russian-Israeli writer Edward Topol argues that by seizing Ukrainian lithium, Russia aims to keep Russian momentum and pressure on the European energy market with a monopoly on European lithium.

=== Tactics ===
A Russian milblogger claimed that Russian forces were utilizing a new "carousel" tactic during their raids on Urozhaine. The milblogger stated that this "carousel" tactic enables Russian tanks to fire continuously on Ukrainian forces, both while stationary and while maneuvering. The milblogger further explained that as one tank is engaged in firing at Ukrainian forces, the crew of a second tank positions itself behind the first tank to reload.

== See also ==
- Pokrovsk offensive
- Battle of Chasiv Yar
- Battle of Toretsk
- Battle of Huliaipole
- Battle of Kurakhove
- List of military engagements during the Russian invasion of Ukraine
