= Pryiutne =

Pryiutne Прию́тне
- Village
- Interactive map of Pryiutne
- Location within Zaporizhzhia Oblast Location within Ukraine
- Coordinates: 47°43′45″N 36°40′20″E
- Country: Ukraine
- Oblast: Zaporizhzhia Oblast
- Raion: Polohy Raion
- Hromada: Malynivka rural hromada
- Elevation: 155 m (509 ft)

Population (2001)
  - Total: 522

Pryiutne (Ukrainian: Прию́тне) is a village (selo) in Ukraine, administratively located in Polohy Raion (district) of Zaporizhzhia Oblast (province). In 2001, it had a population of 522.

It was part of Huliaipole Raion until 17 July 2020, when in accordance with country-wide decentralization reforms, Huliaipole Raion was abolished and its area merged into Polohy Raion. Since March 2022, the village has been occupied by Russian forces.

== Demographics ==
According to the 1989 USSR census, the population of the village was 485 people, of which 220 were men and 265 were women.

According to the 2001 Ukrainian census, the village had a population of 522. Their native languages were 94.11% Ukrainian and 5.89% Russian.
