= Chernokozovo =

Rural locality in the Chechen Republic, Russia

Coordinates: 43°41′N 45°22′E

Chernokozovo (Russian: Чернокозово) is a rural locality (a selo) in Naursky District of the Chechen Republic, Russia, located north of the Terek River.

In 2019, the population of Chernokozovo was about 3,240 residents. At the beginning of the Second Chechen War, Chernokozovo was defended by Chechen separatist forces, while the Russians bombed and shelled it with the BM-21 Grad rocket artillery systems.

Chernokozovo is a site of Chernokozovo detention center, which served as the main part of the filtration camp system during the Second Chechen War.
