= 14th Guards Spetsnaz Brigade =

14th Guards Separate Special Purpose Brigade Order of Kutuzov
- 14-я отдельная гвардейская ордена Кутузова бригада специального назначения
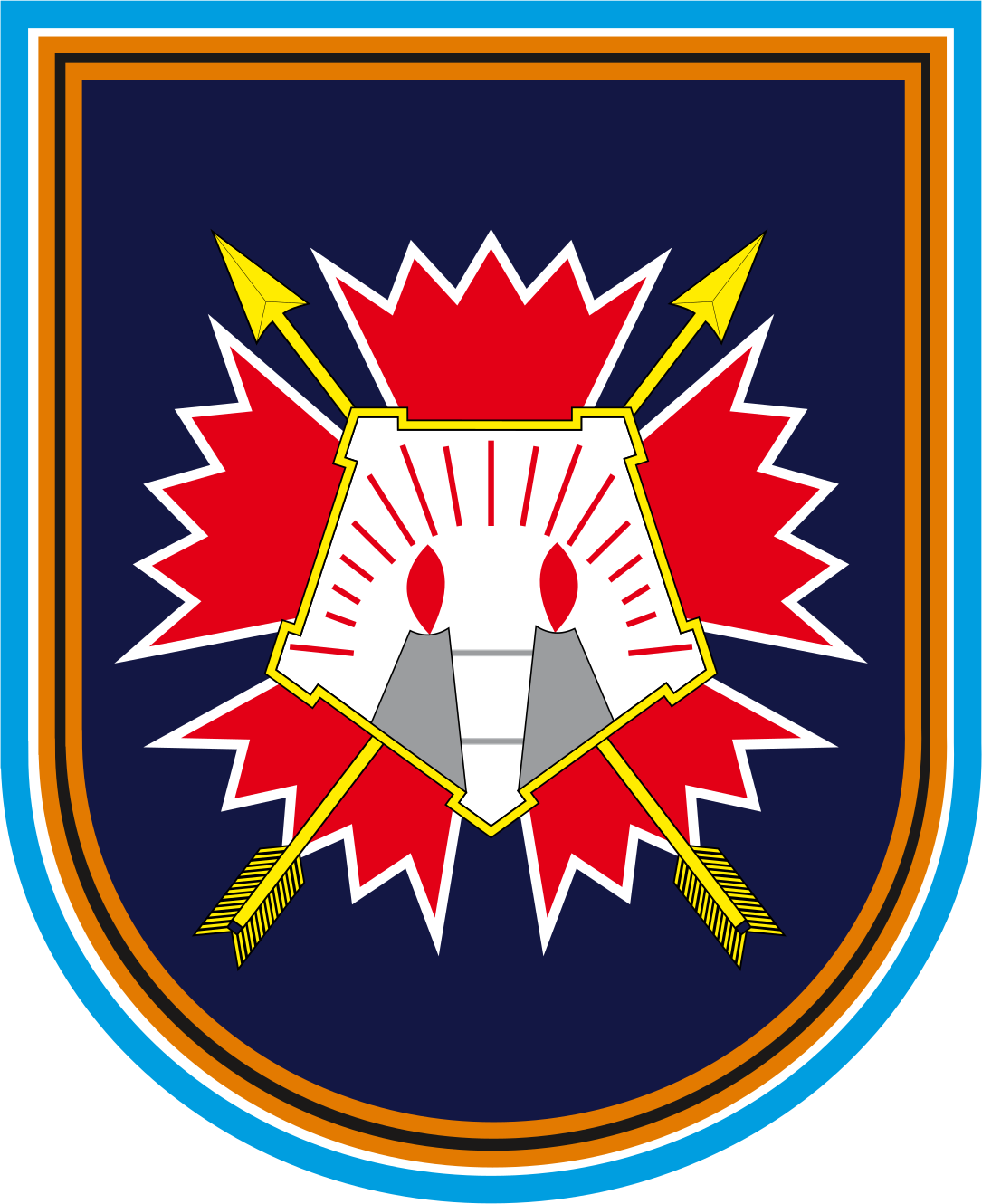
- Active: 1963–present
- Country: Soviet Union (1963–1991); Russia (1991–present)
- Branch: Spetsnaz GRU
- Size: Brigade
- Garrison/HQ: Ussuriysk, Primorsky Krai

The 14th Guards Separate Special Purpose Brigade Order of Kutuzov (Russian: 14-я отдельная гвардейская ордена Кутузова бригада специального назначения, romanized: 14-ya otdelnaya gvardeyskaya ordena Kutuzova brigada spetsialnogo naznacheniya) is a spetsnaz military formation of Russia, subordinate to the Spetsnaz GRU. The unit is garrisoned in Ussuriysk, Primorsky Krai. Its military unit number is 74854.

It has been reported by the BBC that the unit took part in the Battle of Vuhledar of the Russian Invasion of Ukraine.

== History ==
The unit was formed on 1 January 1963.

Within the Soviet-Afghan War the unit participated from 1984 onwards with over 200 servicemen. They were primarily tasked with denying the Mujahideen supplies from Iran and Pakistan.

They participated in both the First Chechen War in January to April 1995 and the Second Chechen War where they were engaged in the Battle of Komsomolskoye. They were active in the Second Chechen War from 1999 to 2006.

During the Russian invasion of Ukraine the unit was part of the battle of Vuhledar between early 2023 and October 2024. Between November 2024 and January 2025, the unit took part in the Russian 2024 Velyka Novosilka offensive.

== Commanders ==
Commanders of the 14th Spetsnaz Brigade
No.	Name	From	To
1	Colonel Pavel N. Rymin	1963	1970
2	Colonel Alexander A. Drozdov	1970	1973
3	Colonel Nikolai A. Demchenko	1973	1975
4	Colonel Anatoly M. Baglai	1975	1978
5	Colonel Viktor F. Grishmanovsky	1978	1980
6	Colonel Vitaly A. Onatsky	1980	1987
7	Colonel Yakov A. Kurys	1987	1992
8	Colonel Aleksander I. Likhidchenko	1992	1997
9	Colonel Andrei M. Rumyankov	1997	1999
10	Colonel Sergei P. Degtyarev	1999	2011
11	Colonel Arsalan Irinchinov	2011	present

== Structure ==
Structure of the unit as of 2023:

- 282nd Special Purpose Detachment (military unit number 20662)
- 294th Special Purpose Detachment (military unit number 20706)
- 308th Special Purpose Detachment (military unit number 20707)
- 742nd Special Purpose Detachment
