= Novodarivka, Zaporizhzhia Oblast =

Novodarivka Новода́рівка
- Village
- Interactive map of Novodarivka
- Location of Novodarivka within Zaporizhzhia Oblast Novodarivka (Ukraine)
- Coordinates: 47°46′51″N 36°38′4″E
- Country: Ukraine
- Oblast: Zaporizhzhia
- Raion: Polohy
- Hromada: Malynivka

Area
  - Total: 0.841 km^{2} (0.325 sq mi)

Population (2001)
  - Total: 48
  - Density: 57/km^{2} (150/sq mi)

Novodarivka (Ukrainian: Новода́рівка; Russian: Новодаровка, romanized: Novodarovka) is a village in southern Ukraine. Administratively, it is part of Malynivka rural hromada, Polohy Raion, Zaporizhzhia Oblast. In 2001, it had a population of 48 people.

== History ==
The village was part of Huliaipole Raion until 17 July 2020, when in accordance with country-wide decentralization reforms in Ukraine, Huliaipole Raion was abolished and its territory merged into Polohy Raion.

During the full-scale Russian invasion of Ukraine, the village fell under the occupation of the Russian military for over a year. The Russians heavily mined the village, and dug dugouts underneath residential houses. On 4 June 2023, during the 2023 Ukrainian counteroffensive the village was announced to have been liberated by the 110th Territorial Defense Brigade of the Ukrainian armed forces. After the village's liberation, on 11 June Ukraine accused Russian forces of blowing up a dam near the village and flooding both banks of the Mokri Yaly river.

On 3 December 2024, the village was again seized by the Russian forces as part of an offensive on Velyka Novosilka.

== Demographics ==
According to the 1989 Soviet census, the population of Novodarivka was 85 people, of whom 35 were men and 50 were women.

By the 2001 Ukrainian census, the population had shrunk to 48 people. According to the 2001 Ukrainian census, the native languages of the villagers were 86.27% Ukrainian, 11.76% Russian, and 1.97% unspecified other languages.
