= 40th Separate Guards Naval Infantry Brigade =

40th Separate Guards Krasnodarsko-Kharbinsky Twice Red Banner Naval Infantry Brigade
- 40-я отдельная гвардейская Краснодарско-Харбинская дважды Краснознамённая бригада морской пехоты
- Active: 1918–present 2009–present (as Naval Infantry)
- Country: RSFSR (until 1922); Soviet Union (until 1991); Russia
- Branch: Soviet Army (until 1991); Russian Ground Forces (until 2007); Russian Navy
- Type: Marines
- Role: Amphibious warfare
- Part of: Pacific Fleet
- Garrison/HQ: Petropavlovsk-Kamchatskiy
- Engagements: World War II; Soviet–Japanese War; Soviet invasion of Manchuria; Cold War; Sino-Soviet split; Albanian–Soviet split; Russo-Ukrainian War; Russian invasion of Ukraine; Northern Ukraine campaign; Battle of Ivankiv; Eastern Ukraine campaign; 2024 Velyka Novosilka offensive
- Decorations: Order of the Red Banner (2); Guards

Commanders
- Current commander: Colonel Dmitri Ivanovich Petukh

Insignia
- Unofficial sleeve patch

The 40th Separate Guards Krasnodarsko-Kharbinsky Twice Red Banner Naval Infantry Brigade is a brigade of the Russian Marines. It is based in Petropavlovsk-Kamchatskiy in the Russian Far East and has the Military Unit Number (в/ч) 10103. It is part of the North-East Group of Troops and Forces, a joint command directed by the headquarters of the Navy's Kamchatka Flotilla.

== History ==
The brigade has a rather unusual history, in that it can trace its origins to a Red Army division formed in 1918, which became best known as the 22nd Rifle Division (not to be confused with the 22nd Guards Rifle Division).

=== Historical names ===
2nd Infantry Division
Nikolayevsky Infantry Division
30th Nikolayevsky Soviet Infantry Division
3rd Separate Naval Infantry Regiment
40th Separate Naval Infantry Brigade
40th Separate Motor Rifle Brigade
22nd Motor Rifle Division
22nd Rifle Division

=== Early history ===
The division was first formed on 22 September 1918, as the 2nd Infantry Division. It was based on guerrilla groups from Nikolayevsk (in the Volga region), Novouzensk (in Samara Governorate) and Malousensk Volost (Samara Governorate), and two volunteer workers' units, from Balashov and Penza (both in the Volga region).

From 2 October 1918 it was known as the Nikolayevsky Infantry Division, from 24 November 1918 as the 30th Nikolayevsky Soviet Infantry Division and from 13 January 1919 as the Nikolayevsky Infantry Division. After the previous redesignations, on 25 March 1919, it was named the 22nd Rifle Division.

After the end of the Russian Civil War, the division was stationed in Krasnodar. A few years later, the 74th Taman Territorial Rifle Division (1921–1942) separated from the division.

For military services on February 21, 1931, the division was awarded the Honor of the Red Banner.

In 1937, the division was relocated to the Far East, where a military conflict with the Japanese was brewing. In the summer of 1938, the 195th Yeisk rifle regiment of the division took part in the Battle of Lake Khasan.

=== Second World War ===
At the start of Operation Barbarossa in June 1941, the 22nd Rifle Division was stationed in the Far East. It did not take part in the battles with Germany, but between 1941 and 1943, the division sent 6086 soldiers to the Western Front. In May 1945, the 22nd Rifle Division became part of the 1st Red Banner Army, an independent coastal formation, in the Russian Far East. It saw active service during the Soviet invasion of Manchuria.

=== Cold War ===
In late 1945, the 22nd Rifle Division became part of the 137th Rifle Corps at Kamchatka. It was re-designated from 22nd Rifle Division to 22nd Motor Rifle Division in 1957, part of the 43rd Army Corps. In 1980 it became part of the new 25th Army Corps. In 1982, its 168th Tank Regiment became the 59th Separate Tank Battalion.

During the late 1980s, the division included the following units:

- Division Headquarters (Chapayevka)
- 59th Separate Tank Battalion
- 211th Motor Rifle Regiment (Dolinovka)
- 246th Motor Rifle Regiment (Rodygino)
- 304th Motor Rifle Regiment
- 996th Artillery Regiment
- 1006th Anti-Aircraft Rocket Regiment
- 309th Separate Rocket Battalion
- 795th Separate Anti-Tank Battalion
- 784th Separate Reconnaissance Battalion
- 765th Separate Engineer-Sapper Battalion
- 124th Separate Communications Battalion
- 591st Separate Chemical Defense Battalion
- 197th Separate Equipment Maintenance and Recovery Battalion
- 24th Separate Medical Battalion
- 1251st Separate Material Support Battalion
- Military Counterintelligence Department

=== After the dissolution of the Soviet Union ===
Until 1 June 2002, it was designated the 22nd Motor Rifle Division. It then became the 40th Separate Motor Rifle Brigade. In September 2007 it became the 40th Separate (twice Red Banner) Krasnodar-Harbin twice Red Banner Naval Infantry Brigade. This situation lasted until March, 2009 when it became the 3rd Naval Infantry Regiment. In 2013, the regiment was redesignated back to become the 40th Naval Infantry Brigade.

It is reported that its current commander (when?) is Colonel Valery Zhila.

Today it is reported to include:

- Assault (Airborne) Battalion
- Naval Infantry Battalion
- Artillery Battery
- 186th NI Engineer Battalion

The brigade also incorporates a tank battalion which reportedly re-equipped with the T-80BV main battle tank in 2021.

It was reported on 19 March 2022 that the brigade was transferred to Belarus to replenish Russian losses after the Russian invasion of Ukraine. By May 19, 2022, it was in active combat in Ukraine. The brigade was involved in the defence of Urozhaine during the 2023 Ukrainian counteroffensive and was actively involved in the 2024 Velyka Novosilka offensive.

On 20 July 2023 the unit was awarded the "Guards" title.

On 29 November 2024, elements of the 40th Naval Infantry Brigade, along with the 37th Motor Rifle Brigade of Russia, raised the flag in the center of Rozdolne and seized control of the settlement. As of September 2025, elements of the brigade were reported operating in eastern Ukraine together with elements from other naval infantry units, including the 177th naval infantry regiment as well as the 155th, 61st and 336th naval infantry brigades.
