= Russian filtration camps for Ukrainians =

Camps used to forcibly displace Ukrainians to Russia

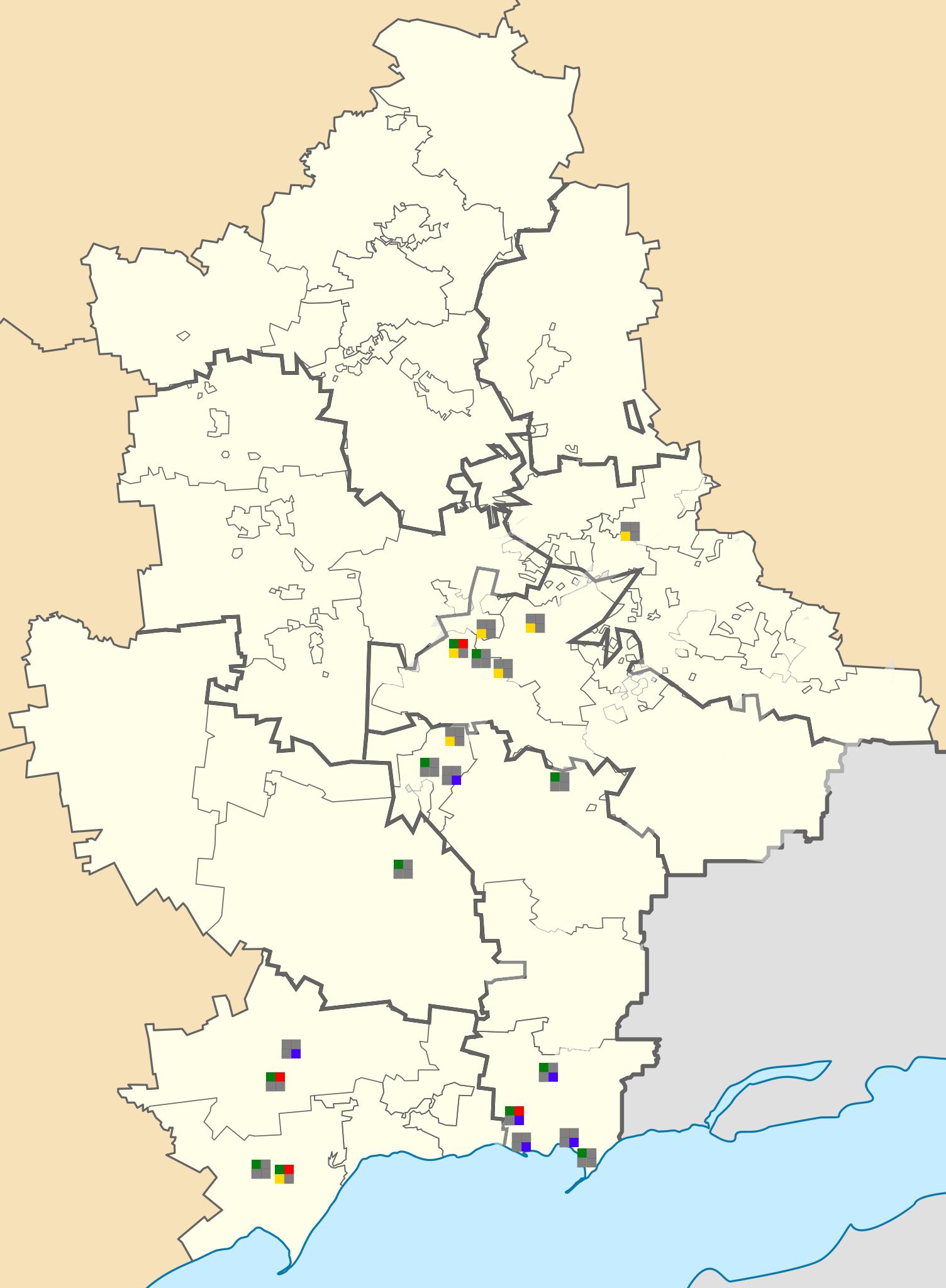
Map of 20 Russian filtration camps in the Donetsk Oblast of Ukraine, data according to Conflict Observatory and the researchers from Yale University. Color coding of camp types: registration secondary interrogation detention holding

Filtration camps, also referred to as concentration camps, are camps used by Russian forces during the Russian invasion of Ukraine to register, interrogate, and detain Ukrainian citizens in regions under Russian occupation before transferring them into Russia, sometimes as part of forced population transfers. Filtration camp detainees undergo a system of security checks and personal data collection. Detainees are subject to widespread torture, killings, rape, starvation, and other grave human rights violations.

The number of Ukrainian citizens relocated to Russia cannot be independently verified. According to the Ukrainian government and independent sources, some 1.6 to 4.7 million Ukrainians have been forcibly relocated to Russia, with about 250,000-700,000 of these being children. The Russian government denies it is forcibly removing Ukrainians to Russia and calls the deportations "evacuation."

According to a leaked Russian occupation plan, "filtration" was to represent the foundation of their counter-insurgency and pacification strategy, with Russian occupation authorities planning to pass large portions of the Ukrainian population through the "filtration" process after occupying the entire country.

== Overview ==
Occupying powers in international conflicts have the right to register persons within their area of control or even detain civilians under certain circumstances; however, Russia's filtration system violates multiple elements of international humanitarian law and may involve multiple grave human rights abuses.

Ukrainians in Russian-occupied zones are often left unable to flee into Ukrainian-held territory, having to either stay in areas experiencing unliveable conditions or flee to other areas under Russian control or into Russia itself. To enter Russia, many Ukrainians are forced to undergo "filtration", a process during which they are interrogated, and their biometric data is taken. While awaiting "filtration", Ukrainians are settled in so-called "filtration camps", set up ad hoc in various public buildings where the "filtration" takes place. After passing "filtration", Ukrainians are reportedly often forcibly transferred to the Russian Far East.

According to Meduza, filtration most likely occurs either at "filtration posts," which are essentially border crossing points where people have been obliged to voluntarily wait their turn due to the large influx of people trying to cross, or at actual filtration camps where people awaiting "filtration" are temporarily detained.

According to a leaked Russian occupation plan, "filtration" was intended to serve as a pacification and counter-insurgency strategy following Russian occupation of the entirety of Ukrainian territory. According to the occupation plans, large portions of the Ukrainian populations were to be rounded up during door-to-door sweeps and passed through "filtration" in order to compile comprehensive counter-intelligence files: "Filtration would be used to intimidate people, to determine whether they needed to be displaced into Russia, and to lay the groundwork for records to monitor and disrupt resistance networks."

=== Location of the filtration camps ===
Since June 2014 Russian forces have operated a filtration facility in a former "Izolatsia" industrial plant, which became notorious for use of torture and summary executions. The prison continues to operate after the 2022 full-scale invasion.

As of June 2022, most filtration camps were attested to be located in towns and villages across the puppet quasi-state, the Donetsk People's Republic. Filtration camps have been set up in what had previously been public buildings like schools, cultural centres, sports halls, community centres, police stations, and makeshift camp areas.

In a July 2022 statement to the OSCE, a U.S. diplomat stated that the U.S. had identified at least 18 filtration camp sites set up by Russia both in Ukrainian and Russian territory, with preparations for filtration camps having been undertaken even before the beginning of the Russian invasion of Ukraine. The filtration camps had been set up in Ukrainian territory that had recently come under Russian occupation by Russian officials working alongside proxy groups, the U.S. diplomat said. The U.S. diplomat said the filtration camps were set up in what had been schools, sport centres, and cultural institutions. An article published by the Polish Spokesman for the Minister Coordinator of Special Services found and published the location of six such camps "where there are Russian torture chambers used against Ukrainians."

In November 2024, the Belarusian Investigative Center, the Skhemy project, and Radio Liberty released a joint investigation into a filtration camp for Ukrainians that existed in 2022 in the Belarusian town of Narovlya (Gomel region).

=== Intake and detention ===
Fleeing Ukrainians have been transferred into filtration camps unknowingly, being falsely told that they are being taken to Ukrainian-held territory. Some are forced to pass "filtration" while fleeing combat or forcibly herded into the process by occupation forces or authorities, while still others agree to undergo the process in order to be able to enter Russia or continue travel within occupied areas.

After arriving in filtration camps, detainees are told they are not allowed to leave the town in which the filtration camp is located as they await "filtration." Detention in filtration camps has been reported to last anywhere from hours to many weeks.

=== Living conditions ===
Living conditions in the camps are often squalid. The camps are poorly organised. Those detained in the camps described sleeping on the floors or on cardboard, living in poor sanitary conditions, and meal rations that were scant or altogether absent.

=== "Filtration" and interrogation ===
During filtration, detainees are photographed, fingerprinted, and interrogated, and the contents of their phones are examined. They undergo detailed interrogations about personal background, family ties, and political views and allegiances. Detainees are questioned about whether they know anyone serving in the Ukrainian army. Detainees are asked about their political views and any ties to the Azov Regiment. Men and, in some instances, women are strip-searched to be examined for Ukrainian nationalist tattoos. During "filtration," men have been subjected to inspections looking for possible signs of bruising from body armour or rifle use. Officials involved in the "filtration" process have said that the collected information is used to populate a database.

"Filtration" usually ends in one of two ways: either the detainee is given a document certifying that they have passed filtration, or they are detained for further interrogation. Even after passing "filtration," some men are interrogated again during their passage from the filtration camp across areas under Russian control. Children are sometimes separated from their parents and separately transferred to Russia during filtration as part of the child abductions in the 2022 Russian invasion of Ukraine.

According to the U.S. State Department, Ukrainians with affiliations with the Ukrainian armed forces, government, media, or civil society are "filtered" from the rest of the detainees and subject to transfer to detention facilities where they reportedly face torture and summary execution.

=== Violence, torture, and killings ===
Detainees perceived as having ties to the Ukrainian armed forces or Ukrainian state and pro-Ukrainian and/or anti-Russian views are subject to maltreatment, arbitrary detention, torture, and forced disappearance. Beatings, torture with electricity, and killings have been reported by people interrogated in the filtration camps. Women and girls are at risk of sexual abuse. One witness said filtration camp staff forced detainees to give false testimony (blame Ukraine for destroying their homes) on camera.

=== Release and forced deportations ===
After passing "filtration," some people are released within the DNR, while others are deported onward into Russia. People that have passed through the filtration camps have said that they had been ultimately sent to various cities across Russia after their release from the filtration camps, with many having been sent to the Russian Far East. After arriving in Russia, they are usually first temporarily placed in refugee centres before being instructed or coerced by Russian officials to travel to other destinations within Russia, while some are able to go to stay with relatives or friends in Russia, arrange their own accommodation in Russia, or leave Russia. Russian officials have pressured Ukrainians placed in temporary refugee centres to apply for asylum or Russian citizenship or face indefinite detention in the centres. Some are re-interrogated by Russian officials after arriving in Russia. Ukrainians are not officially prohibited from leaving Russia but in practice face obstacles (sometimes significant ones) in doing so. An ad hoc network of activists has emerged to help Ukrainians leave Russia. According to the U.S. State Department, Ukrainian citizens are coerced to sign agreements to stay in Russia prior to their release from filtration camps, thereby hindering their return to Ukraine.

Ukrainian intelligence has said that Ukrainian citizens released from filtration camps are offered employment in economically depressed regions of Russia by Russian employment centres.

Mikhail Mizintsev, chief of Russia's National Defense Management Center, said in May 2022 that 1,185,791 people have been transferred into Russia. According to the U.S. State Department, "between 900,000 and 1.6 million Ukrainian citizens, including 260,000 children," have passed through the "filtration" process and been deported, "often to isolated regions in the Far East" in a "pre-meditated [...] apparent effort to change the demographic makeup of parts of Ukraine."

==== Remaining in Russia ====
Russia has enacted measures to facilitate the process of granting temporary asylum and Russian citizenship to Ukrainians. In April 2022, Russia adopted federal legislation that includes provisions streamlining applications for Russian citizenship for Russian-speaking Ukrainians from Donbas. On March 5, 2022, Putin signed a decree to help civilians fleeing hostilities that established simplified administrative procedures for Ukrainians entering Russia and seeking asylum or citizenship. Ukrainians arriving in Russia from the DNR and LNR are entitled to a one-time cash payment. Asylum seekers and refugees in Russia are entitled to a number of rights, including food and temporary accommodation and resources and support in finding work and housing; in practice, people face significant obstacles in claiming these rights. Ukrainians must hand over their passport to obtain a temporary asylum card without being informed that they are entitled to retrieve their passport and exit Russia, leading some to believe they are not allowed to exit Russia.

==== Escape from "filtration" and forced deportation ====
Ukrainians that have fled into Georgia have avoided forced deportations into Russian cities that are reportedly common after passing "filtration." Some Ukrainians that were detained in filtration camps have said that informing filtration camp officials that they have concrete plans to go to a specific Russian city enabled them to be released and told to find their own way there, thus enabling them to escape into Georgia and avoid forced transfers.

Some people reported that they needed to slip out of filtration camps in Novoazovsk or post-filtering from Taganrog (in SIZO-2) or Rostov-on-Don to escape through neighboring countries like Georgia, rather than be forcibly sent to distant parts of Russia.

== History ==
On 15 March 2022, The Guardian reported that witnesses have said that Russian troops have ordered women and children out of a bomb shelter in Mariupol. One witness said they were forcibly bussed with two or three hundred others to Novoazovsk, where they had to wait for hours inside the buses until they were ordered to go through a group of tents to what was called a filtration camp. Satellite imagery showed a group of tents in Bezimenne, near Novoazovsk. Representatives of Donetsk People's Republic and Luhansk People's Republic said they had set up a "tent city of 30 tents" with a capacity for 450 people.

Russian government newspaper Rossiyskaya Gazeta reported that 5,000 Ukrainians had been processed in the Bezimenne camp and that they had run checks to prevent "Ukrainian nationalists from infiltrating Russia disguised as refugees so they could avoid punishment." One witness said she was extensively questioned by men who said they were from the FSB. She was questioned about her background and described the questioning as "very degrading." The group was then taken to Rostov.

In May 2022, videos with Ukrainian civilians apologizing to Russian soldiers, with some of them saying that they had undergone a "denazification course," have appeared on social media.

In November 2022, the head of the UN Human Rights Monitoring Mission in Ukraine, Matilda Bogner, reported on the "admission procedures" in the penal colony near Olenivka, which often involved beatings, threats, dog attacks, mock executions, forced nudity, electrical, and positional torture. The UN agency also reported receiving information about nine deaths in Olenivka in April 2022.

In December 2022, OHCHR reported that Russian security services may have forcibly disappeared a woman who had failed the "filtration process" in the Rostov region on 10 October.

== Reactions ==
=== Russia ===
The Russian Embassy in the United States has said the filtration camps are "checkpoints for civilians leaving the zone of active hostilities."

=== Ukraine ===
Ukrainian officials have compared the filtration camps to filtration camps in Chechnya.

=== United States ===
United States ambassador to the UN Linda Thomas-Greenfield said, "I do not need to spell out what these so-called 'filtration camps' are reminiscent of. It's chilling, and we cannot look away." She cited reports that FSB agents confiscated passports, IDs, and mobile phones, as well as reports of Ukrainian families being separated. The US envoy to the OSCE, Michail Carpenter, told the organization's permanent council that according to credible reporting, Ukrainian civilians in the filtration camps were interrogated and those suspected of ties to independent media or the military were beaten or tortured before being transferred to the Donetsk region, "where they are reportedly disappeared or murdered."

=== Civil society ===
Tanya Lokshina, director of Human Rights Watch for Europe and Asia, said, "Under international human rights law, forced displacement or transfer doesn't necessarily mean people were forced into a vehicle at gunpoint, but rather that they found themselves in a situation that left them no choice." She pointed out that the Geneva Convention prohibits "individual or mass forcible transfers, as well as deportations of protected persons from occupied territory, are prohibited, regardless of their motive."

In an interview with Current Time TV, human rights activist Pavel Lisyansky said that the "courses" are often accompanied by physical violence, moral pressure, and humiliation, and compared them to the Xinjiang re-education camps, which likely inspired these filtration camps and methods. Lisyansky also said that he knows three or four cases of Ukrainian civilians getting killed and their documents destroyed after they had a conflict with their "curator."

== See also ==
- Allegations of genocide of Ukrainians in the Russo-Ukrainian War
- Filtration camp system in Chechnya
- Gulag – the prison system of the USSR
- Concentration camps in Russia and the USSR
- Political prisoners in Russia
- Russian war crimes
- Sonderbehandlung – Euphemism for mass murder used by Nazi functionaries
