= Zura Bitiyeva =

Chechen activist (1948–2003)

Zura Bitiyeva (1948 – May 21, 2003) (Cyrilic:Зура Битиева; also transliterated as Bitieva) was a locally well-known Chechen human rights activist who was extrajudicially executed by what is assumed to be a Russian government death squad in 2003 after she complained to the European Court of Human Rights of ill treatment during an earlier illegal detention. Three other members of her immediate family were also killed in the same attack.

Bitiyeva's was not an isolated case, and many people in Chechnya who have submitted cases of serious human rights violations to the ECHR have been also subjected to reprisals, including being killed or forcibly disappeared.

== Life ==
Bitiyeva was born in 1948 in Kazakhstan during the forced exile of the entire Chechen nation. Later she returned to Chechnya, settling in the village of Kalinovskaya (Kalinovskaia). During the First Chechen War, she was actively involved in anti-war protests. In February 2000, during the Second Chechen War, she and her son Idris were arbitrarily detained by the Russian forces and taken to the unofficial detention centre known as Chernokozovo, a "filtration camp" infamous of torture, rape and other abuses. When she has arrived at Chernokozovo, the guards told her she would "never leave alive." Bitiyeva, who tried to defend other prisoners, went on hunger strike and was released in a very ill condition. Her friends helped her go to Turkey, but once her health was slightly better, she went back to Chechnya and began collecting evidence of crimes committed against civilian population of the republic, submitting it to United Nations and international human rights organizations. In February 2003, Bitiyeva had been part of the group of women that demanded the opening of a mass grave site discovered near the settlement of Kapustino. She also worked with the Russian NGO Committee of Soldiers' Mothers.

== Death ==
On May 21, 2003, in the middle of a night, a group of over ten unidentified Russian-speaking special forces troops (four of them masked) arrived in Kalinovskaya in two UAZ-452 minivans. The troops broke into her family house and bound, gagged and hooded Zura and her son Idris, as well as her husband Ramzan and her brother Abubakar, and then shot all four of them in the back of their heads (Zura was shot also in her hands). Only her other son, Eldard, escaped death by hiding just in time. The killers also stole a videocassette recorder from the house. Later in the morning, two local men (Turpal Ismailov and Islambek Gadiyev) were also killed in their homes, presumably by the same group of attackers.

== ECHR ruling ==
Bitiyeva had filed a complaint against Moscow with the European Court of Human Rights in 2000 for abuse while in detention (this was then-second ECHR case from Chechnya), but she was murdered before the ruling was issued. On June 21, 2007, in the case of Bitiyeva and X v. Russia, the Court ruled that Russian forces were responsible for Bitiyeva's illegal detention, the inhuman and degrading treatment she suffered during detention, and for her subsequent "brutal" death. Russia was ordered by the court to pay €85,000 in damages to Bitiyeva's daughter, living as a refugee in Germany.
