= Vremivka =

Vremivka Времівка
- Village
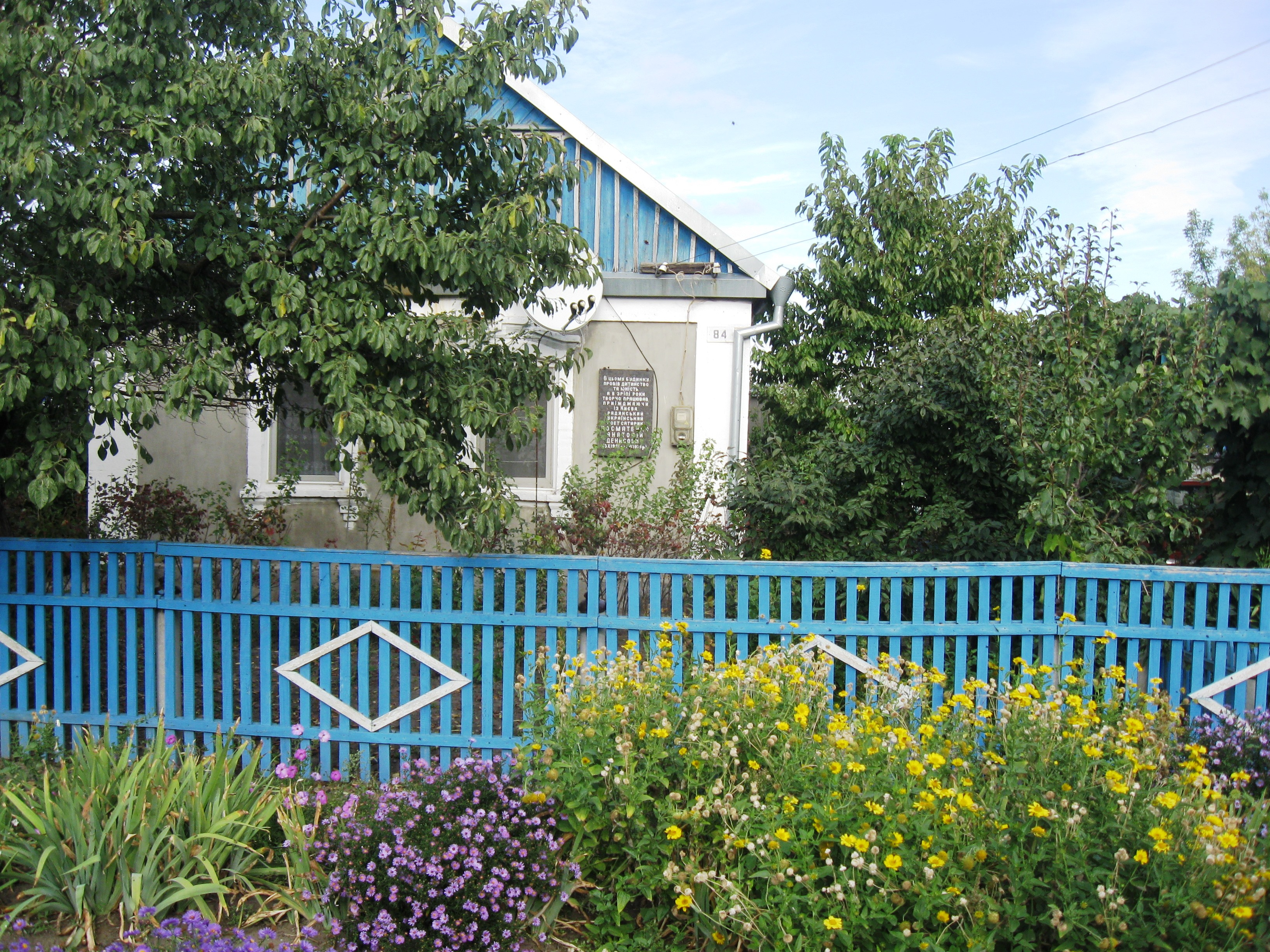

- Location within Donetsk Oblast Location within Ukraine
- Coordinates: 47°50′04″N 36°48′48″E
- Country: Ukraine
- Oblast: Donetsk Oblast
- Raion: Volnovakha Raion
- Hromada: Velyka Novosilka settlement hromada
- Elevation: 106 m (348 ft)

Population
  - Total: 1,229
- Postal code: 85500
- Area code: +380-6243

Vremivka (Ukrainian: Времівка; Russian: Времевка, romanized: Vremyevka) is a village located in Volnovakha Raion, Donetsk Oblast, Ukraine. It belongs to Velyka Novosilka settlement hromada, and is located west of Velyka Novosilka.

== History ==
On 12 June 2023, during the Russian invasion of Ukraine, it was reported that Russian forces and the Ukrainian military were fighting near the village, although not in the village itself, during the Ukrainian counteroffensive.

Russian forces entered into village and captured it in mid-January 2025 amidst an offensive in the area.

== See also ==
- List of villages in Donetsk Oblast
