= Andrei Babitsky =

Russian journalist and war reporter (1964–2022)

- Андрей Бабицкий
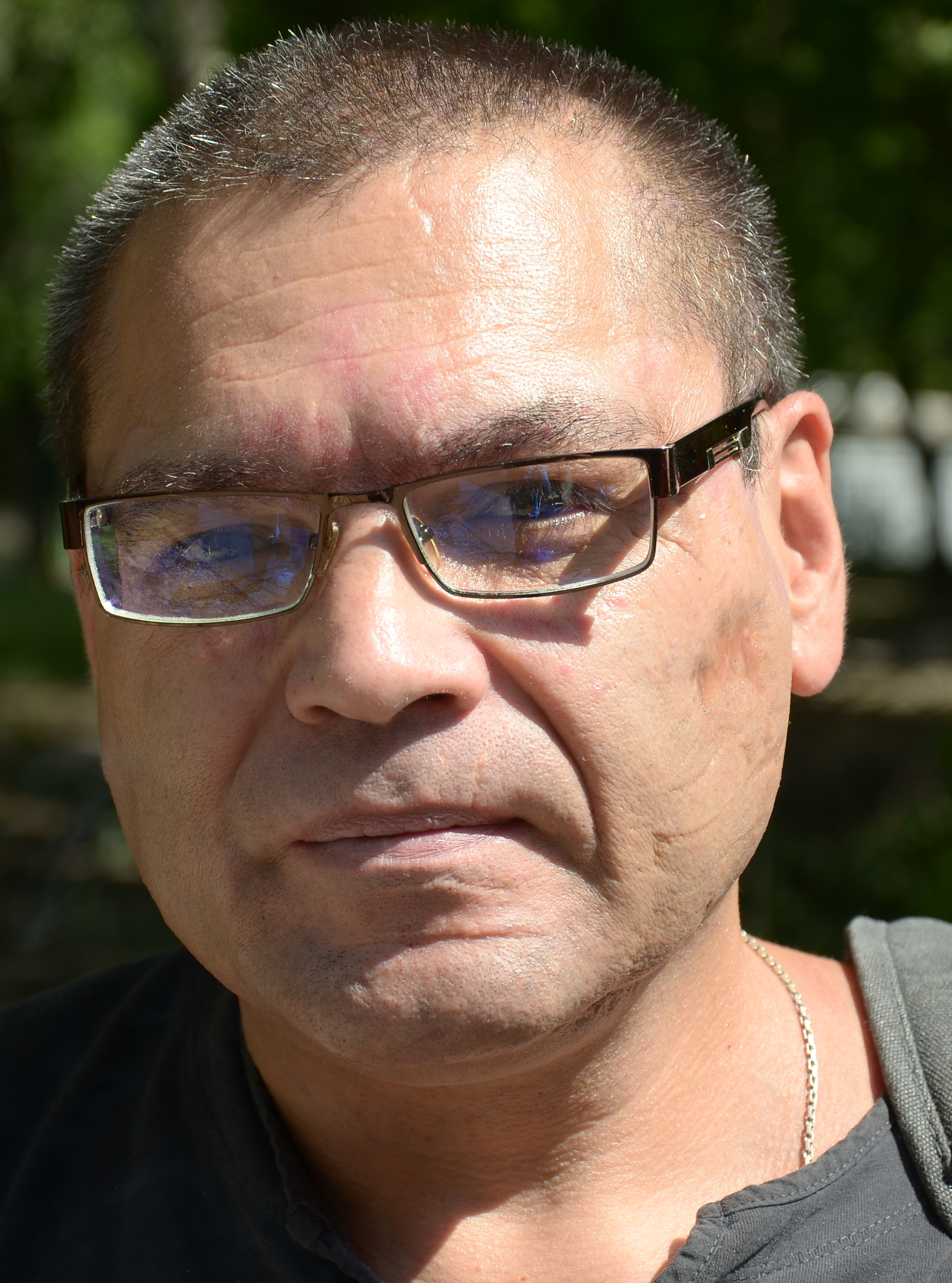
- Babitsky in Donetsk in 2015
- Born: Andrei Maratovich Babitsky; 26 September 1964; Moscow, Russian SFSR, USSR
- Died: 1 April 2022 (aged 57); Donetsk, Ukraine
- Education: Philological Faculty of Moscow State University
- Occupations: Journalist and war reporter

Andrei Maratovich Babitsky (Russian: Андрей Маратович Бабицкий; 26 September 1964 – 1 April 2022) was a Russian journalist and war reporter, who worked for Radio Free Europe/Radio Liberty (RFE/RL) from 1989 to 2014, covering the 1991 August Coup, Civil War in Tajikistan and both the First and Second Chechen Wars from behind Chechen lines. Babitsky's kidnapping by the Russian forces in January–February 2000 during the Second Chechen War attracted attention of international journalists' organisations. His 2005 video interview with Chechen warlord Shamil Basayev was condemned by Russian government, as Basayev was on wanted terrorist list in Russia.

== War correspondent in Chechnya ==
His reporting was somewhat controversial in Russia, as he was often accused of siding with the Chechen rebels. Babitsky once said:

One must say that the Chechens cut throats of soldiers not because they are sadists inclined to treat them with brutality, but in order to make the war more convex, visible, vivid, to reach the public and to explain that a war is actually going on, scary and cruel.

However, according to Mario Corti, head of RFE/RL, Russian service, Babitsky has not shied away from reporting Chechen atrocities and was the first Russian journalist to put the blame for the death of the American disaster relief specialist Fred Cuny on a Chechen warlord.

At the outset of the Russian assault on the Chechen capital Grozny in January 2000 the Russian government announced that there were no civilians left in the city. Babitsky then managed to get into the besieged Grozny and reported under heavy bombing that this was not the case and that civilians did remain in the city. After his last phone contact on 15 January, he disappeared. The Russian officials at first denied that they knew anything about his whereabouts. However, it was leaked to Alexander Yevtushenko, friend of Babitsky and war reporter for Komsomolskaya Pravda, that on 16 January Babitsky had been detained while trying to leave Grozny and since then had been held in the Chernokozovo prison camp by the Russian forces. On 28 January, the authorities admitted to having him in custody since 23 January. As Babitsky's family, friends and colleagues voiced fears for his life and the scandal unfolded, after a personal inquiry by U.S. Secretary of State Madeleine Albright, who was visiting Moscow, Russian Prosecutor General Vladimir Ustinov on 2 February pledged to bring Babitsky to Moscow and release him. However, instead of his release, on 4 February the Kremlin spokesman Sergei Yastrzhembsky announced that on 3 February Babitsky had been handed over to Chechen warlords in exchange for several Russian soldiers held captive by them. "From now on, all federal authorities bear no responsibility for the reporter's fate", Yastrzhembsky added. Chechen rebel authorities, including president Aslan Maskhadov, denied ever having been involved in any such swap. The situation was perceived as one of the first signs of the shrinking tolerance for a free press in Russia under Vladimir Putin, who became acting President of Russia on New Year's Eve. As author Masha Gessen put it, with the story of the prisoner swap, "...Russian troops had treated a journalist--a Russian journalist--as an enemy combatant."

On 10 March 2000, the newspaper Kommersant published an interview with Putin, where he accused Babitsky of treason and collaboration with Chechen warlords and commented:

Here you say that he is a Russian citizen. Well, one has to obey the law of one's country if one counts on being treated according to the law.

On 25 February 2000, Babitsky was arrested in Makhachkala. He was tried for carrying a forged passport, which, he said, had been provided by those holding him, ended up fined in October 2000 but was granted amnesty immediately thereafter.

== Further reporting for Radio Free Europe/Radio Liberty (RFERL) until 2014 dismissal ==
On 2 September 2004, Babitsky was detained by Russian Special Services at Vnukovo airport whilst attempting to get to North Ossetia to report on the school hostage crisis.

On 23 June 2005, Babitsky managed to interview Chechen warlord Shamil Basayev. The interview was first broadcast on ABC on 28 July and incurred the wrath of Russian officials.

Babitsky was living in Prague, Czech Republic where RFE/RL headquarters were located when in 2014 he fell out with Radio Liberty over his advocating the 2014 Russian annexation of Crimea. He voiced the opinion that it was Russia's "undeniable right to stand up for its (Crimea's) inhabitants" and in September of the same year he was dismissed from the radio. Speaking on the war in eastern Ukraine, Babitsky said that:

At that time I felt for the Chechens, because I thought that if these people want to live by their own traditions and move away from Russia then they should be able to. ... It’s the same here. I think Russia is playing a significant role here, but the reasons are not to be found in Russia, they are internal. This is a civil war, where the interests of two parts of Ukraine that consider themselves linked to two cultural traditions are clashing with each other.

While Andrei Babitsky claimed his dismissal was political for his opinions towards Crimea and Ukraine, RFE/RL stated it was due to staff reorganisation; RFERL spokesman, Martins Zvaners, commented that RFE/RL cannot discuss the Babitsky's case, but claimed it was "totally false" that the dismissal was connected with Babitsky's personal views, and that RFE/RL had no bias in coverage of Ukraine.

== Death ==
Babitsky died on 1 April 2022 in Donetsk, Ukraine at the age of 57.
