= Sudan Human Rights Hub =

Civil society organization

Sudan Human Rights Hub (SHRH)
- المركز السوداني لحقوق الإنسان
- Abbreviation: SHRH
- Formation: 2020
- Type: Non-Governmental Organization
- Headquarters: Khartoum, Sudan
- Website: sudanhrh.org

The Sudan Human Rights Hub (Arabic: المركز السوداني لحقوق الإنسان) is a non-profit, non-governmental organization, coordination and resource center for over 40 Sudanese grassroots human rights groups and international partners. Established in 2020 through a collaboration between Project Expedite Justice and the Gisa Group, the Hub aims to support a holistic and inclusive transitional justice process in Sudan. The SHRH is dedicated to establishing a robust human rights framework in Sudan, enabling communities to access justice effectively. It serves as an ecosystem of lawyers, civil society organizations, grassroots community groups, and human rights defenders, collaborating to create and archive important documentation, engage in advocacy and investigations, and "demonstrate that accountability is possible".

== History ==
The SHRH collaborates with various organizations to enhance its impact e.g. Adeela, Sudan Unlimited, Jalca Legal Aid etc.

Ayin Network: to produce the "Sudan Conflict Monitor" detailed reports on human rights conditions in Sudan.

George Mason University: Rothbart and his team have gathered with the help of the Sudan Human Rights Hub witness testimonies, which, when combined with satellite imagery, provide a robust picture of human rights violations in the region.

Women's International League for Peace and Freedom: The SHRH was mentioned in a statement by Niemat Ahmadi at the UN Security Council Open Debate on Conflict-Related Sexual Violence.

C4ADS: In September 2023, Ambassador Beth Van Schaack mentioned the Sudan Shahid map, produced in collaboration with the Centre for Information Resilience (CIR) and the SHRH, in public remarks on the situation in Sudan.

Advocacy and global engagement

The Hub engages in international advocacy, urging bodies like the United Nations Human Rights Council to extend fact-finding missions in Sudan. It also participates in open-source investigations, utilizing satellite imagery and other technologies to document threats to civilians and generate rapid responses to human rights concerns.

== Activities ==
- Sudan Investigates A program that focuses on conducting thorough investigations into human rights violations within Sudan, utilizing both traditional methods and modern technology to gather evidence and support accountability efforts. Since Conflict Observatory now defunct, some of its investigations are still accessible via SHRH website.
- SHRH Archive A comprehensive repository that preserves documentation related to human rights abuses, ensuring that data is maintained for future reference and legal proceedings.
- Learning Resource Platform An educational platform offering resources and training materials to empower human rights defenders and community members with knowledge and skills pertinent to human rights advocacy.
