= Chernokozovo detention center =

Prison in Chechnya, Russia

Chernokozovo SIZO
- Interactive map of Chernokozovo SIZO
- Location: Chernokozovo, Chechnya, Russia; 43.670089°N 45.358381°E
- Status: operational
- Managed by: Ministry of Internal Affairs

Chernokozovo detention center (Russian: Чернокозово СИЗО, Chernokozovo SIZO) is a prison in the village of Chernokozovo, Chechnya, Russia. The detention center is operated by the Ministry of Internal Affairs and currently has the status of penal colony.

Chernokozovo SIZO was notorious during the Second Chechen War, serving as the main component of the "filtration camp" system operated by Russian federal forces. It was the site of reported human rights violations, particularly accusations of widespread arbitrary detention and torture.

== History ==
The Soviet-era maximum-security penitentiary facility at Chernokozovo was closed down during the First Chechen War in December 1994. It was re-opened by the Russian federal forces during the Second Chechen War at the end of 1999, officially as a "temporary reception center for the persons detained on the grounds of vagrancy and begging". In fact, it served as an unofficial prison camp for captured separatist fighters, as well as one of at least four main "filtration camps" (or "filtration points") for male and female civilians (including children) who were either arbitrarily detained as "suspicious persons" at hundreds of checkpoints or just non-selectively rounded-up in their own homes during the mass and indiscriminate "mopping-up" (zachistka) operations and then kept there without any charges. According to official figures, about 10,000 people passed through the "reception center" at Chernokozovo. Among the prisoners was also the RFE/RL journalist Andrei Babitsky, kidnapped by Russian federal forces in Chechnya, who in a statement for the United States House of Representatives said: "Everything that we read about concentration camps of the Stalin period, all that we know about the German camps, all this is present there."

In February 2000, the prison gained worldwide notoriety for prisoner abuse when the reports emerged of prisoners being routinely subjected to human gauntlet beatings, various forms of torture, rape and other abuse, and their families to extortion at the hands of guards (a widespread practice of releasing prisoners, or even handing over their corpses, in exchange for ransom). A number of prisoners died from abuse or have "disappeared" without trace. Afterwards, Russian government engaged in what Amnesty International called a cover-up, before opening the prison for visits by foreign journalists and international observers. Prior to the high-profile visit by the Council of Europe's Committee for the Prevention of Torture, the prison was turned from a "reception center" into a SIZO (investigative isolator) and freshly painted, a new prison staff from the Ministry of Justice were sent to replace the previous guards (who were reportedly contract soldiers), and conditions there improved notably, while torture victims have been relocated to other "filtration points". In October 2000, Human Rights Watch released its 99-page investigative report about Chernokozovo, titled "Welcome to Hell".

Since 2005, Chernokozovo detention center's status is of a "penal colony" for convicts, run by Interior Ministry forces of the local government led by Ramzan Kadyrov, who is personally taking part in its management. Living conditions there reportedly have improved vastly since 2000, however still remained bad (for example, healthy persons are kept together with tuberculosis patients) and reports of continued beatings, torture and other abuse have persisted.

== ECHR rulings ==
In 2007, in the first ruling on a torture case from Chechnya, the European Court of Human Rights (ECHR) found Russia guilty of torturing the Chitayev brothers, Adam and Arbi, at Chernokozovo during their detention between April and October 2000, finding "that their suffering was particularly serious and cruel". Among various other forms of abuse, the brothers were subjected to electric shocks, suffocated with a cellophane bag and a gas mask, and had parts of their skin torn away with pliers.

in 2003, Zura Bitiyeva, a female former Chernokozovo detainee who had filed a case with the Court relating to her torture, was summarily executed together with her family during a raid by a group of unidentified masked men. In a 2008 ruling, the Court ruled that Bitiyeva's illegal detention in Chernokozovo and the inhuman and degrading treatment she suffered during detention had been in "total disregard of the requirement of lawfulness", and blamed the Russian state for her and her family's subsequent murder.
