= Malynivka rural hromada =

Malynivka rural hromada Малинівська сільська громада
- Hromada
- Interactive map of Malynivka rural hromada
- Country: Ukraine
- Oblast: Zaporizhzhia
- Raion: Polohy

Area
  - Total: 377.6 km^{2} (145.8 sq mi)

Population
  - Total: 3,205
  - Density: 8.488/km^{2} (21.98/sq mi)
- Website: malynivka.gromada.org.ua

Malynivka rural hromada (Ukrainian: Малинівська сільська громада) is a hromada of Ukraine, located in Polohy Raion, Zaporizhzhia Oblast. Its administrative center is the village of Malynivka.

== Settlements ==
The hromada contains 13 villages:

- Levadne
- Liubymivka
- Malynivka
- Novodarivka
- Novoukrainske
- Novozlatopil
- Okhotnyche
- Olhivske
- Poltavka
- Pryiutne
- Remivka
- Stepove
- Vyshneve
