= Rozdolne, Volnovakha Raion, Donetsk Oblast =

Rozdolne Роздольне
- Rural settlement
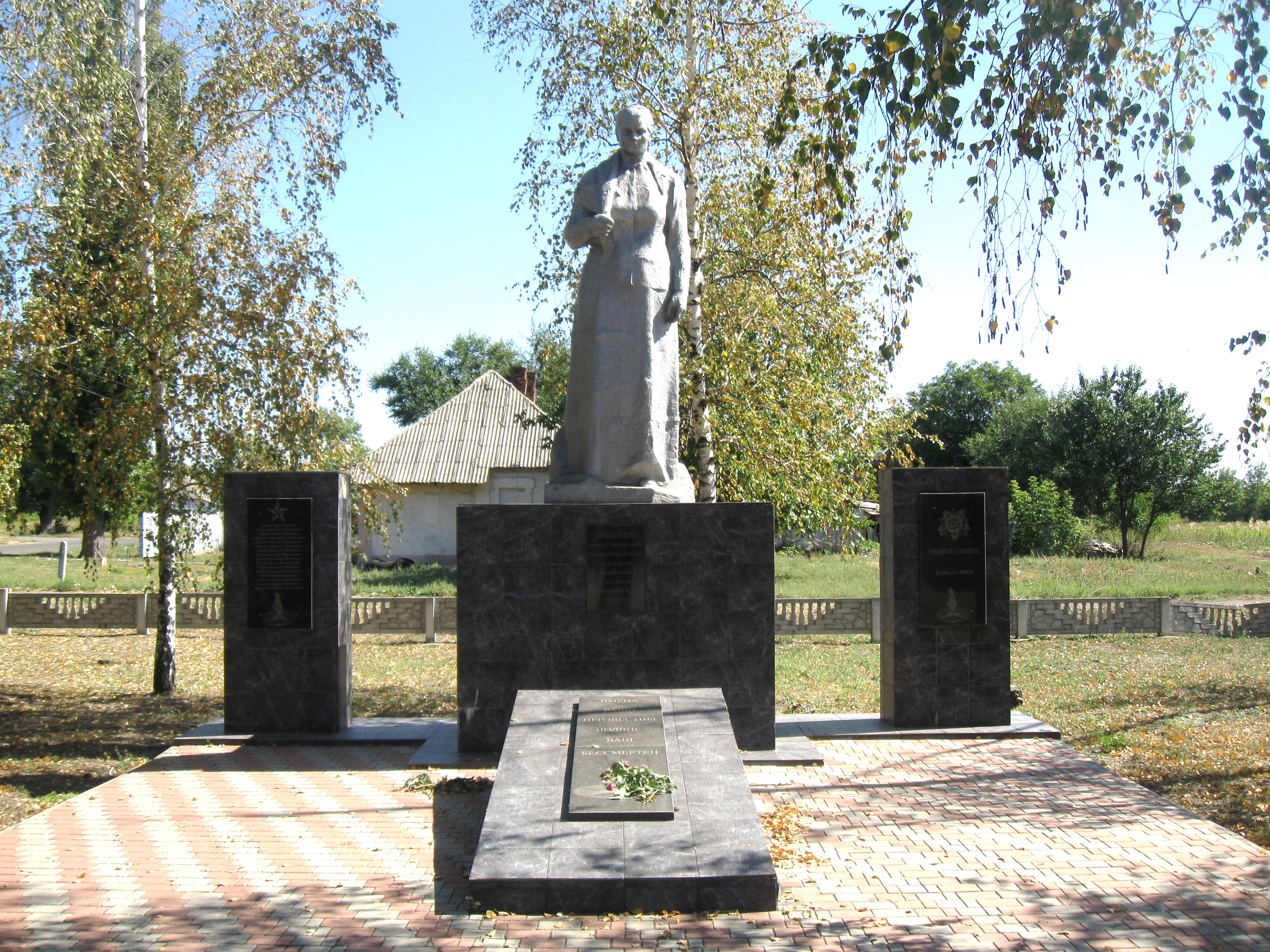
- A World War II monument in Rozdolne

- Rozdolne shown within Ukraine Rozdolne shown within Donetsk
- Coordinates: 47°54′14″N 36°54′49″E
- Country: Ukraine
- Oblast: Donetsk Oblast
- Raion: Volnovakha Raion
- Hromada: Velyka Novosilka settlement hromada
- Elevation: 151 m (495 ft)

Population (2001)
  - Total: 1,120
- Postal code: 85532
- Area code: +380 6243

Rozdolne (Ukrainian: Роздольне) is a rural settlement in Velyka Novosilka settlement hromada, Volnovakha Raion, Donetsk Oblast, Ukraine. The population was 1,120 at the 2001 Ukrainian census.

== History ==
During the Russo-Ukrainian War and the Russian invasion of Ukraine, the settlement became a target of Russian forces as part of their offensive in the area towards Velyka Novosilka. Russian forces pressed on the village and started storming it on the 23 November 2024, along with the fortified settlement Velyka Novosilka on 24 November.

Russian sources claimed that the settlement had been captured on 26 and 27 November. The occupation of the village was confirmed by DeepStateMap.Live on 29 November.

== Demographics ==
According to the 2001 Ukrainian census, the population of the village was 1,120, of which 32.41% stated Ukrainian to be their native language, 66.52% stated their native language to be Russian, and 0.98% to be Armenian.
