= Conflict Observatory =

Non-governmental organization

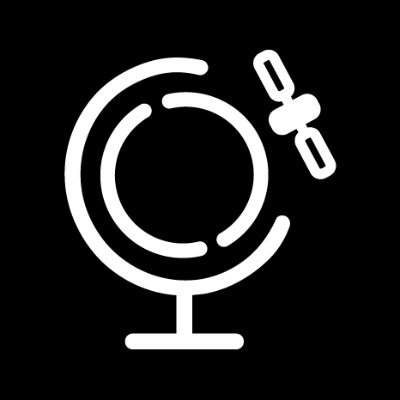
- Logo of the Conflict Observatory
- Formation: May 17, 2022; 4 years ago
- Founder: United States Department of State
- Purpose: As an independent consortium, Conflict Observatory uses open-source information to produce high-quality documentation on potential human rights violations and international crimes to increase public awareness and enable accountability. Their values include collaboration, independence, integrity, equity, and innovation.
- Location: United States
- Official language: English
- Budget: $6 million (USD) (2022)
- Website: web.archive.org/web/20241208180019/https://hub.conflictobservatory.org/portal/apps/sites/#/conflict-observatory

The Conflict Observatory is an American non-governmental organization that documents, verifies, and reports on war crimes occurring in Ukraine and Sudan. It publicizes evidence of Russian war crimes and other atrocities in the Russian invasion of Ukraine, and mass atrocities and genocidal activities conducted by the Rapid Support Forces in Darfur. The organization uses open-source intelligence research methods and commercial satellite imagery and data to produce reports that meet legal standards for use in international accountability efforts. Founded in 2022, the observatory was funded, but not governed, by the U.S. Department of State's Bureau of Conflict and Stabilization Operations, until funding was cut by the Trump administration through Elon Musk's DOGE organization.

== History ==
The Conflict Observatory was developed by the United States Department of State's Bureau of Conflict and Stabilization Operations at the outset of the Russian invasion of Ukraine and was officially announced by State Department press secretary Ned Price on May 17, 2022. In 2023, the observatory’s efforts expanded to include the civil war in Sudan.

The Conflict Observatory is not a repository of “breaking news.” Instead, it follows strict guidelines and protocols to ensure documentation is accurate and accessible to all audiences. The consortium brings together subject matter experts in human rights, humanitarian law, communication, and open source and geospatial data analytics. None of the data the Observatory uses and disseminates is classified.

=== Defunding by DOGE ===
In March 2025, Yale University reported that the Trump administration had cut all funding to the Yale Humanitarian Research Lab via the U.S. DOGE Service Temporary Organization led by Elon Musk. The lab is a subset of the Conflict Observatory working to establish the whereabouts of Ukrainian children kidnapped by Russian forces and deported into the Russian adoption system. The deportation of children is a war crime, and the International Criminal Court has formally accused Russia of employing the practice in Ukraine, indicting senior officials.

The Conflict Observatory's website was taken offline following the defunding by DOGE.

== Reports ==
The Ukraine Conflict Observatory has been documenting and analyzing Russia-perpetrated war crimes and other alleged atrocities in Ukraine. These crimes include the destruction of critical infrastructure, forced deportations, forced passportization, extrajudicial killings, and destruction of cultural heritage sites.

The Sudan Conflict Observatory has been monitoring the ongoing civil war in Sudan by documenting the destruction of critical infrastructure, disruption to humanitarian aid, and alleged crimes against civilians. Since Conflict Observatory now defunct, some of its investigations are still accessible via Sudan Human Rights Hub website.

Records of reports were maintained on the Conflict Observatory website (ConflictObservatory.org) and publication is announced via Instagram and X. While these executive briefs are made available to the public, the full data sets are closed source, though certain organizations and international investigators may access the full contents of the database.
