= Battle of Komsomolskoye =

2000 battle in the Second Chechen War

- Part of the Second Chechen War
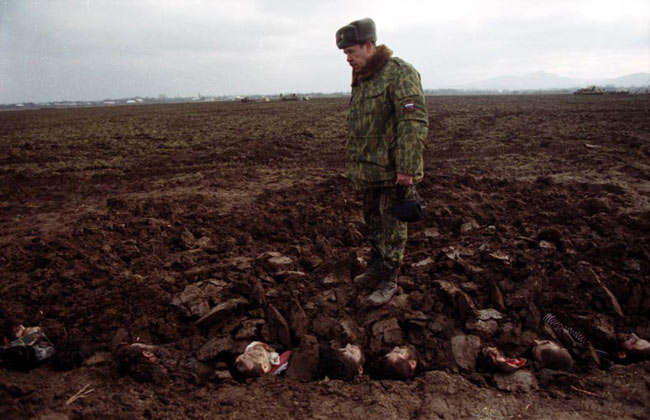
Date	6–24 March 2000 (2 weeks and 4 days)
Location	Komsomolskoye (Saadi-Kotar), Chechnya 43°3′37″N 45°36′14″E
Result	Russian victory: Komsomolskoye massacre

Belligerents
Russian Federation	Chechen Republic of Ichkeria

Commanders and leaders
(Russia) Valery Gerasimov; (Russia) Mikhail Labunets; (Russia) Mikhail Revenko †; (Russia) Magomed Kakiyev	Ruslan Gelayev; Taus Baguraev; Khamzat Idigov †; Khamzat Bataev (executed)

Strength
Per Russia: 1,000+	Per Chechens: 800 Per Russia: 300–1,500

Casualties and losses
Per Russia: 50+ killed 300+ wounded Per Chechens: 400 killed 37+ AFVs destroyed	Per Russia: 519–800 killed 88 captured (~70 executed)

The Battle of Komsomolskoye took place in Chechnya during the Second Chechen War. Beginning on 6 March 2000 and lasting until 24 March 2000, it resulted in the deaths of more than 50 Russian soldiers and hundreds of Chechen militants over the course of two weeks of siege warfare. An unknown number of civilians were killed in the fighting as well. The fighting resulted in the destruction of most of the Chechen separatist units commanded by Ruslan Gelayev. Scores of Chechens were taken prisoner by the Russian military, and only a few survived the ensuing Komsomolskoye massacre. Marked by fierce urban combat, the Battle of Komsomolskoye was the bloodiest of the entire conflict.

== Engagement ==
Komsomolskoye (Chechen: Saadi-Kotar) (not to be confused with Komsomolskoye in the Gudermessky District, near the border with Dagestan), a village of some 5,000 residents before the war, was a southern suburb of the Chechen capital of Grozny, and hometown of the autonomous Chechen separatist commander Ruslan Gelayev, who was operating in Shatoysky and Itum-Kalinsky Districts. A large column of exhausted and hungry fighters from Gelayev's detachment entered the village on 4 March 2000. The fighters were attempting to break through the cordon set up by Russian forces around the Argun river gorge following the fall of Grozny in February. They were apparently deceived by Arbi Barayev, who had promised to evacuate their wounded with buses, but in actuality lured Gelayev and his troops into a well-prepared federal ambush.

Once in Komsomolskoye, the column was blocked by Russian Internal Troops and OMON and SOBR police commandos from Voronezh, Irkutsk and Kursk, who were soon joined by the military. The village was then subjected to heavy shelling and aerial bombing. Russian spokesmen at first said only 25–30 fighters were in the village, asserting that the guerrillas could no longer field large units, but they later said it was a group of up to 1,500. Some fighters succeeded in getting out of Komsomolskoye in small groups of around ten fighters each. Gelayev escaped on 10 March. Only a handful of those who remained in the village survived the battle or the captivity. More than 300 fighters were killed in minefields around the village. According to the Russians, 17 soldiers were killed in an ambush on the second day; civilians were brought in and ordered to bring back seven soldiers who could not be evacuated.

The Russian government claimed that the village was heavily fortified. However, according to Los Angeles Times interviews with Chechen survivors of the battle, the trapped rebels, many of whom were injured or frostbitten, could not fortify the village or find decent shelter. In one incident, 50 wounded fighters were killed in a direct hit on the basement where they were taking shelter. Survivors said they were starving and freezing, and had inadequate arms and ammunition. One said he was the only survivor out of a group of nine that attempted to break out; the others were all killed by mines. They said that several desperate comrades had feigned surrender, only to blow themselves and their captors up with concealed hand grenades.

According to Human Rights Watch and Memorial, more than 2,000 civilians were stranded in no man's land for three days during the battle. On the second day, the Russian forces said that women and children could leave, but they were discouraged to do so by Chechen troops, possibly aiming to use them as human shields. This resulted in civilian casualties during the subsequent hostilities. Up to 100 civilians, mainly elderly, disabled, or wounded, were trapped in the village and may have been killed in the course of the battle. A number of male civilians were singled out, beaten, and taken to an improvised detention center in Urus-Martan for torture, including to the death. Civilian survivors said refugees were allowed to return to the village for one hour to take their belongings, but were killed during renewed Russian bombing. Others related witnessing organized looting, with "truckloads of booty" being hauled off by Russian forces. They stated they were able to evacuate from the battle zone after a group of pro-Moscow Chechen militia policemen forced the Russian checkpoint at gunpoint to let them pass. Abdula Itslayev, the head of the neighbouring village of Goyskoye, said that there were heavy civilian casualties and claimed to know whole families who had been wiped out.

After four days of around-the-clock artillery bombardment, with fighter-bomber air strikes being conducted every five to 10 minutes including the use of thermobaric weapons (TOS-1 multiple rocket launchers), the storming of Komsomolskoye began. Russian special forces spearheaded two dozen tanks and infantry with armored personnel carriers. On 8 March, acting commander of the federal forces in Chechnya General Gennady Troshev said that Gelayev's forces would be destroyed by the next day. By 10 March, the Russians said they were still encountering determined resistance from between 300 and 700 Chechen fighters. A short ceasefire to collect the wounded was negotiated on 14 March. On 15 March, the deputy commander of the Western Group of federal forces in charge of equipment and armament, Colonel Mikhail Revenko, was killed by a grenade while trying to leave a disabled tank. He was named posthumously as a Hero of the Russian Federation. Two Russian Interior Ministry generals came under sniper fire but were not harmed. Russian servicemen spoke of suffering "colossal losses", describing the helicopters carrying wounded soldiers leaving Komsomolskoye as being "like buses in rush hour"; one officer saw four helicopters carrying dead bodies on one day.

By 17 March, Chechen resistance had driven back Russian forces sent in to "mop up" the now-flattened village, so the Russians initiated a further artillery bombardment. In one friendly fire incident, a Russian tank opened fire on the SOBR group from Irkutsk, killing three. The BBC noted that the Russian high command said the rebels "will be definitively destroyed today", a pledge the local commanders had made the week before. On the night of 19–20 March, the Russians claimed 46 fighters, including a field commander, were killed during the last reported break-out attempt. They also reported that Lieutenant-Colonel Alexander Zhukov, head of the search and rescue service of the North Caucasian Military District and Hero of Russia, had been rescued from Chechen captivity. Already injured, he was wounded by four more bullets when caught in crossfire. According to Interfax, by this time more than 50 federal service members had been killed and more than 300 wounded. The next day, the Russians raised their flag over what was left of the village, and 76 fighters (including two women) surrendered. At this point about 150 rebels still remained holed up with no escape route. On 24 March, Russian defence minister Marshal Igor Sergeyev said that the Russian troops "cleared" the ruins of stragglers and snipers. According to a surviving Chechen prisoner interviewed by Memorial, wounded Chechens were systematically grenaded or burned in shelters and executed after surrendering.

== Aftermath ==
The outcome of the siege was considered a major disaster for the Chechen rebels, of which the Russians said more than 700 had died in or near the village. Some of the corpses found by the Ministry of Emergency Situations burial teams had their ears, noses, and fingers cut off; mutilated and bound corpses were also witnessed by a visiting Newsweek correspondent. Officially 88 Chechen prisoners were taken, but most of them then disappeared.

Komsomolskoye was destroyed by the bombardment. The village, described by one journalist as "looking like a pile of shattered matchsticks—not a single building was left intact," was strewn with rotting corpses and wrecked T-80 tanks and armoured personnel carriers. On 29 March, territorial forces of the Ministry of Emergency Situations of Chechnya announced they had found and buried the remains of 552 Chechens and 628 large animals. They located and defused 4,622 pieces of unexploded ordnance. Russian investigative journalist Anna Politkovskaya compared the events in Komsomolskoye to the Khatyn massacre and called it "a village that no longer exists", as the battle left behind "a monstrous conglomerate of burnt houses, ruins, and new graves at the cemetery." Close to 150 families remained in the village, but they were practically all homeless and lived in improvised huts. Politkovskaya talked with a man "thin as a Buchenwald prisoner", ill from tuberculosis, whose teenage son angrily confronted her. He asked: "Why was the whole country stirred when the Kursk sailors were dying, but when they were shooting people leaving Komsomolskoe right on the field for several days, you kept silent?" As of 2004, most former residents still lived outside the village, mostly in the Urus-Martanovsky District, waiting for compensation for their destroyed houses.

Gelayev and some of his men escaped the town, but his ability to influence events in Chechnya was severely undermined. He spent most of the rest of his life across the border in neighbouring Georgia. He also conducted a personal campaign of revenge against Barayev and his men.
