= Filtration camp system in Chechnya =

Russian concentration camps

Filtration camps, also known as concentration camps, were camps used by the Russian forces for their mass internment centers during the First Chechen War and then again during the Second Chechen War.

== "Filtration" system ==
The term "filtration point" re-appeared during the First Chechen War as name of the facilities illegally created for the purpose of holding the persons detained by the federal forces in the course of an operation "to restore constitutional order" in Chechen Republic territory in 1994–1996. During the Second Chechen War, beginning in 1999, some of the "filtration" facilities got legitimate status of investigative isolators (SIZO) subordinated to the Ministry of Justice and temporary detention isolators (IVS) subordinated to the Interior Ministry, but with an unclear legal status and no apparent basis in the criminal code of the Russian Federation.

According to the Russian human rights group Memorial, "by the most modest estimations", the overall number of those having passed through the established and ad hoc "filtration points" reaches at least 200,000 people (out of Chechnya's population of less than one million), of whom "practically all" were subjected to beatings and torture, and some were summarily executed. According to Memorial, the purpose of the "filtration" system in Chechnya, besides being part of the general state terror system for suppression and intimidation of the population, was enforced recruitment of a network of informers, and was characterised by its non-selectivity, that is by arbitrary arrests and mass detentions of innocent people.

In October 2000, Human Rights Watch (HRW) published its 99-page investigative report "Welcome to Hell", detailing how Russian troops have detained thousands of Chechens, "many of them were detained arbitrarily, with no evidence of wrongdoing. Guards at detention centers systematically beat Chechen detainees, some of whom have also been raped or subjected to other forms of torture. Most were released only after their families paid large bribes to Russian officials." HRW noted that despite the European Union-sponsored United Nations Commission on Human Rights resolution urging Russia to launch a national commission of inquiry that would establish accountability for abuse, the Russian authorities did not launch any "credible and transparent effort to investigate these abuses and bring the perpetrators to justice."

"Chechens who do not have proper identity papers, who share a surname with a Chechen commander, who are thought to have relatives who are fighters, or who simply 'look' like fighters, continue to be detained and abused on a daily basis in their communities or at Chechnya’s hundreds of checkpoints. Many 'disappear' for months as Russian officials keep them in incommunicado detention. Some are eventually released when relatives pay a bribe. Others never come back. (...) Chechens are so commonly detained at checkpoints within Chechnya and along Chechnya’s borders with other parts of Russia that many have gone to great lengths to avoid travel altogether, even when they need to flee active fighting. (...) Men are regularly beaten during the detention process, and frequently subjected to taunts and threats. On occasion, women have been raped at checkpoints after being detained. (...) Russian forces commonly rounded up and detained groups of Chechen men in 'mop-ups,' or operations to flush out or detain rebels and their collaborators, following the takeover of Chechen communities. Russian forces also carry out arrest sweeps and house-to-house searches after guerrilla ambushes or other attacks. In some cases, the male population of a village was rounded up, taken to an empty field, and subjected to beatings while Russian officials looked for suspected rebels. Those rounded up in mop-up operations are treated especially harshly: Russian forces beat them mercilessly, sometimes to death, and have summarily executed others."

— Human Rights Watch, October 2000

== "Filtration points" in the Second Chechen War ==
One of main, and the best known, filtration camps in Chechnya was the Chernokozovo detention center, set up in a former prison in 1999. Chernokozovo was subject of a significant attention in 2000, as well as at least two illegal detention and torture related rulings by the European Court of Human Rights (the cases of the Chitayev brothers in 2007 and of Zura Bitiyeva in 2008, the latter also including the subsequent summary execution of her and her family).

The first camp in Grozny, the capital of Chechnya, opened in January 1995. Russian forces beat and tortured the Chechens held there. Many were used by Russian forces as human shields in combat and as hostages to be exchanged for Russian soldiers captured by Chechen fighters.

In 2000, Amnesty International identified the following "filtration camps": the detention facility in Kadi-Yurt, a makeshift detention facility in a school in Urus-Martan, and other makeshift camps in various locations in Chechnya, including at a fruit warehouse in Tolstoy-Yurt, at a poultry processing plant and the basement of the "Chekhkar" café in Chiri-Yurt, and in the capital Grozny. The facilities outside of Chechnya included the prison hospital and the SIZO at Pyatigorsk in Stavropol Territory.

According to Memorial, other long-term "filtration points" run by federal forces included the notorious "Titanic" facility located between Aleroy and Tsentoroy, the site of a "disappearance" of many people. Illegal prisons were created at the places of deployment of military units or special units of the Ministry of Interior and the prisoners kept in them were not officially registered anywhere neither as being detained. The largest and best known of them was located at the military base at Khankala, where many prisoners were held in the holes dug in the ground. In addition, temporary "filtration camps" were set up in the open fields or in abandoned premises on the outskirts of the towns and villages in the course of numerous "mopping-up" (zachistka) special operations.

In 2006, Russia's human rights groups produced a documentary evidence of a secret torture center in the basement of a former school for deaf children in Oktyabrsokye district of Grozny, which they alleged had been used by a unit of the Russian special police OMON that had been stationed nearby during the early 2000s to hold, torture and kill hundreds of people, whose bodies were then dumped throughout Chechnya. A member of the unit, Sergei Lapin was convicted in 2005 of torturing Chechen student Zelimkhan Murdalov, one of the "disappeared" who remains unaccounted for). Activists said they collected the evidence just in time, before the building housing the cellar was demolished in an apparent crude cover-up attempt.

== See also ==
- Russian war crimes
- Mass graves in Chechnya
- Russian filtration camps of Ukrainians
- Nazi concentration camps
