= Decentralisation in Ukraine =

Government reforms in Ukraine since 2014

Decentralisation in Ukraine is a series of reforms to give additional power and resources to local authorities. This process was intended to advance regional development and border reform. Successful steps have been taken. Angela Merkel, Georg Milbradt and Hugues Mingarelli praised the reforms. In opinion of financial experts (PhD Yevhen Marynchak) decentralizing public funds of territorial communities, the state should use real instruments that can help create a strong regional economy on the territory.

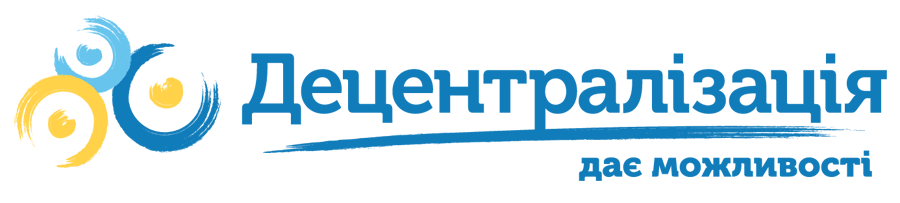
logo of Decentralisation in Ukraine

== Reforms ==
The decentralization reform had the following provisions:

- Strengthen local government;
- Change administrative-territorial structure;
- Consolidate the “principle of omnipresence” (local governments are defined by lands on the territory of settlements);
- Empower local government with sufficient powers and resources;
- Reflect historical, economic, environmental and cultural characteristics when planning the development of United territorial communities;
- Transfer roles that local governments can perform to local authorities;

The reform consists of three key components:

- Reform of the territorial organisation of power
- Reform of local self-government
- Reform of regional policy

== History ==
After Ukraine gained independence in 1991, the state increased local/regional government powers. In 1997 Ukraine ratified the European Charter of Local Self-Government, and adopted regulatory acts that established such powers. However, discussions concerning larger scale organisation as a rule concerned the distribution of powers at the national level.

Following Euromaidan in 2014, the new government launched a national project "Decentralisation" (Ukrainian: Національний проект "Децентралізація"), on 1 April. The government of Volodymyr Groysman identified support for decentralisation as one of its priorities.

== Results ==
During the reform, local budget revenues grew from ₴68.6 billion in 2014 to ₴146.6 billion in 2016. By the end of 2017, local budget revenues had reached ₴170.7 billion. In addition, amalgamated hromadas became more active in the process of budget formation: during the first 10 months of 2017, amalgamated hromadas increased their own revenues by 80%, while national revenues grew by only 31.8%. In addition, per capita development expenditures in January-September 2017 increased by 225% compared to 2016 (for example: in communities without amalgamated hromada, growth was only 50%).

From 2014 to 2017, state support for the development of amalgamated hromadas and their infrastructure increased from ₴0.5 billion up to ₴14.9 billion.

== International support ==
Donor agencies, embassies and multilateral organisations are financing and implementing programs and decentralization projects via a Donor Board.

The following projects and organisations are very active:

- U-LEAD with Europe Programme – multi-donor action of the European Union and its Member States Denmark, Estonia, Germany, Poland and Sweden, implemented by GIZ (German development agency) and Sida (agency of the Swedish Ministry for Foreign Affairs)
- DESPRO – Swiss-Ukrainian Project, funded by the Swiss Confederation through SDC and implemented by Skat
- USAID-funded DOBRE program
- Joint UNDP/EU Project – “Community Based Approach to Local Development”

== See also ==
- Official website of the reform
