= Huliaipole Raion =

Former subdivision of Zaporizhzhia Oblast, Ukraine

Huliaipole Raion Гуляйпільський район
- Raion
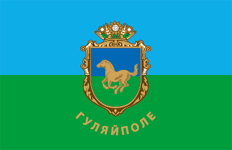
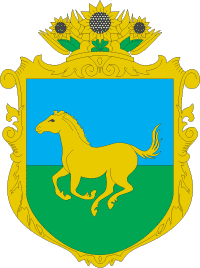
- Flag Coat of arms

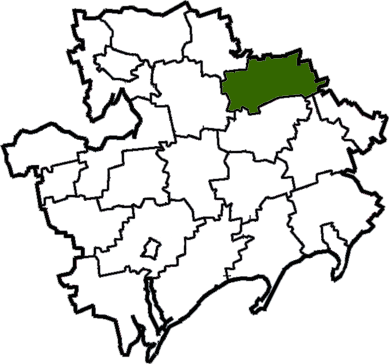
- Coordinates: 47°42′44.72″N 36°17′20.43″E
- Country: Ukraine
- Oblast: Zaporizhzhia Oblast
- Established: 1923
- Disestablished: 18 July 2020
- Admin. center: Huliaipole
- Subdivisions: List: 1 — city councils; 1 — settlement councils; 18 — rural councils; Number of localities: 1 — cities; 1 — urban-type settlements; 55 — villages; — rural settlements

Government
  - Governor: Oleksandr Gura

Area
  - Total: 1,300 km^{2} (500 sq mi)

Population (2020)
  - Total: 25,337 ▼
  - Density: 19/km^{2} (50/sq mi)
- Time zone: UTC+02:00 (EET)
  - Summer (DST): UTC+03:00 (EEST)
- Postal index: 70200—70245
- Area code: +380 6145
- Website: http://gprda.gov.ua/?id=56

Huliaipole Raion (Ukrainian: Гуляйпільський район) was one of raions (districts) of Zaporizhzhia Oblast in southern Ukraine. The administrative center of the raion was the town of Huliaipole. The raion was abolished on 18 July 2020 as part of the administrative reform of Ukraine, which reduced the number of raions in Zaporizhzhia Oblast from 20 to 5. The area of Huliaipole Raion was merged into Polohy Raion. The last estimate of the raion population was 25,337 (2020 est.)
