= Nikolay Kobozev =

Nikolay Stepanovich Kobozev
- Никола́й Степа́нович Ко́бозев
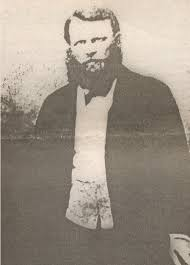
- Nikolay Kobozev in the 1850s.

1st mayor (gorodskoy golova) of Berdiansk

honorary hereditary citizen
- In office 1841–1857; 1860–1862
- Appointed by: elected
- Monarch: Nicholas I of Russia
- Governor-General: Prince Michael Vorontsov
- Preceded by: office created
- Succeeded by: Konstantin Konstantinov
- Monarch: Alexander II of Russia
- Governor-General: Nicholas Annenkov
- Governor-General: Count Alexander Stroganov

Personal details
- Born: Nikolay Stepanovich Kobozev; 6 December 1793 Bakhmut, Yekaterinoslav Governorate, Russian Empire
- Died: 2 March 1866 (aged 72) Berdiansk, Russian Empire
- Spouse: Anna Ivanovna
- Children: no issue
- Occupation: merchant, fishing industrialist
- Awards: Order of St. Anne, 3rd class

Nikolay Stepanovich Kobozev (Russian: Николай Степанович Ко́бозев; also spelled: Кобызев, Кобезев, Кобзев; (6 December 1793 – 2 March 1866)) was one of the founders of Berdiansk, and its first mayor. He was a merchant of the 1st Guild (since 1841), a fishing magnate, and a hereditary honorary citizen of Berdiansk since 1851.

== Background ==
Nikolay Stepanovich Kobozev was born on 6 December 1793, in Bakhmut (now, Ukraine) to Stefan Vasilyevich Kobozev, a merchant of the 3rd Guild and a fishing industrialist descended from the Kursk branch of the Kobuzev noble family. His ancestor, Naum Ivanov syn Kobozev (Kobyzev), a gorodovoy Boyar scion, was mentioned in the Kursk gentry list (Razbornaya Desyatnya) of 1636 with the land allotment (oklad) of 150 chets (about 75 hectares). Naum's son, Danila Naumov syn Kobozev, was mentioned in the Kursk book of troop inspection (Smotrennaya Kniga) in 1652. He became a cannoneer (pushkar). After 1687, his son, Grigory, served as a cannoneer for his father due to the latter's illness. Grigory's brother, Minay, moved to Belgorod. Minay's grandson, Ivan Nikiforov syn Kobozev (1713 – 1788) became the first merchant in the lineage. His grandson, Stefan Vasilyev syn Kobozev (b. 1772), Nikolay's father, moved to Bakhmut. From Bakhmut, his father started to develop a fishing, wheat farming and vinery business in the Northern Azov region. He acquired a fishery near Nogaisk after the city's founding in 1821. Then he expanded his business to the area of the Berda River where the future city of Berdiansk was to be founded. Nikolay's father had 12 boats and 23 seine nets. He also owned a large amount of land where he grew wheat for export.

== Berdiansk ==
=== City founding ===
Since the early 19th century the Russian Empire had plans to build a port in the Northern Azov region to develop international trade. Originally, the port was suggested on the sandspit at the village of Obetochnoe, near the city of Nogaisk, founded in 1821. The village belonged to Count Vasily Orlov-Denisov. The results of an investigations of the site were submitted to Admiral Aleksey Greig, who sent captain, later counter-admiral, Nikolay Dmitrievich Kritski to study the area. However, he reported that Nogaysk area was inferior to the bay of the Berda River.

In the early 19th century, the area near the Berdiansk bay belonged to merchants Ivan Chetverikov and Nikolay's father, Stephan Kobozev. In 1816 they received the right for exclusive fishing there and salt extraction in the local saline lakes.

In 1825, still a merchant of the 3rd Guild, Nikolay Kobozev started construction of a private wooden quay that was opened with a ceremony on 1 July 1830. He attracted a great deal of publicity and invited the city governor of Kerch Ivan Stempkowski, and provincial Saint-Petersburg newspapers to the ceremony. Simultaneously, the authorities gave land near the Bay of Berdiansk for a public quay, which was opened on 12 January 1835 with Kobozev's participation. The next year the first foreign ship entered the Bay of Berdiansk. In 1833 Kobozev put up a wooden post with a light to serve as a beacon. The modern stone Lower Berdiansk Lighthouse was built in 1838 under the leadership of the Italian merchant from Kerch Carlo Tomasini.

In 1841 Kobozev was elected the city's first mayor (gorodskoy golova was an elected head in the Russian Empire). Berdyansk was part of the Kerch-Enykale city governorate, which, represented by Kerch-Enikale city governor, ran the state bodies of the city and surrounding territory. Gorodskoy golova was the leader of the city duma and was to manage social affairs of the city. The office seat of gorodskoy golova was in city ratusha (lit.: rathouse, city hall). Alongside, gorodskoy golova, Berdyansk had the office of city port's head.

Before Nikolay Kobozev's election in 1841 the area of the prospective city was made of a few fisherman's huts and a custom officer's shelter. In his diaries, Titular councillor Vasily Kryzhanovsky left an account of what the place was like when Governor General Mikhail Vorontsov came there to officially open the port of Berdiansk and the customs office in 1836:

It was January 30, 1836 ... there was no single church in Berdiansk then, just a preaching house with a thatch roof, put up at the square where there is now the cathedral; Nikolay Stepanovich Kobozev was the first citizen of the town; he was no older than forty; his wife was Anna Ivanovna. As of now, it has been his entire family. No other notable man — all peasants. In other words, it was a true rural locality: no foreigner, no stone building; the entire town was made of thatched huts. Even Kobozev himself owned a small house where he received Count Vorontsov'.

Kobozev remained in office until 1857. During his first term he built the first city's stone houses. He was re-elected in 1860. He remained active in the city for his entire life that he dedicated to the city's development.

During his time in office the city went through a radical transformation. From 1837 to 1864, the number of foreign ships entering the Bay of Berdiansk rose by 3.5 times, while wheat export grew by 11.5. In the eight years since 1830, the population of Berdiansk increased 15 fold. As early as in 1840 the city had 14 foreign offices. A very telling remark concerning Kobozev's accomplishments in the development of Berdiansk was made by A. Skalkovsky: "...a poor marina has now turned into a remarkable marketplace named Berdiansk".

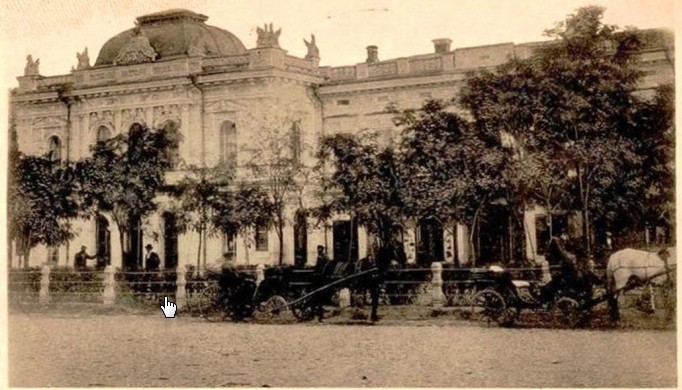
Berdiansk Winter Theater in 1900-1905.

He built the city cemetery and the Saint Nicolas church (no longer in existence) at his own expense. He was one of the participants in the construction of the Berdiansk Cathedral of the Ascension and the city park. In 1852 he built two stone houses in Yeysk— one for an orphanage and the other for the police.

At his own expense, Kobozev built the famous Winter Theater, that was badly damaged during the WWII. It was opened on 24 April 1849. Initially, he planned a residence there, however, for some reason, he decided to rent the building and it was later turned into a theater. In 1861 it housed the first theatrical performance. Because of his enormous debts, the Winter Theater was given away to the city by his brothers after Kobozev's death. In 1943, during retreat German troops put the theater on fire. In 1960 the remains of the theater's building were eventually removed.

In 1852 Berdiansk suffered from a vast flood. It was decided to construct a breakwater. However, due to the Crimean War of 1853 – 1856 the building project was put off until the 1860s. Kobozev was the main contractor for the breakwater. In particular, he organized the delivery of stone. The project was overseen by the staff-captain and engineer Robet von Desin, the younger brother of Admiral William von Desin. On Kobozev's advice, von Desin decided to use local stone, instead of that from Kerch. However, Kobozev did not manage to complete the construction, and the breakwater was finished by A. Belichkov in 1869.

=== Fishing business ===
Nikolay Kobozev was the largest fishing industrialist on the Azov sea. Kobozev had managed to extend his father's business: he acquired 16 fisheries and developed a significant fishing fleet. Without being knowledgeable in ship construction or geometry, he took personal part in drawing and building his first two-master brig named Berdiansk that was launched on 14 April 1841 and set its first sail to Constantinopole. The brig was capable of carrying up to 246 tons of cargo. Kobozev had a dream to build a schooner from the draft plans sent to him by his friend Prince Mikhail Vorontsov, but the Crimean War ruined his plans.

Apart from fisheries near Berdiansk, he owned one on the Obetochnoe sandspit and the Fedotov sandspit, where his partner was Friedrich Fein, ancestor of Eduard von Falz-Fein.

=== Crimean war ===
On 31 May 1855, an Anglo-French squadron approached the Bay of Berdiansk seeking provisions. Berdiansk was heavily bombed. Kobozev managed to organize the evacuation of women, elders and children to the German colony of Neuhofnung (now, Osipenko, Berdiansk rayon) that housed them until the end of the war.

He initiated the intentional scuttling of merchant ships in the bay to prevent the enemy's fleet from landing in Berdiansk. As a result, he had lost six vessels and one brig, as well as 14 fishing boats.

However, Kobozev's motives in doing this were uncertain. Alongside some other city residents, he was suspected of collaborating with the English. A secret investigation was carried out against him.

After the war Kobozev organized the reconstruction of 250 buildings in the city.

== Personal life and family ==
Nikolay Kobozev was married to Anna Ivanovna. The marriage was childless. After his death, his estate passed to his brothers and his nephew, Fyodor Timchenko, the only surviving son of his sister Alexandra. The rest of her children died of typhus in 1865.

Nikolay had three brothers: Ivan, Aleksey and Alexander, all of whom moved to Kerch and a sister named Alexandra.

Ivan Kobozev was a merchant of the 1st Guild, a hereditary honorary citizen of Kerch, and a fishing industrialist. He was the sponsor of the Kerch girls' boarding school, and one of the activists for developing spa resorts in Kerch. He was the owner of an estate at Orta-Aul near Kerch. He was married to Anna Petrovna Mitrova (1834–1895), the daughter of the mayor of Kerch. During the Crimean War (1853–1856) she organized a free hospital for the wounded, for which she was awarded with the rank of honorary citizen, rare for women. Ivan Kobozev had a son named Aleksey. The latter's daughter, Alexandra Alekseevna, married Antuan Dziewanowski, the chief sanitary doctor of the Taurida district, and the brother of the Russian-Polish general Wacław Dziewanoski and a friend of Dmitry Lenin. His other grandchild, Ivan Alekseevich Kobozev (b. 1878) was a famous ophthalmologist. He was married to Maria Schlee, the daughter of Ferdinand Matveevich Schlee.

Alexander Kobozev had a son named Grigory, a staff-captain.

Kobozev's home in Berdiansk was visited by three heirs to the Russian throne. In the 1830s he housed Grand Duke Alexander, the future Emperor Alexander II. In 1863, Alexander II's son, Nikolay, stayed at his house in Berdiansk. In 1866 Grand Duke Konstantin Nikolaevich visited Kobozev's home. In 1881, the members of the Narodnaya Volya assassinated Alexander II. Coincidentally, one of the organizers, Yuriy Bogdanovich, used the alias "Kobozev".

One of Kobozev's friends was Andrey Dostoevsky, the younger brother of the famous writer. He frequently visited Kobozev for dinner, which he mentioned in his memoir. Once A. Dostoyevsky took part in Kobozev's famed ukha (fish soup) reception which took place at one of his fisheries on the Sea of Azov several miles from Berdiansk. His famous ukha was made from the freshly caught fish by his cooks on the spot. A. Dostoyevsky also took note of Kobozev's hospitality and exquisite treatment of his guests.

However, Kobozev's fortunes declined over years. He did not have an heir. After his death, he left large debts. To pay them his brothers transferred the ownership of the Winter Theater building to the municipality.

He died on 2 March 1866 in Berdiansk. His brothers arrived late to his funeral due to bad weather. He was buried at the cemetery church he built. The coffin was carried by the Cossacks who had worked at his fisheries. The funeral service was carried out by Archbishop Alexis of Simferopol and the Taurida.

== See also ==
- Berdiansk
- Kobuzev family
