= Kobuzev family =

The Kobuzev family Ко́бузевы Ко́бозевы, Ко́бызевы, Ко́бзевы
- boyar/noble family
- Country: Russia
- Earlier spellings: Кобузё́вы
- Etymology: Kóbuz, ancient Slavonic male name, meaning 'hawk'
- Origin: Upper Oka region, Grand Duchy of Ryazan
- Founded: prior to the 1300s
- Titles: boyar scions
- Connected families: Kobuzev-Kunakovsky
- Estates: Timofeevo (extinct), Zaraysky District, Moscow Oblast Tyutkovskoe, Zaraysky District, Moscow Oblast Novosyolki (Inyakino), Zaraysky District, Moscow Oblast

The Kobuzev family (also spelled: Kobyzev, Kobozev, Kobzev; Russian: Ко́бузевы, originally spelled: Кобузё́вы) is an ancient Russian noble family descended from Ryazanian boyar scions.

== History ==
The family's name stems from the name of the founder – Kobuz. Kobuz was a personal male Slavic Pagan name meaning 'hawk'.. The name has Lechitic origins. In the form of Kobus it is still found in Pomerania. Poles still refer to the Eurasian hobby as 'kobuz' (pronounced as kobus). As a personal name or a nickname, Kobuz (Russian: Кобуз, Кобузь) is found in written sources of the region of the Oka river, particularly the area of Ryazan. However, it is uncertain what status the family's progenitor had, while the Kobuzev family appears by the late 15th – early 16th centuries in the surviving written sources already with their last name and members of the local landed aristocracy.

The earliest Kobuzev mentioned so far was 'Vasily Ananyin syn Kobuzev' (meaning: Vasily, son of Ananiy of the Kobuzev family), mentioned in 1491 as a witness on a report to the boyar of the Grand Duke of Ryazan Ivan IV of Ryazan, Ivan Ivanovich 'Inka' Izmaylov, who was then the viceroy in Pereyaslavl of Ryazan and the commander of the Ryazanian troop.

In 1514, Semyon Ivanov syn Kobuzev was mentioned in Vishgorod-on-Yahroma (now extinct town of the Principality of Dmitrov, appanage domain of the Duchy of Vladimir-Suzdal) as a witness (poslukh) on a deed of land purchase of the Nelidov family. In 1524, his brother, Afanasy Ivanov syn Kobuzev was mentioned as a witness on a deed of land exchange.

By the 17th century the Kobuzev family of Ryazan had at least two allods: the village of Timofeevo (Andreevskoe), sold to the Birkin family in 1601, and the village of Tyutkosvoe, passed to the Likharyov family for overdue mortgage, in Perevitsky stan (now: the district of Zaraysk, Moscow oblast).

The Kobuzev family served to both the Grand Dukes of Ryazan and the Ryazanian archbishops. In the late 16th century, with the establishment of the unified Moscow government, the family began to serve to the Dukes of Moscow. The Kobuzev family is mentioned in all of the surviving Ryazanian lists of serving gentry (desyatnyas): 1604, 1648, and 1676.

Already in the 16th century some of the family members served as Cossacks. In 1551, Ivan the Terrible moved the entire garrison of Perevitsk to the east to provide military forces for the new citadel of Sviyazhsk for his campaign against Kazan. One of the Sviyazhsk Cossack atamans was Alexey Kobyzev, who led a Cossack troop in a battle with the Chuvashy in 1552. The battle was lost and the Cossacks had 70 men fallen.

== Family tree ==
=== Zaraysk branch ===
Kobuzev family tree. The Zaraysk branch
Timofey Kobuzev, lord of Tymofeeyvskaya hamlet, Perevitsky stan, Ryazan
  - Fyodor Timofeevich Kobuzev
    - Semyon Fyodorovich (d. before 1600), m. Daria
      - Semyon Semyonoivich
      - Jury Semyonovich (circa 1600-after 1648), Ryazan and Efremov boyar scion, lord of the manor at Golubochki (Storozhevoye) hamlet, Efremov district
        - Anisim Juryevich Kobyzev (circa 1640-after 1685), Efremov boyar scion, landlord at Golubochki-Storozhevoye
          - Larion Anisimovich
            - Hariton Larionovich
        - Filat Juryevich
          - Josef (Osip) Filatovich
            - Filat Osipovich
            - Grigory Osipovich
          - Fedot (Fyodor) Filatovich
    - Larion Fyodorovich, mentioned in 1567/68, boyar scion of Ryazan bishop, lord of Murmino hamlet
    - Ivan Fyodorovich, boyar scion of Ivan the Terrible, lord of the manor at Novosyolki-Inyakino, Perevitsky stan, Ryazan
      - Grigory Ivanovich, landlord at Novosyolki-Inyakino
        - Sila (Silanty) Grigoryevich, Ryazan boyar scion, mentioned in the 1648 desyatnya of Ryazan
        - Vasily Grigoryevich
        - Dmitry Grigoryevich
      - Nikita (Mitka) Ivanovich, landlord at Novosyolki-Inyakino
        - Jakov Nikitich, m. Akilina; landlord at Novosyolki-Inyakino
          - Fedot (Fyodor) Jakovlevich, m. Melanya Semyonovna Veselkina; landlord at Novosyolki-Inyakino
            - Klementy (Klim) Fedotovich, porutchik, landlord at Novosyolki-Inyakino
            - Timofey Fedotovich
            - Avdotya Fedotovna, m. Rodion Goltsov
            - Sofia Fedotovna, m. Isay Tregubov
          - Roman Jakovlevich
          - Ignat Jakovlevich
          - Anisim Jakovlevich
          - Pyotr Jakovlevich, m. Ekaterina.
            - Prohor Petrovich (d. after 1740), m. Aksinya Trofimovna Veselkina. Landlord at Novosyolki-Inyakino, Prudky and Plutalovo, Zaraysk district.
              - Pyotr Prohorovich (d. before 1801), landlord at Argunovo, Zaraysk
                - Aleksey Petrovich (d. after 1803), clerk at St. Peter fortress on the Siberian line.
              - Iona Prohorovich, m. Natalia Afanasyevna; landlord at Argunovo, Zaraysk
              - Vasily Prohorovich
            - Eufimy (Euphemius) Petrovich, m. Anna Fyodorovna Pryamoglyadova.
              - Mikhail Eufimyevich, mentioned as 'nobleman', landlord of Zaraysk district.
          - Mikhail Jakovlevich
          - Maxim Jakovlevich
          - Nikita Jakovlevich (1667-after 1722), praporschik of a dragoon regiment, landlord at Novosyolki-Inyakino
          - Dementy Jakovlevich
        - Mokey Nikitich, boyar scion, mentioned in the 1648 Ryazan desyatnya; landlord at Novosyolki-Inyakino
      - Semyon Ivanovich, landlord at Novosyolki-Inyakino
        - Ivan Semyonovich, boyar scion, mentioned in the 1648 Ryazan desyatnya; landlord at Novosyolki-Inyakino
          - Vasily Ivanovich, landlord at Argunovo, Zaraysky district
            - Panfil Vasilyevich (d. before 1754)
              - Maria Panfilovna, m. corporal Roman Plutalov
          - Artemy Ivanovich, dragoon, landlord at Novosyolki-Inyakino
            - Praskovia Artemyevna, m. Nikolay Astafiev
      - Anna Ivanovna
    - Pyotr Fyodorovich, boyar scion, lord of the manor at Ontonyevy Novosyolki, Perevitsky stan, Ryazan
    - Vasily Fyodorovich
  - Larion Timofeevich Kobuzev, boyar scion, lord of manor at Argunovo, Perevitsky stan, Ryazan
  - Ivan Timofeevich Kobuzev, boyar scion, lord of manor at Argunovo
    - Lukyan Ivanovich, boyar scion, lord of the manor at Zimjonki, Zaraysk

=== Pronsk branch ===
Kobuzev family tree. The Pronsk branch
Alexander (Olyosha) Safonovich Kobuzev (d. before 1648), boyar scion, landlord at Hodynino and Duryshkino, Kamensky stan, Ryazan (later, Pronsk district)
  - Ivan Alexandrovich Kobuzev (d. after 1648), Ryazan boyar scion, in the court list of the 1648 desyantya, landlord at Duryshkino, Kamensky stan, Ryazan
    - Andrey Ivanovich, m. Varvara Ivanovna Smerdova
      - Akilina Andreevna (d. 1749), m. Ignaty Petrovich Borodavkin
      - Avdotya Andreevna, m. Artemy varlamovich Jakovlev
    - Grirgory Ivanovich, m. Agrafena; boyar scion, took part in the Chigirin campaign as an officer, wounded in 1679 at battlefield
      - Semyon Grigoryevich, m. Vassa (Vasilisa) Nikonovna (Nikiforovna); soldier at Semyonovsky Life Guards Regiment.
    - Matryona Ivanovna, m. Mikhail Puschin
    - Aksinya Ivanovna

=== Kobuzev-Kunakovsky ===
Kobuzev-Kunakovsky tree
Larion Fyodorovich Kobuzev (Russian: Ларя Федоров сын Кобузев), boyar scion of the Bishop of Ryazan, lord of the manor at Murmino. Mentioned, 1567/68.

Nazar Logvinovich Kobuzev-Kunakovsky (circa 1580-after 1604), boyar scions of the bishop of Ryazan. In 1604 he was enrolled with the tsar's boyar scions. Landlord at Tarasovka, Perevitsky stan, Ryazan.

  - Savva (Savely) Nazarovich Kobuzev-Kunakovsky, m. Maria. Landlord at Tarasovka
    - Anton Savvich Kobuzev-Kunakovsky
      - Fyodor Antonovich Kunakovsky
    - Gavrila Savvich Kobuzev-Kunakovsky
    - Rodion Savvich Kobuzev-Kunakovsky
    - Grigory Savvich Kobuzev-Kunakovsky

== Proof of nobility ==
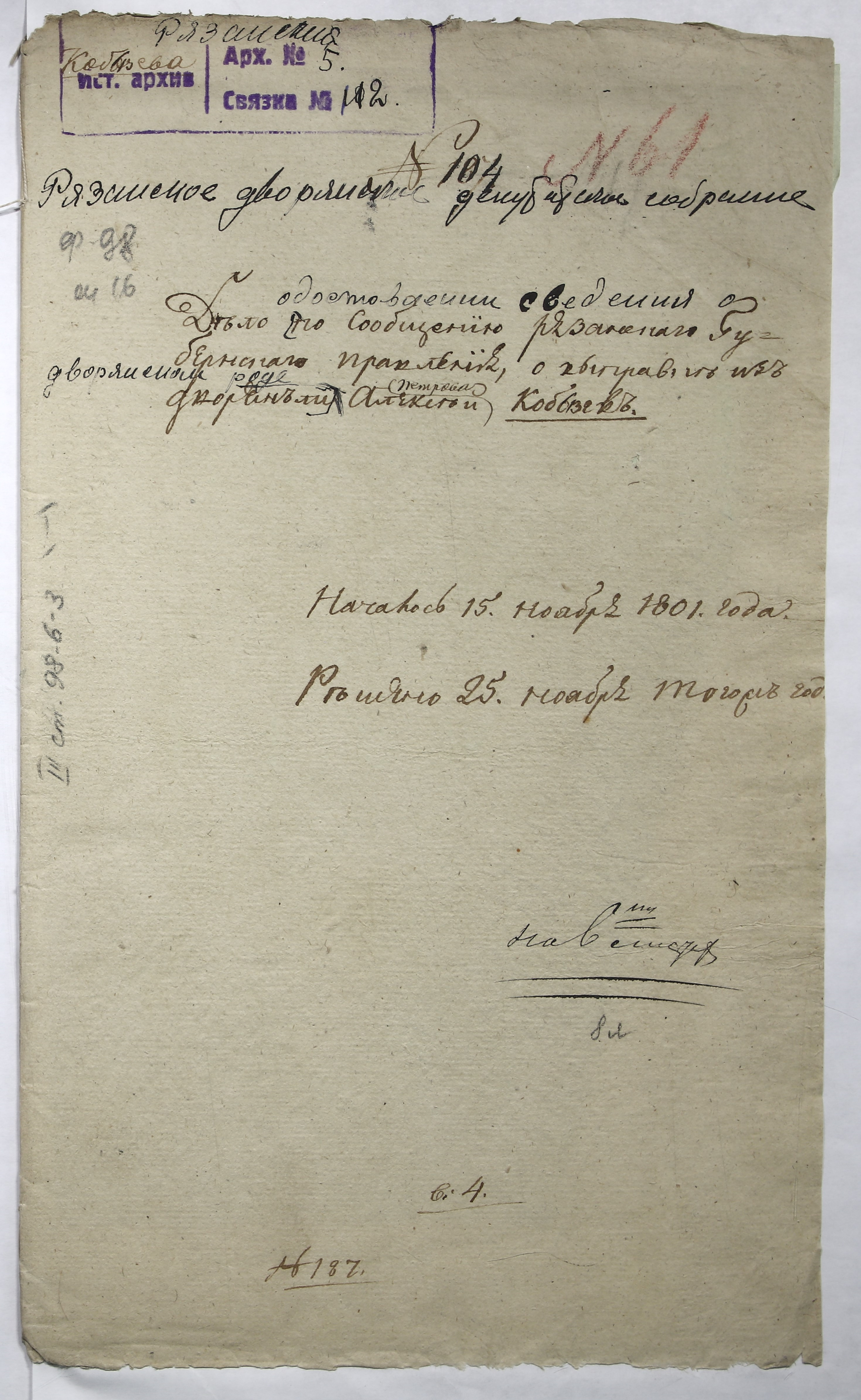
The file cover of Aleksey Kobyzev's case of nobility from the State Archive of Ryazan Oblast

In 1801 one of the Zaraysk Kobuzev family's descendants attempted to prove nobility through his ancestry's landholding status. Due to the reforms started

by Peter the Great, who introduced new social estates, including dvoryanstvo, noble status in the Russian Empire could not be automatically inherited, and if not gained via the Table of Ranks, it should be proved that one's ancestry had noble status. In 1785, Catherine II introduced a Charter for nobility that suggested a list of indications of the 'ancient noble family' status.

Aleksey Petrovich Kobyzev, the son of Pyotr Prohorovich Kobuzev, a landlord of Argunovo hamlet, Zaraysk district, served at St. Peter fortress on the Siberian line (now the city of Petropavl, Kazakhstan) as a 13th class commissary of the Commisariat staff, which did not allows of getting the official noble status. In 1801 he attempted to prove nobility of his family by approaching the noble assembly of the Ryazan governorate asking them to research the nobility of his father's family in the archives. The case took three years. The assembly failed to find anything on the family in the archives, apart from that his father actually owned a manor at Argunovo. However, it wasn't enough and the noble assembly rejected to accept Aleksey Kobuzev in Ryazanian nobility. Thus, the family was not included to the genealogical book of Ryazan, as was then required for families claiming hereditary nobility through their ancestry. The file containing the investigation of Aleksey's case is currently at the State Archive of the Ryazan Oblast (fonds 98, series 16, file 5).

== Some historical landed estates ==
- Timofeevo (Andreevskoe; Russian: деревня Тимофеевская Андреевское тож), a village in Perevitsky stan (now Zaraysky District, Moscow Oblast), on the Osyotrik river, the righthand tributary of the Osyotr river, namely at the mouth of its tributary, a small river called Yamna. This village is now extinct. It was purchased by Timofey (Vasilyevich?) Kobuzev circa 1530s. In the late 16th century the half of the village was state-owned and allotted in fiefdom to various gentry. Half of the village was shared by the Kobuzevs and the Birkins. In 1601 the village was completely bought up by the Birkin family.
- Tyutkosvkoe (Russian: Тютковское), a village in Perevitsky stan, an allod. In 1649, passed to the Likharyov family for overdue mortgage
- Staroe Kobusevo (Russian: Старое Кобузева; extinct) a village in the area of Likhvin (now Chekalin, Tula oblast), the Duchy of Odoyev; an allod, owned by the family until the late 1400s.
- Kobuzevo (Trufanovo), Gorodsky stan, Uglich uyezd.
- An estate at Novosyolky-Inyakino (Russian: Новосёлки-Инякино) in Perevitsky stan (now: Zaraysk district, Moscow Oblast), owned in fiefdom. The estate at Inyakino was first received by Ivan Fyodorov syn Kobuzev, grandson of Tymofey Kobuzev, before 1575.
- A half of Duryshkino with the Timiryazesvkoe estate (Russian: Дурышкино с сельцом Тимирязевское), Kamensky stan (now: Pronsky District, Ryazan Oblast), owned in fiefdom by Alexander Sofonov syn Kobuzev since 1610.
- An estate at Khodynino (Russian: Ходынино), Okologorodny stan (now: Rybnovsky District, Ryazan Oblast), owned in fiefdom.
- Zimyonki-Troetskie (Russian: Зимёнки-1, Зимёнки Троицкие) a village in Zaraysky District, Moscow Oblast, owned in fiefdom.
- Argunovo (Kalemino), on the Kalmana river, a tributary of the Osyotr, Perevitsky stan (now Zaraysky district, Moscow Oblast), in fiefdom.
- Kobuzevo on the Oka river, Nepolotsky stan, Orlovsky uyezd.
- Kobyzevo (Russian: деревня Кобузёвская, село Кобызево, Кобзево; extinct), Sviyazhsk y uyezd, owned in fiefdom by Alexey Kobyzev, a Sviyazhsk Cossack ataman in 1550s.
