= Haisyn =

City in Vinnytsia Oblast, Ukraine

Haisyn Гайсин
- City
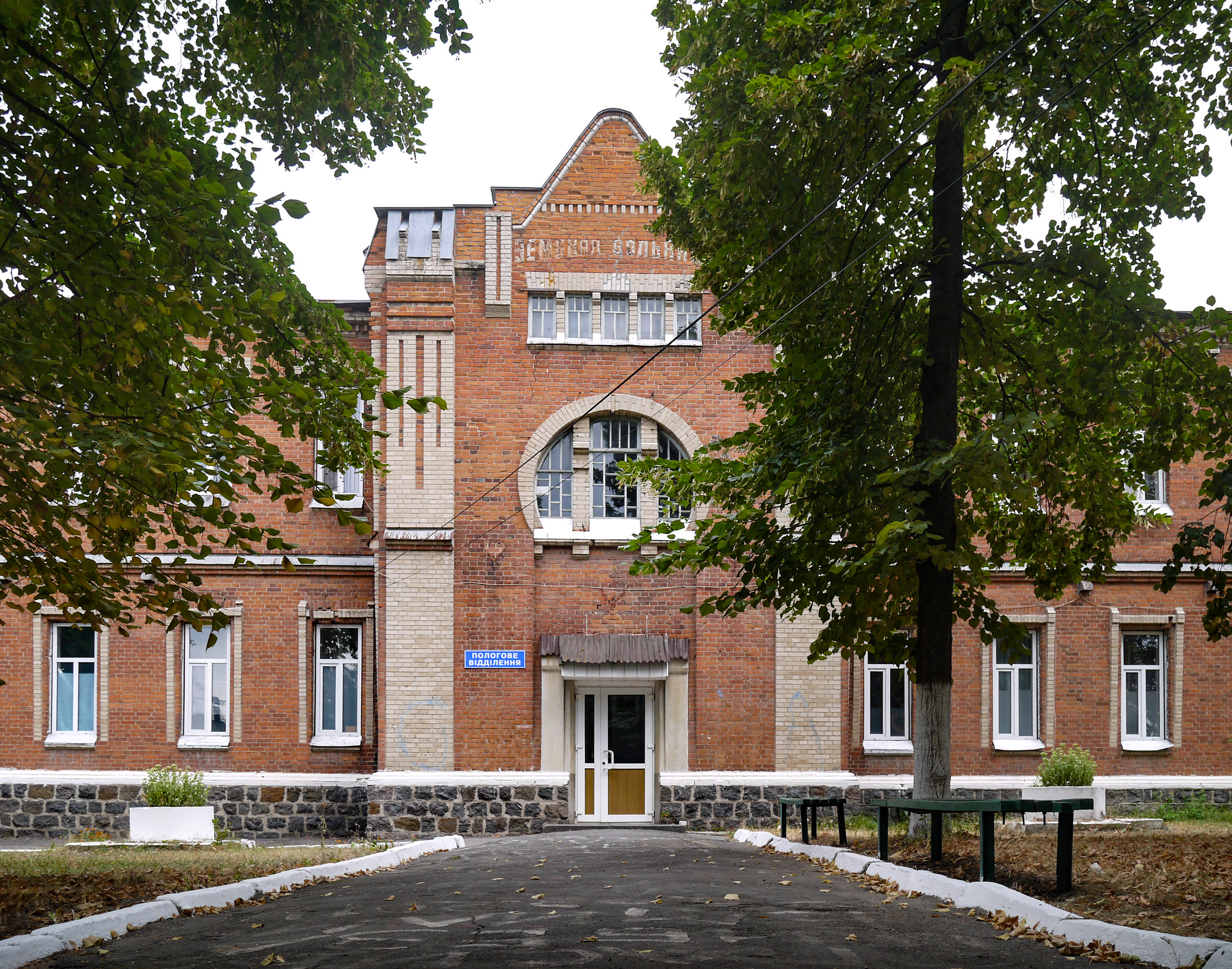
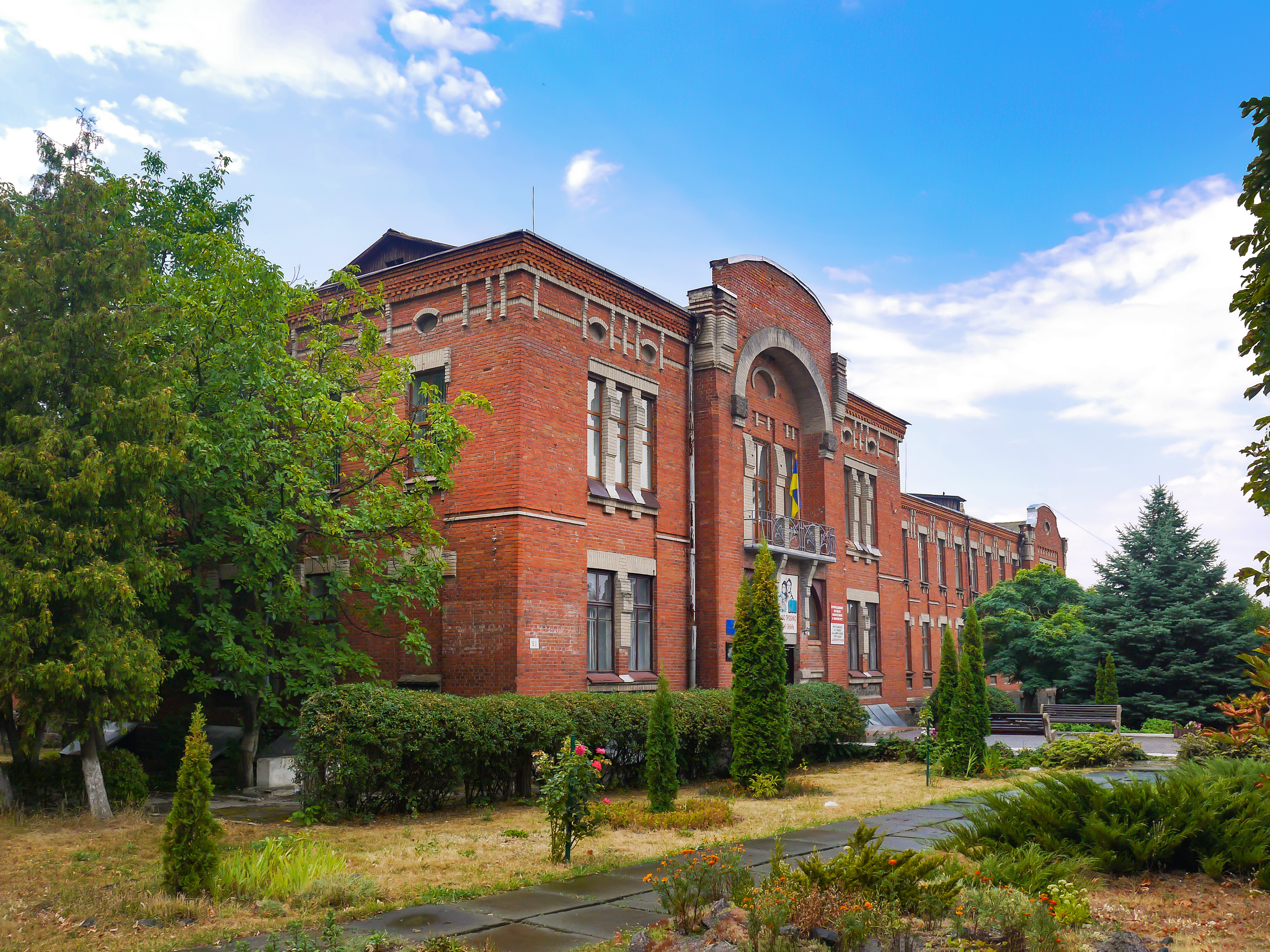
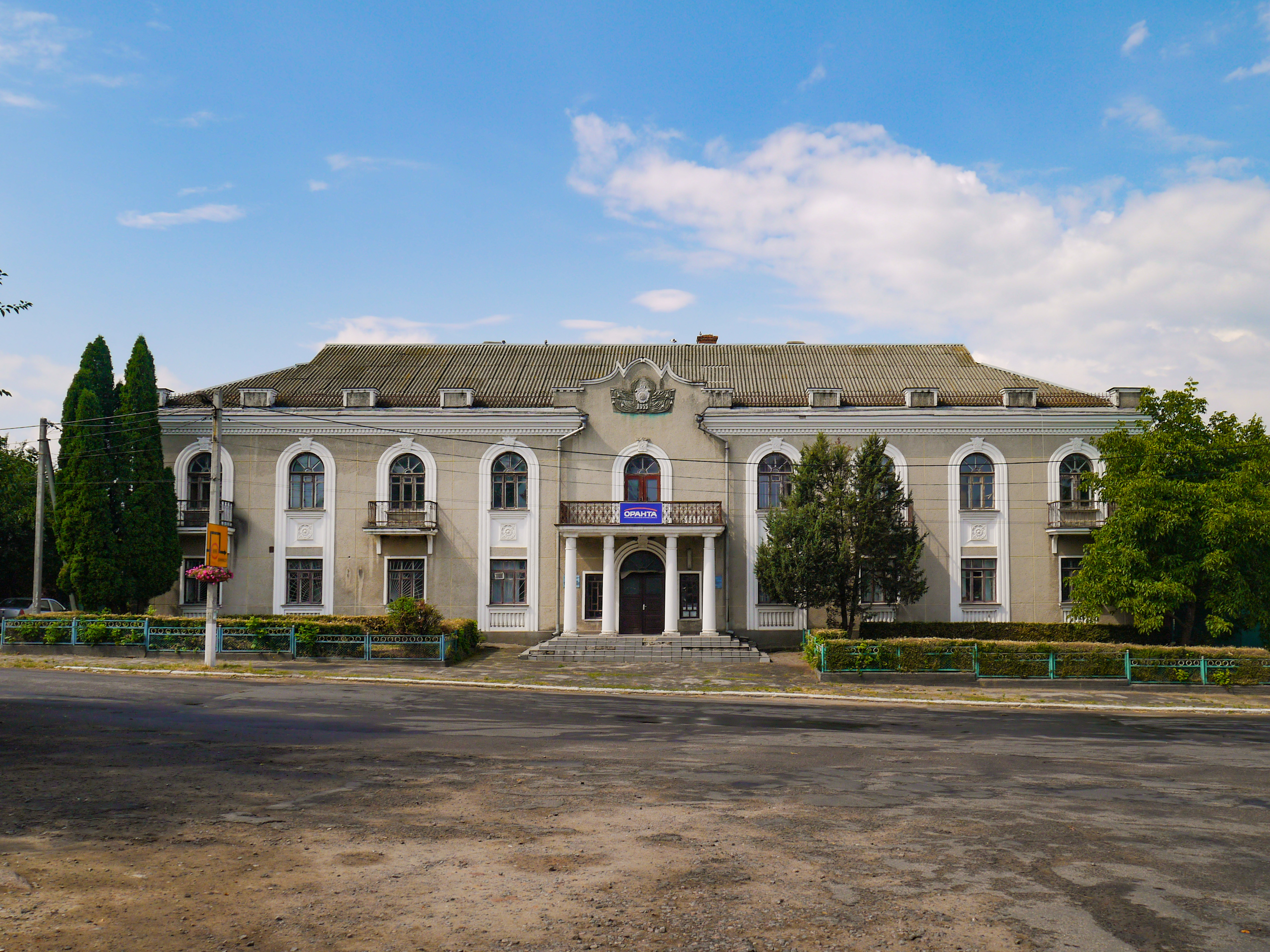
- Clockwise from top: Regional Hospital; Administrative Building; Gymnasium

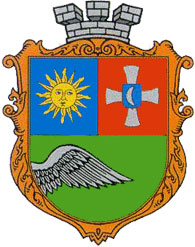
- Coat of arms
- Interactive map of Haisyn
- Location within Vinnytsia Oblast Location within Ukraine
- Coordinates: 48°48′37″N 29°23′3″E
- Country: Ukraine
- Oblast: Vinnytsia Oblast
- Raion: Haisyn Raion
- Hromada: Haisyn urban hromada
- Founded: 1545
- City status: 1744

Population (2024)
  - Total: 23,027
- Time zone: UTC+2 (EET)
  - Summer (DST): UTC+3 (EEST)

Haisyn (Ukrainian: Гайсин, IPA: [ˈɦɑjsɪn]; Yiddish: הײַסין, romanized: Haysin) or Haysyn is a city in central Ukraine. It serves as the administrative center of Haisyn Raion within Vinnytsia Oblast. It is located on the Sob in the eastern part of the historical region of Podolia. Its population is 25,698 (2022 estimate).

== Name ==
It is believed by many scholars that the origin of the name "Haisyn" is Turkic in origin, as the land was previously inhabited by the Black Klobuks during the 11th and 12 centuries. Haisyn is derived from a Turkic word meaning "camp(ing) on a hill".

In addition to the Ukrainian Гайсин (Haisyn), in other languages the name of the city is Polish: Hajsyn and Russian: Гайсин, romanized: Gaysin, Gaisin.

== History ==
Historical affiliations

Grand Duchy of Lithuania 1459–1569
Polish–Lithuanian Commonwealth 1569–1672
Ottoman Empire 1672–1699
Polish–Lithuanian Commonwealth 1699–1793
Russian Empire 1793–1917
Ukrainian People's Republic 1917-1918, 1918-1920
Ukrainian State 1918
Soviet Ukraine 1920–1922
Soviet Union 1922–1941
Kingdom of Romania 1941–1944
Soviet Union 1944–1991
Ukraine 1991–present

=== Polish rule ===
Hajsyn was first mentioned in 1545. In 1566, following the Union of Lublin, it became part of the Bracław Voivodeship of the Polish-Lithuanian Commonwealth. Under the rule of Stephen Báthory, the land was given to Tromchinsky family of feudal lords.

In 1600, the settlement was granted to nobleman Swirski. In 1605, it passed from nobleman Oriszewski to Jadwiga Różynska of the Ruzhinsky family through right of her 4th husband, although her rights to the land would be disputed with neighboring families until 1616 when the land was finally transferred to the Odrzywolski family for "lifetime possession".

On 16 November 1621, King of Poland Sigismund III gave the land of Haisyn to the nobleman Jan Dzierzka for his military services. 8 years later, the census of 1629 showed the village to have a population of 822 people.

Haisyn suffered many damages during the Khmelnytsky Uprising (1648–1654), which was accompanied by looting of property and mass murder of the Jewish population in the area.

In 1659, King of Poland John II Casimir Vasa granted Gaisin to the Zaporizhian Maxim Bulyga. This was most likely done in an attempt to appease the Cossack population in order to maintain security in the region in the event that Turkish or Russian forces invaded the area. However, in 1660, the land was granted to Stanislaw Jakubowski.

In 1699, according to the Treaty of Karlowitz, the Ottoman Empire recognized Haisyn as part of Poland. Polish feudal lords began managing the land once more, between which there were constant internecine disputes. The Ogiński and Sapieha families fought over the city. Caught in the crossfires of the dispute, Haisyn was plundered in 1701 and nearly destroyed.

Much of the 18th century was a turbulent time for Jews and Poles in the town. During 1734 and 1750, Haydamak uprisings devastated the ethnically Polish and Jewish populations in the Bratslav Voivodeship, with both being massacred by Ukrainian rebels. The exact number of victims slaughtered is not known, but almost all sources record that there was a near-total destruction of the communities during the conflict.

In 1744, King Augustus III granted Haisyn Magdeburg rights, making it a royal city of the Poland.

In 1768, another Haydamak uprising occurred, and the citizens of the town joined the revolt. A mass-murder of Jews and Poles once again ensued. After the suppression of the uprising, the lands of Haisyn were divided among the magnates of Potocki family, among others Jaroszynski, Sobanski, and Holoniewski. Haisyn itself with the surrounding villages, was given to Anthony Leduchowski in 1775. In 1783, he received the royal privilege to own the city and surrounding villages for the next 50 years. However, in 1789, Haisyn was given by Leduchowski to Earl Felix Potocki, who owned 10 thousand dessiatinas of settled land and 1,200 dessiatinas of forest in the region.

At the time of the 1790 census, there were only 50 Jews in Haisyn. Following Jewish immigration waves within Eastern Europe, the population rapidly grew. By the year 1800, there were 1,275 Jews in the Haisyn district, with a total population of 1,857.

On 22 May 1792, Haisyn became a town of regional significance.

=== Under Russian sovereignty ===
The city was annexed by the Russian Empire in 1793 during the Second Partition of Poland, and became part of the Bratslav Viceroyalty. It became part of the Podolia Governorate in 1797, with its town status upheld in 1804. The county was divided into 3 districts, Kuna, Teplyk, and Ternovka. A stone church, the Church of St. Nicholas, was built in the town.

The Haisyn City Council was created in 1793, but its oversight was limited to collection of taxes, and maintenance of city utilities (police, schools, hospitals, etc.). From 1793 to 1861, it also had a City Magistrate, which performed judicial and tax functions. At the end of the 18th century, the governor of Haisyn was Colonel Petro Chechel, who is famous for the palace that he erected as his residence after purchasing multiple villages in the Starokonstantinovsky district.

==== Economic issues and growth ====
In the first half of the 19th century, the town had a mixed population of Jews and Ukrainians. A resolution was issued on 1836, authorizing local police to allocate 2000 rubles from the treasury due to insufficient funds from the government. Lack of funding for the town's necessities had a negative impact on the organization and work of the local government, hindering the development of the rapidly growing town.

I commanded to leave the Magistrate in its former position in Gaisin, until the sources for multiplying municipal revenues are found, so (...) 2) that the local provincial administration, upon discovering new ways to sufficiently increase municipal revenues, submit its thoughts on the possibility of establishing a Duma to the Ministry of Internal Affairs (...)

The government took a number of practical steps to develop the province, including the provision of special benefits:

24 December 1841. To improve the welfare of the cities of Podolia province, privileges were granted to merchants, burghers, and people of free means, who moved to these cities from areas that did not belong to the Western provinces.

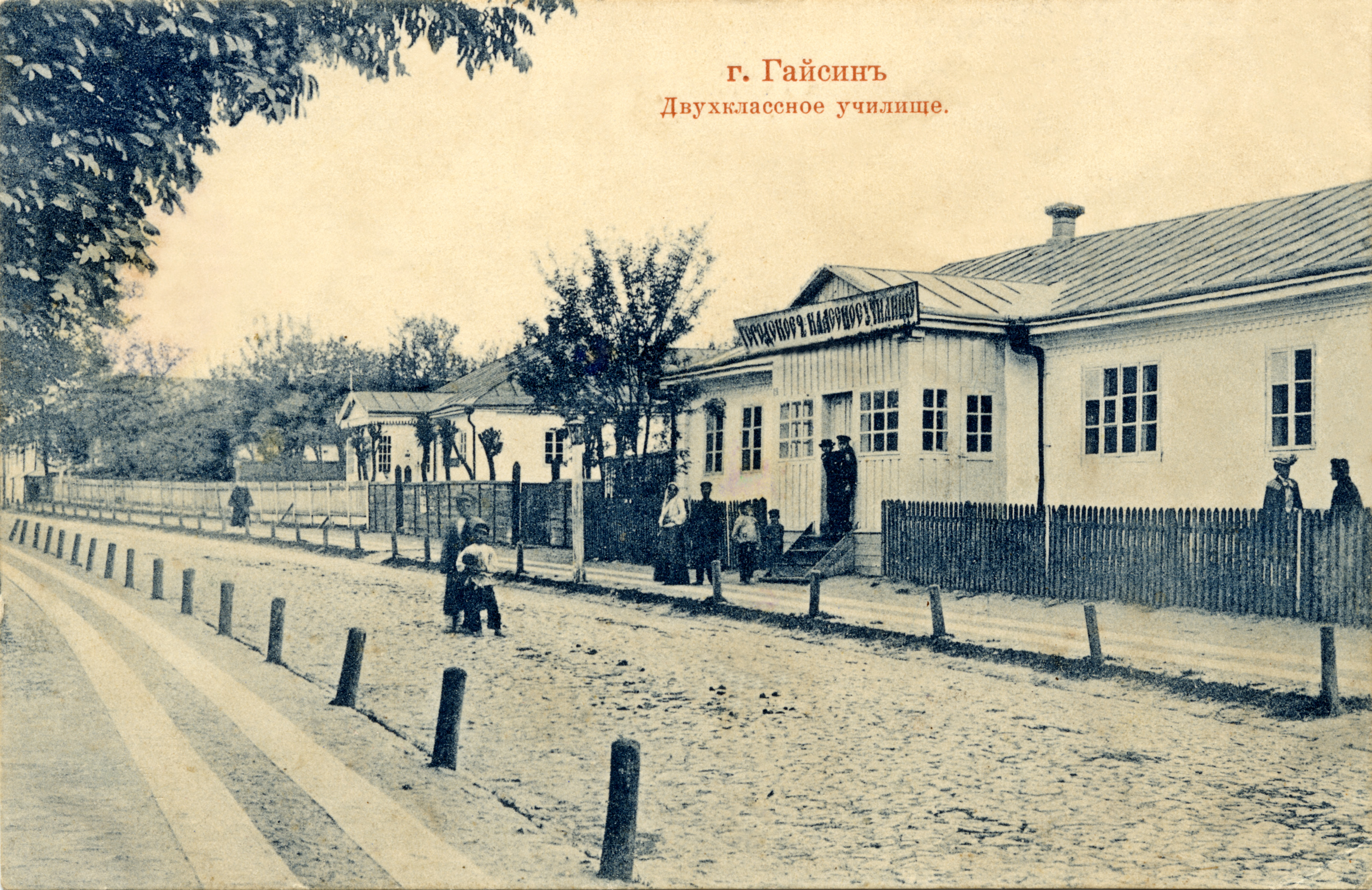
Early 20th-century postcard of two-year college in Gaysin

The local government organization developed many town offices, including:

- The Magistrate (Composition: the mayor, two burgomasters, and four ratmans)
- Orphans' Court
- Legal Court
- City Deputies' Assembly
- Quarter Commission (dealt with the cantonment of military units)

In 1834, the Jewish community in Haisyn had reached 1,692 people. The town contained a synagogue, a beit-midrash, two houses of prayer, and six cheders. There were three rabbis and three mohels. The population grew further to 2,175 by 1863, split across 262 "individual Jewish buildings". By 1896, that figure had risen to 5,152.

In 1843, a wealthy merchant by the name of Israel Rozin settled in Haisyn and began a business producing and selling alcohol. His philanthropic activity towards the local population and soldiers made him favorable in eyes of the local government, which bestowed upon him honors equal to a military rank in civilian status. During a cholera epidemic in 1855, Rozin undertook paycuts and provided free services and alcohol to citizens.

By 1855, the ratio of Jews to Christians was 1,246 to 1,305, with 271 Jewish merchants and 45 Christian merchants. There were many artisans among the Jewish population.

In 1858, there were 10,106 inhabitants (5,316 men and 4,790 women) in Haisyn, the town budget was a little over 5,000 rubles (the town's income was 5060 rubles 93.75, and their expenses were 5055 rubles 25 kopecks). In 1863 there were 9,630 inhabitants in Haisyn (4,952 men and 4,678 women). Over five years (see above) the city's population decreased by 476 people.

In 1859, in the village of Mohylne, Haisyn district, the Mohylne sugar factory was founded. Refining sugar from sugar beets became an important industry for the town. In the 1864–1865 season, the Mohylne factory, as well as Krasnosilka factory, produced a total of 24,480 poods of sugar. Another refinery, the Sobolivka Sugar Refinery, was founded in 1868.

Russian economic reforms from 1860 to 1880 significantly accelerated the industrial development in the region. Cloth manufacturing in Haisyn county accounted for more than half of the total manufacturing capacity in the entire Podolia govenrorate. A silk factory was opened in the city, and in 1870, a brick factory was founded. Two tobacco processing plants were founded in 1880 and 1897. A steam mill opened up on the outskirts of the city. Two printing houses were established in the city by Jews. One by Udla Leibovna Shvartsman in 1876, and one in 1893 by Nukhim Volkovich Weinstein.

In May 1886, by the initiative of Archpriest Nikandr Gavrilovich Mikhnevich, the Holy Protection City Cathedral was founded. It was a five-domed brick building on a stone plinth with a bell tower. Inside, there was a three-tiered wooden iconostasis. There was a church cemetery near the cathedral. In the 1930s, the church, like many other religious buildings, was destroyed by Soviet authorities.

==== Late Russian Empire and WWI ====
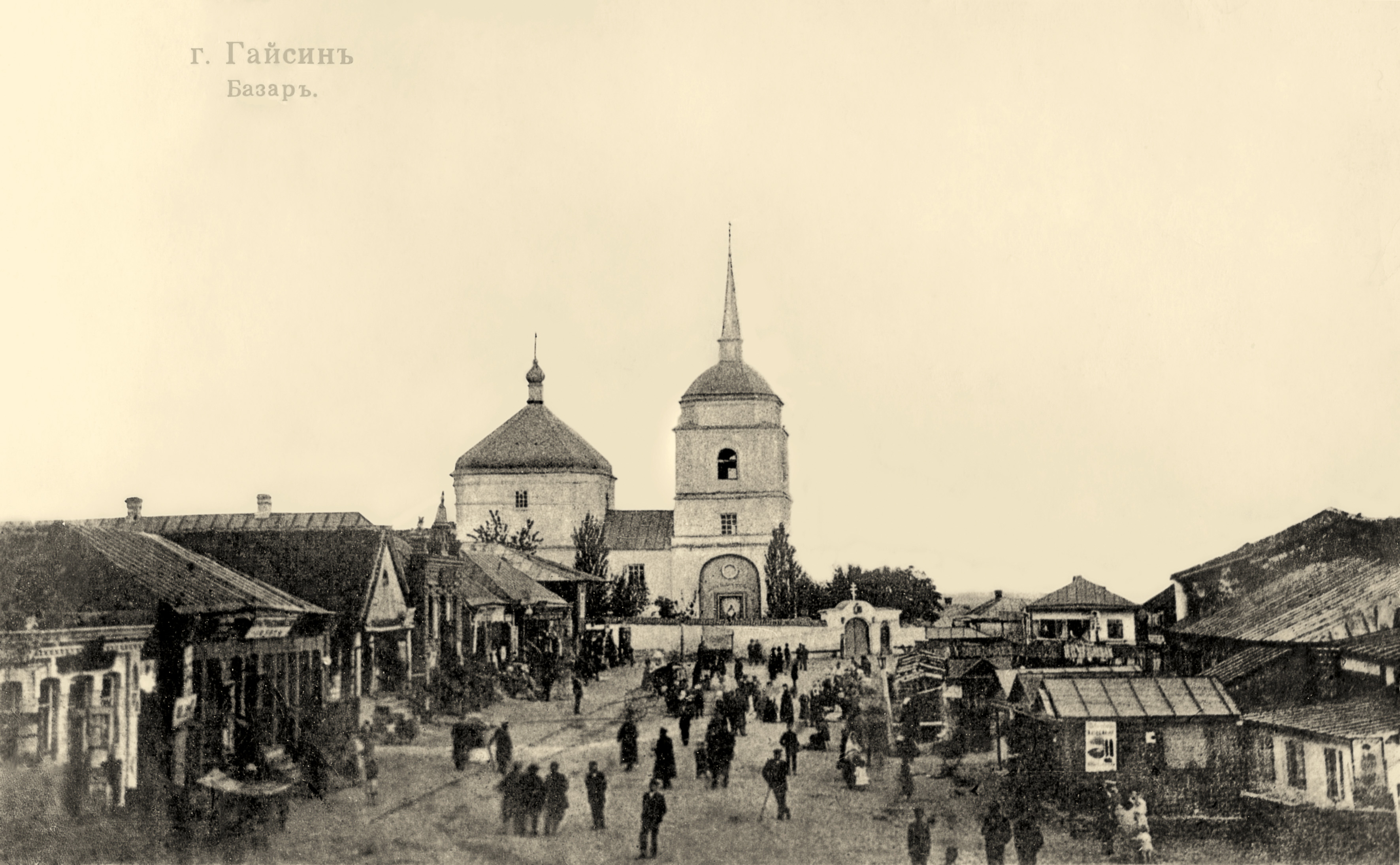
Photo of market in Haisyn prior to the Russian Revolution

In 1896, there were 9,367 inhabitants in Haisyn, including 5,152 Jews (55.5%), and 3,840 Orthodox Christians (41.0%). There was one church, one synagogue, five Jewish prayer houses, and one schismatic chapel. There were nine plants and factory-industrial establishments, including one distillery, one candle factory, one tobacco factory, one copper-iron factory. For education, there was one male college for higher education and one female college with preparatory and handicrafts classes.

According to the 1897 census, there were 9,374 inhabitants in Haisyn, including:

- Origin: 7,582 Haisyn natives, 641 natives from other Podolian districts, 1,135 citizens from other Governorates, and 16 foreigners
- Class: 7733 petty bourgeois, 1075 peasants, 356 noblemen, 109 merchant, 43 hereditary and personal noblemen (and their immediate family), 33 persons of clerical rank (and their immediate family), 17 foreign citizens, 8 belonging to other estates, and 1 non-specified estate
- Native language: Jewish 4,322 (46.11%), Ukrainian 3,946 (42.1%), Russian 884 (9.43%), Polish 167 (1.78%)[39], Tatar 24, German 13, and 17 who spoke another native language
- Faith: 4,557 Russian Orthodox (out of 212,002 in the district), 4,321 Jews (out of 21,438 in the district), 264 Old-believers and those "deviating from Orthodoxy", 181 Roman Catholics, 30 Mohammedans, 15 Lutherans, 4 Armenian Gregorians, and 2 Armenian Catholics

A significant event for the city's economy was the opening by the Southern Society of access roads in 1900 of a narrow-gauge railroad from Zhytomyr to Olviopil, which passed through Haisyn. By that time, the city had become one of the largest in Podolia. In 1900, the town budget of Haisyn amounted to more than 30,000 rubles (36,437 rubles in revenues, and 23,944 rubles in expenditures).

By 1902, Haisyn had a total of 10,765 residents. There was a public school, 23 factories and plants employing 631 workers, with a total annual production value of 656,820 rubles. A library was opened the same year.

Many Jews began to leave Haisyn in 1905 following Pogroms that hit the city particularly hard. Nevertheless, there were nearly 7,000 Jews in Gaisyn in 1917, constituting half the city's population.

The population of Haisyn in 1910 was 13,222. It had 6,208 Russian Orthodox, 359 Catholics, 14 Mohammedans, and 6,629 Jews.

The development of the city was fast on the eve of World War I. There were 36 registered enterprises in the town, including a newly opened meteorological station. Stone buildings became more commonplace, including a hospital, bank, grand hotel, law office, schoolhouse, and pharmacy.

During World War I, the 75th Sevastopol Infantry Regiment of the Southwestern Front was stationed in the city.

==== Russian Revolution ====
Following the beginning of the Russian Revolution, pogroms broke out across the entire country, including Haisyn. The town had a local Bolshevik faction, which included many Jews, who fought back against the bandits. From 1918 to 1920 there were continued pogroms in the city. Troops of volunteers, the Red Army, and the Ukrainians took part in them.

Bolshevik troops (7th Army of the Southwestern Front) captured Haisyn and took control of the city on 2 February 1918.

In June 1918, the Haisyn district committee of the Council of Peasant Deputies distributed leaflets condemning the election of the Hetman and in favor of the Central Rada. Headman of the district Olexandr Savostyanov reported the leaflets to the Minister of Internal Affairs, resulting in the arrests of the Assistant District Commissioner and the Chairman of the People's Council.

Nearly a year later, during the seizure of Haisyn by the gangs of Ataman Ananiy Volynets, 1,200 people were killed, most of whom were Jews. Later in the year, during the city's capture by Anton Denikin, business and homes were looted and women were raped. At least 152 people were killed in Haisyn in May 1919. Other estimates place the death toll as high as 390. More violence against Jews took place between 20 July and 25 July. One witness of pogroms in Ukraine during the Russian Revolution stated the following about how the pattern took place:

The most common type of pogrom is as follows. Armed men burst into a town or locality, scatter through the streets, rush in groups into Jewish apartments, murder with no care for age or sex, they brutally rape and often kill women, extort money under threat of death and then kill the victims, seize what they can carry, and break down ovens and walls in search of money and valuables. One group is followed by the second, the third, and so on, until there is nothing left to carry or take away. In Pereyaslav during the pogrom of 15–19 July by Zeleny, each Jewish apartment was visited by bandits 20-30 times a day. Later, the building was reduced to nothing but window panes, bricks and beams. Both those who would be murdered and the survivors are stripped down to their underwear, or sometimes even naked. Delegations of Jews or well-meaning Christians are sent to the newly-appointed authorities to ask for an end to the pogrom. The authorities agree on the condition that the surviving Jewish population pay a ransom to the government. The money is paid, new demands are made to deliver boots, meat, and so on. In the meantime, the groups [of bandits] continue to terrorize the remaining Jews, extort money, kill, and rape. Then, the enemy enters the town or locality, often completing the robbery of Jews and continuing the savage violence. The old thugs disappear, only to return again a few days later. [...] It is extremely common for Jews to be transported for mass murder, torture and robbery to one house: to the synagogue like in Ivankov, Rotmistrovka, and Ladyzhenka, to the Office or Executive Committee in Funduklejevka, Ladyzhenka, and Novomirgorod, or simply to some house as in Gaisin or Davydka.

In October 1919, the city was occupied by units of the Volunteer Army during fights against the Sich Riflemen and Ukrainian People's Army. By January, Denikin's troops had fled the city. On 7 January 1920, Prime Minister Isaak Mazepa, Colonel N. Nikonov, and P. Fedenko arrived in Haisyn on their way from Vinnitsa. Mazepa described the condition of the city upon his arrival:

In Haisyn itself, there had been no law enforcement for more than two weeks. There was complete indifference and apathy [towards the suffering]. No one even thought of organizing the authorities. Even the local rebel Ataman Volynets, with whom Fedchenko had a meeting at that time, was sitting in one of the neighboring villages near Haisyn and "resting" without work.

Until the establishment of the USSR, the city would continue to change hands, with death and destruction following. In February 1920 Haisyn was captured by the Red Army, in May by Tyutyunnyk's forces, then by Volynets' rebel brigade. Every transition of power in the city was accompanied by pogroms and looting. After the Soviet offensive on 6 June 1920, Haisyn was reconquered by the Red Army under the command of Pyotr Solodukhin, after being defended by the 18th Polish Infantry Division.

==== Early Soviet Union ====
A local newspaper began publishing in Haisyn in 1920. In 1922, the 24th Samara Rifle Division was stationed in the city, followed by troops of the 2nd Kotovsky Cavalry Corps. From 1923 to 1925, Gaisyn was the center of the Gaisynsky district of the USSR.

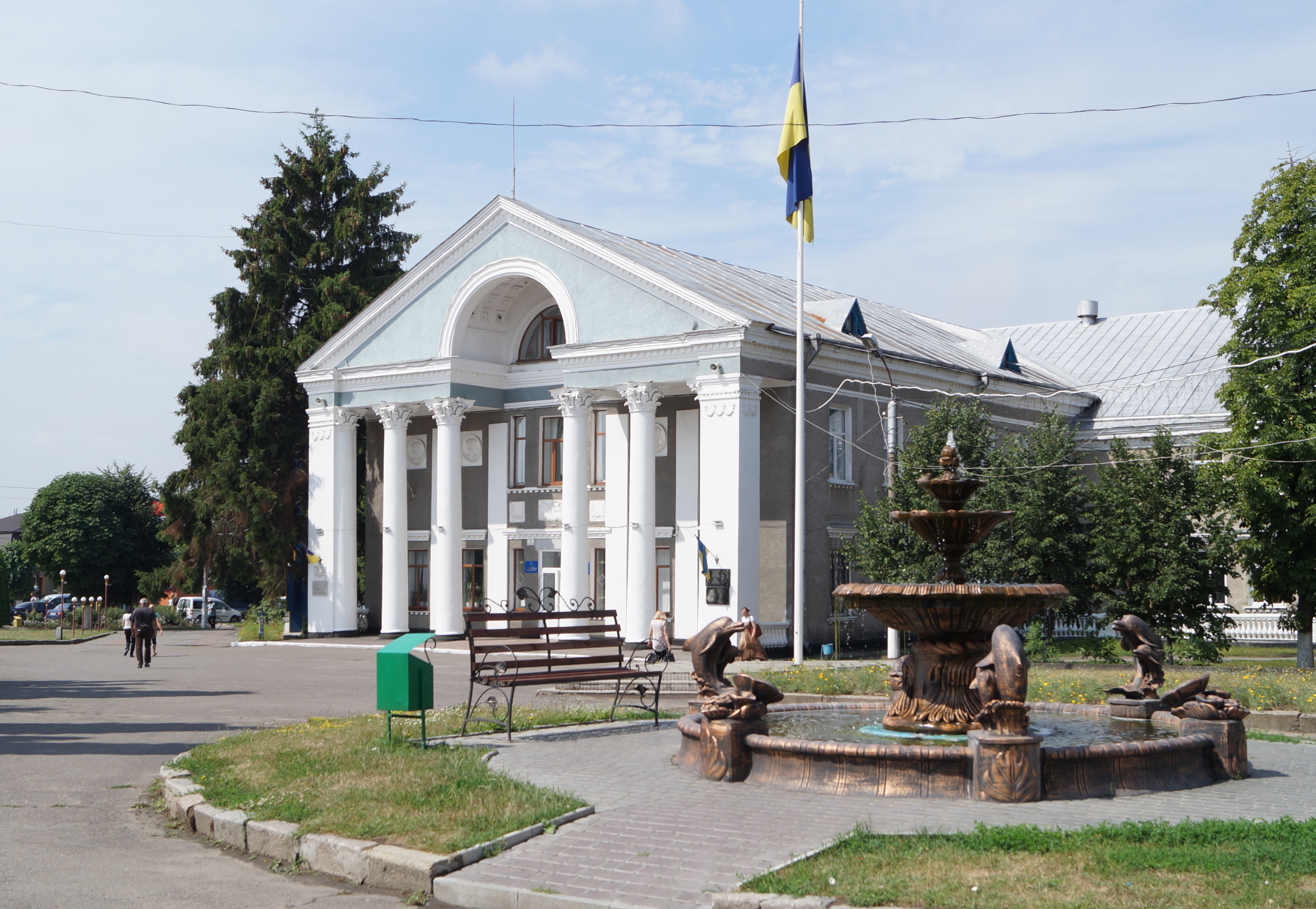
Haisyn house of culture

In 1922, a Yiddish department was opened at the local higher education institution.

During the NEP period, there was a short-term revival of trade and entrepreneurial activity in the Jewish community, but with the winding down of the NEP and the cessation of private trade activity, some of the Jews of Gaisin were forced to join the Jewish collective farm organized in the city.

In 1926, 5,190 Jews (33.9% of the total population) lived in Gaisin, and in 1939, the number fell to 4,109. In the late 1930s, the large synagogue was demolished, and the small synagogue and Jewish school were closed.

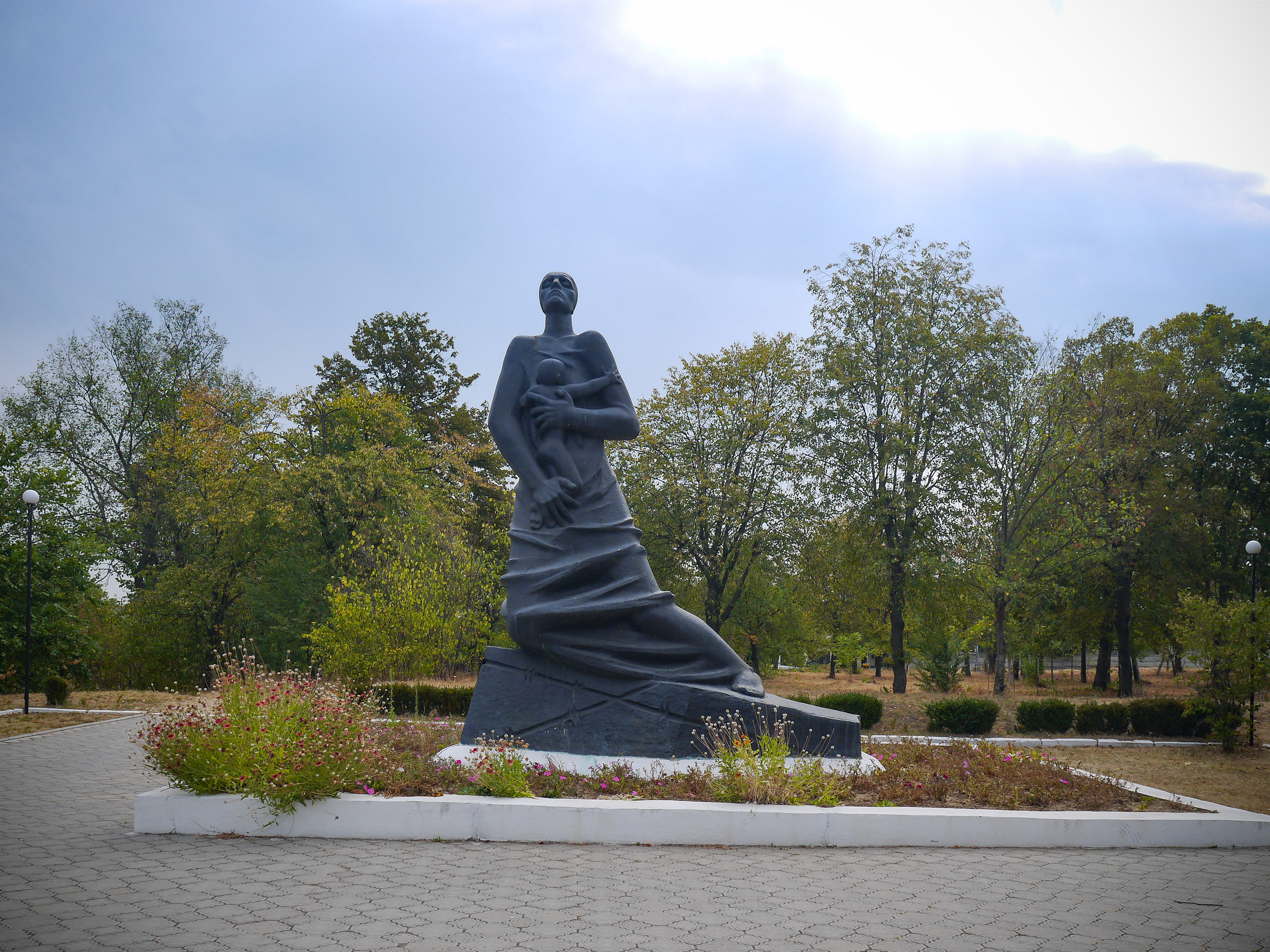
Monument to Holocaust & WWII victims in Gaysin

==== The Holocaust ====
During World War II, Haisyn was occupied by the 11th Field Army of the Wehrmacht on 25 July 1941. In accordance with the agreement signed on 30 August in Bender between the German and Romanian commanders, Haisyn, unlike Mogilev-Podilskyi, was not part of "Transnistria", but of the Reichskommissariat Ukraine. The occupation of Haisyn lasted almost 32 months. During this period, the German concentration camps Stalag 329/Z and Stalag 348 (March to August 1943) were located in the area. According to various estimates, during the occupation in the northeastern outskirts of the city (Belendijka tract) the Germans shot from 8,000 to 10,000 people, mostly local Jews and Jews specially brought there for extermination from other occupied areas. During the first mass shooting on 16 September 1941, about three thousand (according to other sources - 1,300) Jews were killed, and on 17 September another three thousand people were shot. In the following days, around four thousand Jews were shot, brought from the surrounding area. Shootings were also carried out in October 1941 and 7–10 May 1942. By the end of the occupation, about 20 Jews remained in Haisyn (less than 1% of the pre-war population). On 14 March 1944, Haisyn was taken back by units of the 232nd Rifle Division of the Red Army.

==== Late Soviet period and modern day ====
By 1970, despite the murder of Jews during the Holocaust, the town's population had recovered and reached 23,700. The bulk of the city's economy was in the food industry: it had a meat processing plant, sugar factory, fruit canning factory, and oil, cheese, and alcohol factories. There were also a clothing and furniture factory and a medical school. In January 1989, the population was recorded to be 25,766. Since then, the population of the city has stagnated due to brain drain and falling birth rates, and it was recorded at 25,855 in 2013.

== Population ==
Historical population
Year	Pop.	±%
1897	9,374	—
1926	13,766	+46.9%
1939	14,819	+7.6%
1959	17,680	+19.3%
1970	23,741	+34.3%
1979	24,470	+3.1%
1989	25,766	+5.3%
2001	25,640	−0.5%
2011	25,711	+0.3%
2022	25,698	−0.1%

=== Language ===
Distribution of the population by native language according to the 2001 census:

Language	Percentage
Ukrainian	93.01%
Russian	6.62%
other/undecided	0.37%

== Religion ==
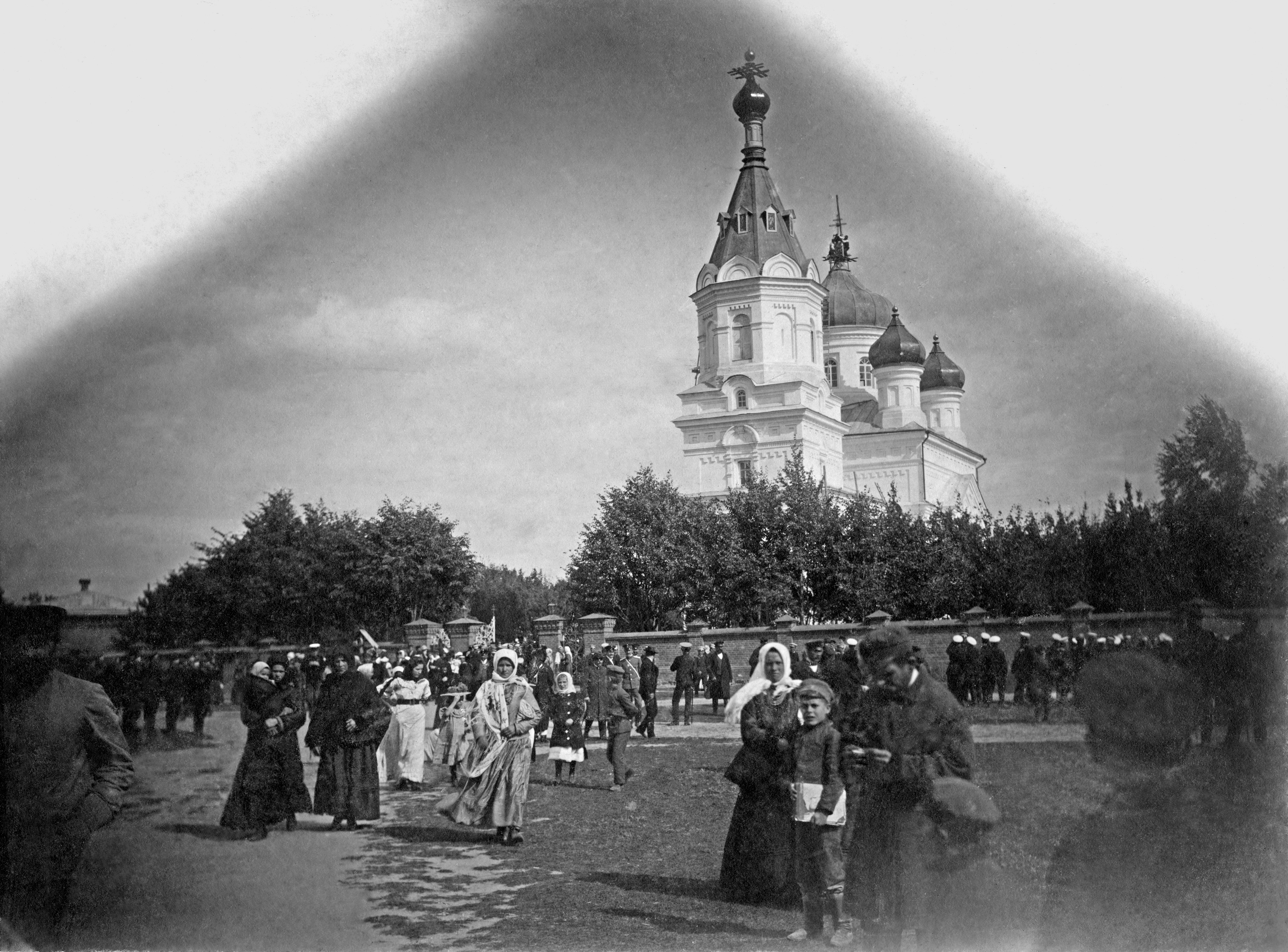
St. Pokhrovskaya Church, circa 1910s

The city no longer has a large Jewish presence, if any at all. The majority of residents are Eastern Orthodox, and the city is home to two churches: Holy Pokrova Church and St. Nicholas Church.

== Economy ==
Haisyn is a traditional centre of food industry, represented by branches such as sugar production, distillation of spirits and making of butter.

== In literature ==
- Haisyn is repeatedly mentioned in the works of Sholom Aleichem (see, for example: The Idle Wanderer, The Miracle on the Seventh Day of Tabernacles, There would have been a wedding, but there was no music, etc.)
- In "Duma about Opanas" by Eduard Bagritsky we find the lines: "How we walked in the wheel thunder, / So hot that the sky is hot, / Remember Gaisin and Zhitomir, / Balta and Vapnyarka"
- There are two memoirs about the city: "Children of the War" and "Gaisin's 'Crossroads'" by local native war journalist Sergei Borovikov
- In Yurii Andrukhovych's Lexicon of Intimate Mysteries, a chapter is devoted to Haisyn

== Geography ==
=== Climate ===
Climate data for Haisyn (1981–2010)
Month	Jan	Feb	Mar	Apr	May	Jun	Jul	Aug	Sep	Oct	Nov	Dec	Year
Mean daily maximum °C (°F)	−0.6 (30.9)	0.7 (33.3)	6.4 (43.5)	14.8 (58.6)	21.9 (71.4)	24.3 (75.7)	26.6 (79.9)	26.1 (79.0)	20.3 (68.5)	13.6 (56.5)	5.6 (42.1)	0.5 (32.9)	13.4 (56.1)
Daily mean °C (°F)	−3.6 (25.5)	−2.8 (27.0)	1.8 (35.2)	8.9 (48.0)	15.2 (59.4)	18.1 (64.6)	20.1 (68.2)	19.3 (66.7)	14.0 (57.2)	8.2 (46.8)	2.2 (36.0)	−2.3 (27.9)	8.3 (46.9)
Mean daily minimum °C (°F)	−6.4 (20.5)	−6.0 (21.2)	−1.9 (28.6)	4.0 (39.2)	8.9 (48.0)	12.4 (54.3)	14.2 (57.6)	13.3 (55.9)	9.0 (48.2)	4.0 (39.2)	−0.6 (30.9)	−4.9 (23.2)	3.8 (38.8)
Average precipitation mm (inches)	34.4 (1.35)	32.7 (1.29)	33.2 (1.31)	46.0 (1.81)	45.5 (1.79)	89.4 (3.52)	71.0 (2.80)	61.3 (2.41)	59.9 (2.36)	33.3 (1.31)	40.8 (1.61)	38.3 (1.51)	585.8 (23.06)
Average precipitation days (≥ 1.0 mm)	7.5	7.1	7.2	8.2	7.5	9.3	8.5	6.0	6.9	5.6	7.4	7.4	88.6
Average relative humidity (%)	85.4	83.1	78.7	69.6	67.3	73.2	72.6	71.8	76.6	80.2	85.7	87.4	77.6
Source: World Meteorological Organization

== Gallery ==
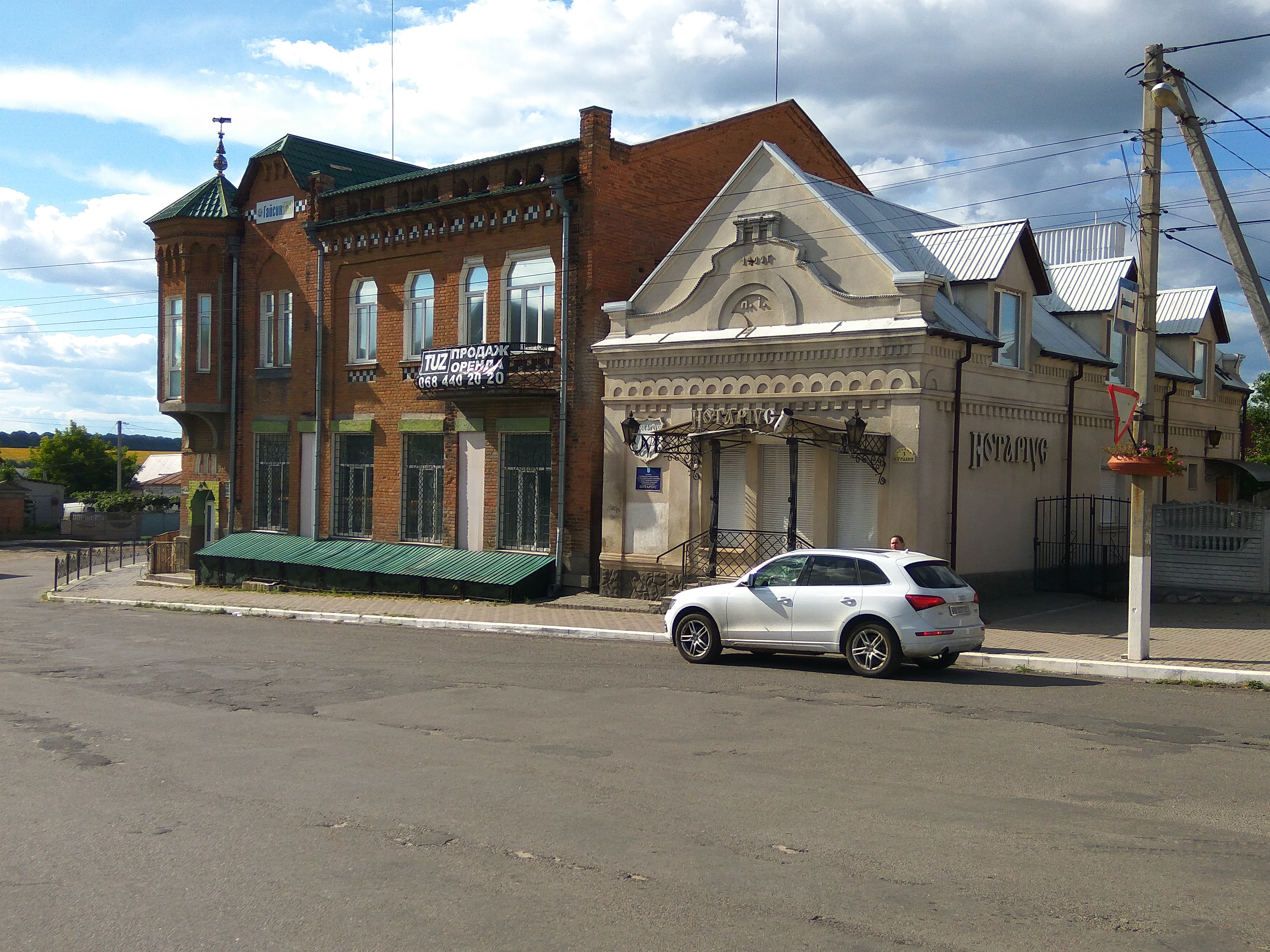
Former hotel building in Haisyn

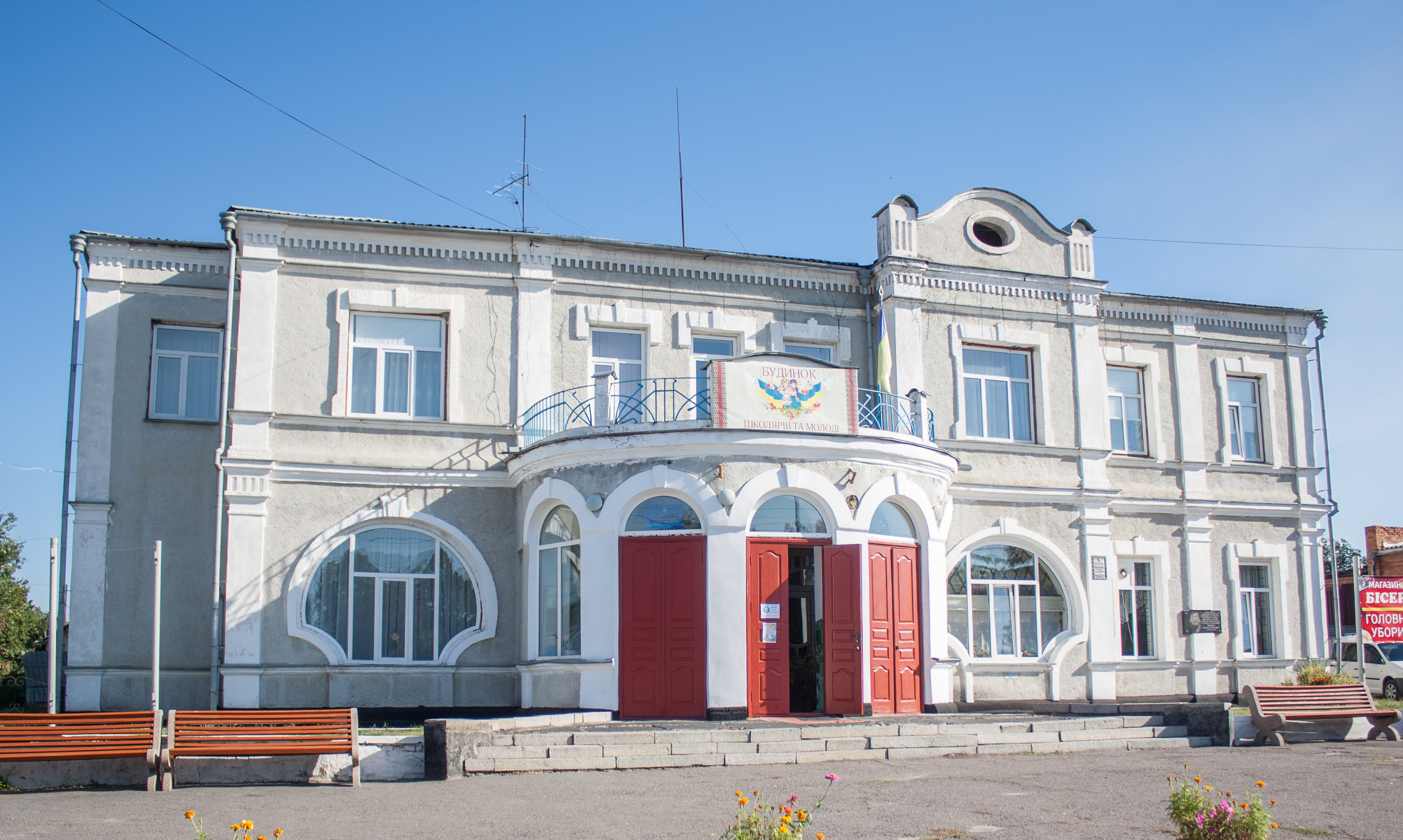
Historic villa

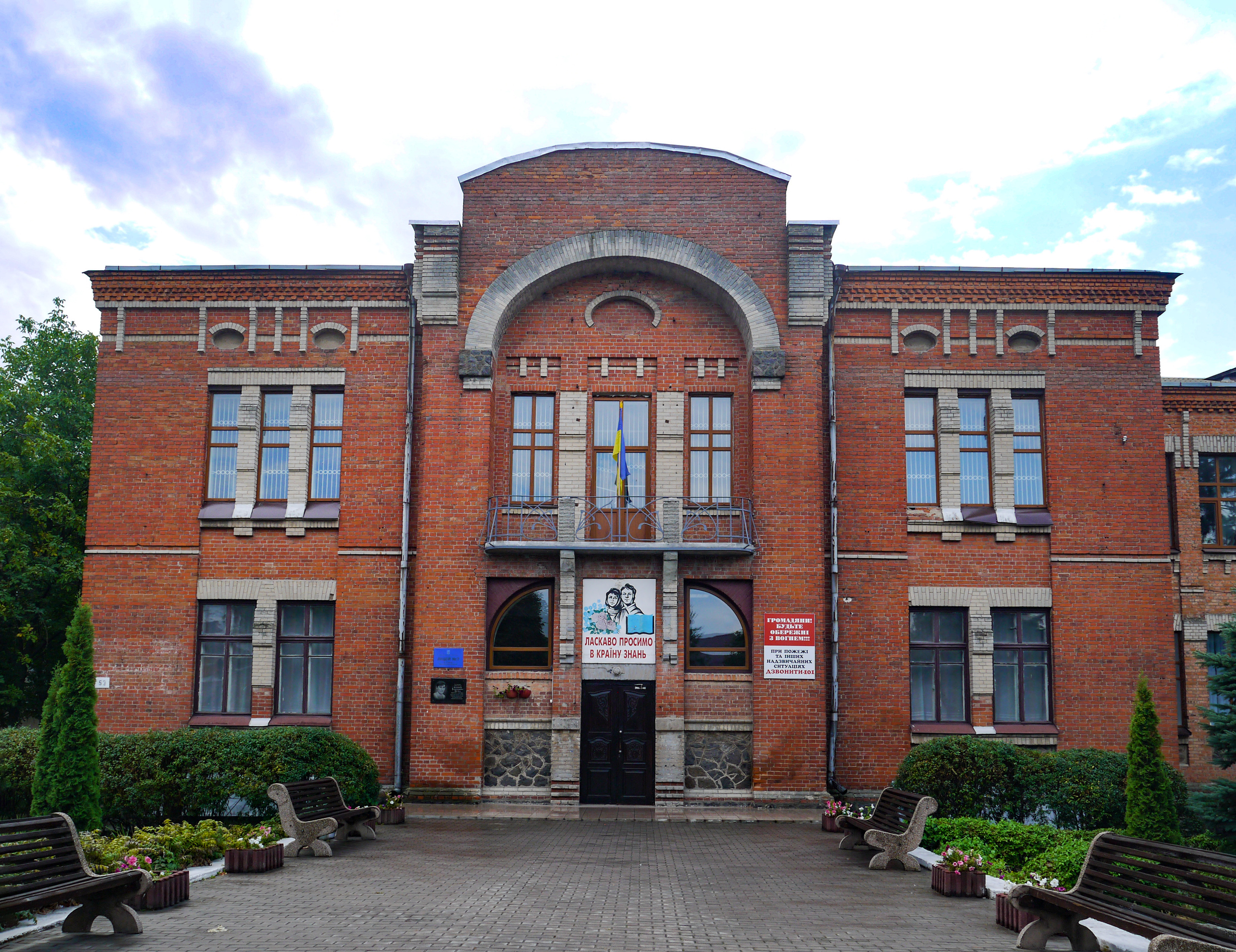
Haisyn gymnasium

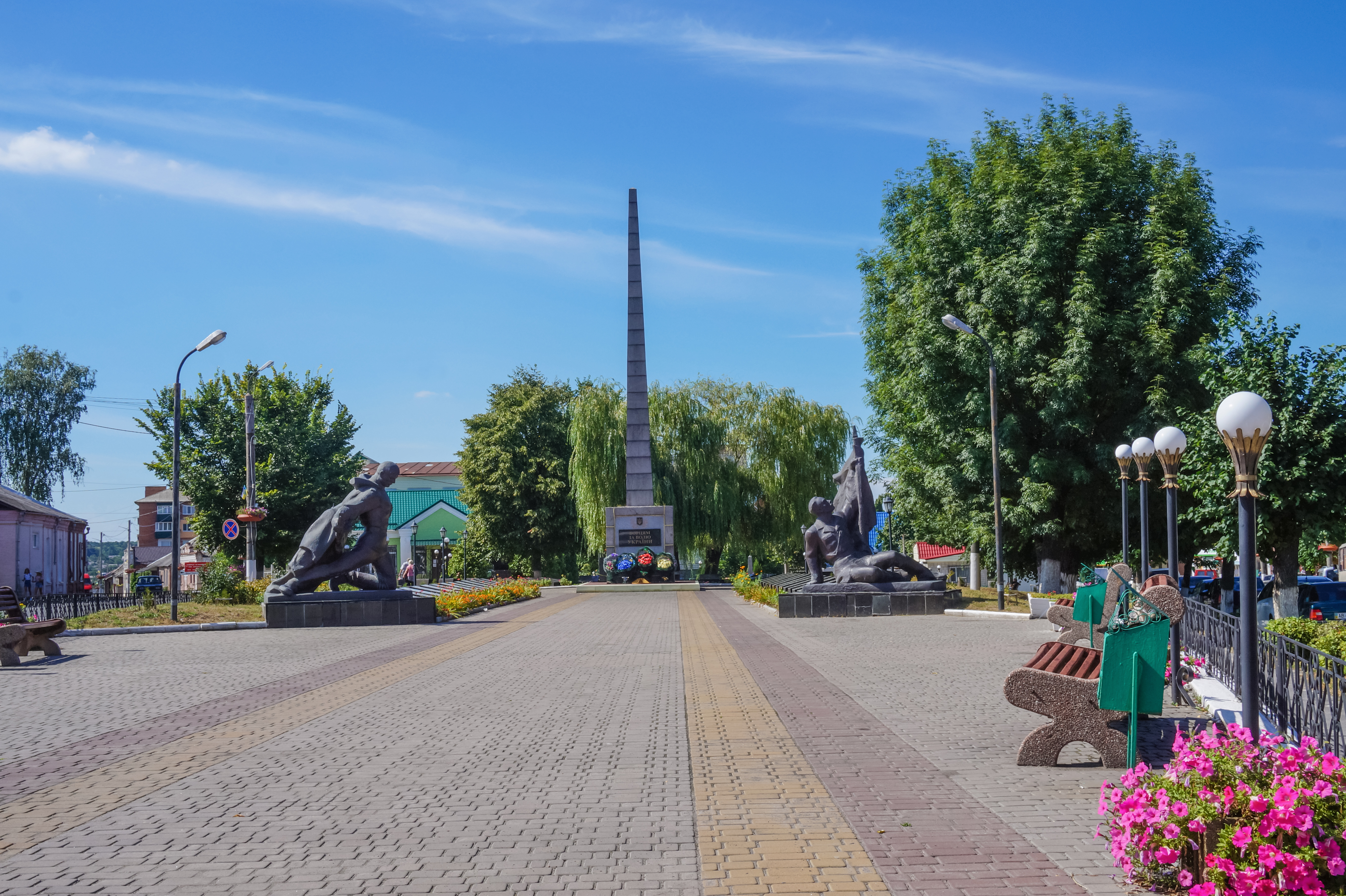
Second World War memorial

== Sources ==
- Вульфа, К. (1864). "Подольск. губ. Гайсинъ". Городскія поселенія въ Россійской имперіи (in Russian). Vol. 4. Томъ четвёртый. — СПб. pp. 45–46.
- Romanov (1866). Стат. временникъ Рос. имперіи (in Russian). St. Petersburg: Publication of the Central Statistical Committee of the Ministry of Internal Affairs.
- Гершт, А. (2000). 100 еврейских местечек Украины : Историч. путеводитель (in Ukrainian). Vol. 2. Saint Petersburg: Подолия Издатель.
