= Birkin (surname) =

Birkin is a surname, and may refer to several people from the same family of Birkin baronets:

- Andrew Birkin actor, screenwriter, and director; brother of Jane
- Anno Birkin, musician; son of Andrew
- Archie Birkin, British racing driver; brother of Henry
- Charles Birkin, British horror story author; 5th Baronet
- David Tristan Birkin, British actor; son of Andrew
- Henry Birkin, British racing driver; 3rd Baronet
- Jane Birkin (1946–2023), English-French actress and singer
- Richard Birkin (1805–1870), British lace manufacturer
- Thomas Birkin (1831–1922), 1st Baronet, lace manufacturer, son of Richard Birkin

The surname is also shared by the following unrelated individuals:

- Michael Birkin (executive), English businessman
- Edith Birkin, artist and Holocaust survivor

== Fictional characters ==
- Annette Birkin, fictional character from Resident Evil 2
- Rowley Birkin, fictional character from The Fast Show
- Rupert Birkin, fictional character from Women in Love
- Sherry Birkin, fictional character from Resident Evil 2 and Resident Evil 6
- William Birkin, fictional character from Resident Evil 2
- Shigeki Birkin (Badman) and Charlotte Birkin (Bad Girl) from the No More Heroes series

== See also ==
- Birkin family (Russian nobility)
- Kurt Birkins, American baseball player
- Birkin (disambiguation)
