= Alexander Birkin =

Alexander Birkin may refer to:

- Anno Birkin, (Alexander Birkin, 1980–2001), English poet and musician
- Alexander Birkin, (1861–1942) of the Birkin baronets

== See also ==
- Birkin (surname)
