= Birkin =

Birkin may refer to:

- Birkin, North Yorkshire, a village in North Yorkshire, England
- Birkin (surname), people with the surname
- Birkin bag, a handbag
- Birkin family (Russian nobility)
- Bentley Arnage 4.4L Birkin, a variant of the Bentley Arnage car made by Bentley Motors
- Birkin Cars, a South African car manufacturer of Lotus Super 7 replicas
