= Revision list =

Series of census lists of taxable population of Russian Empire

Revision lists (Russian: Реви́зские ска́зки, romanized: Revizskie skazki), are a series of census lists of the taxable population of the Russian Empire, taken between the early 18th century up until the end of the 19th century. The lists were taken to account and register information to collect poll tax to fund the Imperial Army.

The revision lists were lists of names (name, patronymic, and surname), ages, and relation to head of the household. Most revision lists contained both men and women, but summary tables did not include women.

In cities, the lists were compiled by representatives of the city government, and depending on if the lists composed included peasants, it would be tallied by landlords to include their serfs.

In periods between revisions taken, which were often irregular and far apart, the register sheets were often updated with supplemental information. The presence or absence of a person would appear in the supplemental registration, and would note status of people who had run off, been born, exiled, conscripted, or had died. Due to the period between revisions, a person was still considered legally alive until a revision updated their status, and their registration was changed, marking many deceased as alive "revision souls", which often increased taxes, as well as estate value, on a family. This became the plot of Dead Souls novel by Nikolai Gogol.

A total of 10 revisions were completed. Of these, the 1719, 1743, and 1811 excluded women from listings. The revision lists often took many years to finalize due to the size and communicative distance of the Russian Empire.

1858 concluded the final ever revision list, and would be followed up by the first and only All-Russia Census of 1897.

In the current age, the listing of the familial relations and locations on revision lists are considered important resources in Eastern European genealogy.

== Etymology ==
The Russian phrase "revizkie skazki" (lit. revision tale) is quite different from the English word "census", this is due to both words having a specific origin in the process of the conducting of a revision. After a list of taxpayers was assembled, it was up to the state officials to revise the list to account for the local households and their dependents. They did this by being told (as in, hearing a tale) from the local officials, rather than going to each house individually.

== Revisions ==
No.	Date of decree	Population count	Tax
1	26 Nov 1718	15,738,000	80 kopecks per man
2	16 Dec 1743	21,200,000	60-70 kopecks
3	28 Nov 1761	23,200,000	
4	16 Nov 1781	28,400,000	Some provinces allowed poor residents to pay in kind
5	23 Jun 1794	37,400,000	1 Ruble and 18 kopecks
6	18 Nov 1811	41,010,400	
7	20 Jun 1815	46,300,000	3 Rubles and 30 kopecks
8	16 Jul 1833	59,132,955	95 silver kopecks
9	1 Jan 1850	68,500,000	
10	26 Aug 1856	74,556,400	

- The 1st revision was carried out between 1718 and 1719 under the rule of Peter the Great by royal decree on November 26, 1718. The enumeration of the revision was delegated to appointed scribes, who were under direct supervision of zemstvo commissars. The revision was carried out under the supervision of military and divised revision commissars as well. During the revision, which was finalized for the most part by 1724, a total of 5.4 million "souls" of men. The census assigned landlords the title of "free men"^{[ru]} on their lands, which increased the population of counted serfs.
- The 2nd revision, conducted between 1743 and 1747 (although adjuncts were accepted until 1756), created a rule that established the enumeration of the population every 15 years.
- The 3rd revision was conducted between 1761 and 1767. The revision was the first in Russian history to be created without the use of supervising officers, relying on local and provincial offices to enumerate their constituent populations. The census also counted women for the first time, with a listing of their name, patronymic, age, and town of origin. Jews were included in this revision but not separately unlike later revisions.
- The 4th revision was conducted under direction of the Governing Senate. The enumeration of tales was delegated to uezd governors, lower zemstvo courts, and treasury chambers. Women, like men, had their ages record in indication to the current time, as well as compared to the previous revision.
- The 5th revision took from 1794 to 1808 to finish. It was conducted under the same rules as the 4th. This was the first revision to include Jews.
- The 6th revision was supposed to be taken during the year 1811, but was interrupted by the Napoleonic Invasion of Russia. Verification was not done, women were not enumerated, and the record did not account for all of Russia.
- The 7th revision continued the inclusion of women, and was conducted starting in 1815, taking 10 years to finalize. Women continued to be included, but did not have patronymics attached, a location of origin, or an age comparison to the last revision. This established the precedent of supplemental revisions not noting if a woman had died, fled, gone missing, or been exiled since the last revision. Men still had reasons for failure to appear listed. This revision standardized the format of men in a household being listed on the left leaflet, and women being listed on the right.
- The 8th revision took place between the years of 1833 and 1835. The Statute of 1833 lists more clear guidelines on the production and collection of local enumerations of people. The system of revision is only present in the 8th and 10th revisions. This revision established the use of comparing records of households on the lists to metrical books to check reliability of information. Women's patronymics were once again included in this revision.
- The 9th revision began in 1850, and excluded many Western provinces that had been enumerated between the end of the 8th and beginning of the 9th.
- The 10th and final revision was carried out between 1857 and 1859 according to the Statue for the production of the 10th national census. The census was the first to count the entire population of Russian-controlled territories, including Poland, Finland, Siberia, and the Caucasus. The number of serfs on this census counted over 23 million people, over double the amount of male souls counted. Two copies of each local census were made, with one being kept in local archives, and the other being sent to the national treasury. Siberian returns were permitted until 1899.

== Ethnography & class ==
The revision lists had different volumes that separated people by class and race.

Some examples of exclusive races and classes include:

- Jews
- Orthodox
- Gypsies
- Foreigners
- Clergy
- Gentry
- Peasants
- Artisans
- Merchants
- Wives of those conscripted
- Discharged soldiers

== Format ==
The following is a general format of a revision list header with queries translated and summarized into English:

Revision List 18[XX] [Day] [Month] [Name of Governorate, District, Town]
Assigned Family Number (No.)		Gender (Male on Left, Female on Right)	How old according to previous revision, and if arrival was since last revision	If not, reason for absence	Current
In previous revision	In current revision	Gender (Male on Left, Female on Right)	Ages	When exactly they moved or died	Ages

== Genealogical use ==
The revision lists are a useful tool in Eastern European genealogy due a lack of records in comparison to many Western European nations, which had already had a long tradition of documentation for vital records and censuses prior to the first census in Russia.

Coverage, especially in the later censuses, was quite thorough, but many enumerated copies of the family lists from the revisions have been lost throughout history, and many recently due to fires in local archives. For example, the 2003 Kamenetz-Podolsk archive fire.

== Gallery ==
Leaf of the revision list of the villages of Slavny, Shesky, and Kushalsky stan, Tverskoy Uyezd, Novgorod Governorate, 1763	Leaf of the revision list of the village of Kurnoye, Novograd-Volynsky Ueyzd, Volhynia Governorate, 1857	Fragment of 1782 revision list
