= Birkin family (Russian nobility) =

Birkin family Би́ркины
- noble family
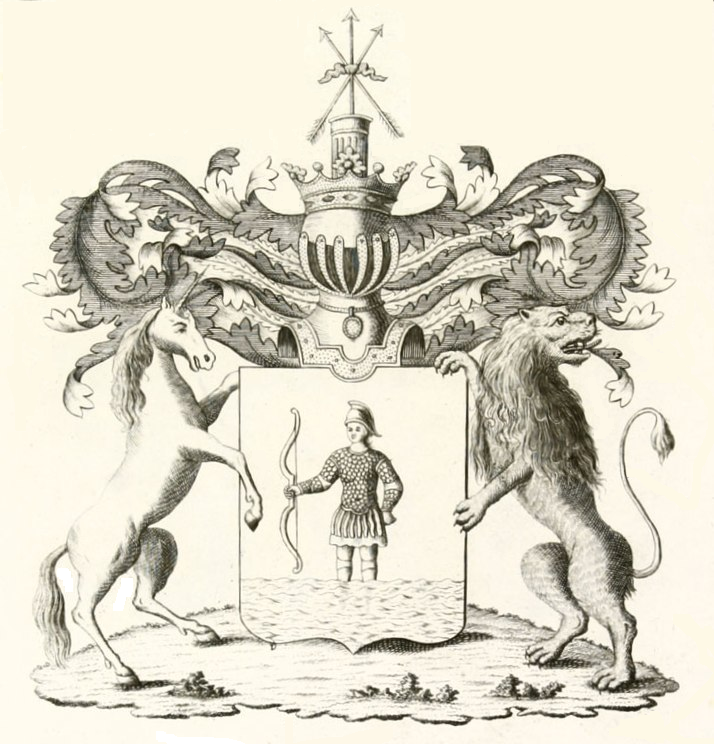
- Parent family: Chingisids
- Current region: Eastern Europe, Russia
- Origin: Golden Horde
- Founded: 1400s
- Founder: Bek Jaryk-oglan Ivan Ivanovich Birka
- Estates: Stolpovo, Zaraysky District Timofeevo, Zaraysky District Protasovo, Zaraysky District

The Birkin family (Russian: Би́ркины) is a Russian noble family originating with Ryazanian boyar scions. The Birkins were listed in the Velvet Book and the Part 6 (ancient nobility) of the Ryazanian genealogical book.

== Origins ==
Submitting documents for the Velvet book, the Birkin family claimed descent from the Chingisid warlord, Bek Jaryk-oglan (oglan was the title of male members of the Chingisid dynasty who were not in line for the khan of the Golden Horde), the ruler of the ulus (province) between the Dnieper and the Don. In 1387 and 1388, he was one of the leaders of the Middle Asian campaign of Khan Tokhtamysh against Tamerlane. In 1395, Bek Jaryk-oglan was defeated by Tamerlane near Kiev, after which together with his son, Berke, he fled to Duke Oleg of Ryazan, where they converted to Christianity under the names of Mikhail (Stepanovich) and Ivan.

According to P. Dolgorukov, the Birkin family owed their name to Ivan Ivanovich Birka, the son of the boyar Ivan Mikhailovich who served to Fyodor II of Ryazan. The alternative version of the family's name's etymology suggests the following definition: 'a stick with marks for measuring up levy or mortgage payment.'

== History ==
The first who actually bore the Birkin last name were the sons of Ivan Ivanovich Birka, Dmitry and Danila. The Birkins originally served at the court of the Dukes of Ryazan, but in the 1500s some of them had successfully turned to Muscovy. For example, Andrey Danilych Birkin was a warlord under Ivan the Terrible. Brothers Pyotr and Vasily Birkin were added in Ivan the Terrible's book of one thousand gentlemen chosen to the court (tysyatskaya kniga).

In 1583, Rodion Petrovich Birkin participated in a fraud aimed at seizing the hereditary estate of the Shilovsky noble family by forging the property transfer deed.

In the 16th century, some Birkins made it to the Moscow Duma, however, none of the family had ever been raised to the boyar rank. The Birkins served as various officials in provincial towns during the 16th — 17th centuries. Some of the family members were voivodes in towns. During the Time of Troubles, Ivan Ivanovich Birkin was among the electors of Michael Romanov.

In 1791, the Birkin family was added in Part 6 (ancient nobility) of the Ryazanian genealogical book. In the Russian Empire the family had gone into relative obscurity. Many of the family descendants ended up as merchants and odnodvortsy.

== Landed estates ==
=== Allods ===
- Tretyakovo, a village on the upper Poznanka river, Perevitsky stan (Lukhovitsky District, Moscow Oblast).
- Nikonova Slobodka (Glinki), a village in Perevitsky stan.
- Stolpovo, Perevitsky stan (Zaraysky District, Moscow Oblast).
- Ernovo, a village in Perevitsky stan, (Zaraysky District, Moscow Oblast)
- Timofeevo (Andreevo), a village in Petevitsky stan (Zaraysky district) – purchased from the Kobuzev family in 1601 by Ivan Vasilievich Birkin
- Protasovo (one half), Perevitsky stan, (Ozyory, Moscow Oblast).
- Klevny, Okolodorogny stan
- A half of the Dolgaya village, Kamensky stan, and Titovo, Perevitsky stan, — granted in 1614 in hereditary ownership.

=== Fiefs (pomestya) ===
- Kumanova Polyana (Fedosovo), Pekhletsky stan
- A half of Filatovo, Kamensky stan (Pronsky district).
- Varapovo, a village in Perevitsky stan.

== Notable members ==
- Vasily Grigoryevich Birkin was the garrison head (osadny golova) at Pronsk (1581 — 1583) and Ryazhsk (1585 —1592) and the voivode at Dankov (1587). He was one of the leaders of building Voronezh.
- Rodion Petrovich Birkin (d. 1589) was a garrison head at Pronsk. In 1587 — 1588 he was sent by Tsar Fyodor I to Kakheti, where he admitted allegiance of the local tsar Alexander II to Russia, which eventually was used as grounds for annexation of Georgia. According to Jerome Horsey Rodion Birkin was a favorite of Ivan the Terrible, and even happened to play the last chess game with him upon his death.
- Ivan Vasilyevich Birkin (d. 1643) was a dvoryanin at the Moscow Duma (since 1641); as a voivode he supervised the construction of Kozlov. In 1626 — 1631 he was the first minister (sudya) at the Patriarch's Ministry (partiarshy prikaz). In 1631 he was appointed yaselnichy (an assistant to the royal equerry).
- Ivan Ivanovich Birkin was the royal solicitor (stryapchy), the voivode at Arzamas and Nizhny Novgorod. He took part in electing Michael Romanov to the throne.
- Dmitry Gavrilovich Birkin (1819 — 1886) was a Russian lieutenant general (since 1878) and the chief engineer of the Kiev military district (1865 — 1874). He was awarded with the Order of the White Eagle.
- Lev Sergeevich Birkin (1852 — after 1917) was a vice-president of the Russian State Bank (1860 — 1890s), the head of the division of small loans (1904 — 1912), privy councillor and senator (since 1915).
