= Odnodvortsy =

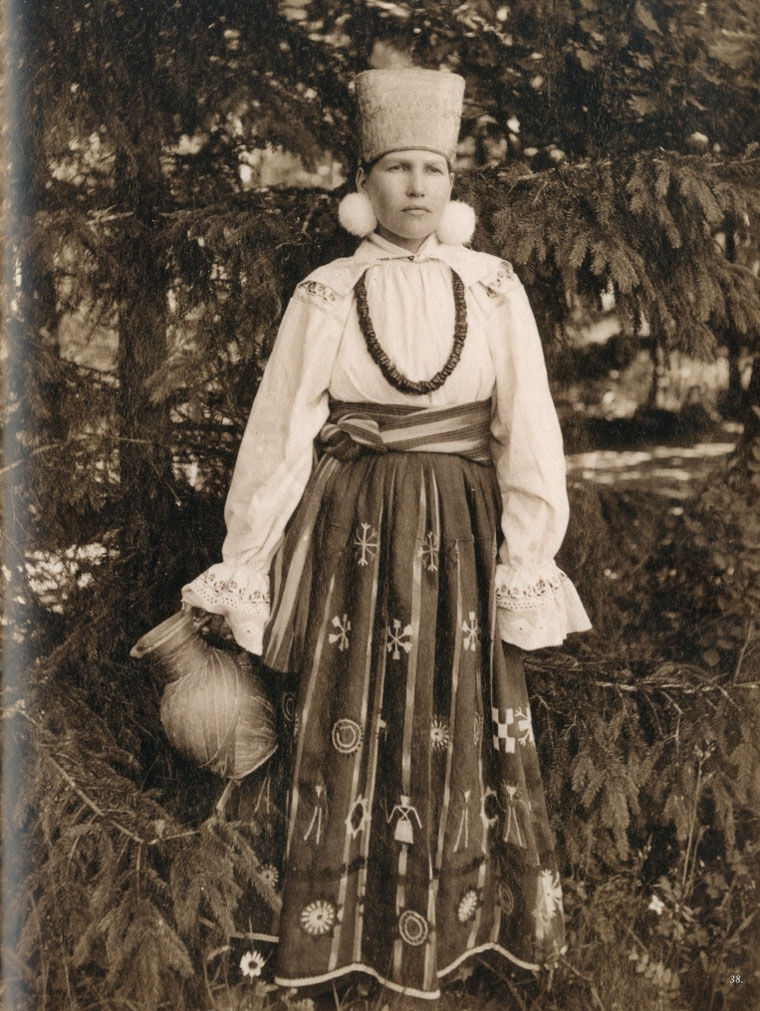
Odnodvorets woman from Kursk Governorate

Odnodvortsy (Russian: однодво́рцы) was a social group of the Russian gentry in the late 17th — mid-19th centuries. Those of this group who failed to prove nobility or regain it through the Table of Ranks were ranked with the state peasantry.

== History ==
=== Origins ===
The word odnodvortsy was first mentioned in the late 1500s. Up until the mid-17th century odnodvortsy was a temporary state of landed gentry (boyar scions) who did not have peasants on their estates. The word 'odnodvorets' (singular for odnodvorsty) literally means 'owning one homestead (dvor)'. Denis Lyapin pointed out that if, however, relations of a boyar scion had their own house on his estate, such a gentleman was not ranked as odnodvorets. The same applied if a boyar scion had a single bobyl (Russian: бобыль, i.e. a homeless man, who lost his house in a disaster or a war), who, though, did not have to work for the estate's owner.

The class of odnodvortsy was largely associated with the south of Muscovy. In the late 16th century, in order to protect the southern frontier from the Crimean Tatars, as well as from the Ukrainian Cossacks and Poland, Moscow government decided to establish a line of strongholds on the border with the steppe (the wild field): Belgorod, Yelets, Kursk, Voronezh, etc. The government started recruiting boyar scions, as well as anyone who expressed the desire to enter the military service, to the frontier fortresses (ukrainnye goroda). The newcomers comprised boyar scions, petty princes and common servicemen. Gentry, as well as some servicemen of the new model regiments (polki novogo stroya) received landed estates. However, the primary colonization of the region by gentry and servicemen brought about the situation of the severe lack of peasants. D. Lyapin pointed out in his study of the Yelets boyar scions, that as early as in the late 1500s, when Yelets was just being built, some of the local boyar scions were already without serfs, while at that time there was no record of peasants in the area.

The ratio of the gentry and peasants in the south of Muscovy was unstable up until the late 1600s. For instance, the Yelets desyatnya (a list of boyar scions) of 1622 stated 1256 peasants for 820 boyar scions. By 1678 the number of peasants in the area increased to 3500 as opposed to 1850 boyar scions. By the second half of the 17th century only 17% of the Yelets gentry had serfs, while 83% either were odnodvortsy and harvested their lands on their own, or did not have any land at all. In the Veliky Novgorod district by 1665 the serfless gentry made 15%, while landless one made 38%. At the same time, the gentry who had 1 to 14 peasant homesteads was considered small-landed.

The shortage of peasants resulted in a situation of mass absenteeism of boyar scions from service. For example, during the anti-Turkish campaign of 1677 the no-show boyar scions made 51%.

=== Odnodvortsy as a social class ===
In the first quarter of the 1700s the total number of odnodvortsy was only 453 men, while by the mid-19th century they had made one million.

In 1713 odnodvortsy of the southern frontier were organized in the so-called 'land militia'. In order to implement the reform, the communities of odnodvortsy were structured in the so-called 'slobods' headed by atamans, similar to Cossacks. Later they were managed by administrators (upraviteli) who collected taxes, represented the community at the central authorities, and organized the military duties. To assist the leader of odnodvortsy there were chosen 'the best men' of the community. They also chose sotniks and desyatniks — ranks functioning as the police. Sotniks were chosen from every 100 — 200 homesteads. Every sotnik had five desyatniks in his supervision. Sotniks were obliged to report to the authorities of every crime or wrongdoing in their territory. The sotniks and destyatniks were chosen in turn (called 'cherga'), so every family had their duty upcoming in due time. In 1747 odnodvortsy were forbidden to leave their communities without the permission of their administrator.

Odnodvortsy held special Volost assemblies in order to decide who would go in the military. If a family did not want to send their member in the army, they could hire a man for replacement. In the 18th century from three males in an odnodvortsy family, two were taken as recruits, and one left on the estate.

In 1738 Dementy Zarubin organized a great uprising in the Demshinsky district, Tambov Vicegerency, against recruitment in the land militia. The authorities organized massive persecution led by General Devits. Even when the dragoons entered their settlement, the inhabitants refused to give their leader away and organized defense at their homes. When Major Poluboyarinov announced the decree stating the odnodvortsy should get back to their service, they quickly attacked the dragoons, disarmed them and captured the major. In a few weeks, a larger troop headed by Major Mansurov was sent to 'drown the riot in blood', but all of the inhabitants of the village left it secretly prior to it. By 1739 Mansurov had put an end to the uprising. The prosecution took four years. About twenty men were arrested; fifty four men were killed in torture. Dementy Zarubin and another 19 men were sentenced to capital punishment, while 25 men were sent to a labor camp in Siberia (katorga).

After the annulment of land militia in 1775, odnodvortsy were enrolled as privates in the elite dragoon and cuirassier regiments, as well as in the Izmaylovsky guard regiment.

Serfs

Despite the origins of the term, some odnodvortsy did have some serfs who often lived with them 'in one household'. Up until 1840 odnodvorsty were allowed to officially have serfs, except for those living in the Northern regions and in the Smolensk Governorate. However, in 1786 odnodvortsy were levied capitation similar to peasants. Serf ownership amongst some odnodvortsy is explained by the following factors:

- some odnodvortsy were descended from landed gentry, i.e. boyar scions, dvoryane (a rank) or petty princes;
- in the 1700s, especially during the reign of Peter the Great, when every male member of landed gentry had to serve in the guards as a soldier, which implied large expenses and absence from the estate for years, some nobility voluntarily went in odnodvortsy to avoid the military service;
- some servicemen of the new model regiments, such as reiters, dragoons, some Cossacks, could receive estates inhabited by peasants;
- the right to enserf the prisoners of war.

Reclaiming nobility

In 1776 odnodvortsy attempted to petition Catherine the Great through the Legislative Commission (Ulozhennaya Komissiya). The odnodvortsy of Kozlov, Tambov Governorate, stated their ancestors, boyar scions, were settled in the 17th century on the southern frontier to fight Tatars. They complained that they were ranked lower than 'burgers and merchants', levied capitation and obliged to serve in land militia, and asked the tsarina to return them their former name of boyar scions. Belgorod odnodvortsy complained that even though they served in the military and had been to many battles, they were not freed from capitation, while in their absence wealthy landlords seized their lands, and they ended up homeless. They also brought up the fact of that some nobility gained this rank without having the due right, hailing from petty clerks and clergy, and having received this status for money rather than for descent. Belgorod odnodvortsy also emphasized the situation when one son, or brother, confirmed nobility, while the other was ranked with odnodvortsy. Another complaint regarded physical punishment.

In 1801 odnodvortsy were allowed to prove nobility. However, as soon as in 1804 the government tried to disallow those odnodvortsy who were suspected of avoiding service from confirming nobility.

After the division of the Polish–Lithuanian Commonwealth, due to the November Uprising of the szlachta against the Russian rule of Congress Poland, the Russian authorities decreed that szlachta that failed to prove nobility should get enrolled with either peasants or town residents (meschyane), or ranked with odnodvortsy. Since 1845 the odnodvortsy of the former Polish–Lithuanian Commonwealth were allowed proving nobility.

In the 1850s the Russian government started the policy that was to merge odnodvortsy with the state peasantry. The 1854 census officially graded odnodvortsy with the state peasants and laid the recruiting duty on them.

Until 1871, when universal military service was established in Russia, unlike peasants, who served for 25 years, odnodvotsy were obliged to serve for 15 years. Since 1816 odnodvortsy were allowed to pursue nobility only via service, while they could get a junior officer's rank in the 6-years time. They could receive their first under-officer rank in five years. Since 1874 odnodvortsy were allowed to enter military service as volunteers, and thus climb up the Table of ranks in order to regain nobility

=== Land ownership ===
As descendants of landed gentry and servicemen, odnodvortsy often owned hereditary landed estates measured in the units called 'chetverty' (cheti). On average the size of their lands was relatively small, ranging from a few hectares to 50 hectares. By 1724 their land ownership had been similar to formal gentry. Later, it was restricted by the government. In 1766 they were limited in land transfer rights allowing them to sell lands only within their class. Eventually, they were ranked with the state peasants and their lands were nationalized and considered 'state-owned lands'.

The lands of odnodvortsy were often seized by rich landlords, especially during the 1700s, when the country was ruled by royal favorites. The odnodvortsy who ended up landless could be enserfed by wealthy nobility.

=== Socio-cultural portrait ===
Odnodvortsy were marked for their close-knit community. Being impoverished did not let them marry into the official nobility, however, odnodvortsy looked down to common peasants, especially serfs. Many of them had their estates located next to the official gentry, sharing the same villages with them. Odnodvortsy had ended up living neck to neck with serfs. Great hostility between these two groups was expressed in the nicknames serfs gave them, such as indyuki (Russian: индюк; close to peacock), red blood, lapotnye kniazya (literally 'princes in bast shoes'), talagayi (dialectal: lazy bums), panki (petty gentlemen). As a result, odnodvortsy had a tradition of intermarriage, and many families are closely related.

Odnodvortsy who had serfs still harvested their lands. This fact ruined their reputation before both peasants and nobility who looked down to them, and poor landed gentry, in general. The 'Legal Herald' of 1833 made a publication on odnodvortsy who ended up as a peasants: 'The Starkov peasant family said their grandfather had seven serfs and worked with them in the field'. Unlike peasants, odnodvortsy kept arms in their homes: sabers, pistols, etc.

Apart from the background, the living conditions of odnodvortsy were little different from that of peasants. However, odnodvortsy often had very different household organization, house building traditions and even dialects.

Houses of the southern odnodvortsy were similar to the Ukrainian mazanki, a type of house constructed from smallwood framework and clay. However, unlike Ukrainians, odnodvortsy typically had wooden floors. Due to deforesting, in the 19th century the population of the Russian south began to use brick in construction. In this period houses of odnodvortsy were made of long two-storey structures with many apartments to accommodate families of male offspring. Another typical type of house for the southern odnodvortsy was the so-called 'five-walled izba' with a chimney, unlike those of most peasants, in whose houses smoke from the furnace went inside. Unlike peasants, odnodvortsy used imported pine timber for house building. Odnodvortsy put up high fences, sometimes made of stone, around their houses.

Women from the southern odnodvortsy were famous for their special striped or checkered skirts called 'andarak', similar to Lithuanian national costume. In the 18th century some odnodvortsy started to dress in the European fashion. Women were good housewives and cooks. Their families kept ancient dishes passed down to them from their ancestors, such as 'salamata', a thick soup made of milk and flour, that is traced back to the meal eaten by servicemen in long-distant military campaigns, and the cereal soup based on buckwheat, millet or wheat and flavored with lard or butter. Odnodvotsy also ate traditional noodles and thick milk porridge. They bred geese and turkeys which was later adopted by peasants.

== Notable people descended from odnodvortsy ==
- Mikhail Skobelev — a famed Russian general of the Infantry.
- Fyodor Ushakov — a famed Russian admiral.
- Ivan Dmitrievich Pashkov — the Kharkov governor (1788–1790).

== In fiction ==
- A Russian Gils Blas, or adventures of Prince Gavrila Semyonovich Chistyakov, a novel by Vasily Narezhny about a prince-odnodvorets and his adventures during the reign of Catherine the Great. The novel was written in 1814, but due to censorship it was first published only in 1938.
- Odnodvorets Ovsyannikov, a tale by Ivan Turgenev written in 1847.

== Literature ==
- Важинский В.М. Землевладение и складывание общины однодворцев в XVII веке. Воронеж. - «Издательство ВШИ», 1974. 421 с.
- Ляпин Д.А. Дворяне и однодворцы центральной России XVII в. (по материалам г. Ельца и уезда). /Д.А. Ляпин. // Рязанская область и Центральный регион в контексте российской истории: материалы межрегиональной научно-практической конференции. Рязань.- 2003. С. 189 -195.
- Ляпин Д.А. К вопросу о происхождении однодворцев (по материалам Елецкого уезда) /Д.А. Ляпин. // Наука в Липецкой области: истоки и перспективы: сборник тезисов и докладов. 4.1. Липецк. - 2004. С. 120 - 122.
- Ляпин Д.А. К проблеме происхождения южнорусских однодворцев. /Д.А. Ляпин. // Истоки: материалы межвузовской конференции аспирантов и студентов. Вып. 2. Липецк.- 2003. С. 28 - 31.
- Ляпин Д.А. Однодворцы и их участие в хозяйственном освоений Елецкого уезда в XVII в. /Д.А. Ляпин. // Верхнее Подонье: Природа. Археология. История. Т.2. Тула.-2004. С. 162 - 170.
- Новикова Ю. С. Традиционное жилище однодворцев в Омском Прииртышье//Вестник Омского университета. Серия «Исторические науки». 2015. № 1 (5). С. 62-64.
- Чуркин М.К. Однодворцы Черноземного центра как локальное сообщество (вторая половина XVIII - начало XX в.//Вестник Омского университета. Серия «Исторические науки». 2017. № 2 (14). С. 19-27.
- Esper T. Odnodvortsy and the Russian nobility//The Slavonic and East European Review. Vol. 45, No. 104 (Jan., 1967), pp. 124–134.
- Shaw D.J.B. (1990) Landholding and Commune Origins among the Odnodvortsy. In: Bartlett R. (eds) Land Commune and Peasant Community in Russia. Palgrave Macmillan, London. pp. 106–120.

== See also ==
- Russian nobility
- Boyar scions
