= Duma =

Russian assembly with advisory or legislative functions

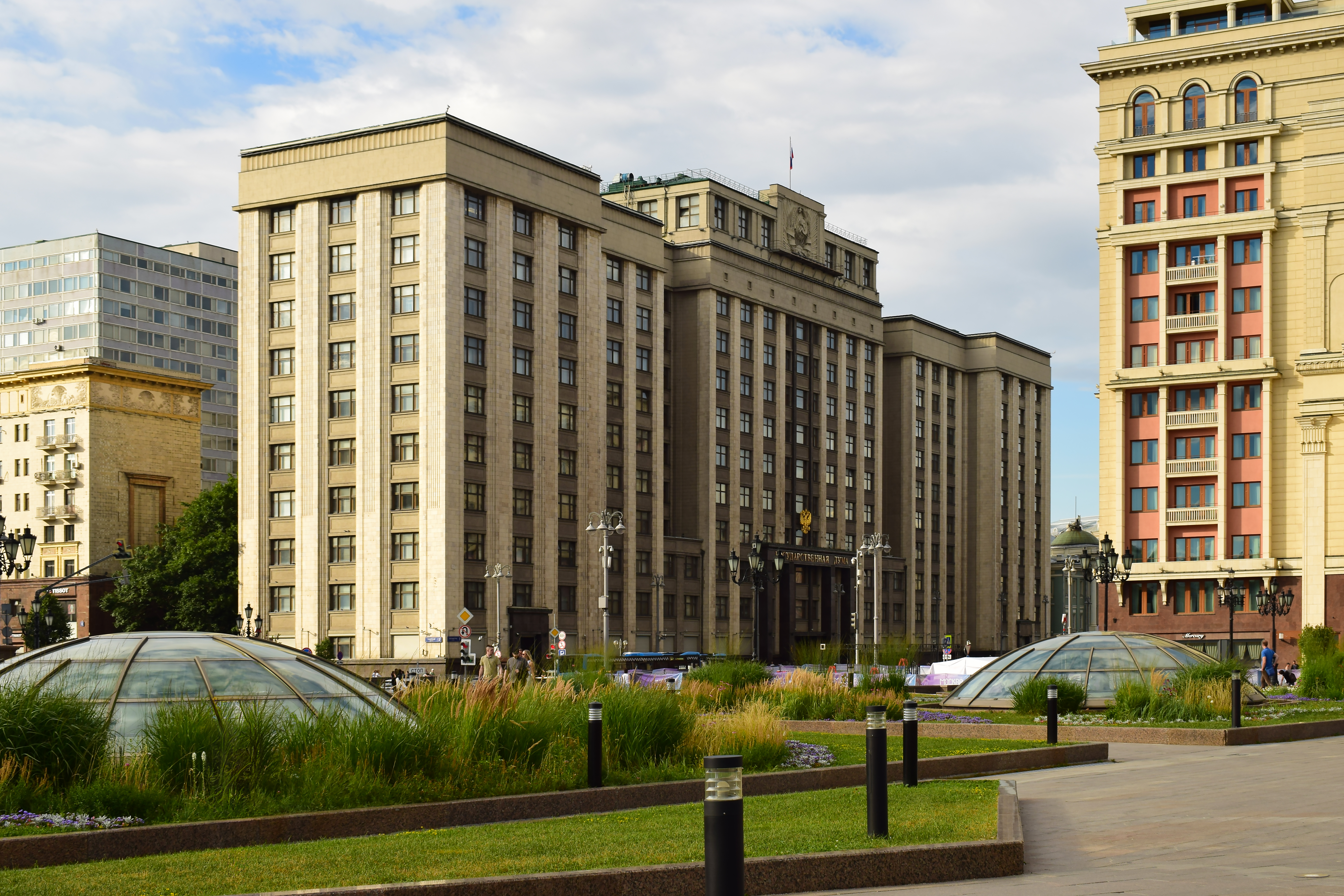
Building of Council of Labor and Defense, or "Gosduma" on Manezhnaya Square, Moscow

A duma (Russian: дума) is a Russian assembly with advisory or legislative functions.

The term boyar duma is used to refer to advisory councils in Russia from the 10th to 17th centuries. Starting in the 18th century, city dumas were formed across Russia.

The first formally constituted state duma was the Imperial State Duma introduced to the Russian Empire by Emperor Nicholas II in 1905. The Emperor retained an absolute veto and could dismiss the State Duma at any time for a suitable reason. Nicholas dismissed the First State Duma (1906) within 75 days; elections for a second Duma took place the following year. The Russian Provisional Government dissolved the last Imperial State Duma (the fourth Duma) in 1917 during the Russian Revolution.

Since 1993, the State Duma (Государственная дума, Gosudarstvennaya Duma) has functioned as the lower legislative house of the Russian Federation.

== Etymology ==
The Russian word is inherited from the Proto-Slavic word *duma which is of disputed origin. Its origin has many proposed theories that provide convincing evidence to support each proposed origin. Mladenov, Stender-Petersen: From Proto-Indo-European *dʰewh₂- (“to smoke”), akin to Proto-Slavic *duti (“to blow, to inflate”), *dymъ (“smoke”), perhaps originally meaning “breath, spirit”. Compare Ancient Greek θῡμός (thūmós, “soul, emotion”), occasionally also “thought, mind”. Vaillant: Contracted from hypothetical *douma < *do- + *umъ (“mind”) + *-a. Compare *douměti (“to comprehend”) (whence Russian надоу́мить (nadoúmitʹ, “to advise”)). Machek: From an inversion of root *mewHdʰ-, otherwise yielding Proto-Slavic *myslь (“thought”), Ancient Greek μῦθος (mûthos, “word, fable”). Also thought to be derived from Proto-Germanic *dōmaz. The word is also related to the Russian verb dumat′ (думать) meaning "to think".

== Boyar duma ==
The term boyar duma (боярская дума, boyarskaya duma) is used to refer to the councils of boyars (but not to be confused with (boyar scions) which advised the prince on state matters during the times of Kievan Rus' and the Tsardom of Russia (then tsar). In 1711 Peter the Great transferred its functions to the Governing Senate. Contemporary sources always refer simply to "the boyars" or to "the duma", but never to the "boyar duma". Originally there were ten to twelve boyars and five or six okolnichies. By 1613 the duma had increased to twenty boyars and eight okolnichies. Lesser nobles, "duma gentlemen" (dumnye dvoriane) and secretaries, were added to the duma and the number of okolnichies rose in the latter half of the 17th century. In 1676, the number of boyars increased to 50 – by then they constituted only a third of the duma.

== Municipal dumas ==
Under the reign of Catherine II, reforms to local government led to city dumas being established in Russian cities.

Under the reign of Alexander II, several reforms were enacted during the 1860s and 1870s. These included the creation of local political bodies known as zemstvos. All owners of houses, tax-paying merchants and workmen are enrolled on lists in a descending order according to their assessed wealth. The total valuation is then divided into three equal parts, representing three groups of electors very unequal in number, each of which elects an equal number of delegates to the municipal duma. The executive is in the hands of an elective mayor and an uprava, which consists of several members elected by the duma. Under Alexander III, however, by laws promulgated in 1892 and 1894, the municipal dumas were subordinated to the governors in the same way as the zemstvos. In 1894 municipal institutions, with still more restricted powers, were granted to several towns in Siberia, and in 1895 to some in Caucasia.

== State dumas ==
=== Russian Empire ===
Under the pressure of the Russian Revolution of 1905, on 6 August 1905, Sergei Witte issued a manifesto about the convocation of the Duma, initially thought to be an advisory organ. In the subsequent October Manifesto, Nicholas II pledged to introduce basic civil liberties, provide for broad participation in the State Duma, and endow the Duma with legislative and oversight powers.

However, Nicholas II was determined to retain his autocratic power. Just before the creation of the Duma in May 1906, the Tsar issued the Fundamental Laws. It stated in part that the Tsar's ministers could not be appointed by, and were not responsible to, the Duma, thus denying responsible government at the executive level. Furthermore, the Tsar had the power to dismiss the Duma and announce new elections whenever he wished. At this first meeting of the Duma members proposed that political prisoners should be released, trade unions given rights and land reform be introduced. Nicholas II rejected these suggestions and dissolved the assembly in July, 1906.

The imperial State Duma was elected four times: in 1906, twice in 1907, and in 1912.

=== Russian Federation ===
The State Duma (Russian: Государственная дума, Gosudarstvennaya Duma, common abbreviation: Госдума, Gosduma) in Russia is the lower house of the Federal Assembly of Russia (parliament), the upper house being the Federation Council of Russia. Under Russia's 1993 constitution, there are 450 deputies of the State Duma (Article 95), each elected to a term of four years (Article 96); this was changed to a five-year term in late 2008. In previous elections of 1993, 1995, 1999 and 2003 one half of the deputies were elected by a system of proportional representation and one half were elected by plurality in single member districts. However, the 2007 Duma elections were carried out in a new format: all 450 deputies were elected by a system of proportional representation. Russian citizens at least 21 years old are eligible to run for the Duma (Article 97).
