= Edith Birkin =

Czech-born artist and writer (1927–2018)

- Born: Edith Hofmann; 13 November 1927; Prague, Czechoslovakia
- Died: 20 September 2018 (aged 90)

Edith Birkin (née Hofmann; 13 November 1927 – 20 September 2018) was a Jewish artist and writer born in Prague, who spent her later years in Britain. She was a survivor of the Holocaust.

== Early life and war years ==
Edith Hofmann was born in Prague in 1927; in 1941, aged 14, she was sent with her family to the Lodz ghetto in Poland. Her parents died within their first year there. When the Lodz ghetto was liquidated in 1944, Birkin was sent to the concentration camp at Auschwitz where she spent the rest of her time there working in an underground munitions factory.

Birkin was liberated from Bergen-Belsen concentration camp in 1945, having survived a death march to the Flossenbürg concentration camp. She returned to Prague at the end of the war to discover that none of her family had survived.

It was really I think the worst time of the war. Although we were free and liberated, it was the very worst time because we realised, or I realised that nobody was going to come back, and that life is never going to be the same, and what I hoped for would happen after the war is never going to happen. The hope was gone.

Birkin wrote down her experiences shortly after liberation and in 2001 they were published in the form of a novel, Unshed Tears under her maiden name, Edith Hofmann.

== Art career ==
In 1946 Birkin moved to England, where she became a teacher and went on to adopt three children. In the 1970s she studied A-level History of Modern Art and went on to take a course in fine art. She painted a series of paintings in response to her experiences, and also written a book of poems titled The Last Goodbye, also published as Edith Hofmann. She described her work as expressing the "sense of loneliness or isolation experienced by so many".

Birkin died on 20 September 2018, at the age of 90.

== Collections ==
- Imperial War Museum
- Birmingham Museums Trust
- Ben Uri Gallery

== Exhibitions ==
- 1987 Anne Frank exhibition in Manchester.
