= Jaroszyński =

Jaroszyński (feminine Jaroszyńska) is a Polish surname. Notable people with the surname include:

- Karol Jaroszyński (1878–1929), Polish entrepreneur
- Paweł Jaroszyński (born 1994), Polish footballer
