= Stan (administrative unit) =

Historical administrative unit in Russia

Stan (Russian: стан; plural: ста́ны) was a historical administrative unit in Russia, except for Veliky Novgorod. Stans existed until the 18th century, but in some regions of Russia this name was applied to districts up until the early 20th century.

== History ==
Etymologically stan was formed from the verb stanovitsya (Russian: станови́ться) meaning to stay or stand. It has not been well-studied. However, Russian historians believe that unlike volost, which is thought to have evolved from tribal communities, stans were purely administrative structures, whose main function was to organize tribute collection, thus, a stan was the actual place where royal officials called tiuns and dovodchiks stayed in order to perform sovereign's will or collect taxes. Thus, in the largest locality of a certain area, they put up a house that was the place where an official should stay temporally. It is believed that unlike volostels who ran the volosts for a long period under appointment, stans didn't have permanent administrators. It is also pointed out that, unlike volosts, which were composed mainly of rural localities, stans were very connected to certain towns. Originally, stans and volosts existed simultaneously. In some provinces, stans and volosts were equal. In others, volosts could include stans, and vice versa. This fact makes it hard to give any certain viewpoint on the subject.

By the times of Ivan the Terrible (second half of the 16th century), stans had started to replace volosts in most Russian provinces (then called uyezdy), which is linked with the rise of centralization and suppression of local self-governance. For example, in Moscow and Dmitrov uyezds, stans were almost identical in name and geography to the former volosts.

In the 17th century stans domineered over volosts in size and number. At this time, often stans were a form of organization of nobility-owned lands, while volost - of royal lands. It reflects stan's historical connection to towns, which were primarily military strongholds, where local gentry gathered for service or actually served, while volosts remained communities of mostly free peasants, who had later become royal serfs.

Gradually, volosts had become subdivisions of stans.

In the 19th-early 20th century stans were a form of police administration. The decree of Moscow military governor from December 1, 1806, 'On town and land police' was first to use the new sense of the word stan, as a police unit and introduced the office of stanovoy pristav.

== See also ==
- Uyezd
- Volost
