= Boyar scions =

Rank of Russian gentry

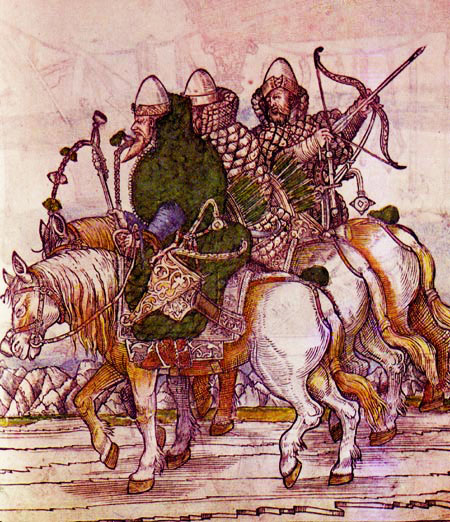
Boyar scions of the 16th century. A coloured engraving from the 1556 edition of Sigismund von Herberstein's book Notes on Muscovite Affairs.

Boyar scions (Russian: дети боярские, сыны боярские; transliteration: deti/syny boyarskie) were a rank of Russian gentry that existed from the late 1300s through the 1600s. In the late 1700s—early 1800s descendants of the boyar scions who failed to prove nobility or regain it through the Table of Ranks were enrolled within the social group named odnodvortsy.

== Origins ==
Boyar scions is one of the most controversial social categories in Russian history. They are the subject of two contradicting trends: some historians hold that the Boyar scions are genealogically connected with boyars, while the others claimed they were nothing else but randomly recruited low-ranked servicemen. For example, these completely opposite positions on the subject-matter were held in the 18th century by General Ivan Boltin and Prince Mikhail Scherbatov. Boltin claimed boyar scions were merely servants of boyars, while Prince Scherbatov insisted they were actually descendants of noble families, yet, for their poverty, belittled by the wealthier nobility.

The Russian-German historian, Gerhard Miller considered boyar scions descendants of junior princely druzhina. Dmitry Samokvasov considered them impoverished descendants of boyar families, yet he believed they were successors of the junior druzhina: gridi and detskie. This viewpoint was also taken by Nikolay Zagoskin. He made a thorough analysis of the Russian serving gentry in the period from the Kievan Rus through the 17th century. He believed that boyar scions could have to do with the category of the junior druzhina called detskie that evolved into 'deti boyarskie' in the 12th century. He also considered detskie the senior segment of the junior druzhina.

Zagoskin also had an interesting view of boyars. He refused the idea that boyar were initially a rank given by the prince. Instead, he believed boyars were distinguished lords who had superior standing in the community. Moreover, Zagoskin pointed to the division of boyars in the sources into senior and junior. He also noticed that the rank of boyar was formally introduced in the times of Ivan III, when the boyar duma was created, however as early as in the 14th century the rank of boyar was already mentioned.

Vasily Kluchevsky believed boyar scions were impoverished descendants of boyars who did not acquire the rank and served as average royal vassals. Thus he concluded that, by their status, boyar scions were the same as free servants (slugi volnye), yet of boyar descent. The 20th-century historian Vladimir Kobrin followed this point of view and believed that initially boyar scions were descendants of boyars who did not achieve the rank of boyars themselves. Ruslan Skrynnikov suggested that boyar scions could be junior members of the large and branched boyar families, who got impoverished because of divisions of their ancestral allods. The famous Russian historian Sergey Soloviev believed that boyar scions emerged as a result of the dissolution of the junior druzhina. Unlike boyars they were barred from the Duma. However, unlike other members of the druzhina, they were distinguished by aristocratic descent and had the right to leave their sovereign without losing the land.

The historian Mikhail Yablochkov noticed that between the 1300s and the first half of the 1500s, boyar scions made one social class together with boyars. However, not all of the boyar scions were privileged as to have a seat at the Duma.

Irina Mikhailova carried out a profound study of the servicemen in the North-Eastern Rus prior to the Tsardom period. She made a special review of the boyar scions. She had analyzed the historical documents and private legal acts, and concluded that, as a certain social group, boyar scions emerged only around the 1460s, when this term became a social rank. She had also concluded that in the late 16th century "boyar scions" already implied landed gentry in general, rather than actual descendants of boyars. In her study she pointed to the fact that amongst the boyar scions some were descendants of princes, while others were descendants of officials and even bonded servants, alongside actual boyars. Mikhailova made the following general definition of the boyar scions: ‘a category of serving gentry which emerged in the 14th ^{—} 15th centuries as a result of the dissolution of town communities and the military reorganization of the developing united Russian state’ At the same time, Mikhailova saw the development of their allodial land ownership in the division of communal lands and did not admit that the lands were granted by the princes on a large scale, because the Rurikids did not possess sufficient lands in private property.

Practically, almost every Russian noble family descended from the ancient Muscovite aristocracy had part of their ancestors in the rank of boyar scions.

== History ==
Boyar scions were first mentioned in the Chronicle of Novgorod in 1259. However, many historians believe those were actually members of the local boyar families. As a social group, boyar scions started to appear in the legal acts and documents in the second half of the 15th century. Nikolay Zagoskin noticed that boyars started to be associated with the Duma only from the reign of Ivan III, when the princely duma turned into the Boyar Duma. During the centralization process under the rule of Moscow in the late 1400s — 1500s, boyars of the formerly sovereign princes and archbishops were losing their status and acquired the collective name of boyar scions in the Moscow documentation.

Up until the late 16th century, boyar scions were a group of gentry just below the Moscow boyars but higher than dvoryane. Except for cases of felony, boyar scions were freed from the trial by the viceroys and were directly tried by the tsar's court.

Their main task was military service. However, they also occupied many offices and performed many important functions, yet lower than the members of the Boyar Duma, such as:

- taking part in the ceremonies at the royal court, including the royal weddings;
- diplomatic missions, including embassies and spying;
- supervising construction of fortresses;
- being voivodes and viceroys in towns and small regions;
- supervising governmental mining;
- resolving border conflicts;
- collecting tribute;
- negotiations with the Church;
- land survey;
- royal charters delivery;
- informing local population of royal decrees.
- heads of the Streltsy or Cossacks.

Boyar scions were free land lords. They had the right to choose their sovereign up until the 16th century. Thus in one such family, some members could be in service to the archbishops, while the others — to the dukes.

For a long time historians believed that boyar scions massively enfeoffed in exchange for military service, namely a prince giving away large lands in fiefdom to provide an army This was to explain the development of their land ownership. However, Irina Mikhailova, on the basis of many legal acts, proved in her study that boyar scions' early landed estates were allodial, yet of medium to small size (settlements (selo), villages, lands). She analyzed the boyar scions of the Seltsy Volost, in service to the Bishop of Moscow, and concluded that their lands were not granted but taken by the families independently of the princes or bishops. In the 1300s—1400s these families possessed lands ranging from one settlement (selo, i.e. a large unwalled settlement having a church) to eight settlements with multiple villages, woods and fields attached to them. In the 16th century the families of the local boyar scions became impoverished because the families had grown too large over generations, and tradition required them to divide properties among the children.

In the late 16th century, under Ivan the Terrible the institution of fiefdom (called 'pomestie') developed. The impoverished descendants of originally allodial families started to receive fiefs in exchange for service on the massive scale. The fiefs were meant as temporary landed estates to provide a living for a boyar scion, however, by the 17th century they were practically inherited and even given as dowries in marriages, yet they could not be sold. In the 18th century these fiefs had turned into private land properties with all due rights.

Since the 15th century, the boyar scions gradually evolved into two sub-ranks: ‘gorodovye’ (enlisted with the ‘serving town’) and ‘dvorovye’ (candidates to service at the Moscow court). Zagoskin believed that the rank of gorodovye boyar scions evolved from those boyar scions who settled in towns and were not directly connected with the princes. Kozlyakov believes that until the mid-1500s the ‘gorodovye’ boyar scions could make it to the Moscow court The situation had changed with the Tysyatskaya Kniga (the Book of one thousand) established in 1550 by Ivan the Terrible, when one thousand members of nobility, both high aristocracy and landed gentry, were chosen for the Moscow court. It is noteworthy that members of the same family, sometimes even brothers or father and son, could serve in different ranks. The key factors to the higher rank of dvorovoy boyar scion or even vybor (literally, 'selection' to the court) were condition of one's armour and armament of servants, service of one's father or close male relations, the record of personal or family's reputation in service or social behavior. The higher rank implied more complex or long-distant military duties, including taking part in military campaigns, which most impoverished boyar scions could no longer provide.

Since the 1550s, from every 100 chets (about 50 hectares) of the 'good tillable land in one field' a boyar scion had to provide one warrior on a decent horse and in full armor, and with an extra horse for long-distant campaigns.

Throughout the 16th century, boyar scions started service at 15, but in the 17th century the age was raised to 17–18. Achieving due age, boyar scions received land allotments (pomestnyi oklad) according to their economic conditions, service and rank. Then they were to get enfeoffed by petitioning the tsar. However, often the actual size of land was much smaller than anticipated. They could also receive monetary allotments, however, actual payments were irregular and often only occurred before major military campaigns. Elder grown-up sons usually received separate landed estates, while younger sons of old and decrepit fathers were allowed to stay with them and inherited the paternal estates.

The boyar scions were listed in the so-called desyatnyas, i.e. special books made during military inspections, that contained review of the local gentry's serving potential (number of armed servants they could provide, armor, horses, etc.), enrollment of young or new boyar scions, allotment of landed estates.

Denis Lyapin paid attention to the significant role of the boyar scions in the development of the Russian southern frontier in the late 16th-early 17th centuries. He also noticed that boyar scions there outnumbered peasants and generally, despite quite large estates they might receive, many ended up without serfs. This was the main reason why the region was especially known for the prevalence of odnodvortsy, a word that originally stood for boyar scions that temporarily found themselves with no serfs on their land. Ruslan Skrynnikov emphasized the major role of the southern Muscovite gentry lacking in land and serfs in the turbulent events of the 17th century: the Time of Troubles and the uprising of 1648. According to Lyapin, who made a special study of the boyar scions in Yelets, they were recruited from such regions as Ryazan, Tula, Oryol and Novosil, while there were allowed only those boyar scions who did not actively serve themselves, but represented their relations: fathers, brothers and uncles.

Living in the south was very tough. Regular attacks of the Crimean Tatars left many families of the gentry devastated. Some boyar scions became servants of wealthier aristocracy, while others had to seek shelter with neighbors. For example, boyar scion Yuriy Molyavin from Mtsensk made a petition in 1593 in which he stated that his father was killed in action by Tatars in 1592, the Tatars burned down their estate and captured the peasants. He had to seek shelter with his mother in the nearby Novosil, and settled in a separate homestead on the estate of the local boyar scion, S. Frolov, who hired him as a servant. Molyavin was enrolled with the new town of Yelets, but Frolov refused to free his mother. Only governmental involvement resolved the conflict.

Most of the southern Muscovite gentry were small-landed and had few serfs. According to V. Glaziev, the average number of peasant homesteads per a gentry family in the Russian south in the 17th century was only five. Vorobiev raised the question of gentry's role in the development of serfdom in the 17th century. He had concluded that in the south most gentry had so few serfs, while some boyar scions did not have any personal estates, while being constantly absent on the military service, that they hardly were the main factor in enslaving peasants. Because of the lack of peasants, the local authorities attempted to force boyar scions to participate in building the fortresses and even plowing the steppe, despite the prohibition of the central government. The hardship of the southern living made many boyar scions avoid the service, while some people of ignoble background tried to get enrolled with the local gentry. However, the decree of 1601 prohibited giving landed estates to those who did not belong to boyar scions. There was the opposite trend, though, when boyar scions became peasants.

The dvorovye boyar scions together with the 'Moscow residents' (Moskovskie zhiltsy) had evolved into the new class of 'dvoryanstvo', while the gorodovie boyar scions continued to decline and many entered the new model regiments, i.e. streltsy, Cossacks, cannoneers, reitars, dragoons, lancers, and soldiers. Later, in the 18th century this group of former boyar scions formed the class of odnodvortsy, while those boyar scions of the both ranks who kept serfs on their estates managed to confirm their nobility.

== See also ==
- Boyar
- Russian nobility
- Odnodvortsy
- Russian rank titles during the sixteenth and seventeenth centuries

== Literature ==
1. Глазьев В.Н. Дворяне и дети боярские в Центральном Черноземье: роль в местном самоуправлении в XVII /В.Н. Глазьев // Социальная история Российской провинции в контексте модернизации аграрного общества. Тамбов - «Издательство ТГУ», 2002. С. 234–238;
2. Ключевский В.О. История Сословий России.// http://dugward.ru/library/kluchevskiy/kluchevskiy_ist_sosloviy.html
3. Загоскин Н.П. Очерки организации и происхождения служилаго сословия в до-петровской Руси: изследование кандидата прав Николая Загоскина. — Казань: в Университетской тип., 1875.
4. Ляпин Д.А. Дети боярские Елецкого уезда в конце XVI - XVII вв./диссертация на соискание степени кандидата исторических наук. Воронеж, 2006.
5. Ляпин Д.А. Дети боярские Елецкого уезда в XVII в: права и обязанности. /Д.А. Ляпин. // Вестник ЕГУ. Вып. 2. Серия: право. Елец.- 2003. С. 28–36;
6. Ляпин ДА. Елецкие дети боярские в конце XVI в. / Д.А. Ляпин. //Социальная история российской провинции в контексте модернизации аграрного общества: материалы международной конференции. Тамбов. - 2003. С. 241–244;
7. Михайлова И.Б. Служилые люди северо-восточной Руси в XIV-первой половине XVI века. Изд-во Санкт-Петербургского гос. университета, 2003
