= Ukrainian Volunteer Service =

Ukrainian Volunteer Service or UVS (Ukrainian: Українська Волонтерська Служба, romanized: Ukrainska Volonterska Sluzhba or УВС) — is a Ukrainian public organization that was founded in Odessa in 2017 by Anna Bondarenko. On August 11, 2017, the organization was officially registered. Currently, the organization's community consists of more than 200,000 volunteers, including Volunteer Agents, School Volunteer Agents, graduates of other programs, as well as local volunteers who help in their hometowns.

== Description ==
One of the first projects was "Volunteering School Lesson". Then Terekhova Tetyana, Olga Rudneva and other well-known opinion leaders, philanthropists and volunteers from various fields visited 30 schools in Kyiv, Odesa, and Lviv. They held meetings for students of grades 10-11, where they told how high school students can join volunteering.

In 2018, the "Volunteer Agents" project started, which operates with the support of the National Fund for Democracy. Fifty volunteers across the country began to develop local volunteer communities and help in various areas.

Since 2018, the UVS has been cooperating with the Ministry of Youth and Sports and the State Institute of Family and Youth Policy, overseeing the "Youth Worker" program and developing qualification trainings and educational programs for it.

In 2019, the UVS created an Analytical note on the state of volunteering in Ukraine, as well as a number of recommendations, which were handed over to the then Minister of Culture Volodymyr Borodyanskyi.

After the start of the pandemic, in March 2020, the Volunteer Center for Assistance during the coronavirus pandemic was launched. The aim of the center was to help people who were left alone and could not move freely due to quarantine restrictions. People left inquiries through the hotline, and volunteers delivered food and medicine. Thanks to the center, more than a thousand people received the necessary help from volunteers.

In June 2020, the Ukrainian Volunteer Service and the United Nations Children's Fund (UNICEF) in Ukraine launched the "My Phone Friend project". The goal of the project is to connect volunteers and wards in phone conversations, establish trust between generations and inform about true things, dispelling fakes. During the two years of the project, more than 9,500 volunteers became telephone friends.

In 2021, the National Volunteer Platform was launched - a resource created to find volunteer opportunities and scale the volunteer movement. The project was created jointly with the United Nations Children's Fund (UNICEF) in Ukraine and the SoftServe company, and is implemented with the support of the Ministry of Youth and Sports of Ukraine.

On April 9, 2021, the Ukrainian Volunteer Service signed a memorandum with the Ministry of Youth and Sports in Ukraine and the United Nations Children's Fund UNICEF of Ukraine on the commitment to the development of the "Volunteer Platform" and, therefore, support for youth volunteering in Ukraine.

In 2022, after the full-scale invasion of the Russian Federation on the territory of Ukraine, the Headquarters of the Ukrainian Volunteer Service is the direction of the organization's work, within the framework of which the team coordinates volunteer and humanitarian aid in Ukraine during the war. The main tasks of the headquarters include: to help and support Ukrainians during the war, to strengthen the state, public organizations, foundations and initiative groups through the mobilization of volunteers, to increase the awareness of the Ukrainian society about the methods of effective assistance, safety and rules of volunteering during the war. Since the first days of the war, the Volunteer Hotline, which works in the format of a Telegram bot, has been operating in the organization.

== See also ==
- Anna Kurkurina, Volunteer service member and animal rescue advocate
- Ukrainian volunteer battalions
- International Legion (Ukraine)

== Links ==
- Волонтерська Платформа — ресурс для пошуку можливостей волонтерства
- Паляниця.інфо — ресурс для пошуку волонтерської та гуманітарної допомоги
- Інтерв'ю із засновницею Анною Бондаренко
