= War Tails =

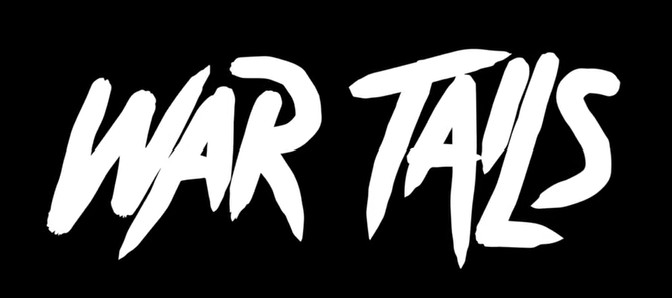
- Directed by: Olha Byrledianu
- Written by: Olha Byrledianu
- Produced by: Daniel Fine
- Starring: Khrystyna Drahomaretska
- Edited by: Bryce Iwaschuk
- Music by: Piotr Nowotnik
- Release date: June 1, 2024 (Seattle Film Festival)
- Country: Canada
- Language: English

War Tails is a 2024 documentary film about the efforts to rescue animals left behind as their human families escape war in Ukraine. Filmed in Ukraine and produced in Canada, the film was directed by Olha Byrledianu, produced by Daniel Fine and Tana Axtelle. It features Krystina Dragomaretska, an architect-turned-volunteer who leads animal rescue missions on the front lines of the Russian invasion.

War Tails is available for streaming on Amazon Prime.

== Critical response ==
"The love of animals, especially as in Dan and Krystina’s cases, dogs, transcends boundaries. Heroes like these emerge from their choices, which often involve sacrifice, courage, resilience, and unwavering commitment to doing what is right." Nina May, Wunderdog Magazine.

"In the movie, Axtelle and Fine — co-founders of the Ukraine War Animals Relief Fund (UWARF) — bring this critical issue to light, demonstrating the power of compassion and the urgent need for action." MLT News.

"Watching War Tails left me deeply moved. As a military member with a profound love for dogs, I couldn’t help but feel conflicted. It’s impossible to ignore the broader implications of war, not just for humans but for the countless voiceless beings caught in its crossfire." Theresa Carpenter.

“It's not possible to see an abandoned dog in a bombed-out building quivering with fear at the sound of explosions without being moved to tears, nor is it possible to remain dry-eyed by the sight of the same dog coming alive with the care and attention of the vets and volunteers of the Ukraine War Animal Fund. While mostly focused on the rescue of stray animals, it also works as a powerful reminder of just how inhumane and brutal this war perpetrated by Russia has been for the people of Ukraine. The innumerable abandoned animals are shadowed by the untold human tragedies and atrocities that led their owners to flee”. A Review by David Jackson, for BAFTA Qualifying Cambridge Film Festival, 2024.

== Awards and nominations ==
- Nominee, Best International Documentary Film, Seattle Film Festival, 2024
- Winner, Seattle Filmmaker Feature Film Award, Seattle Film Festival, 2024
- Winner, Audience Choice, Seattle Film Festival, 2024
- Winner, Feature Film Award, Documentaries Without Borders International Film Festival, 2024
- Winner, Original Composition for a Documentary, Australian Music Awards, 2024
- Winner, Feature Film Award, S.O.F.A Tails, 2024
- Winner, Feature Film Award, Bridge of Peace Film Festival, 2024
- Finalist, Feature Film Award, BAFTA Qualifying Cambridge Film Festival, 2024
- Finalist, Feature Film Award, Global Peace Film Festival, 2024
- Finalist, Best Editing, Anatolia International Film Festival, 2024
- Jury Special Mention, Feature Film Award, KO International Ethnographic Film Festival, 2024
- Honourable Mention, Feature Film Award, Bobritsa Film Festival, 2024
- Selection, Symbiotic Film Festival, 2024
- Selection, Dispatches of War – Selection, 2024
- Selection, Santa Fe Film Festival, 2025
- Selection, Wallachia International Film Festival, 2025
- Selection, PTAKH - Ukrainian Film Festival in UK, 2025
- Selection, Vancouver International Mountain Film Festival, 2025
- Bronze Winner, Honoring impactful documentary storytelling, The Telly Awards, 2025

== See also ==
- Anna Kurkurina, Ukrainian animal rescue volunteer
