= Battle of Kramatorsk =

2014 Ukraine-Russia battle

- Part of the War in Donbass
- Map of the DPR withdrawal of cities, including Kramatorsk
Date	12 April – 5 July 2014 (2 months, 3 weeks and 2 days)
Location	Kramatorsk, Donetsk Oblast, Ukraine
Result	Ukrainian victory

Belligerents
Ukraine	Donetsk People's Republic

Commanders and leaders
(Ukraine) Vasily Krutov	Igor Strelkov

Units involved
Armed Forces of Ukraine; Ground Forces; Air Force; Airmobile Forces; 95th Airmobile Brigade; 25th Airborne Brigade; Internal Affairs Ministry: Militsiya (Police); Security Service of Ukraine	Donbass People's Militia

Casualties and losses
8 soldiers killed 5 policemen captured 5 APCs destroyed 6 APCs captured 1 mortar carrier destroyed 1 Mi-8 helicopter destroyed 1 An-2 plane destroyed	60+ separatists killed 3+ separatists captured
- 11 civilians killed

A series of armed skirmishes and confrontations between the Armed Forces of Ukraine and pro-Russian separatists affiliated with the Donetsk People's Republic took place from 12 April until 5 July 2014, and is known as the Battle of Kramatorsk.

During the rising unrest in Ukraine in the aftermath of the 2014 Ukrainian revolution, the city of Kramatorsk in Donetsk Oblast came under the control of the breakaway Donetsk People's Republic on 12 April. In an effort to retake the city, the Ukrainian government launched a counter-offensive against the separatists, who had taken up positions in the city. Over the next several months there would be a series of incidents, skirmishes, and armed confrontations between the sides.

The DPR army units withdrew from the city on 5 July, allowing Ukrainian forces to sweep in and recapture the city, ending the standoff.

== Background and Events ==
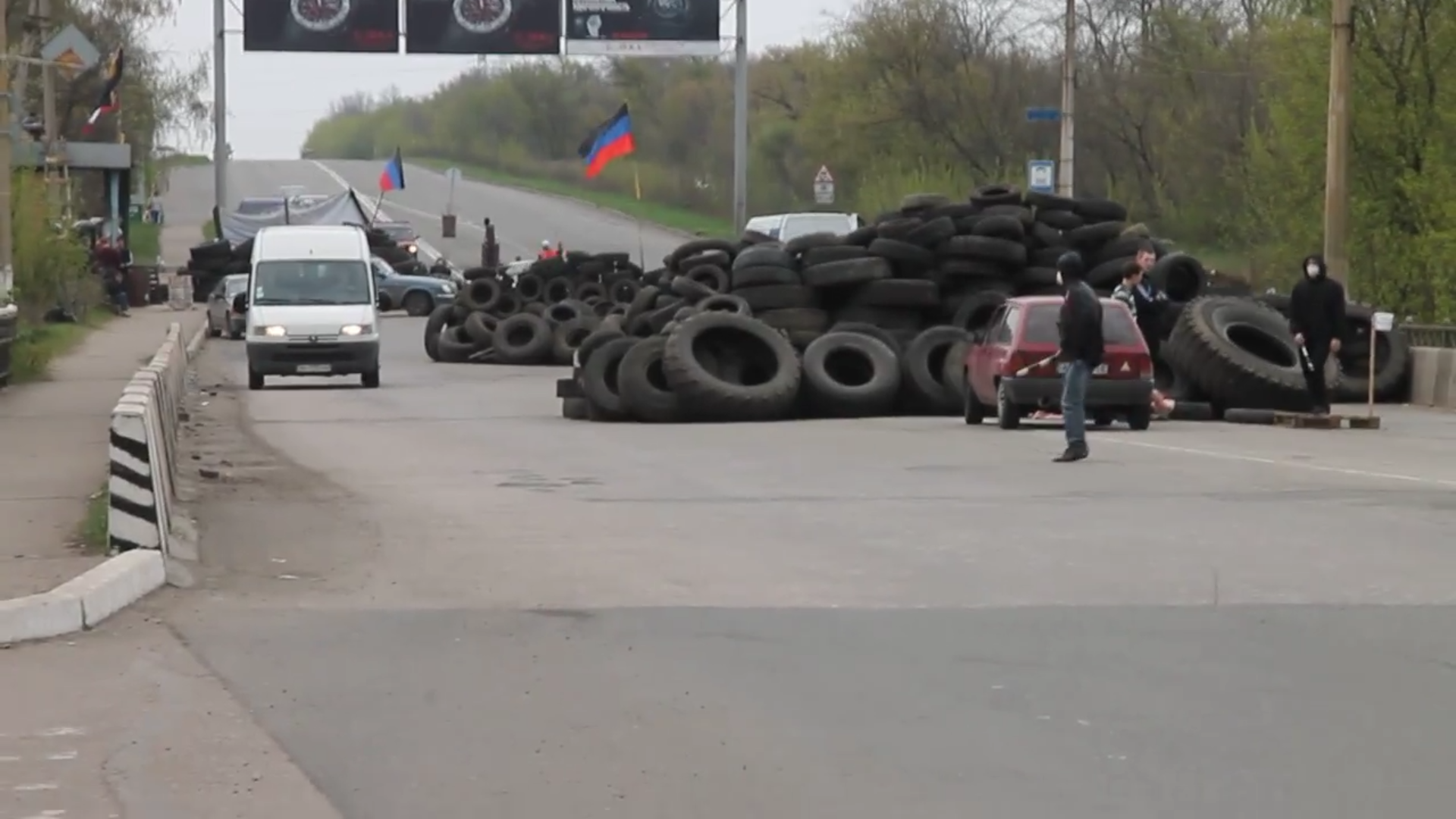
DPR checkpoint in Kramatorsk on 19 April 2014

The standoff began on 12 April, when a group of separatists from the Donbass People's Militia attempted to capture a police station. A shootout with police followed, eventually leading to the capture of the building by the separatists. After capturing the building, they tore the Ukrainian coat of arms off the building, and raised the flag of the Donetsk People's Republic. The insurgents then issued an ultimatum stating that if the city's mayor and his subordinates did not swear allegiance to the People's Republic by Monday, they would "takeover the city council". A crowd of separatists later rallied around the city council building, entered it, and raised the flag of the People's Republic over it. A representative of the Donetsk People's Republic addressed locals outside the captured police station, but was received negatively by the crowd. On the outskirts of the city, some insurgents set up a checkpoint near a local military airfield.

=== First government counter-offensive ===
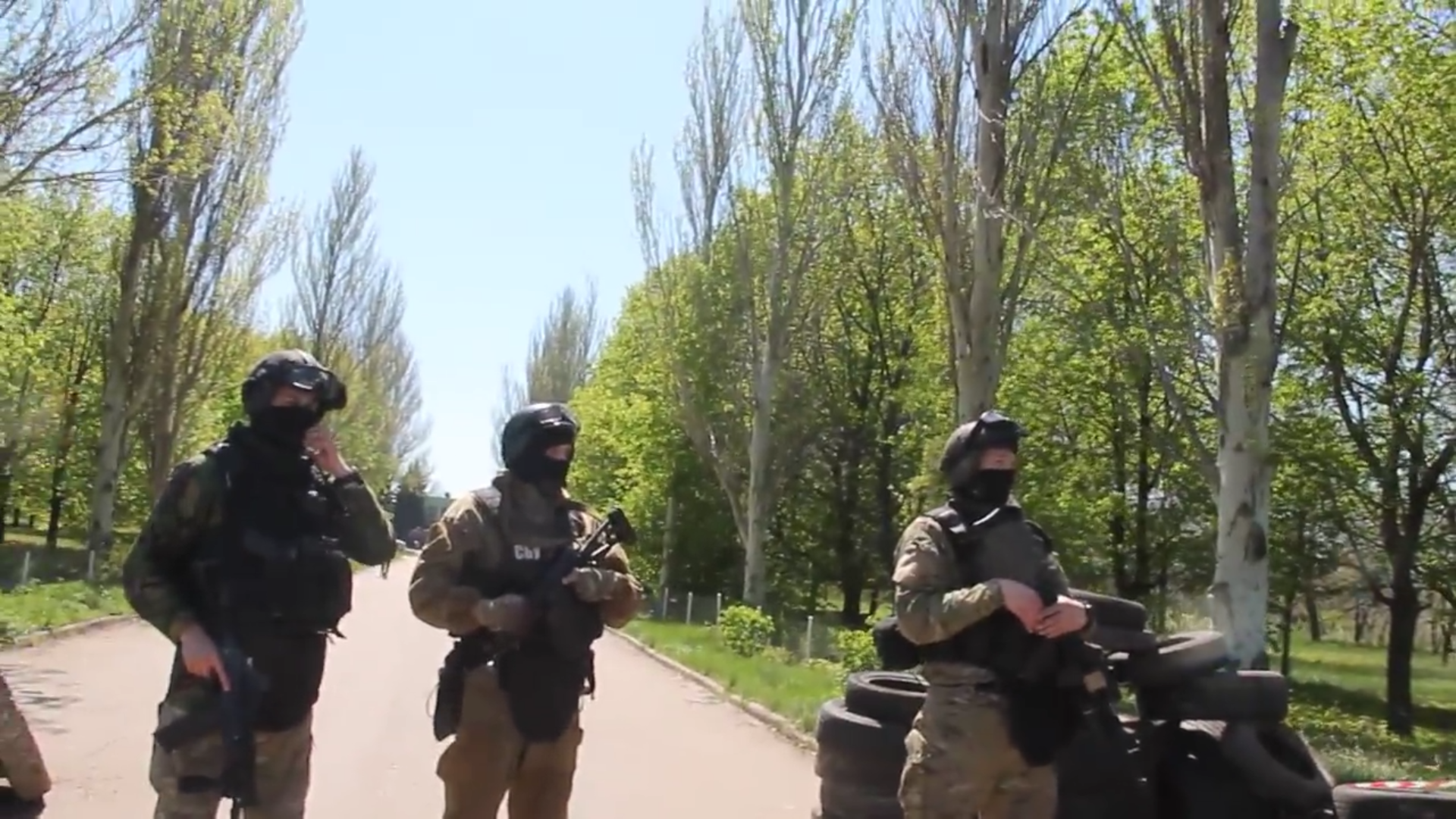
Alpha Group agents of the Security Service of Ukraine blocking off an area in Kramatorsk on 25 April 2014

By 15 April, however, the Ukrainian transitional government had launched a counter-offensive against insurgents in Donetsk Oblast. The Ukrainian Ground Forces attacked the insurgent checkpoint at the airfield and then regained control over the airfield itself. It was estimated that between four and eleven insurgents were killed in the attack. Insurgents made another attempt to capture the airfield on 16 April, but Ukrainian special forces that had been guarding the airfield since its original recapturing quickly drove them away, and took several prisoners. The Ukrainian troops reportedly saw hundreds of civilians and armed men gathered outside the military cordon around the airfield. Amidst the Ukrainian counter-offensive on 16 April, six Ukrainian armoured vehicles that had been travelling through Kramatorsk were captured by the insurgents. These captured vehicles were then sent to reinforce Donbass People's Militia positions in Sloviansk, which were under heavy siege by government forces. The insurgents later offered to exchange hostages, including the local police chief, for weapons.

On 17 April forces of the 25th Airborne Brigade advanced towards Kramatorsk airfield. Despite the actions of local civilians, who attempted to block the unit's movement, its soldiers managed to reach the location and establish control over the object.

=== Second government counter-offensive ===
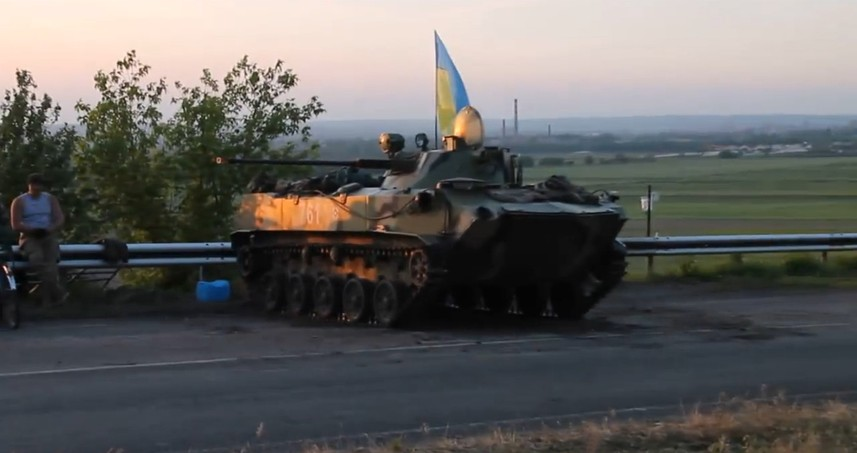
Ukrainian paratrooper roadblock with a BMD-2 between Kramatorsk and Sloviansk on 11 May 2014

Government forces focused primarily on Sloviansk for the next few days. However, on 25 April, a military helicopter at the Kramatorsk airfield exploded after its fuel tank was shot while it was taking off. Insurgents claimed responsibility for the shooting, and said that they had hit the helicopter with a rocket propelled grenade in an interview with Russian media. Dmitry Tymchuk, a defence expert and director of the Centre of Military and Political Research in Kyiv, told reporters that the Mi-8 helicopter pilot had managed to escape with minor injuries. A transport aeroplane was also reportedly destroyed.

After having recaptured many formerly occupied buildings in Sloviansk during a renewed offensive there, Ukrainian forces successfully captured a television transmission tower in Kramatorsk on 2 May. Further clashes between the Ukrainian army and insurgent fighters overnight on 2–3 May led to the death of ten pro-Russian activists, and left thirty injured, according to a local pro-Russian self-defence leader. During the fighting, the Ukrainian army was able to remove the insurgents from the Security Service of Ukraine (SBU) building that they had been occupying. Street battles broke out, and Russian media reported that the city was mostly under the control of Ukrainian forces, with only the city square remaining under pro-Russian control. However, it was reported the next day that the building had been abandoned by government forces, rather than fortified, and that the flag of the Donetsk People's Republic still flew from it even after the insurgents had been evicted.

This eviction did not last long, as the Ukrainian army abruptly withdrew back to their positions at the military airfield on 4 May. Insurgents then reclaimed the SBU building and police station that had been abandoned by Ukrainian forces. During the day, clashes erupted between insurgents and an army column on a road near Kramatorsk, which left one civilian dead.

A Ukrainian army unit was ambushed near Kramatorsk by about thirty DPR soldiers on 13 May. The ambush was initiated when DPR forces fired a rocket-propelled grenade at an armoured personnel carrier that had been carrying paratroopers, causing the vehicle to explode. Many soldiers were injured in the ensuing skirmish, and seven soldiers were killed, along with one separatist. A government mortar carrier was also destroyed in the fighting.

As part of the continuing military operation around Kramatorsk, the army destroyed a separatist hide-out in a forest near the city, and captured three DPR soldiers, on 15 May.

=== Continued fighting ===
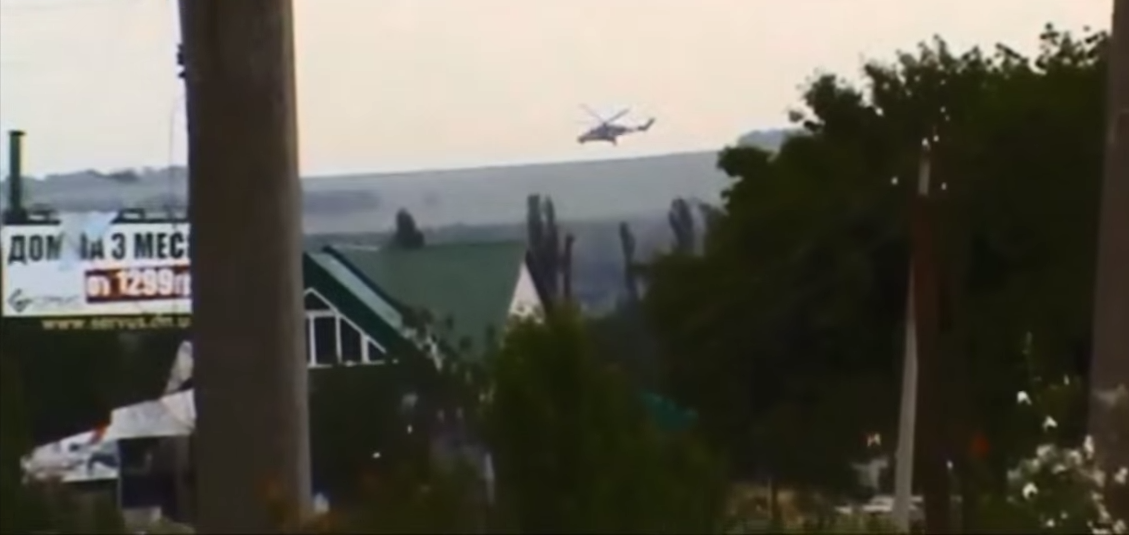
Two UAF Mil Mi-24 attack helicopters in the DPR-controlled suburb of Semenivka on 3 June 2014 during an offensive

Fighting continued on 2 June, on the outskirts of Kramatorsk, leaving three people dead. A more significant incident took place on 14 June, when the Ukrainian government launched an airstrike on insurgent positions in Kramatorsk. They said that they killed at least fifty insurgents.

Pro-Russian militants attacked an army checkpoint near Kramatorsk on 27 June, and captured it. However, soon after government forces conducted a counter-attack and managed to recapture the checkpoint. The fighting left four soldiers dead and five wounded. During their assault, the insurgents used eight tanks, and mortars. Four government armoured personnel carriers and one mortar were destroyed in the fighting. Dmitry Tmchuk reported that one of the separatists' tanks was destroyed, and one captured, while the number of militant casualties was unknown and there was no verification from the separatists.

A city bus was hit by gunfire on 1 July, leaving four civilians dead and five wounded. Government forces captured the stronghold of Sloviansk from the insurgents on 5 July, forcing them to retreat to Kramatorsk. BBC News reported that witnesses saw insurgents abandoning checkpoints in Kramatorsk. Later on the same day, DPR prime minister Alexander Borodai confirmed that the insurgents had withdrawn from Kramatorsk, and retreated to Donetsk city. Ukrainian forces then regained control of the town, and raised the Ukrainian flag over the city administration building. Kramatorsk city administration said that at least fifty people had been killed in the fighting, and that twenty-two remained in the hospital as of 8 July because of injuries incurred during it.

== Aftermath ==
Following the withdrawal of Donetsk People's Republic (DPR) forces on 5 July 2014, Ukrainian government troops, together with the Security Service of Ukraine, conducted a security sweep of nearby settlements. On 7 July 2014, they took control of the small village of Semenivka.

The recapture of Kramatorsk proved strategically significant for the Ukrainian government. As the city was under its control, Ukrainian authorities relocated the regional administration to Kramatorsk. In October 2014, Kramatorsk became the provisional administrative centre of Donetsk Oblast. This move was prompted by the fact that parts of Donetsk Oblast, including the city of Donetsk itself, remained under DPR control.

As a result of this administrative shift, Kramatorsk came to serve as a hub for both civilian and military functions. The Ukrainian Anti-Terrorist Operation (ATO) command was headquartered nearby, and significant government institutions relocated to the city. Due to the ongoing conflict and the loss of control over the city of Donetsk, Kramatorsk remained the de facto seat of the Donetsk Oblast government for the parts of the region under Ukrainian control.

== See also ==
- Outline of the Russo-Ukrainian War
