= Kramatorsk =

City in Donetsk Oblast, Ukraine

Kramatorsk Краматорськ
- City
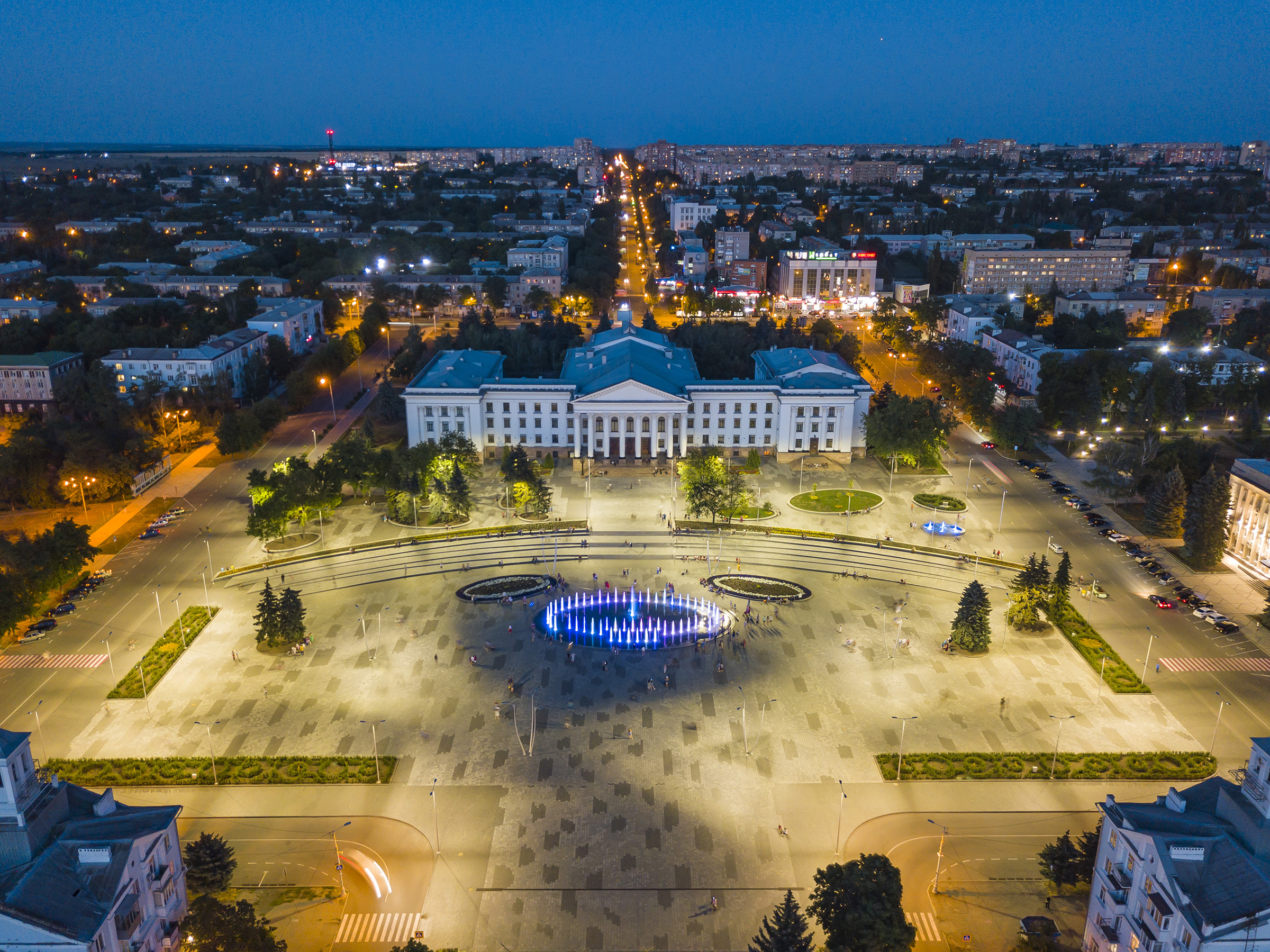
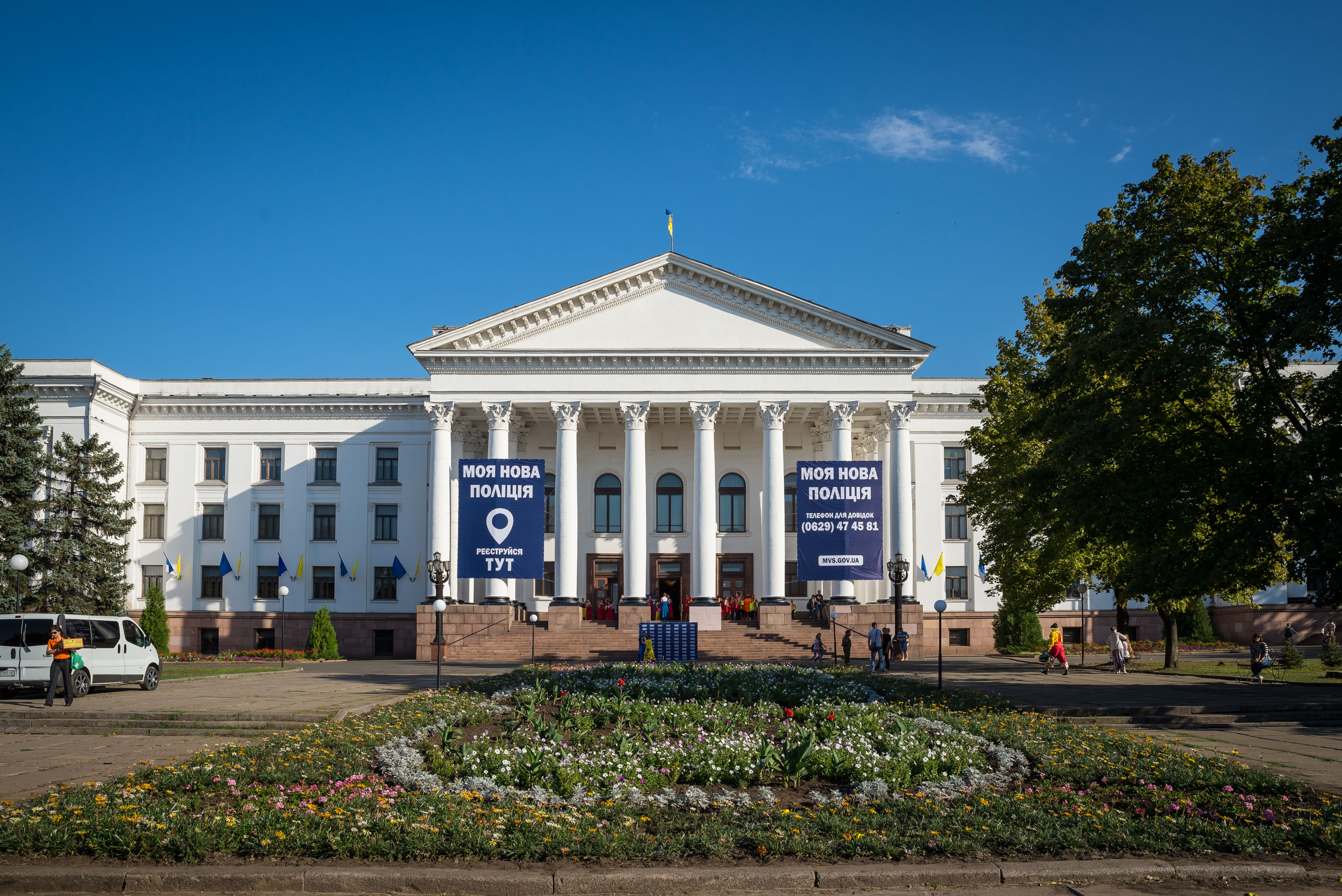
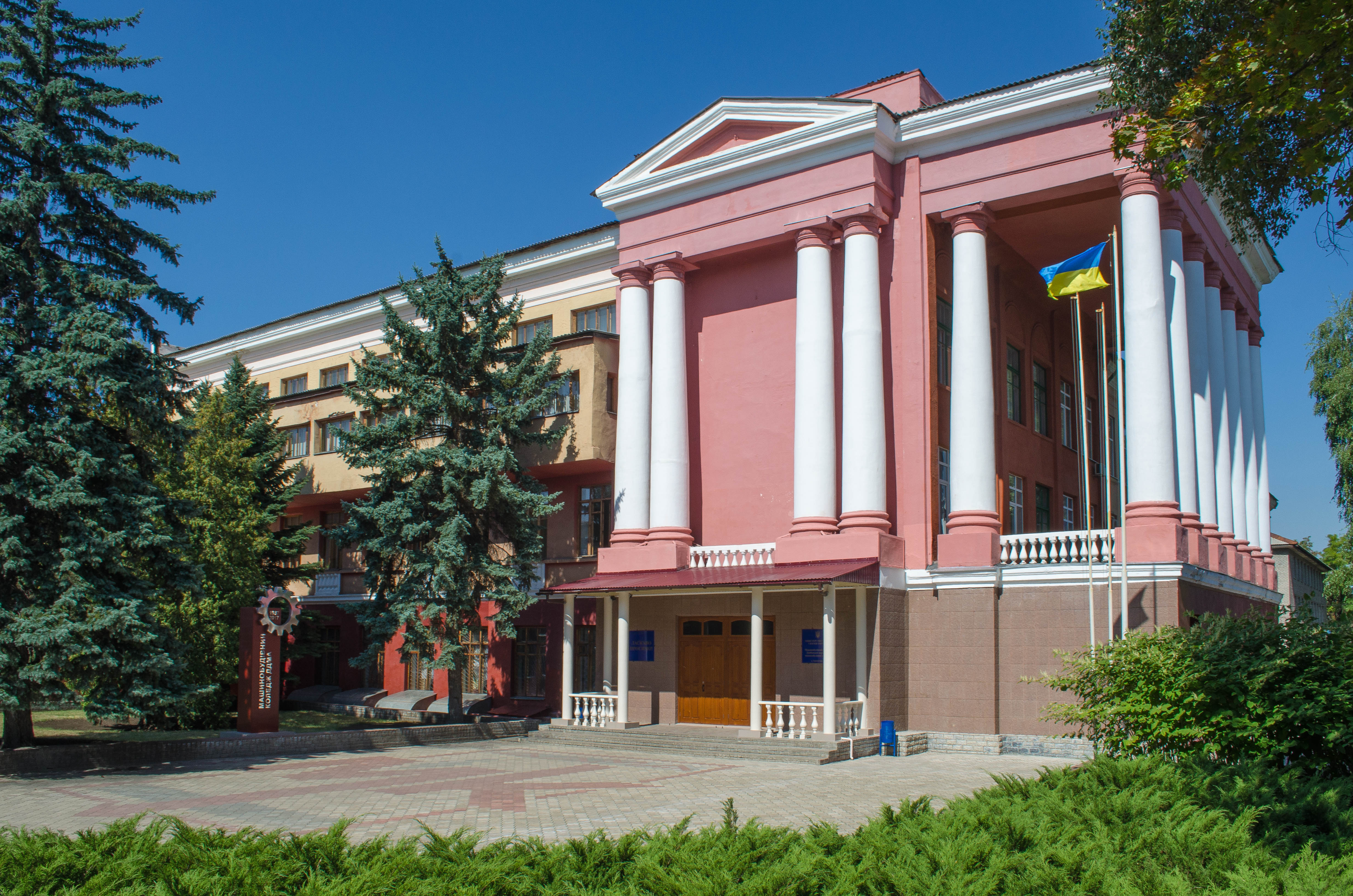
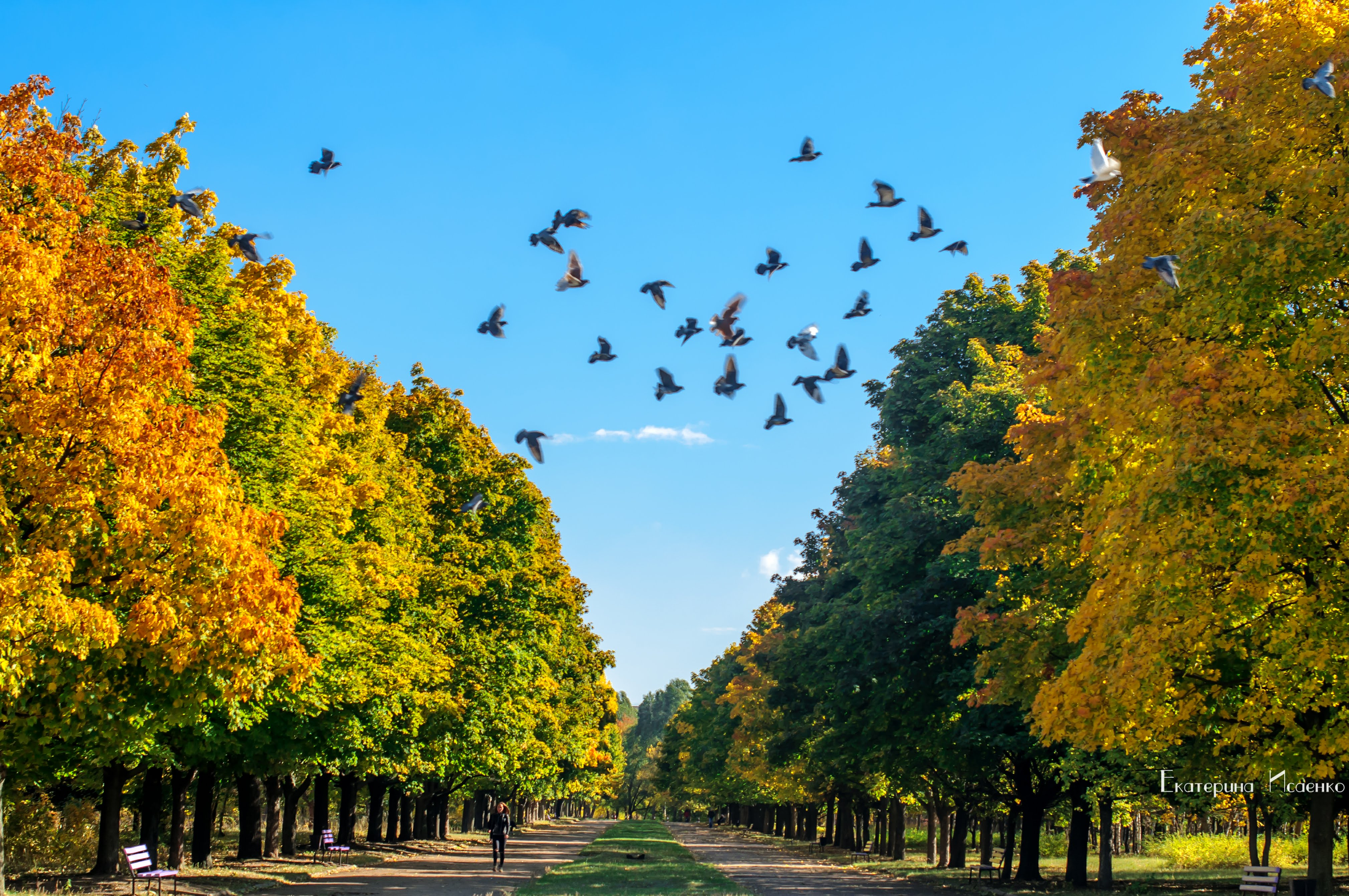
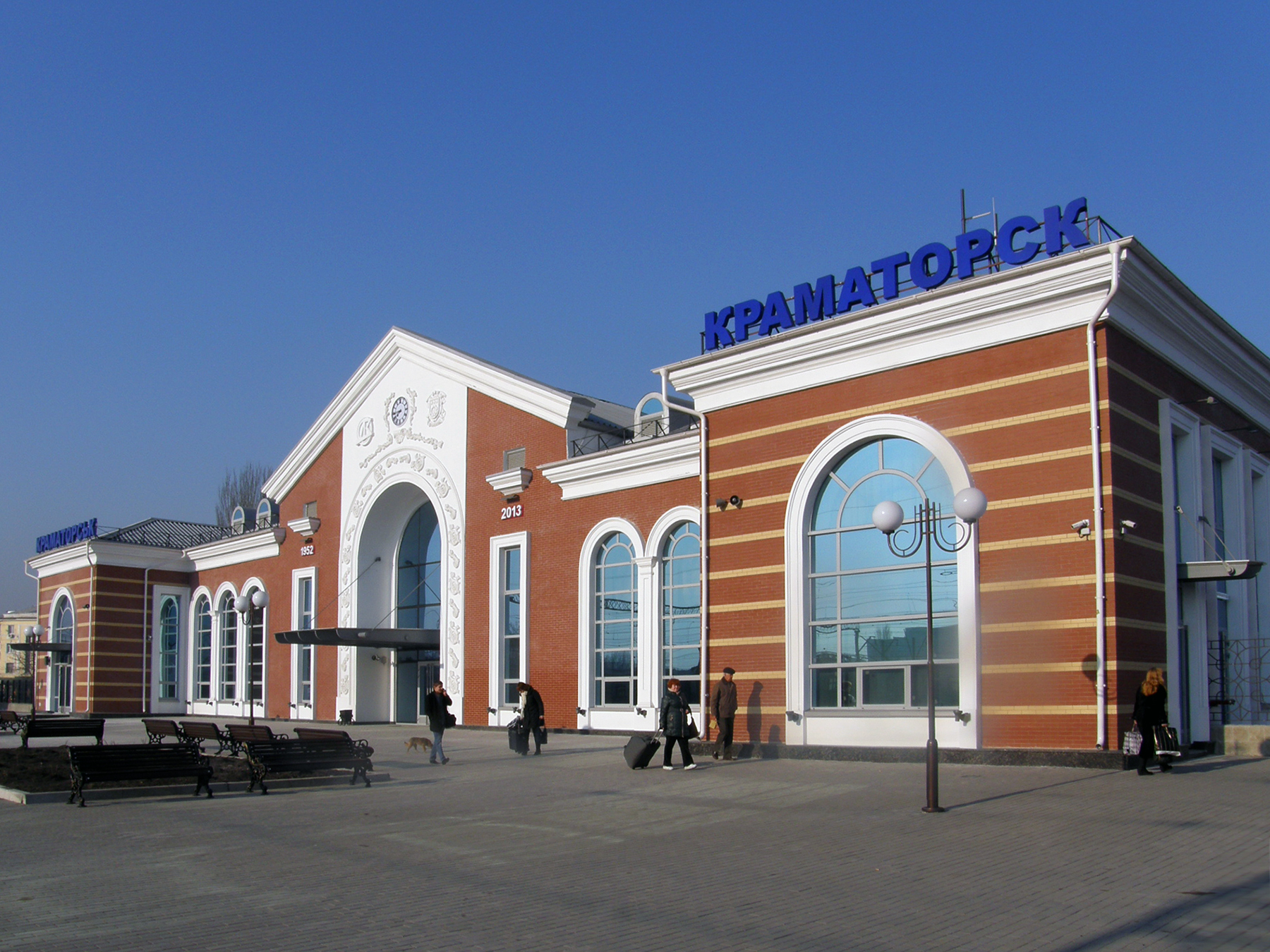
- Main square Palace of Culture Vocational College Yuvileinyi Park Railway station

- Flag Coat of arms
- Interactive map of Kramatorsk
- Kramatorsk on the map of Donetsk Oblast Kramatorsk (Ukraine)
- Coordinates: 48°44′21″N 37°35′02″E
- Country: Ukraine
- Oblast: Donetsk Oblast
- Raion: Kramatorsk Raion
- Hromada: Kramatorsk urban hromada
- Founded: 1868
- City status since: 1932

Government
  - Body: Kramatorsk city Rada
  - Head: Oleksandr Honcharenko

Area
  - Total: 117.1 km^{2} (45.2 sq mi)

Population (2022)
  - Total: 147,145
  - Density: 1,257/km^{2} (3,255/sq mi)
- Time zone: UTC+2 (EET)
  - Summer (DST): UTC+3 (EEST)
- Postal code: 84300-84390
- Area code: +380 626(4)
- Website: krm.gov.ua

Kramatorsk (Ukrainian: Краматорськ, pronounced [krɐmɐˈtɔrʲsʲk]; Russian: Краматорск) is a city and the administrative centre of Kramatorsk Raion in Donetsk Oblast of the Donbas region of eastern Ukraine. Prior to 2020, Kramatorsk was a city of oblast significance. Since October 2014, Kramatorsk has been the provisional seat of Donetsk Oblast, following the events surrounding the war in Donbas. Its population is 147,145 (2022 estimate). It is an important industrial and mechanical engineering center in Ukraine. Kramatorsk is on the banks of the Kazennyi Torets, a right tributary of the Siverskyi Donets.

During the Russo-Ukrainian war, Kramatorsk has been hit by Russian shelling multiple times, with singular Russian mass murder events against Ukrainian civilians having taken place in 2015, 2022, 2023 and 2026.

== Etymology ==
According to Doctor of Philology Yevhen Otin from Dnipro who specializes in onomastics, the name of the city comes from a toponymic phrase that has not been preserved: Krom Torov or Krom Torskaya 'border along the Tor River'. The word kroma means 'edge, frontier, border', and Tor is the old name for the Kazennyi Torets River. However, it can be stated succinctly, it's most likely from the train station, the settlement was built around. The original name of the train station, Kram-na-Tore translates as Border-on-Tor (lit. 'on the bank of the Tor river'). Similar to the Russian city Rostov-on-Don, which is located at the mouth of the Don River.

During the Soviet period, it was thought that the name comes from a French word "crématoire" connecting it with a local factory. Such version was proposed by a Russian linguist Vladimir Nikonov from Simbirsk (Ulyanovsk). However, Dr. Otin pointed out that settlement of Kramatoroka existed before establishment of any factories.

== History ==
=== Early history ===
Scarce historical documents do not provide information of previous settlement in the area, but archaeological excavations in the area show that it was populated. In the second half of the 17th and early 18th centuries, the area in which Kramatorsk was to develop was heavily populated by Cossacks from the Hetmanate, particularly Oril Palatinate of Zaporizhian Sich which was liquidated in 1775. Here were finding a refuge from their landowners serfs from the southern regions of Muscovy and Mordovia. In 1767 the Tsarist government granted 10,000 dessiatin to a Russian count Taranov who established a village of serfs Petrovka. In 1799 it was added to Izyum uyezd (county) of Sloboda Ukraine Governorate.

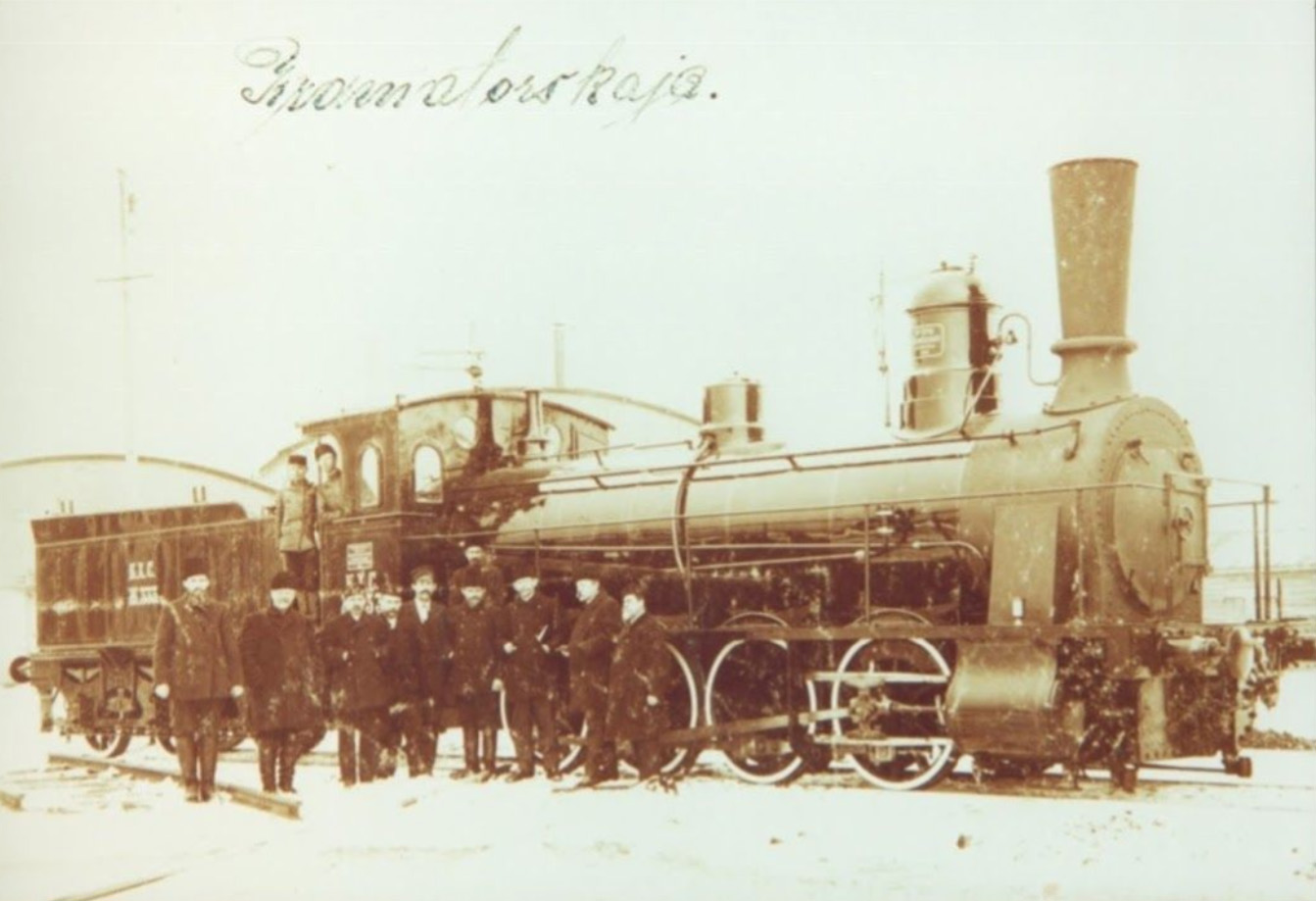
Locomotive at the Kramatorsk railway station (Kramatorskaja (Note: a feminine possessive form of Kramatorsk)) of the Kursk-Kharkiv-Azov Railway

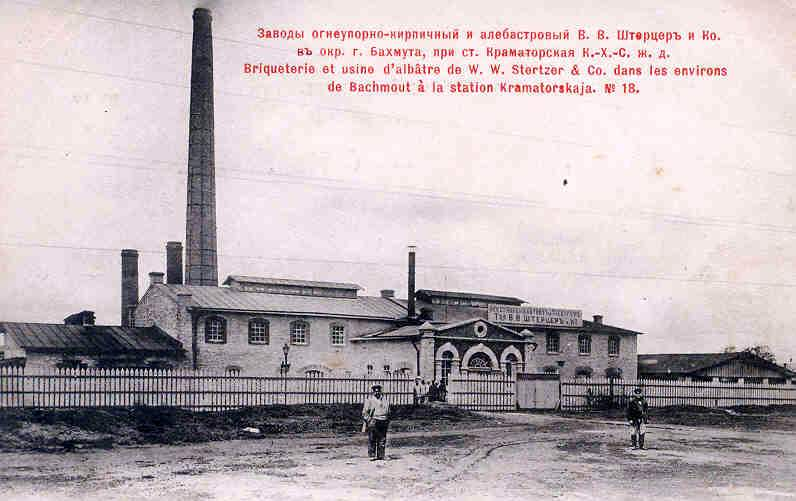
A brick-refractory factory of Stertzer and Co. at Kramatorsk rail station near Bakhmut

Kramatorsk came into being in the second half of the 19th century when a station on the Kursk-Kharkiv-Azov Railway was built. The station was originally called Kram-na-Tore in 1868 but this was later contracted into Kramatorsk and the town of Kramatorsk developed around the railway station, becoming a major urban settlement in the north of Donetsk Oblast with several heavy machine production facilities. In 1885 in area were found deposits of chaulk, sand, sandstone, valuable clays, mineral dyes which provided construction of building materials. In 1887 Belgian investors (Stertzer and Sons) built a factory of refractory materials near Kramatorsk rail station. In 1896 the German firm "W.Fizner and K.Hamper" opened a machine factory manufacturing its products for local mining and rail industries. The factory was also producing its own metal. Just before the 1905 Russian Revolution, during the 1901–1904 production of cast iron at the factory tripled and accounted for 4.5 millions of poods. Number of employed workers at the factory has doubled during that period (1900–1904) to some 1,460. The workers of the factory were peasants hired from nearby villages, while managing personnel was predominantly foreigners. During the Soviet period that factory was known as the Old Kramatorsk Machine-Building Plant. A factory worker for one 11–12 hour work day was receiving around 70 kopecks to 1 ruble and 10 kopecks. A primary medical institution for the factory was a regional hospital in Sloviansk (about 15 km (9.3 mi)), while in Kramatorsk was a small local clinic with no more than 12 beds. At that time around the settlement appeared smaller iron shops that belonged to Vykov merchants. Employed at least 70 craftsmen, they were producing plowshares, horseshoes, shovels. The settlement accounted for two steam-powered mills, blacksmith shops, grain crusher mill.

The first educational institution was opened in 1869 by the Kramatorsk rail station administration as a single grade school for children of the rail station servicemen, clerks of telegraph and post office, local police. About 20 years later a gubernatorial government established a primary 2-year parochial school which had a small library (part of the Ministry of National Education program). In 1897 the "W.Fizner and K.Hamper" company established the 3-year factory school for children of the administration and skilled workers.

=== 20th century ===
Already in spring of 1903, the Old Kramatorsk Machine-Building Plant came under influence of the Russian Social Democratic Labour Party (RSDLP) of Kharkiv and Ekaterinoslav (Dnipro) party cells and at the factory was organized first "revolutionary" group. The group had intention to join the political strike that took place in summer of 1903 at the Russian South (including today's Ukraine), but in August members of the group were all arrested. In spring of 1904 RSDLP established its party cell within the town of Kramatorsk itself. In mid February 1905 the RSDLP organized a short strike that ended after arrival of couple of companies of the Lebedyn regiment. Some 600 workers were fired right away. In the beginning of 1905 Kramatorsk accounted for over 12,000 residents.

Later that year RSDLP organized scandal at the factory turning prayer for the October Manifesto into an unsanctioned gathering which called for armed uprising. During that time, at the factory was organized a local council of workers' deputies, a soviet (before Bolshevization of the Soviets). Under influence of Bolsheviks, in 1905 a renegade Bolshevik Military Organizations was established in Kramatorsk which organized the purchase of arms. There also was established a communication with the Kharkiv Locomotive Factory council of workers' deputies. On 12 December 1905 there was a huge strike at the factory calling for overthrowing the Russian Tsar (Nicholas II of Russia) and talked about the need to provide the peasants with land. In 1906 Kramatorsk was visited by members of the Central Committee of the Russian Social Democratic Labour Party, while financially they were supported by the Ekaterinoslav party headed by Grigory Petrovsky. On 11 June 1906 Kramatorsk joined the Bolshevik mutiny which included factories of Yuzivka, Kostiantynivka, Druzhkivka, Horlivka factories and accounted for some 3,000 workers calling for armed uprising and support of peasants for their rights on land. The demonstrators marched to the neighboring village of Petrovka. The Russian Minister of Internal Affairs Pyotr Stolypin was calling the Kiev Military District commander to immediately dispatch a military detachment to Izyum uyezd (county) and Kramatorsk, in particular. The Kramatorsk factory was forced to be closed and workers were released, while those who participated in the mutiny were prosecuted. Later the factory was reopened.

The town of Kramatorsk gave a jump start to a political career of Ukrainian Bolshevik Vlas Chubar who organized at the factory a school of political propaganda. Following the Lena massacre, on 1 May 1912 Chubar organized protest with red banners which gathered some 2,000 workers. Many participants were fired, while some were sent to military service. Vlas Chubar was imprisoned in the Bakhmut jail (Bakhmut). During that time Bolsheviks were carrying out a fundraising at the factory for their "Pravda" newspaper (est. 5 May 1912). A very close relations local Bolsheviks kept with a member of the Russian State Duma from Kharkov Governorate and a local Bolshevik from the Poltava's suburbs Matvei Muranov who visited Kramatorsk in 1913.

Before World War I, the town remained an unorganized workers' settlement. It accounted for some 4,000 residents (1914).

In April 1918 troops loyal to the Ukrainian People's Republic took control of Kramatorsk.

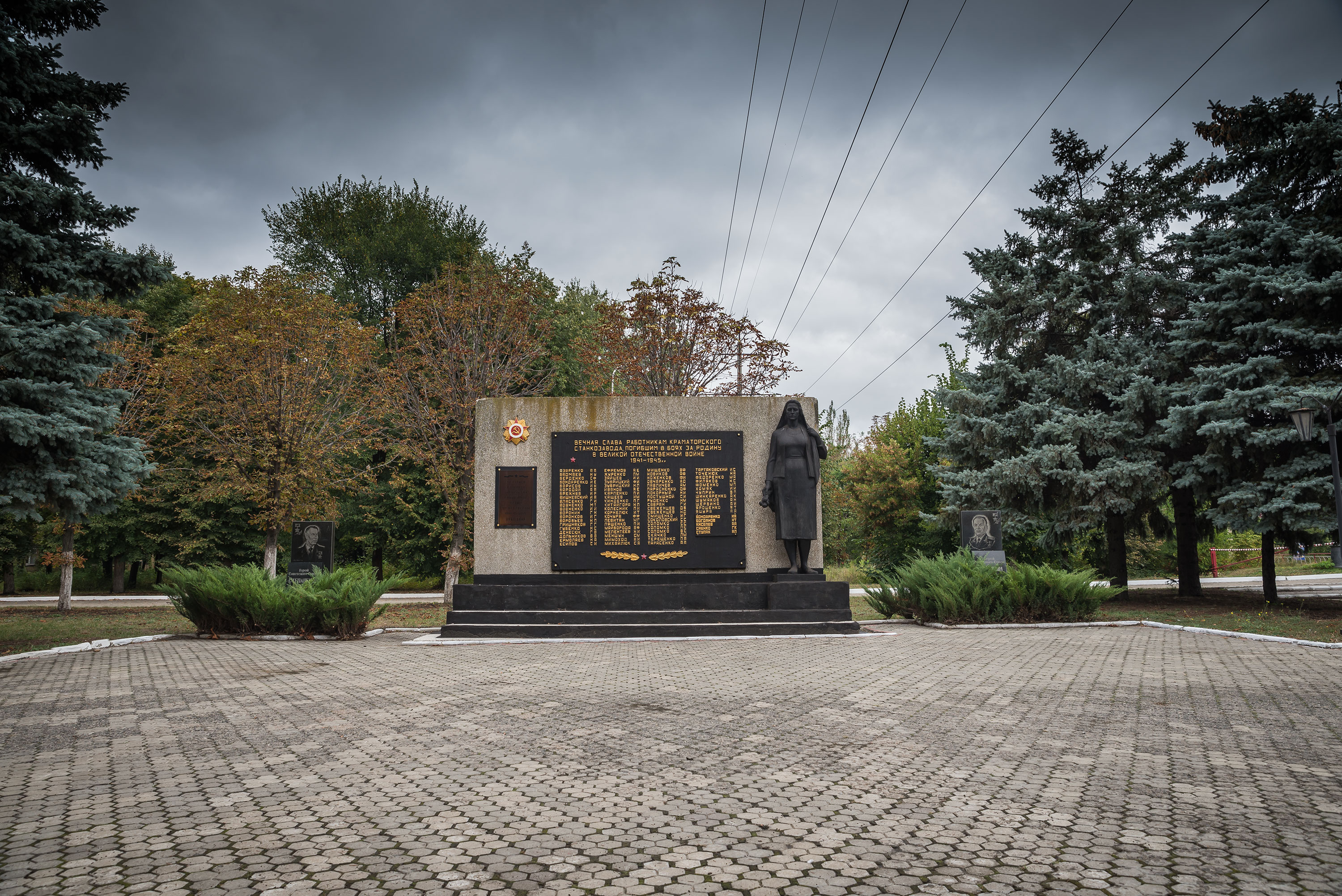
Mass grave of local victims of World War II

During World War II, it was occupied by Nazi Germany between 20 October 1941 and 6 February 1942 and again between 27 February 1942 and 6 September 1943.

Between 1980 and 1989, several people were exposed to a radiological source in one of the apartment buildings, resulting in 6 deaths and at least 17 cases of radiation sickness.

=== Russo-Ukrainian War ===
On 12 April 2014, at the same time as events in nearby Sloviansk, the police station in Kramatorsk was seized by armed pro-Russian militants in military uniform, and later the city council was too. Kramatorsk remained under pro-Russian separatist control, until July 2014. There would be a series of incidents in those three months. Located only 13 km from Sloviansk, which became a separatist stronghold, Kramatorsk would also be under separatist control, yet in a different situation. Unlike Sloviansk, which had high profile figures Vyacheslav Ponomarev and Igor Girkin/Strelkov associated with it, Kramatorsk was not notable in this sphere. Further, while the Ukrainian army did not enter Sloviansk in its months under separatist control, they made several entries into Kramatorsk in this time. On 5 July, after almost three months, Ukrainian forces finally retook control of Kramatorsk, as part of sweeping territorial gains at that time, including nearby Sloviansk. In October 2014, Kramatorsk was made the provisional administrative center of Donetsk Oblast after the administration relocated from Mariupol. On 10 February 2015, Kramatorsk was shelled by pro-Russian forces, leaving 17 people dead and 60 injured.

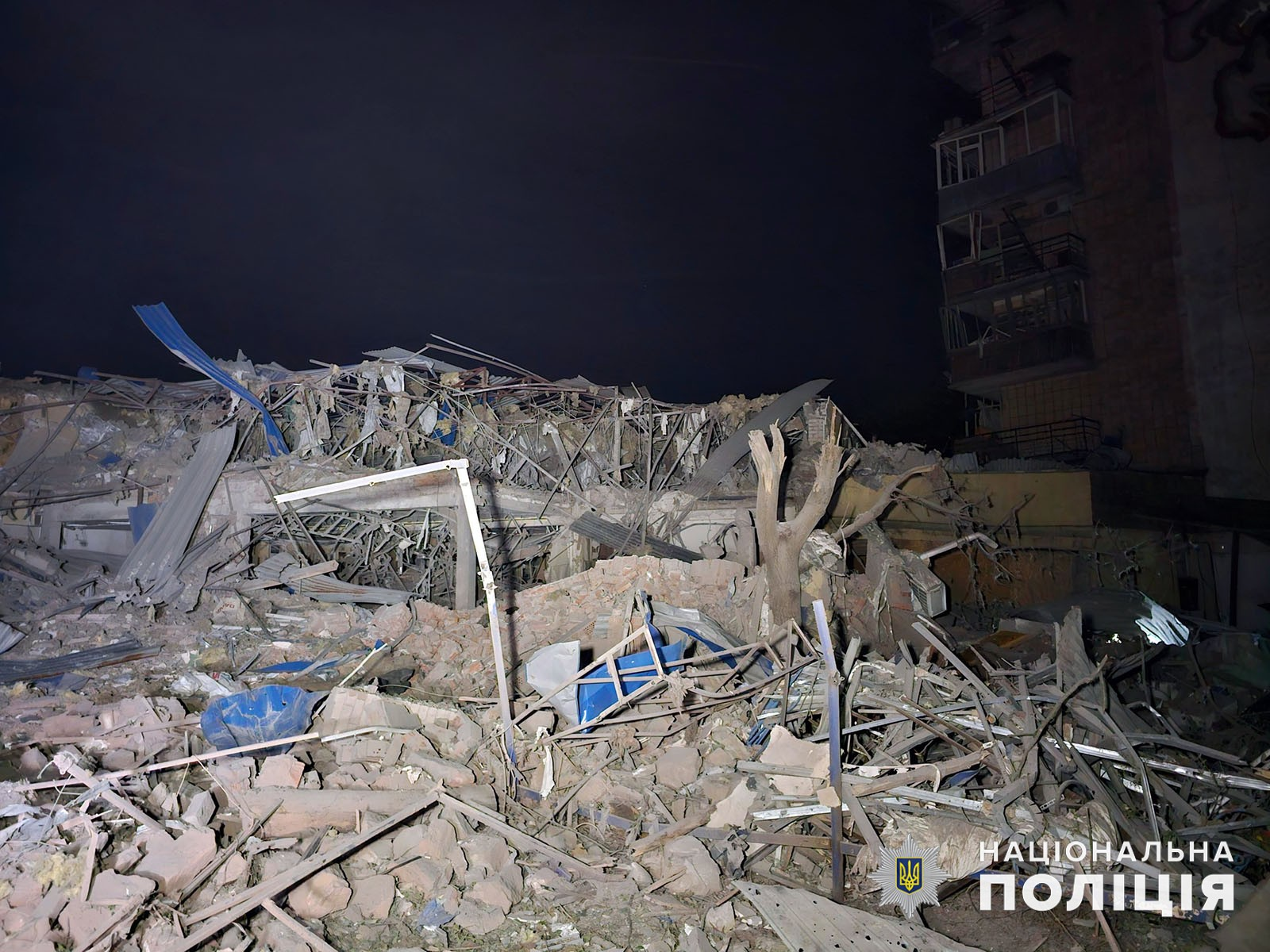
Destructions after a Russian missile strike on 25 August 2024

On 8 April 2022, during the Russian invasion of Ukraine, Kramatorsk was subjected to missile strikes. The Kramatorsk railway station was hit by Tochka-U missiles which killed at least 57 people and wounded at least 109 others. Pavlo Kyrylenko, the governor of the Donetsk Oblast, said thousands of people had been at the station at the time the two missiles struck. On 19 April 2022, Russian troops launched rocket attacks on Kramatorsk, as a result of which one person was killed and three were injured. On 21 April 2022, British Defence Ministry intelligence reported that Russian troops in the Donetsk Oblast were advancing towards Kramatorsk. However, in early September 2022, Ukraine launched a major counteroffensive, regaining several settlements in the Kharkiv Oblast. This relieved the pressure on Kramatorsk with the recapture of Lyman by Ukrainian forces on 1 October 2022.

On 27 June 2023, a Russian missile strike killed at least 11 people and injured over 60 in a pizza restaurant in the center of the city.

As part of broader offensive efforts in Donetsk Oblast, Russian forces advanced in direction of Kramatorsk, making it a frontline city. On 10 September 2025, Ukrainian authorities ordered the evacuation of children and their guardians from some areas in and around the city, citing increased drone activity.

On 8 october 2026, a Russian strike on two busses killed 33 people and injured 18 more.

== Geography ==
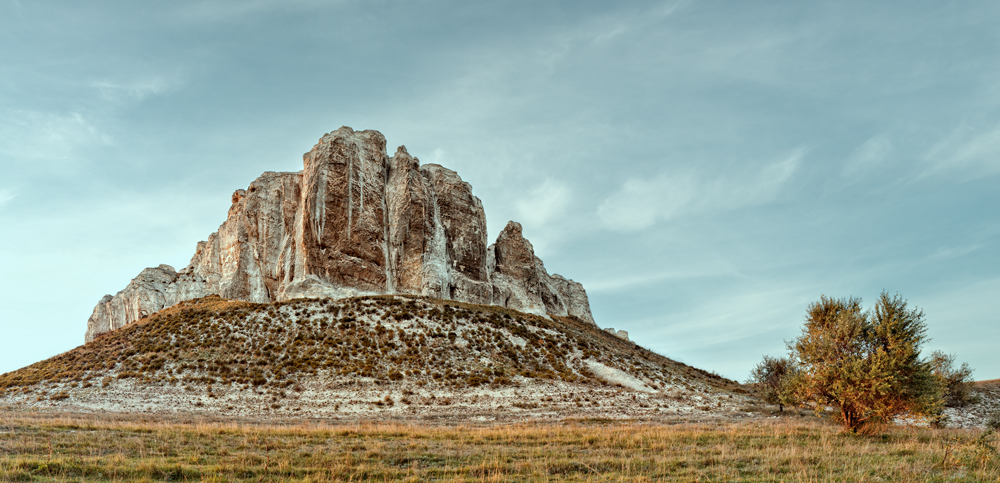
Chalk mountains near Kramatorsk

The Kramatorsk metro area is located in Kramatorsk Raion, making it a central part of a major urban agglomeration with over 500,000 inhabitants.

== Demographics ==
Kramatorsk has a population of over 164,700 inhabitants (2013) and has a metropolitan area of over 197,000 inhabitants (2013). Ukrainians are by far the largest ethnic group, yet the city is mostly Russophone. The exact ethnic and linguistic composition as of the Ukrainian Census of 2001 was:

=== Ethnicity ===
- Ukrainians: 70.2%
- Russians: 26.9%
- Belarusians: 0.7%
- Armenians: 0.6%
- Azerbaijanis: 0.2%
- Jews: 0.1%

=== Language ===
- Russian: 67.9%
- Ukrainian: 31.1%
- Armenian: 0.2%
- Belarusian: 0.1%
- Romani: 0.1%

According to the regional department of statistics, as of 1 January 2017, the population of Kramatorsk was 190,648 people.

== Economy and industry ==
=== Industrial and mining equipment ===
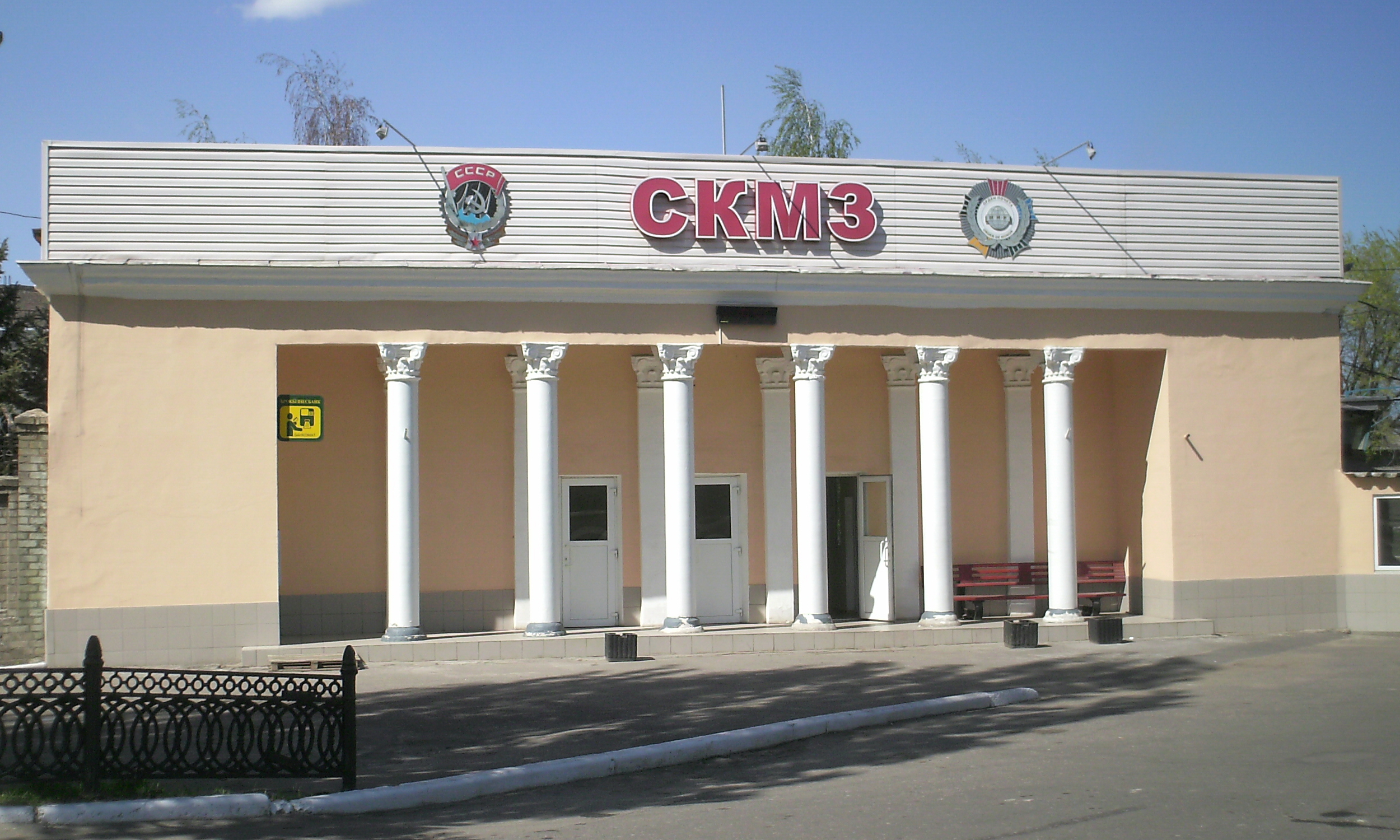
Old Kramatorsk machine plant

- New Kramatorsk Machinebuilding Plant (NKMZ) (founded 1934): design and production of machines and equipment for mining, steel rolling, metallurgy, production and handling of cast iron, artillery weapon systems.
- Old Kramatorsk Machinebuilding Plant (founded 1896)

In the 2000s, a wind turbine production facility was constructed in Kramatorsk. This is a joint venture between German Fuhrländer AG and its Ukrainian partners. According to their site, Fuhrländer became the first company in the renewable energy sector to obtain a building permit from the Ukrainian government.

==== Transportation ====
Between 1937 and 1 August 2017, Kramatorsk had a tram network. However, it is now closed and public transportation is provided by buses and trolley-buses.

== Healthcare ==
The city has 18 medical and preventive care facilities, employing 634 doctors and 1,750 nursing staff. The hospital bed ratio is 85.7 per 10,000 residents, with a total of 1,730 beds. The occupancy rate per bed is 338.5 days (2007).

The main causes of mortality are circulatory diseases (75.8% of the total number of deaths in the city), neoplasms (17.4%), and gastrointestinal diseases (2.9%). Neoplasms are the leading cause of death among the working-age population.

The infant mortality rate per 1,000 live births was: 11.6 in 2005; 12.7 in 2006; 2007—10.7. (The regional average is over 13.9).

From 1996 to November 2008, 836 HIV-positive individuals were identified in the city, 88 of whom were children. 179 infected individuals were diagnosed with AIDS. During this time, 229 HIV-infected individuals died in the city, 136 of whom were due to AIDS. 91.6% of those infected were aged 18 to 49. Over the past year, the number of blood-borne infections has decreased (from 49% to 45%), while sexually transmitted infections have increased (from 41% to 45%).

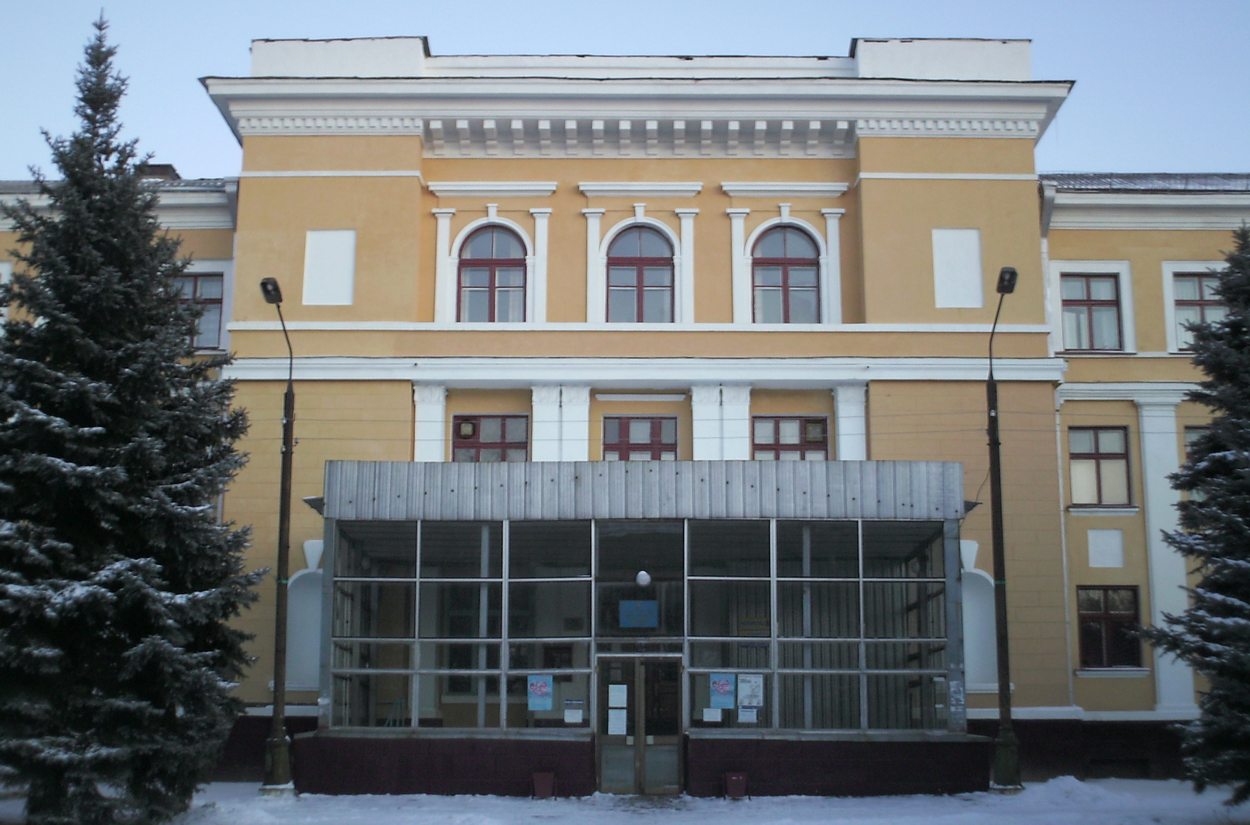
Polyclinic #3

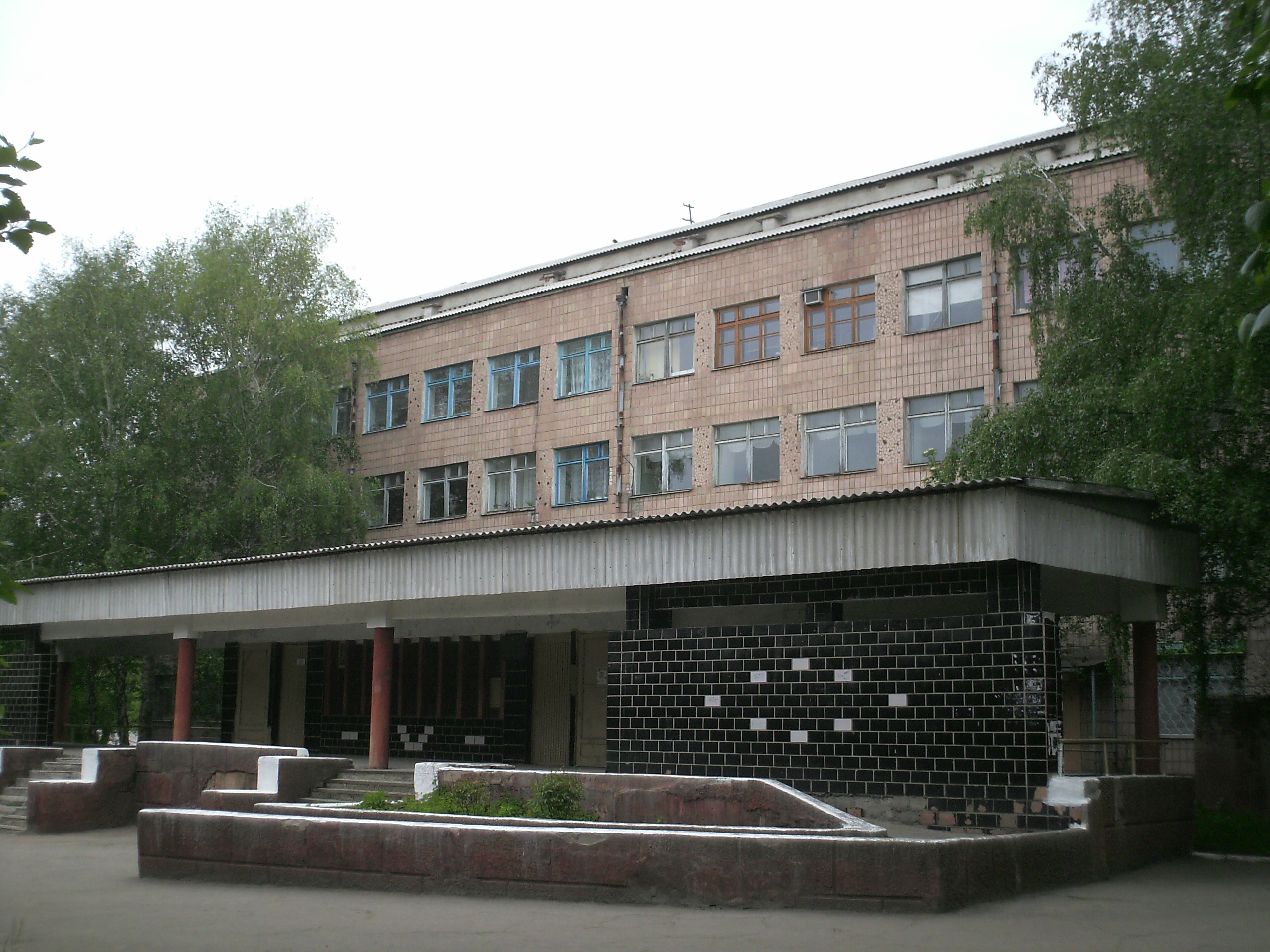
Children's Polyclinic #3

== Culture ==
Kramatorsk has 3 art schools, 1 art school, and a centralized public library system (the M. Gorky Central City Public Library, Children's Central Library named after A. Pushkin and 13 branch libraries), as well as 16 clubs and cultural centers:

- NKMZ Palace of Culture and Technology,
- City (since 2000) Palace of Culture,
- City (since 1998) Palace of Culture "Stroitel",
- Club "Cementnik",
- Donetsk Regional Chess Club named after A.V. Momot,
- Kramatorsk Chess Club,
- Center for Extracurricular Activities (House of Pioneers),
- Museums:
  - Kramatorsk History Museum;
  - Kramatorsk Art Museum;
  - Museums of enterprises:
    - NKMZ
    - SKMZ
    - KCZ "Pushka"
    - Museum of the History of the Dagestan State Medical Academy
- Leonid Bykov Aeroclub,
- Kramatorsk City Photo Club "YURIS".
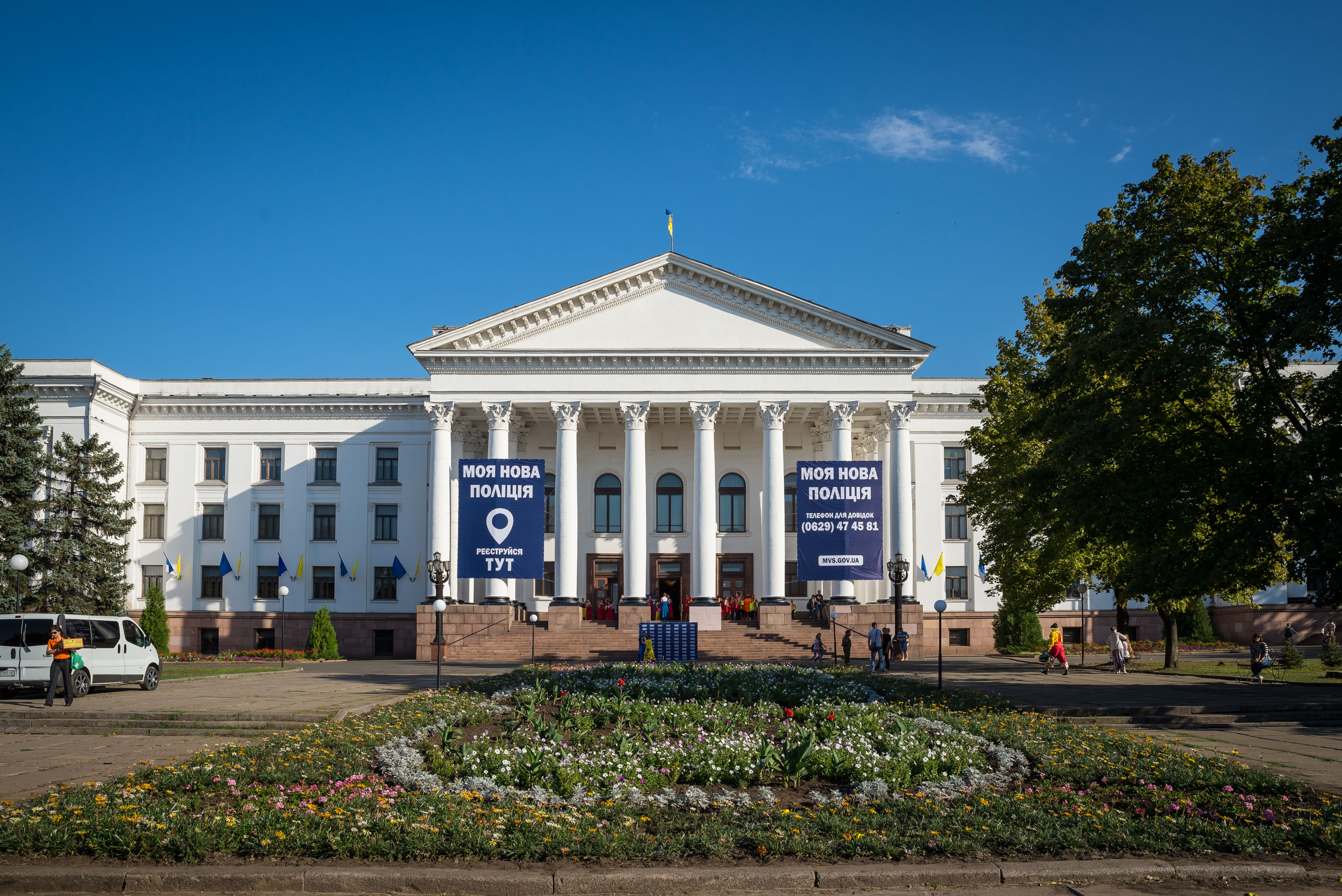
NKMZ Palace of Culture and Technology

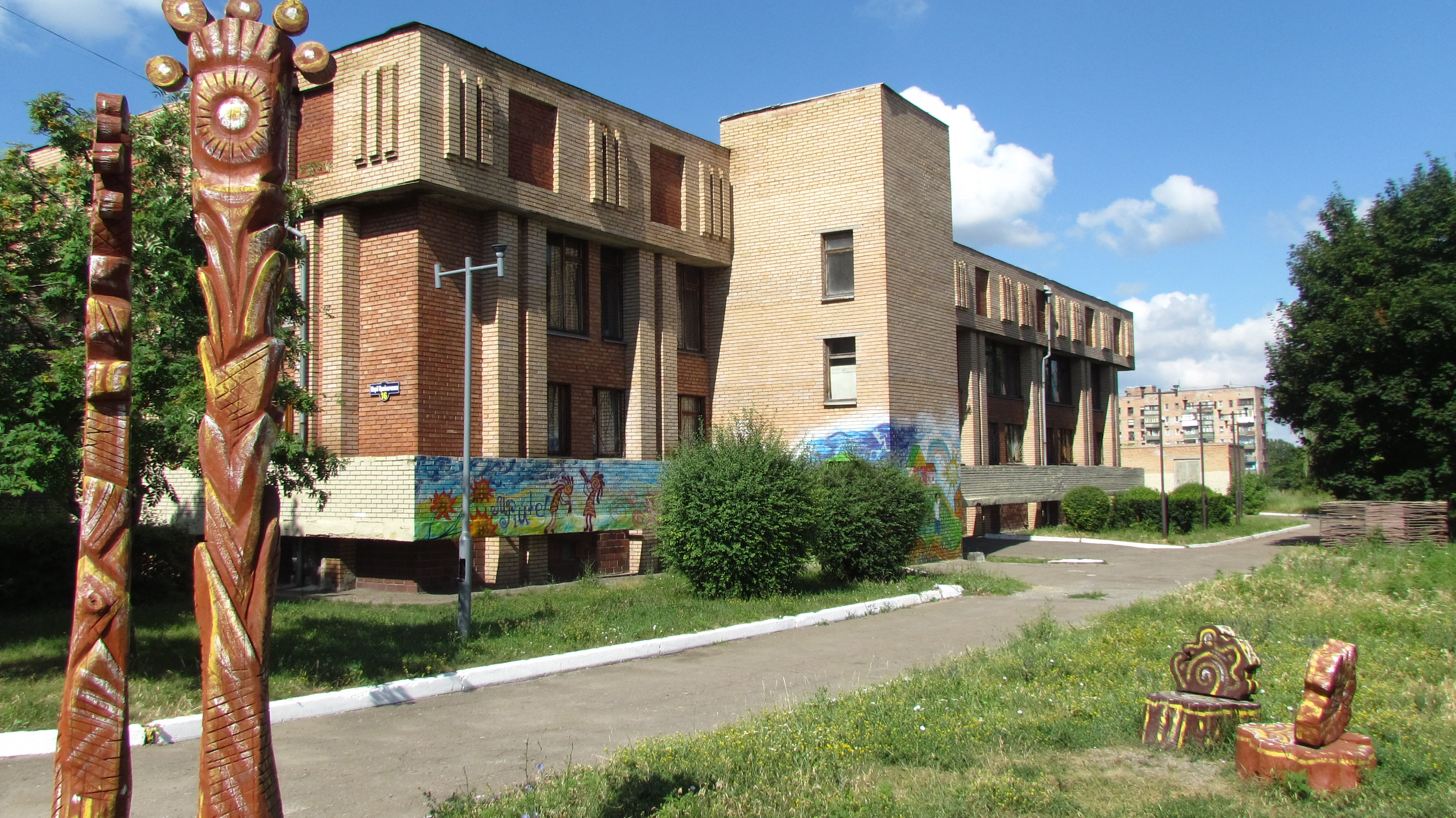
Central City Public Library

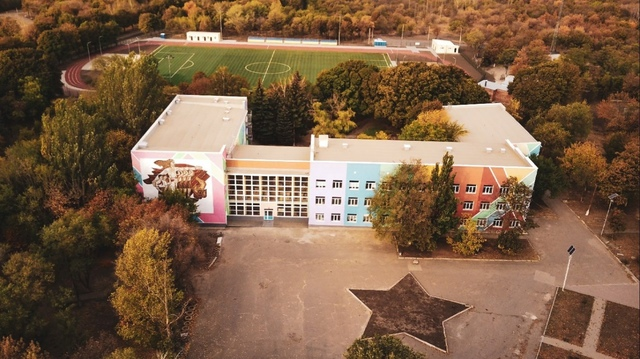
Center for Extracurricular Activities

== Sports ==
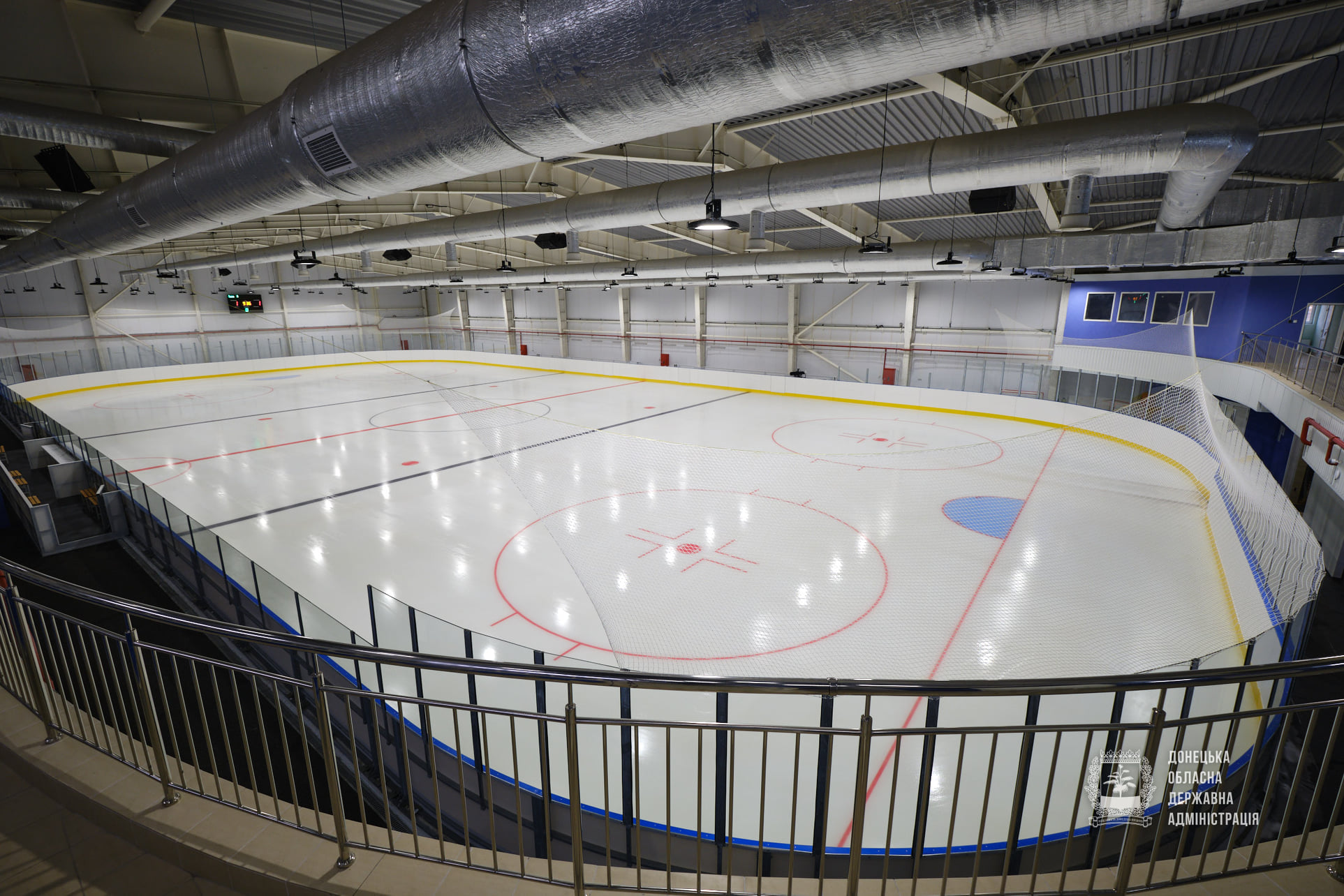
Ice Arena

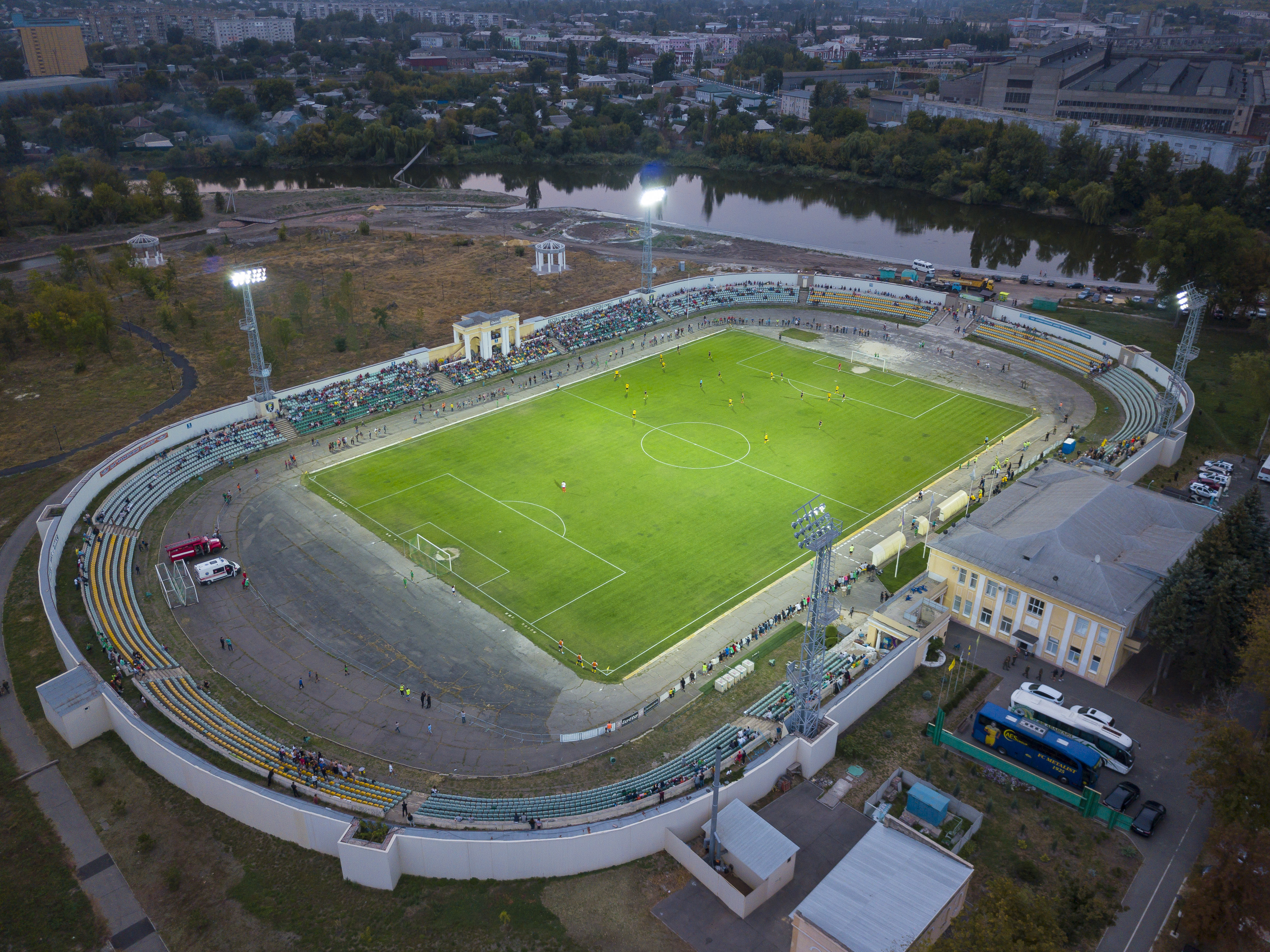
Prapor Stadium

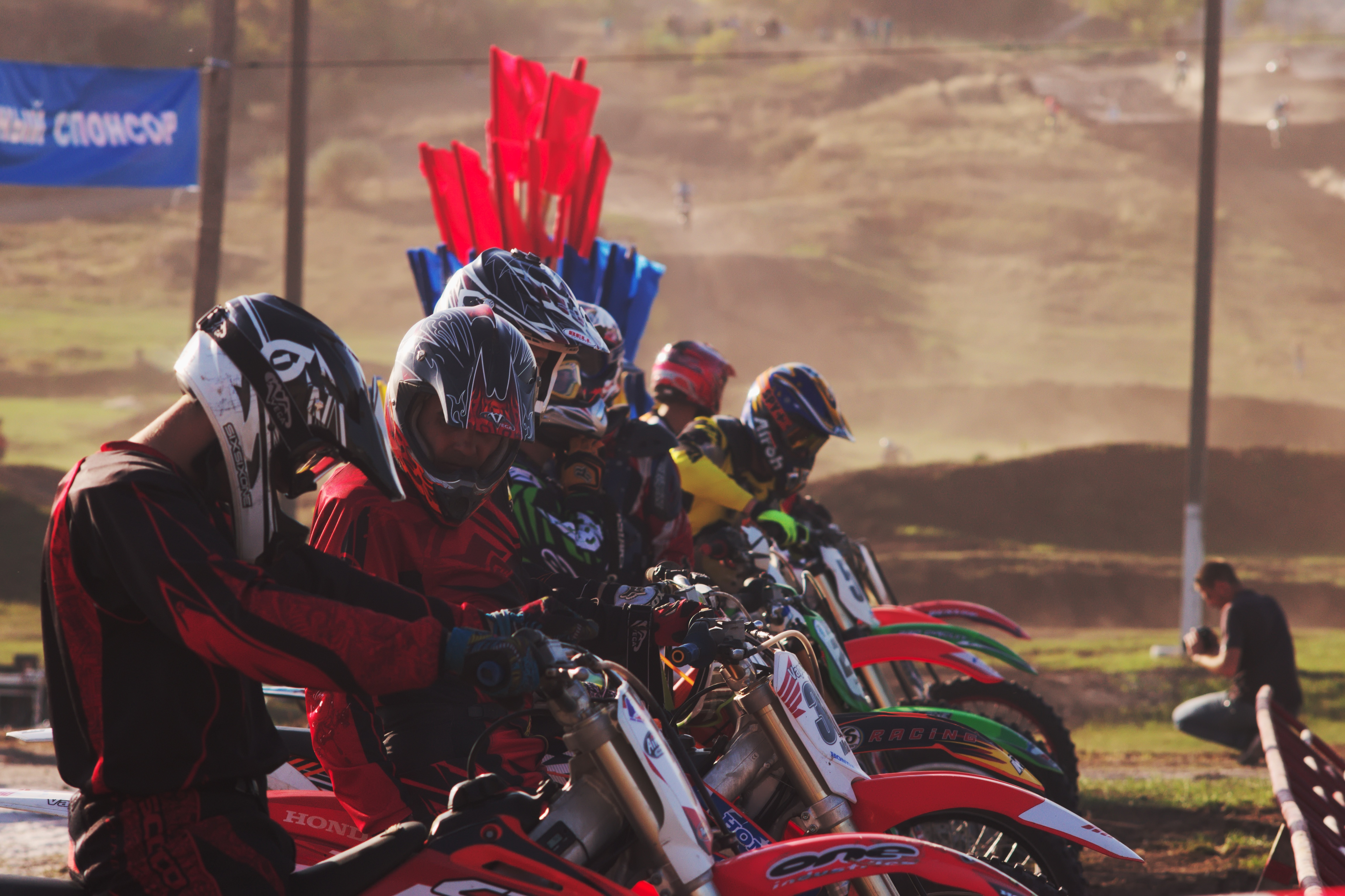
Motocross in Kutovaya Balka

The first sports society was founded in 1912.

The city has two stadiums: the Bliuminh Stadium (1937, 1956, owned by NKMZ) in Pushkin Park with a grandstand capacity of 8,055, and the Prapor Stadium in Bernatsky Garden (1936, 1968, owned by SKMZ) with a capacity of 6,000. The largest indoor football pavilion in Ukraine was also built in Bernatsky Garden.

The football team FC Kramatorsk played at the "Prapor" stadium. The VVS club was also previously based in the city.

Kramatorsk has two swimming pools: one in the NKMZ Palace of Culture (built in 1963, the first in the Donetsk region) and one in the sports complex of Vocational School No. 28.

An annual motocross race is held in Kutova Balka on City Day in September.

A new ice rink was officially opened in 2021. Since July 2021, the city has been home to two hockey teams: HC Kramatorsk and HC Donbass.

== Parks and squares ==
There are three large parks in the city:

- Yubileyny Park, 100 hectares;
- Bernatsky Garden, 55 hectares, founded as a city garden in 1897, known as Lenin Park in 1927, and Bernatsky Garden since 2016; 55 hectares;
- Pushkin Park, 1933–1934, 1970, area 25 hectares.

Also available:

- Heroes' Square (the Leonid Bykov Community Center is located here).
- An embankment is under construction along the Kazenny Torets River in the Bernatsky Garden Park.

== Twin towns ==
United States, Stamford, Connecticut – On 6 April 2023 officially announced Kramatorsk as their sister city.

Ukraine, Perechyn, Zakarpattia Oblast

== Gallery ==
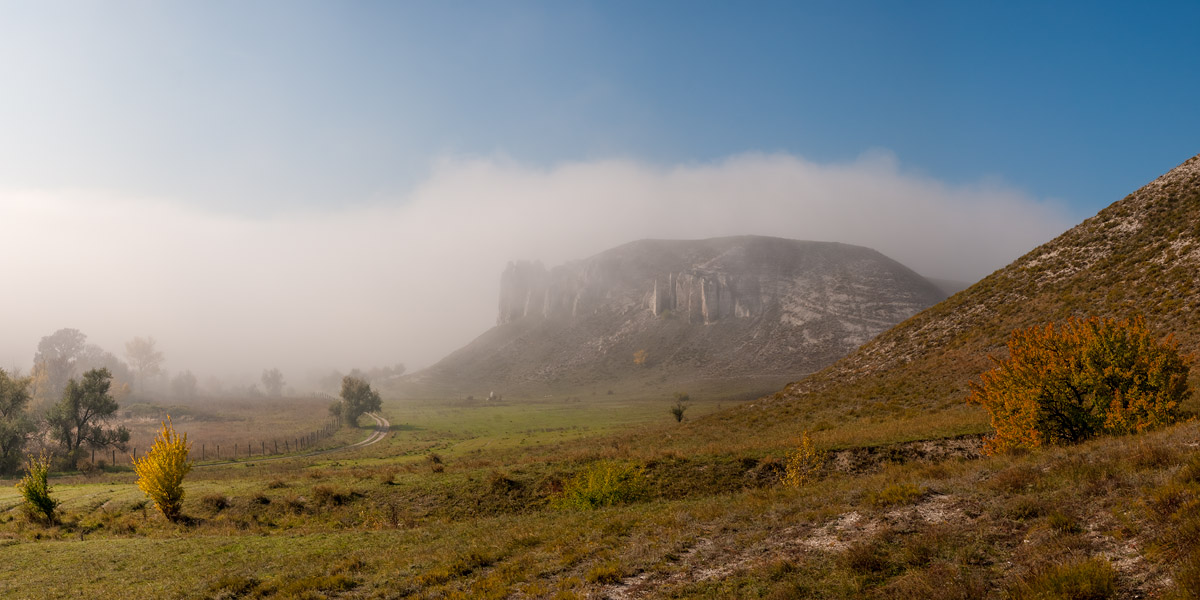
Kramatorsk landscape park

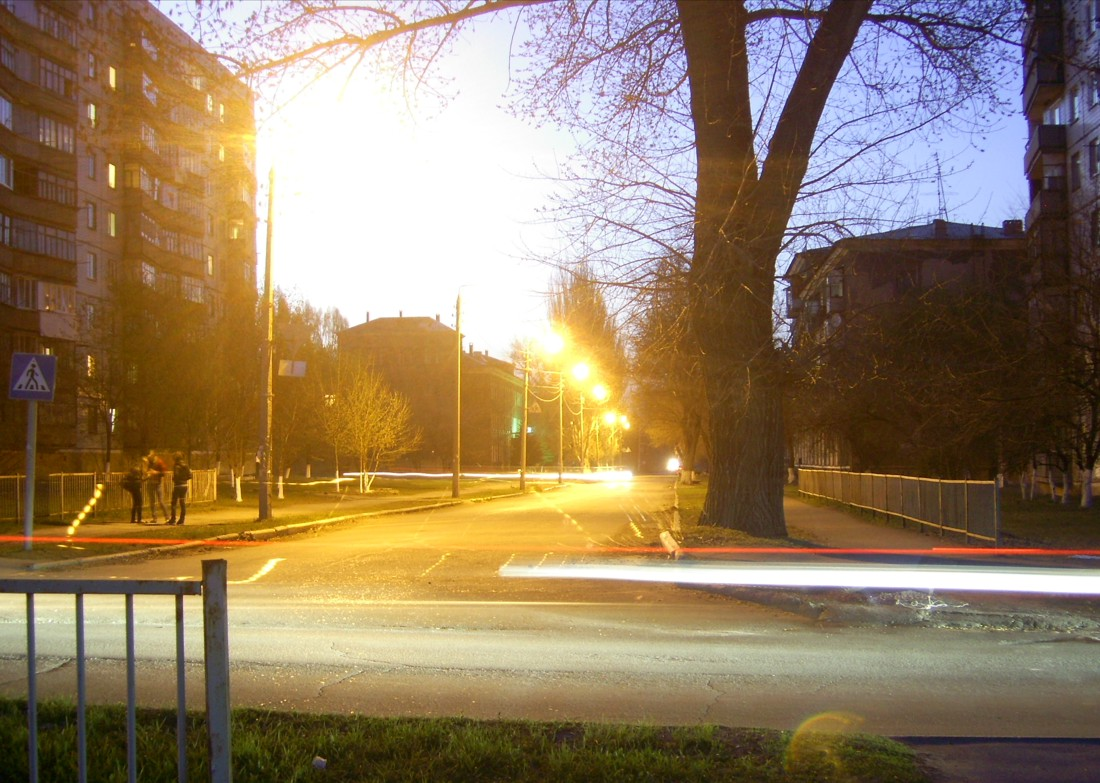
Street junction in Kramatorsk

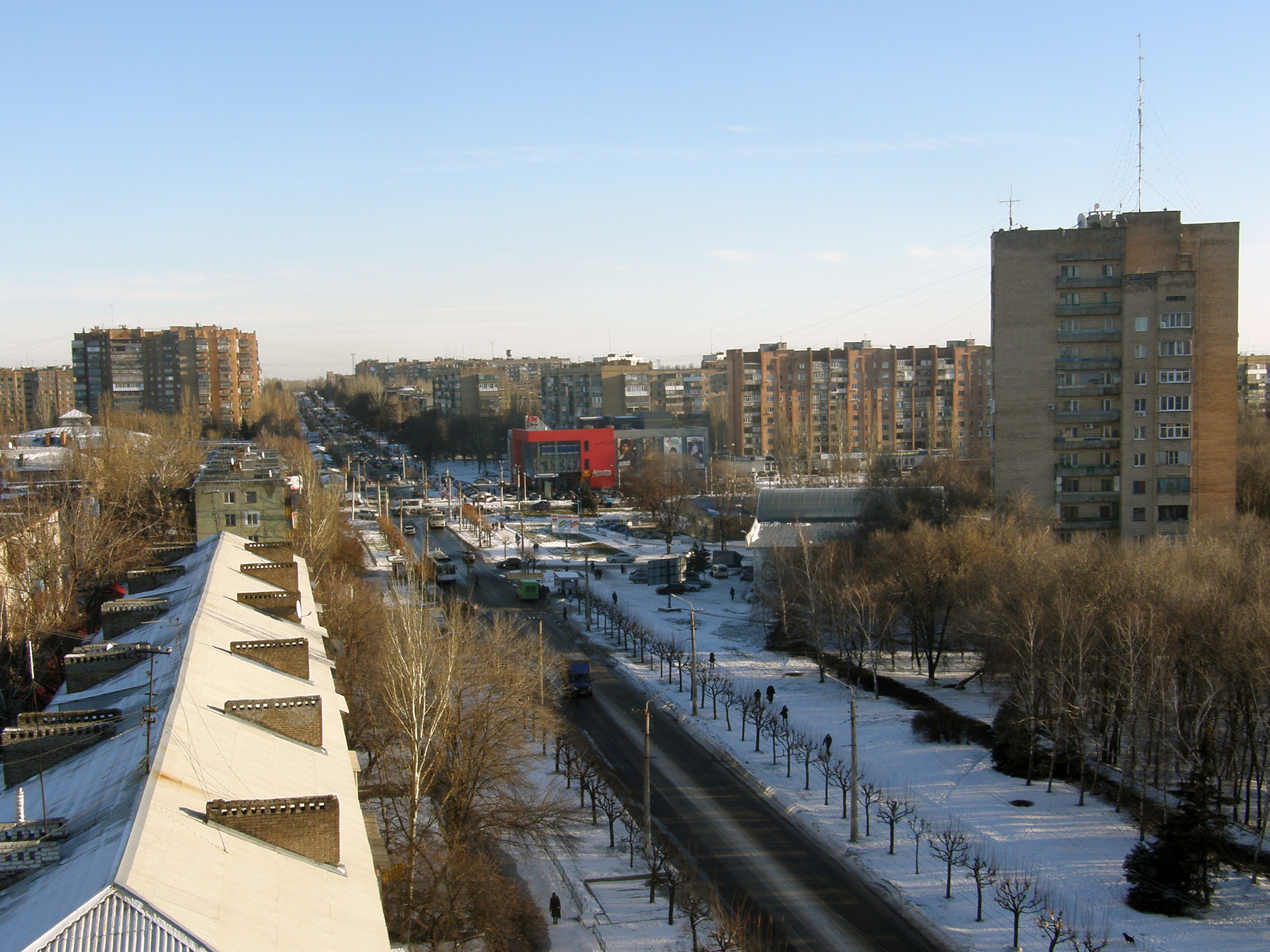
Apartment blocks in Kramatorsk

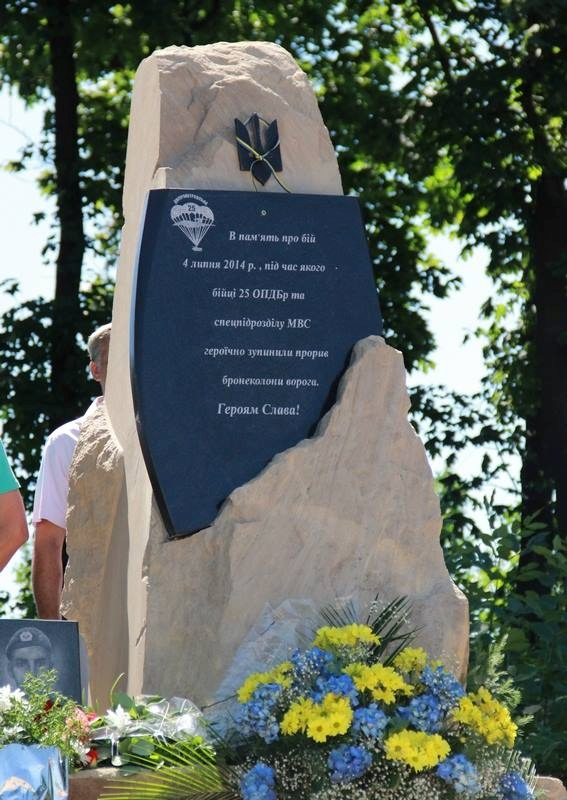
Monument to Oleksandr Serebryakov and Roman Mendel, who died during the Siege of Sloviansk and the Battle of Kramatorsk

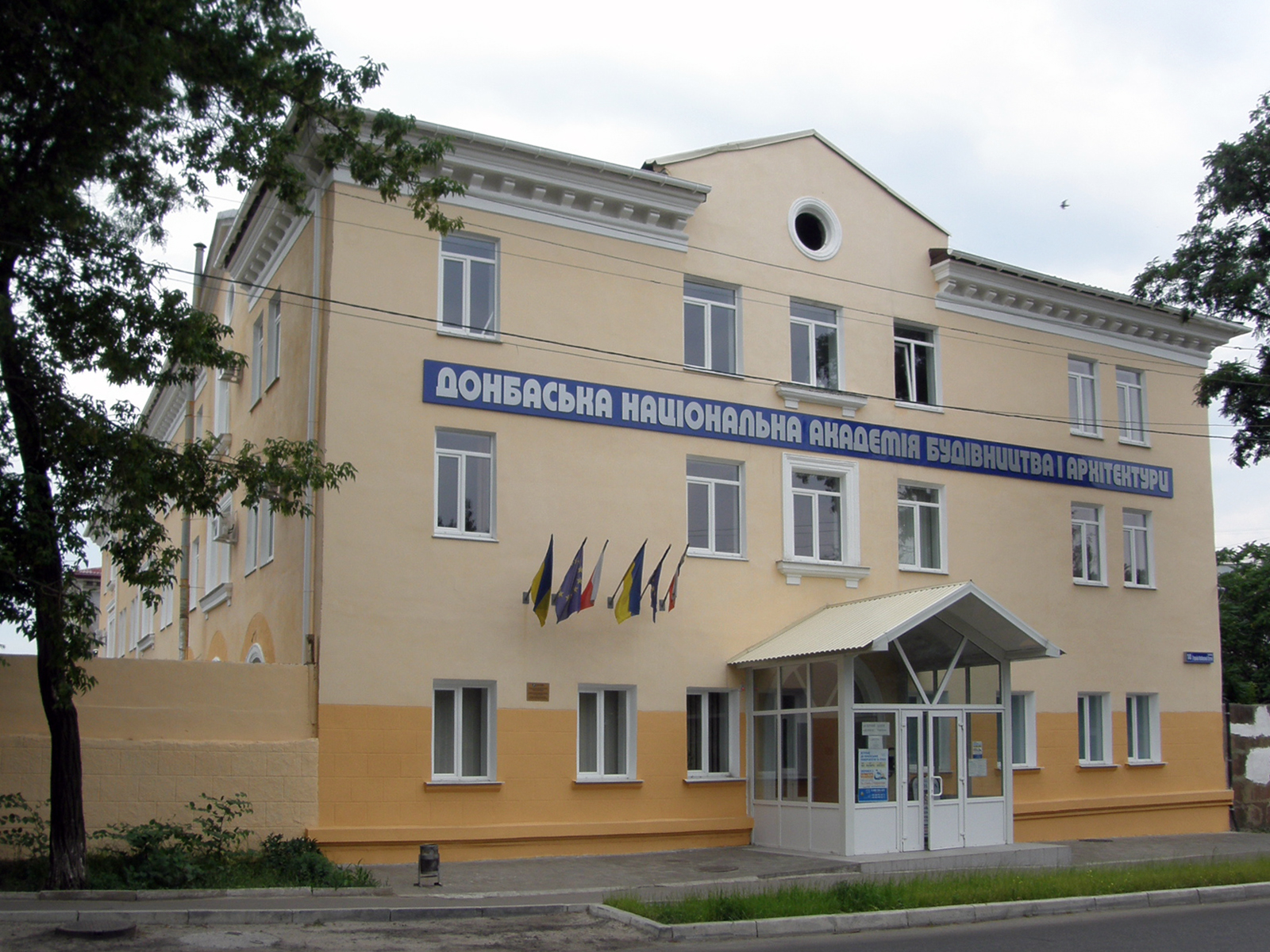
Donbas National Academy of Civil Engineering and Architecture

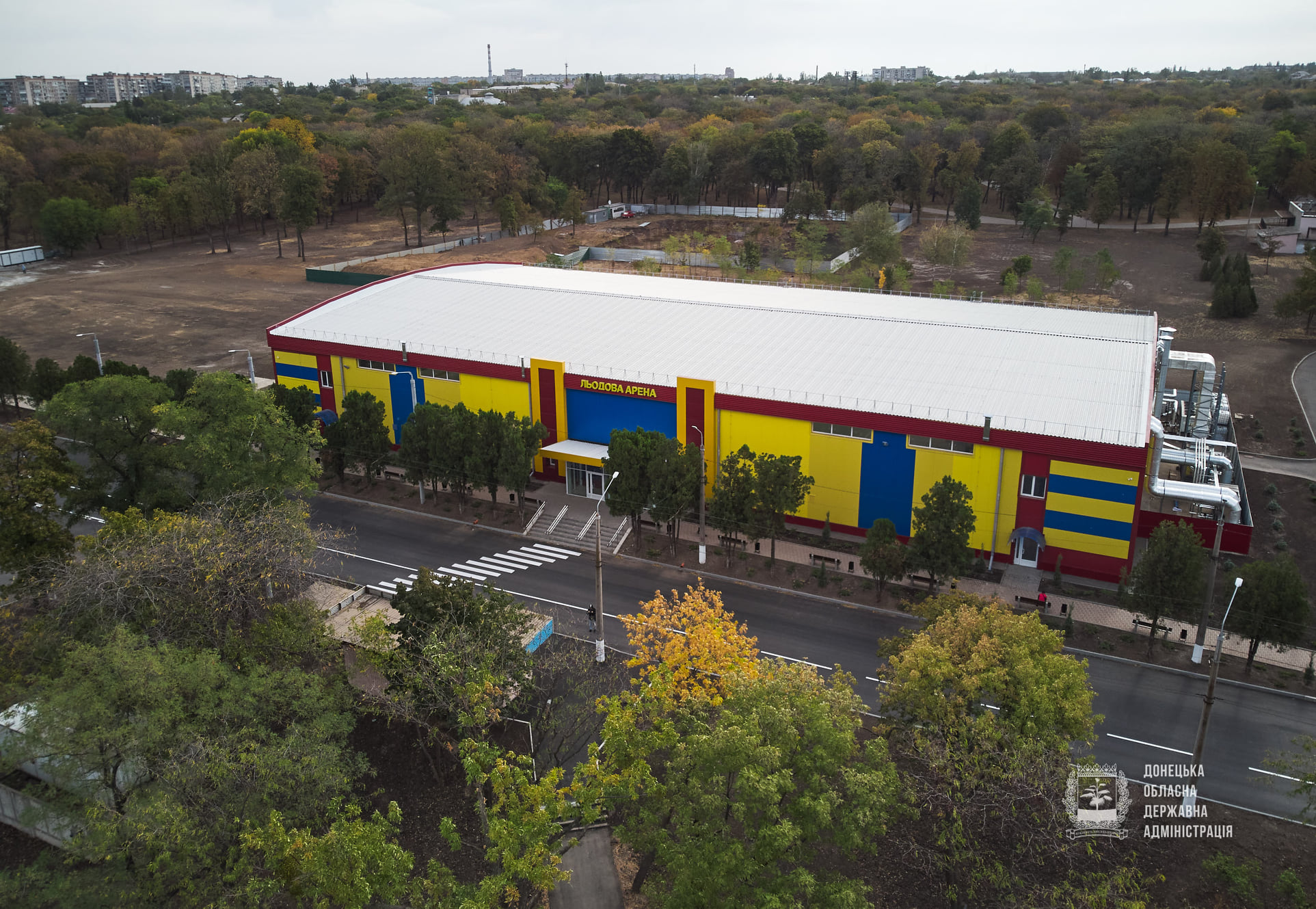
Ice Arena

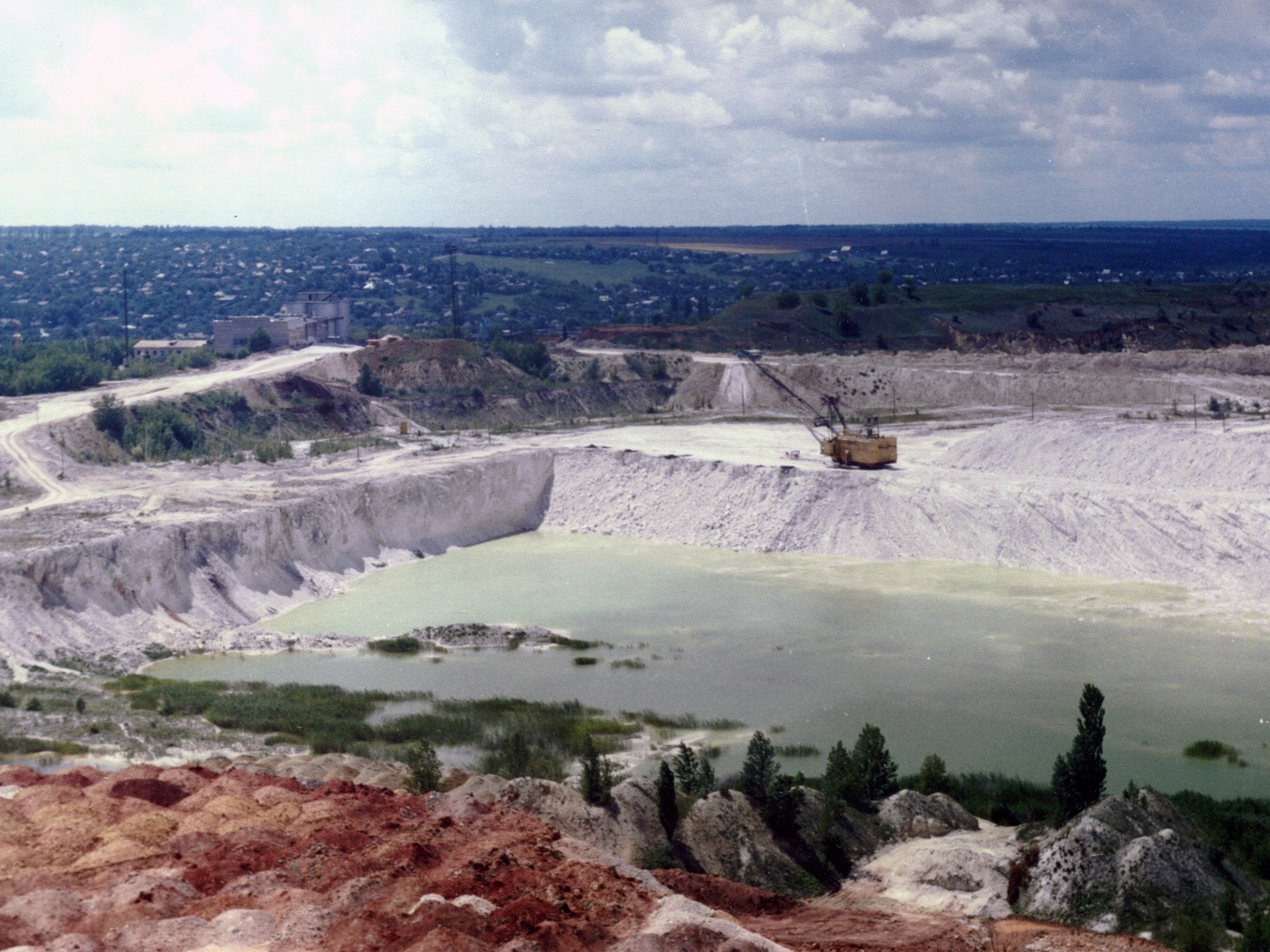
Quarry at the Melova (Chalk) Hill

== Notable people ==
At various periods, Kramatorsk was a place of residence for a number of notable people, including Leonid Bykov, Joseph Kobzon, and Ruslan Ponomariov.

- Halyna Bezruk (born 1988), Ukrainian singer and actress
- Anatoliy Blyznyuk (born 1948), Ukrainian politician and former governor of the Donetsk Oblast
- Leonid Bykov (1928–1979), Soviet Ukrainian actor and film maker
- Stepan Chubenko (1997–2014), Ukrainian soccer player
- Yevhen Halchuk (born 1992), Ukrainian soccer goalkeeper
- Valeriy Herovkin (1999–2021) Ukrainian soldier fallen in the Russo-Ukrainian War, awarded with the Order for Courage
- Tatiana Kononenko (born 1978), Ukrainian chess player
- Oleh Kotenko (born 1970), Euromaidan activist and volunteer soldier during the Russo-Ukrainian War
- Anna Kurkurina (born 1966), Ukrainian powerlifter and animal rights activist
- Kostyantyn Kuzmenko (1985–2022), Ukrainian soldier, awarded with the Order for Courage
- Maksym Maksymenko (born 1990), Ukrainian soccer player
- Ihor Moroz (born 1970), Ukrainian politician and former governor of the Donetsk Oblast
- Maxim Rysanov (born 1978), Ukrainian violist and conductor
- Serhii Shevchenko (born 1960), Ukrainian journalist and writer
- Andriy Sirchenko (1973–2017), decorated Ukrainian soldier
- Natalia Veselnitskaya (born 1975), prominent Russian attorney during the Russian interference in the 2016 United States elections
- Pavlo Vyshebaba (born 1986), Ukrainian activist and writer
- Yaroslav Yeremenko (born 1989), Ukrainian DJ and producer, who was kidnapped by Russian proxy forces
