= Pavlo Vyshebaba =

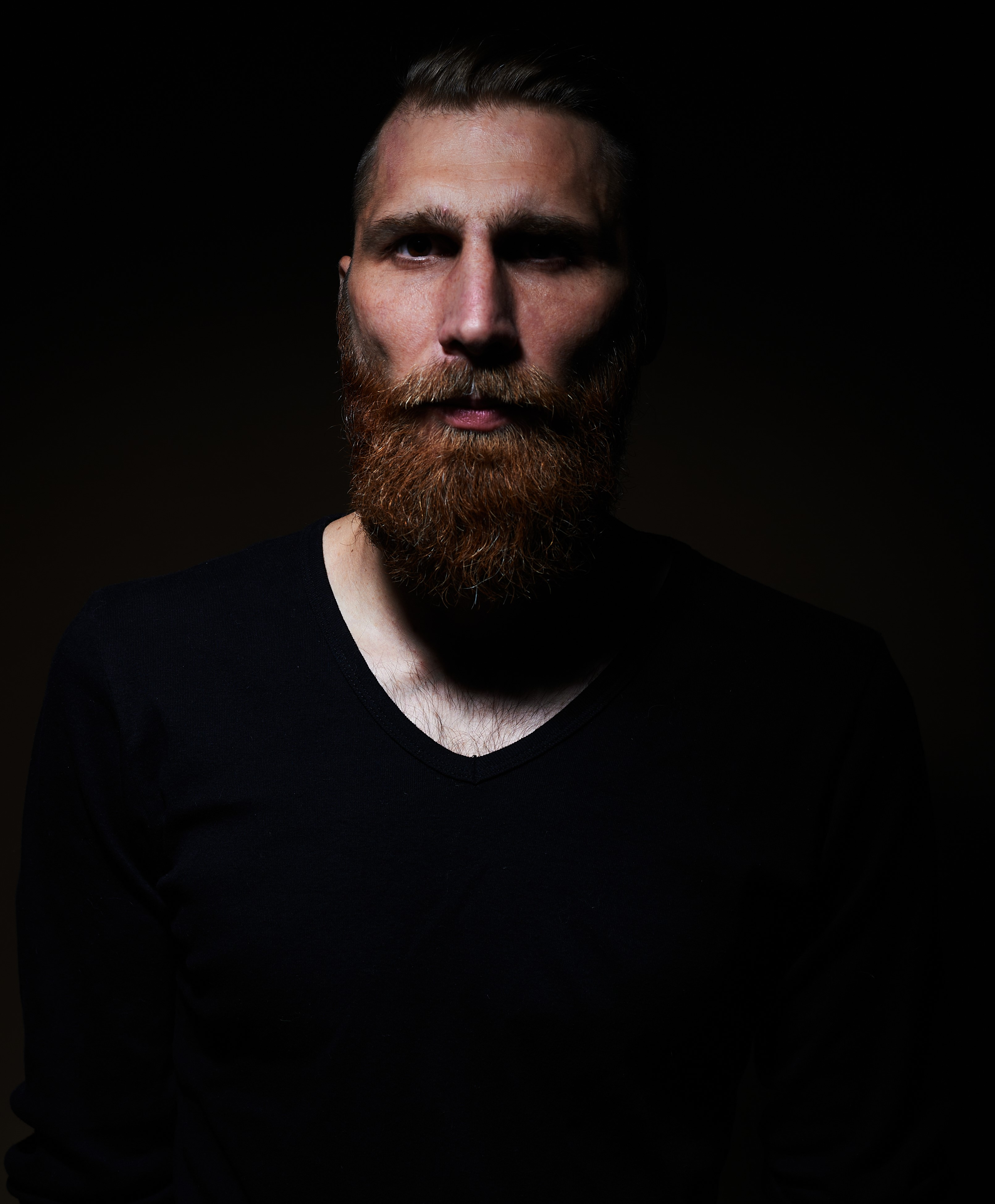
- Born: March 28, 1986; Kramatorsk, Ukrainian Soviet Socialist Republic, now Ukraine
- Occupations: environmental activist, writer, musician

Pavlo Oleksandrovych Vyshebaba (born March 28, 1986, in Kramatorsk, Donetsk region, Soviet Union) is a Ukrainian eco-activist, musician and writer. Co-founder and head of the "One Planet" NGO, UNDP envoy for tolerance in Ukraine.

== Early life and education ==
Pavlo Vyshebaba was born in Kramatorsk. He began studying engineering at the Donbas Machine-Building Academy, but after the third year he withdrew and enrolled in journalism at the Mariupol State University. During his studies, he worked for three years in the newspaper "Priazovsky rabochy".

As a child, Vyshebaba was not admitted to the Kramatorsk music school, noting that he lacked any musical abilities.

In 2012, after graduating with honors from the university, he moved to Kyiv. Took an active part in the Revolution of Dignity, in particular in the work of the press center of the National Resistance Headquarters. After the overthrow of the Yanukovych regime, he worked for a year and a half in the press service of the Cabinet of ministers of Ukraine, dealing with international communication and relations between ministries.

He refused to use the Russian language, switching to Ukrainian, arguing that this act was the occupation of Kramatorsk by "mercenaries of the Russian Federation and collaborators".

In 2013, he became a vegetarian, in 2015 he became a vegan, finally giving up seafood and clothing made from animals.

== One Planet ==
On April 13, 2016, he opened the first vegan café "One Planet" in Ukraine. In August of the same year, he founded a musical orchestra dedicated to performing original music and songs dedicated to the harmony of man and nature. During the summer of 2017, "One Planet Orchestra" collected more than 45 thousand Ukrainian hryvnia on the crowdfunding platform "Spilnokost", becoming the first Ukrainian band to receive full public funding for the recording of an album.

In December 2016, he co-founded the "One Planet" public organization, the goals of which are to end animal exploitation, ban fur farms, eliminate species discrimination, combat climate change and species extinction.

== Activism ==
In 2017, Pavlo Vyshebaba was elected as the ambassador for tolerance issues of UNDP in Ukraine.

He first gained general notoriety due to his participation in the "KhutroOFF" anti-fur campaign. In September 2018, a petition created by Vyshebaba to the Verkhovna Rada regarding the ban on fur production in Ukraine received 27,000 signatures, which at that time became the historical maximum of public support. On November 26 of the same year, Vyshebaba was doused with green tea by his opponents during a rally against the lifting of the ban on moose hunting, which is listed in the Red Book of Ukraine.

At the beginning of 2019, Pavlo Vyshebaba led the fight against the construction of a mink farm by a Dutch industrialist in the village of Pidhirne, in Volyn. He also initiated the creation and took an active part in the development of the draft law on banning fur production in Ukraine No. 10019, which was registered in the Verkhovna Rada on February 7, 2019.

After beginning of Russian invasion of Ukraine, he volunteered for the Ukrainian Armed Forces to fight in the Donbas region.

His poetry "Please, do not write me about the war" (укр. Тільки не пиши мені про війну) gained attention and became famous in Ukraine and several countries.

In 2022, he published his book of poetry "Please, do not write me about the war" (укр. Тільки не пиши мені про війну).
