= Bilenke, Donetsk Oblast =

Urban locality in Donetsk Oblast, Ukraine

Bilenke Біленьке
- Rural settlement
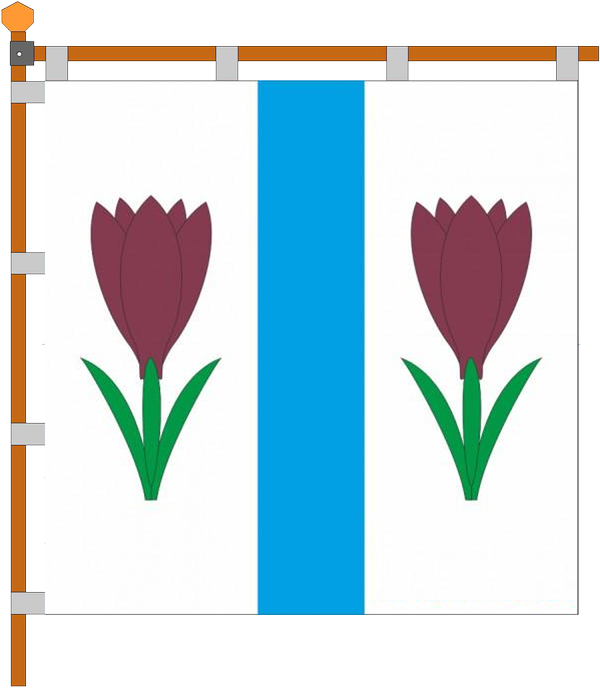
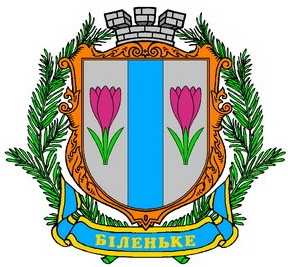
- Flag Coat of arms

- Location within Donetsk Oblast Location within Ukraine
- Coordinates: 48°45′59″N 37°37′53″E
- Country: Ukraine
- Oblast: Donetsk Oblast
- Raion: Kramatorsk Raion

Population (2022)
  - Total: 9,441
- Time zone: UTC+2 (EET)
  - Summer (DST): UTC+3 (EEST)

Bilenke (Ukrainian: Біленьке) is a rural settlement in Kramatorsk Raion, Donetsk Oblast, eastern Ukraine. It belongs to Kramatorsk urban hromada, one of the hromadas of Ukraine. Population: 9,441 (2022 estimate).

== Demographics ==
Native language as of the Ukrainian Census of 2001:

- Ukrainian 57.96%
- Russian 40.50%
- Armenian 0.82%
- Hungarian 0.33%
- Belarusian 0.12%
- Moldovan 0.03%
- German and Polish 0.01%

== Notable people ==
- Oleksandr Honcharenko (born 1974), Ukrainian politician
