= Oleksandr Honcharenko =

Ukrainian politician (born 1974)

- Олександр Гончаренко

Mayor of Kramatorsk
- Incumbent
- Assumed office 18 November 2020
- Preceded by: Andriy Pankov

Member of the Kramatorsk City Council
- In office 2010 – 18 November 2020

Personal details
- Born: 11 August 1974 (age 51) Bilenke, Ukrainian SSR, Soviet Union
- Children: 1

Oleksandr Vaslyovych Honcharenko (Ukrainian: Олександр Васильович Гончаренко; born 11 August 1974) is a Ukrainian politician, who is the mayor of Kramatorsk since 18 November 2020.

He was previously a member of the Kramatorsk City Council from 2010 to 2020. He was a member of the Party of Regions from 2010 to 2015 and also the Our Land party.

== Biography ==
Oleksandr Honcharenko was born on 11 August 1974 in Bilenke, Kramatorsk district.

=== Education ===
In 1991, he graduated from Kramatorsk Secondary School No. 22, where he studied with the future politician and entrepreneur Maxim Yefimov. He studied at the University of Bern with a degree in business economics, but eventually graduated from Donetsk National University with a degree in finance and credit.

He was the marketing and sales director at the Energomashspetsstal plant. He was a co-owner of the Kramatorsk Krobit enterprise and the Yasnogorovskoye farm.

Honcharenko speaks those foreign languages: English, and German, at a perfect level.

=== Employment ===
From 1991 to 1996, he worked as a computer operator in the joint venture "Fistag Victoria".

From February to August 1997, he was the director at the Limited Liability Company "All Consumer Goods".

From 1997 to 1998, he was the commercial director at the limited liability company "Kramatorsk multi-industry company".

From 1998 to 2000, he became the general director of the Limited Liability Company "Satellit Net Service".

From 2000 to 2002, he was the head of the commercial department of the Open Joint-Stock Company "Energomashspetsstal".

From 2002 to 2006, he was promoted to the deputy director for commercial issues of "Energomashspetsstal".

From 2006 to 2007, he was the deputy director of marketing and sales of "Energomashspetsstal".

In 2007, he became the director of marketing and sales of Energomashspetsstal.

=== Political activity ===
In 2010, Honcharenko won the majority district in the village of Yasnohirtsi, becoming a member of the Kramatorsk City Council from the Party of Regions and was appointed chairman of the permanent planning and budget commission.

During the early parliamentary elections of 2014, he was the proxy of candidate Yefimov.

In the local elections of 2015, he was reelected as a member of the Kramatorsk City Council the VII convocation from the "Our Land" party, once again heading the permanent commission on social and economic development, planning, budget, finance, and foreign economic activities.

Honcharenko took part in the 2020 elections as a self-nominated independent, offering voters a program called "Kramatorsk Strategy". During the election race, hee was supported by "Opposition Platform - For Life", "Maxim Efimov's Party "Nash Kramatorsk"" and the Servant of the People party.

In the first round, he won 48.61% of the votes. In the second round, he defeated the current mayor Andriy Pankov, gaining 57% of the vote. After the publication of the exit polls, the winner was congratulated by People's Deputy from the Opposition Platform, Nataliya Korolevska.

In March 2021, a project to dismantle advertising structures from the central streets began under the slogan: "In Kramatorsk there is something to see even without advertising!"

== Family ==
He is married and has a daughter.
