= Yaroslav Yeremenko =

DJ JARR
- Born: Yaroslav Olehovych Yeromenko; 20 January 1989 (age 36); Kramatorsk, Donetsk Oblast, Ukrainian SSR, Soviet Union (now Ukraine)
- Origin: Kramatorsk, Ukraine
- Genres: Electronica, Eurodance
- Occupations: DJ; record producer; remixer
- Years active: 2014–present
- Labels: Kalina Music

Yaroslav Olehovych Yeremenko (Ukrainian: Єременко Ярослав Олегович, born 20 January 1989), better known as DJ JARR, is a Ukrainian DJ, music producer and remixer from Kramatorsk.

== Early life ==
Yeremenko was born on January 20, 1989, in Kramatorsk. His father Oleh Yeremenko was general director of the Star Kramatorsk machine-building plant, and deputy of Kramatorsk City Council. Yeremenko's father taught him love to music. Yeremenko went to music school to study guitar, but he did not finish his studies.

At age 16, he went to England where he studied English. He lived in Brighton where he became interested of electronic music, clubs and nightlife. After returning to Ukraine, he began play electronic music.

He became a DJ at the main disco of Kramatorsk. In 2007 Yeremenko went to Kyiv to enter Shevchenko University, as his family advised him, but eventually chose the Kyiv Institute of International Relations. The 17th of April 2007 year, Yeremenko's father died in a car accident. Yeremenko returned to Kramatorsk after his father's death. He enrolled into the Donbas Machine-Building Academy to become an engineer, and then worked as a sales manager of the Energomashspetsstal factory.

== Arrest ==
Yeremenko bought a console, controllers and acted at home closed parties in Kramatorsk. He decided to start a business in Sviatohirsk. He worked in marketing communications, especially digital-technology. On 27 April 2014 Yeromenko was stopped by the armed formations of the self-proclaimed DPR at a roadblock on the Kramatorsk-Sviatohirsk road near Sloviansk. In the trunk of his car the guards found a fan scarf of the Ukraine national football team and photos with the flag of Ukraine in his phone. Yeremenko had never taking an active part in politics. In spite of this, the guards suspected Yeremenko of connections with the Right Sector. He was declared an "enemy of the republic" and sentenced to immediate execution. However, this decision was later canceled. It was decided to send Yeremenko to Sloviansk for further clarification. He was tortured and beaten and forced to shout "Glory to Ukraine" and sing the national anthem of Ukraine.

"Especially, I was tortured because I being a local and do not support the new regime. The blue and yellow scarf found in the trunk was tied round my neck and the warders passing by me periodically choked me to them."

In the basement of the SBU building in militant-controlled Sloviansk, Yeremenko was in the same cell with two other abducted locals, namedly stage-manager Pavlo Yurov and artist Denys Hryshchuk, all of whom also were also subject to torture and beatings. Thanks to the efforts of Yeremenko's mother, he was released from captivity. On 1 May 2014, after spending four days in the basement, he was released. His car was confiscated in favor of the self-proclaimed Donetsk People's Republic. After his release, he was taken beyond the roadblock, a bandage was removed from his eyes, and he was ordered to go without turning around. Enterprises belonging to his family were looted. Warehouses that Yeremenko rented were cut to scrap metal.

== Career ==
After his release, Yeremenko left Kramatorsk and went to his relatives in Dnipropetrovsk, and from there to Kyiv. After return to Kyiv, he decided to become a professional musician. He stated,

"All these crazy experiences helped me to realize the value of each day of our short and such a fragile life. Now I really care about every hour I've been given». «I dreamed of doing music all my life - doubts, the belief that there are ways «right» and "wrong" before all these events kept me from the employment that I dreamed of doing. A senseless bloody war every day takes the lives of young, talented people who had something to say to this world. I narrowly escaped their fate, and now I have no right to miss my chance to make this world a little better."

He uses the techniques of musical groups such as Innervisions, Slowdance, Dixon and AME. In 2014 he organized a series of parties and auto-party on Vozdvizhenka in Kyiv, in the art space Sugar Package. He became acquainted with the producers of The Lab. After these parties, he was invited to the nightclub of The Lab, where they conducted a series of auto-parties, working with Dj Pitchboy. At one of the parties in The Lab where Eremenko worked, a silent Ukrainian film was shown. Yeremenko was offered the change to write music that would accompany the display of old paintings and newsreels. After that, he was invited by the National Oleksandr Dovzhenko Film Centre to create soundtracks for silent Ukrainian films of the middle and the end of the twentieth century. Together with Anton Baybakov he worked on the soundtrack to the film Dziga Vertova Eleventh.

He graduated from Kyiv Academy of Media Arts, majoring in Digital Film. Together with Pavel Yurov, whom Yeremenko had met while in captivity, they worked on a semi-documentary under the working title Je suis Donbass. The scenario included events that occurred during their arrival in the ATO zone in 2014. According to the writers, half of the film describes Yurov and half Yeromenko.

Yeremenko worked with producer Sergey Dotsenko and with Kalina Music. Yeremenko is the producer of the "JARR" projects for Packed Promo Group. He works with the Art-factory platform and Ukrainian artist Masha Zolotova. Yeremenko is not married.
