= Ukraine War Animals Relief Fund =

Humanitarian organization

- Formation: June 2022; 4 years ago
- Founder: Daniel Fine
- Type: Charitable organization
- Tax ID no.: 92-0430918
- Legal status: 501(c)(3)
- Purpose: Animal welfare
- Location: Edmonds, WA, United States
- Region served: Ukraine
- Founder: Daniel Fine
- Main organ: volunteer
- Website: uwarf.org

Ukraine War Animals Relief Fund is a non-profit organization that helps create awareness for the plight of abandoned animals and provides material support to animal rescue and animal shelter efforts in Ukraine. It is commonly referred to as UWARF.

== History ==
Ukraine War Animals Relief Fund was created in 2022 shortly after the Russian invasion into Ukraine. It was started by Daniel Fine, whom, early in the war went to Ukraine to help in animal welfare efforts, both working directly with animals and assisting with technology and building community around animal welfare volunteers, veterinarians and humanitarian services.

Fine’s first trip to help the animals of Ukraine was motivated by Lawrence Anthony's work about an elephant sanctuary, "The Elephant Whisperer," and the journey resulted in the creation of UWARF.

Taking a similar approach to Anthony. Dan captured subsequent visits on video and produced the documentary War Tails.

== Services ==
UWARF operates primarily in the United States and Canada. It provides funding, assists in securing and shipping veterinary supplies and equipment and provides technology support for Ukrainian-based rescue organizations.

The animal rescuers and shelters supported by UWARF attempt to reunite the animals left behind when their families evacuated their homes. Often the only evacuation route is via train, and the Ukrainian railroad does not allow animals on board.
