= Anna Kurkurina =

Ukrainian powerlifter and animal rights activist (born 1966)

- Куркуріна Ганна Іванівна
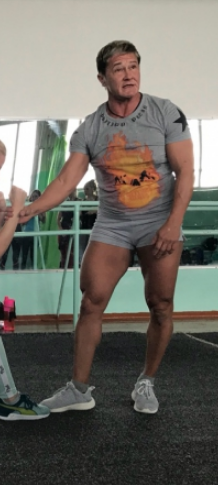
- Born: August 25, 1966 (age 60); Kramatorsk, Donetsk Oblast Soviet Union
- Education: Donetsk National University
- Occupations: power lifter, athletic trainer, animal rescuer
- Organization: Anna Kurkurina Charitable Foundation
- Known for: Powerlifting and animal rights activism

YouTube information
- Channel: AnnaKurkurina
- Subscribers: 876,000
- Views: 145,453,772
- Last updated: June 01, 2025

Anna Ivanovna Kurkurina (born 25 August 1966) is a Ukrainian powerlifter, influencer and animal rescue activist. Kurkurina holds numerous lifting records. A former biology teacher and zookeeper, since the 2022 invasion of Ukraine, Kurkurina has devoted herself to rescuing animals impacted by warfare.

== Biography ==
Kurkurina was born on 25 August 1966 in Kramatorsk, in Ukraine's Donetsk region. As a child, she often brought home stray animals, a habit her parents encouraged. During the second grade, she decided she wanted to work with animals as a career. Kurkurina would attend college at Donetsk National University where she would work on conservation and anti-poaching efforts, along studies in biology and zoology. After graduation, Kurkurina became a high-school biology teacher in Kherson, but soon begged for a role at Mykolaiv Zoo. There, she became a zoo technician responsible for the zoo's predators.

=== Power lifting ===
In 1998, Kurkurina began weight lifting as an amateur, developing her own exercises alongside her zoo work. Kurkurina initially became involved in lifting to feel better about her body, as she came out as a lesbian. In 2006 at age 40, Kurkurina focused herself on the goal of becoming the strongest woman on the planet. As a professional powerlifter, Kurkurina is open about her use of anabolic steroids, used under doctor supervision in an effort to make her body more masculine. In 2008, Kurkurina bench pressed 109 kilograms at the 2008 IPA World Powerlifting Championships, winning her class and set four world records. That year she began hosting a fitness program on television and started a YouTube channel. Kurkurina would eventually set 14 powerlifting records and become a three-time world champion. Kurkurina continues to teach a weekly women's fitness class, and works in one to train children with disabilities. Kurkurina's masculine physique, penchant for wearing male clothing and openness about her lesbian identity has made her the subject of bullying.

=== Animal rescue ===
In 2022, following Russia's invasion of Ukraine, Kurkurina remained in Mykolaiv, despite the region being the site of heavy attack. There, she devoted herself to rescuing animals that were impacted by warfare. Kurkurina had long been involved in animal rescue in the area, prior to the invasion. Using her YouTube channel and presence on Instagram, where she has more than 300,000 followers, Kurkurina raises funds for abandoned pets and collects and distributes food for their care. Kurkurina additionally rescues and rehabilitates animals from impacted areas. Kurkurina travels to frontline villages to rescue pets that have been abandoned by their owners. When asked why Kurkurina has remained in Mykolaiv and why she puts herself at risk to save animals, Kurkurina responds, "because it is the duty of the strong to protect the weak".

== On film ==
Kurkurina's activism has been the subject of several films. In 2020, she was a subject of the documentary Where is the dog buried? (Ukrainian: Де собака заритий?) highlighting her work on animal and LGBT rights. In 2024, Kurkurina was the subject of Everything Needs to Live (Polish: Wszystko ma zyc) by filmmakers Tetyana Dorodnitsyna and Andriy Lytvynenko. Everything Needs to Live was named Best Documentary at the goEast film festival, the Audience Award winner at the Krakow Film Festival, and won the RIGHTS NOW! award at the 21st Docudays UA International Human Rights Documentary Film Festival.
