= Azov Lubricants and Oils =

Ukrainian petrochemical company

«AZMOL British Petrochemicals»
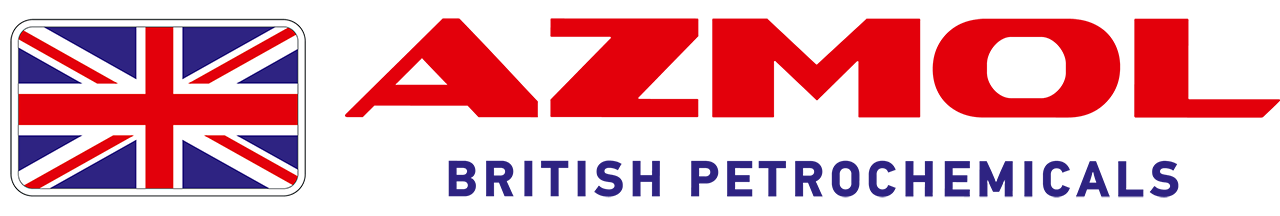

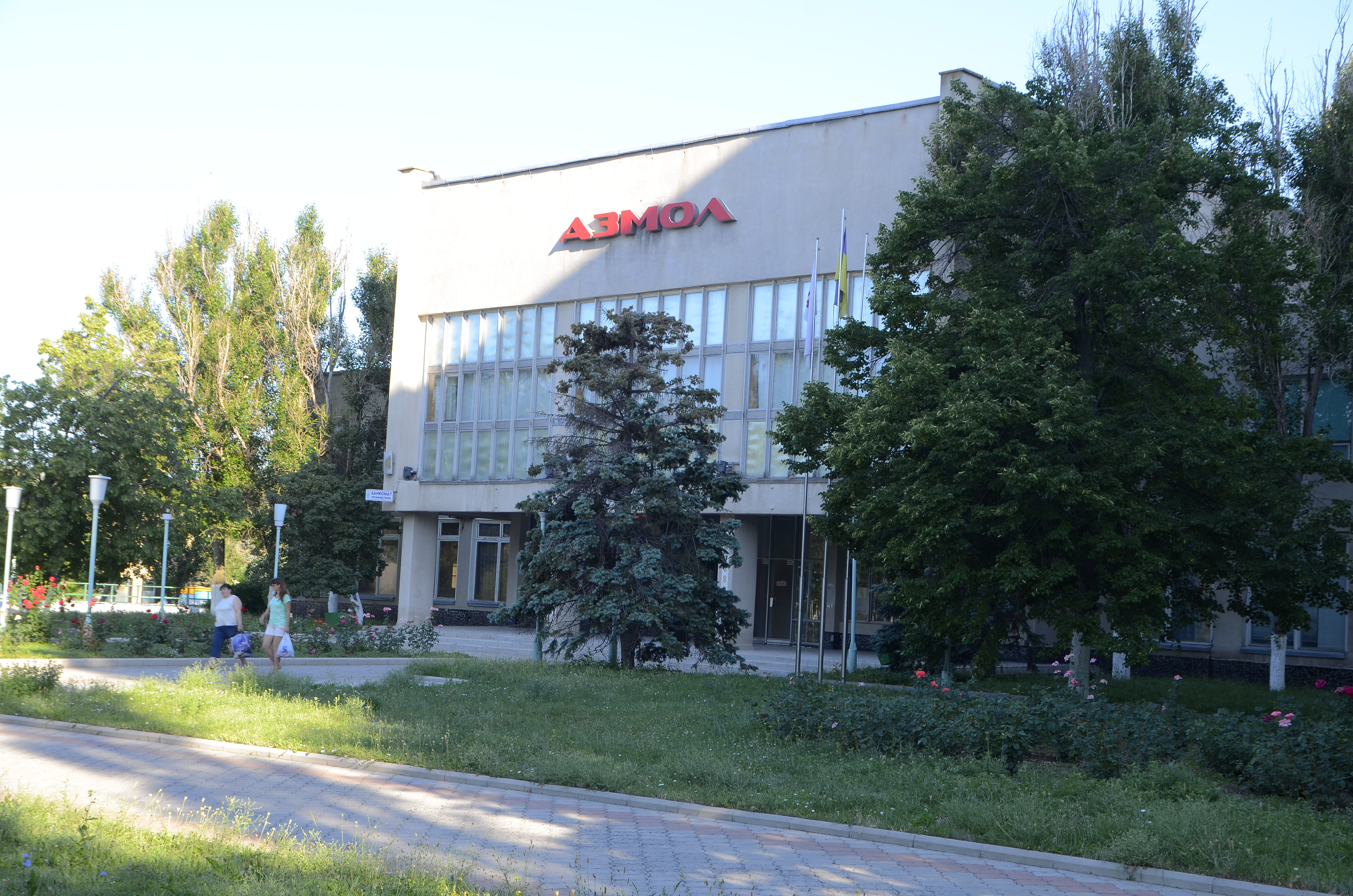
- Native name: Азовські мастила і оливи
- Type: Public Joint Stock Company
- Industry: Petrochemistry
- Headquarters: Berdiansk, Ukraine
- Products: motor oils, lubricants, coolants
- Website: www.azmol.eu

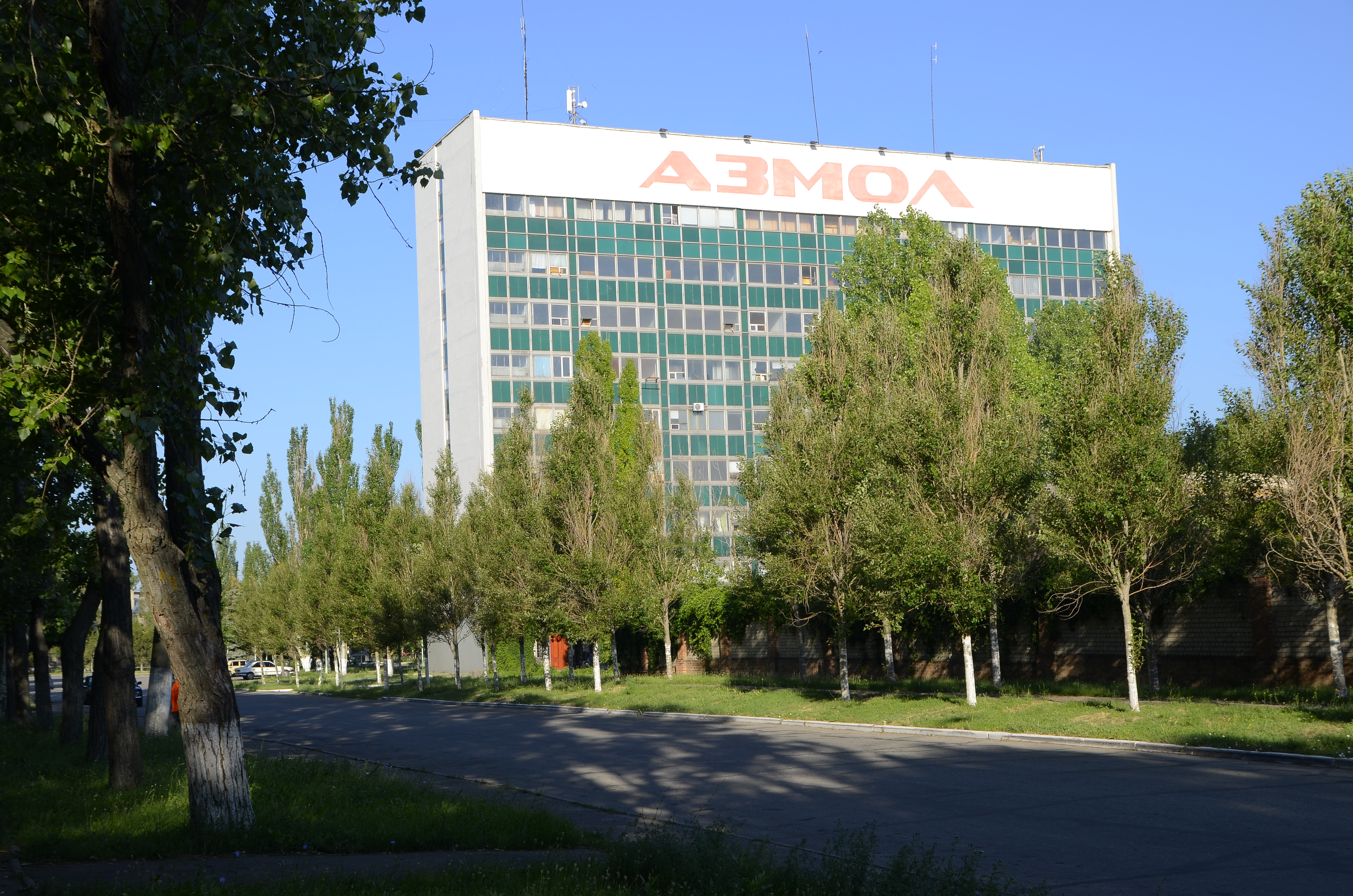

Azov Lubricants and Oils (AZMOL British Petrochemicals) is a petrochemical company located in Berdiansk, Zaporizhzhia Oblast. Today AZMOL British Petrochemicals is the largest producer of lubricants in Ukraine.

The company was founded in 1937 as Berdiansk Experimental Oil and Grease Plant, abbreviated as BONMZ. Following the collapse of the Soviet Union, it became a joint stock company and was restructured into the new name of Azov Lubricants and Oils, abbreviated as AZMOL. However, it struggled afterwards and went bankrupt, and entered liquidation proceedings in 2015 after the Commercial Court of Zaporizhzhia Oblast ruled against the State Property Fund of Ukraine's suggestion to simply restructure the company. However, it was revived in 2017, when it was bought by the British company Global Lubricants Ltd., and then rebranded as AZMOL British Petrochemicals. It then significantly expanded its production and exports to 54 countries by 2021. After the Russian invasion of Ukraine and the occupation of Berdiansk in 2022, the plant was seized by individuals aligned with MP Oleksandr Ponomaryov, leading the company to split. Its British owners relocated production to Asia, while the occupation authorities re-registered the plant and renamed it back to its Soviet-era name.

== History ==
The plant started operations in 1937 in Berdiansk. At the time, it was known under the name Berdiansk Experimental Oil and Grease Plant, abbreviated as BONMZ. Following the collapse of the Soviet Union and privatisation in Ukraine, it became a joint stock company in 1994, with the State Property Fund of Ukraine holding all of the company's shares. In 2006, however, it was announced that it would be fully privatised, and move away from the government. This never happened, though. By 2011, the company's net loss had risen to 27.1 million hryvnias, while net revenue had fallen more than fivefold compared to recent years. By October 2013 the plant had stopped operations due to wage debts that exceeded 10 million hryvnias, and it also had no functioning electricity, gas, or banking accounts. The director of the plant at the time said the company would restart operations in November 2013, but in December 2013, the Commercial Court of Zaporizhzhia Oblast announced bankruptcy proceedings for AZMOL.

In April 2015, after the completion of proceedings, the Commercial Court of Zaporizhzhia Oblast announced that AZMOL was formally bankrupt and that liquidation of the company would start, given that the company had no realistic prospects of restarting. During the proceedings, 18 creditors filed financial claims against the company. Meanwhile, the State Property Fund had opposed the liquidation and said that they preferred the restructuring of AZMOL, but they provided no arguments on how to do so effectively. In August 2016, all of the property of AZMOL was sold at auction for 101.5 million hryvnias, which was below the asking price set at 156 million hryvnias. Ultra Oil, based in Dnipro, was the one to buy it. However, just a few months later, in May 2017, it was announced that the British company Global Lubricants Ltd., under Terry Dicken, had taken over the plant and that it would resume production primarily to Azerbaijan, Uzbekistan, and Turkmenistan. Under the investment, the company was rebranded formally to AZMOL British Petrochemicals, and it was agreed that Dicken would modernise the equipment and bring in new jobs for Ukrainians.

By September 2017, the company had fully resumed production, establishing contracts in seven countries in Asia, particularly Central Asia. The company employed around 500 people at the time and held 7-8% of the Ukrainian lubricant market after having a total production of around 200,000 tonnes per year. Between this time and 2021, 10 million euros were invested into the plant to produce new bottling machinery, storage, and a production line for diesel exhaust fluids. In 2021, it was announced that AZMOL was exporting to 54 countries and was a major supplier for many Ukrainian clients like Motor Sich.

Following the Russian invasion of Ukraine and the occupation of Berdiansk shortly after by Russian forces, the plant was seized by individuals aligned with MP Oleksandr Ponomaryov. Ponomaryov later disputed allegations he had collaborated with the Russian occupation authorities, saying that he was tortured and coerced into cooperating by force. Thereafter, the company split into two. The British owners announced that they had relocated production to Kutaisi in the country of Georgia and later in 2023 in Chinaz in Uzbekistan. The Russian occupation authorities who had seized the plant in Berdiansk, retitled it to Azovskie Smazki i Masla and transferred it to state management under the Corporation for the Development of Zaporizhzhia Oblast in February 2024. It was also announced that they would later rename it back to BONMZ, the Soviet-era name, and that it was employing around 200 people.

== Awards ==
- Order of the Red Banner

== See also ==
- XADO
- WD-40
- Carl Bechem GmbH
