= Oleksandr Ponomaryov (politician) =

Ukrainian economist and politician

- Олександр Пономарьов
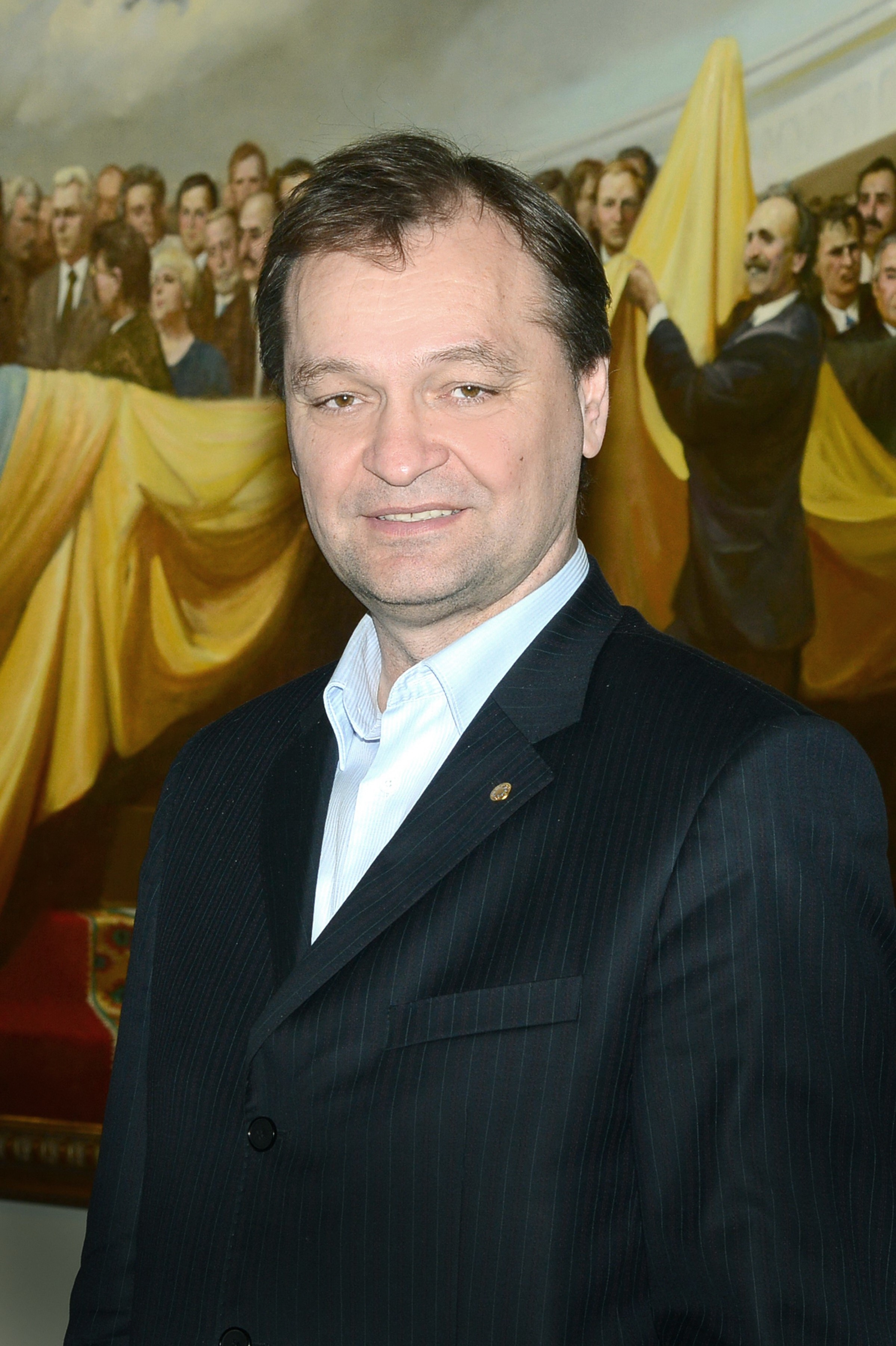

People's Deputy of Ukraine
- Incumbent
- Assumed office 12 December 2012
- Preceded by: Constituency established
- Constituency: Zaporizhzhia Oblast, No. 78

Personal details
- Born: 7 January 1962 (age 64) Berdiansk, Ukrainian SSR, Soviet Union (now Ukraine)
- Party: Platform for Life and Peace (since 2022)
- Other political affiliations: Independent (until 2019); OPZZh (2019–2022)
- Education: Zaporizhzhia National Technical University

Oleksandr Serhiyovych Ponomaryov (Ukrainian: Олександр Сергійович Пономарьов; born 7 January 1962) is a Ukrainian economist and politician. He has served as a People's Deputy of Ukraine since 12 December 2012 from Ukraine's 78th electoral district, representing south-eastern Zaporizhzhia Oblast.

== Education ==
He studied at the Chubar Zaporizhzhia Institute of Mechanical Engineering, Faculty of Electronic Engineering, and at the Academy of Management and Information Technologies (ARIU) of Zaporizhzhia National Technical University, majoring in Management.

He holds a Doctor of Economics with a specialization in “Economics and Business Management (by Type of Economic Activity),” as well as the academic title of Professor in the Department of Production, Business, and Management

== Labor activity ==
1980 - 1983 - mechanical assembly fitter at the "Pershotravnev plant" in Berdyansk, Zaporizhzhia region.

1983 - 1986 - traffic controller at the "Pershotravnev plant".

1986 - 1995 - technician for current repair and maintenance of radio equipment of the Communal motor vehicle enterprise in Berdyansk, Zaporizhzhia region.

1995 - 1997 - engaged in private entrepreneurial activities.

1998 — 2012 - Chairman of the Board of industrial holding company "Berdyanskyi Rayagroprompostach" , Berdyansk, Zaporizhia Region (Ukraine).

== Public and Political Activities ==
2002–2006 — Member of the Zaporizhzhia Regional Council.

2006 — Elected to the Executive Committee of the Berdiansk City Council.

2010–2012 — Member of the Zaporizhzhia Regional Council.

2012 — Member of the Verkhovna Rada of Ukraine (7th convocation), Electoral District No. 78, Zaporizhzhia Oblast, independent candidate. November 27, 2014 — Member of the Verkhovna Rada of Ukraine (8th convocation), Electoral District No. 78, Zaporizhzhia Oblast, independent candidate.

Member of the "Will of the People" parliamentary group.

Chair of the Subcommittee on Highways and Road Infrastructure of the Verkhovna Rada of Ukraine Committee on Transport.

== After Russian invasion of Ukraine ==
After the Russian invasion began, he returned from Kyiv to his home in Berdyansk city, which was still under Ukrainian control at the time. Two days later, the city fell under occupation, and he began providing humanitarian aid to local residents and refugees from Mariupol and border regions who were trying to reach territories controlled by Ukraine. He was later placed on a wanted list by the Russian occupiers for financing the Ukrainian Armed Forces, and a month later was detained and taken prisoner by them.

On the day news of his abduction broke, all businesses associated with the MP suspended operations. Viktor Dudukalov, a former member of the Berdyansk District Council, reported that, according to his information, Oleksandr Ponomarev “refused to cooperate with Russia and supported the Ukrainian military.”

Later, media outlets reported that Ponomarev himself had been taken to the Berdyansk intensive care unit in “stable but serious condition.” According to the MP’s own comments, he suffered a heart attack while under occupation. Some time later, he was able to travel abroad for treatment, thereby leaving Berdyansk and Russian territory via the temporarily occupied Crimea.

After the MP’s departure, the businesses associated with him were seized by Russian occupiers and local collaborators and re-registered under Russian law.

On November 13, 2022, Russian occupiers, specifically the LPR Prosecutor’s Office, announced that they had opened a case against a Berdyansk MP for supporting the Ukrainian Armed Forces, claiming that under the guise of supplying lubricants and fuel to Russian troops, the MP had obtained information on the location of Russian military units and passed it on to the Ukrainian Armed Forces.

On January 17, 2023, he returned to Ukraine via the border with Poland, and by January 19, he was seen at a session of the Verkhovna Rada.

Meanwhile, on July 24, 2023, Ponomarev received a notice from the SBU and the State Bureau of Investigations regarding suspicion of treason against Ukraine; he is suspected of re-registering enterprises under his control in the Zaporizhzhia region under Russian legislation and of these enterprises supplying fuel and lubricants to the Russian army. The politician was detained. Ponomarev rejected all charges: “To say that I am surprised or in shock is an understatement. The prosecution has not provided any evidence of my collaboration with the enemy. All the witnesses cited by the investigation unanimously state that they themselves saw nothing, heard nothing, and were not in those territories. Yet they claim to have heard something from their acquaintances. Moreover, upon my arrival in Ukraine, I answered all these questions at the SBU and took a lie detector test; no questions were raised against me,” Ponomarev stated after the verdict on his detention was announced.

More than 2.5 years after his arrest, not a single hearing has been held in the case, and the prosecution has yet to present evidence of a criminal offense. The politician remains in the Kyiv Detention Center (information current as of June 2026).

== Personal life ==
On June 29, 2018, Ponomaryov had a heart attack while he was in Berdyansk. He was hospitalized at the Zaporizhzhia Regional Cardiology Dispensary with a diagnosis of "acute heart attack"
