= Coat of arms of Berdiansk =

Symbol of Berdiansk, Ukraine

- Armiger: Berdiansk
- Adopted: 27 July 1999
- Use: Emblem of Berdiansk during the Soviet years

The Coat of Arms of Berdiansk is based on a similar version adopted in 1844. It features a shield per fess with azure and vert. In the upper part is an azure covered wagon and a sable plough which signify the half-nomad life of the Nagaysky settlers in the district. In the lower part is a sable anchor that symbolizes the port and the sea. The shield is crowned with an argent mauerkrone with three embattlements, on top of two or anchors connected by the gules ribbon".

The coat of arms of the Russian period was approved on November 17, 1844. In the upper part of the crossed shield in a green field is a silver Nogai kibitka and a black plow, which signify the semi-nomadic life of the Nogai settled in this district and the farming of other local inhabitants; in the lower part, in an azure field, is a black anchor, which shows the neighborhood of the district with the sea.
