= Berdiansk =

City in Zaporizhzhia Oblast, Ukraine

Berdiansk Бердянськ (Ukrainian) Бердянск (Russian) Berdyansk
- City
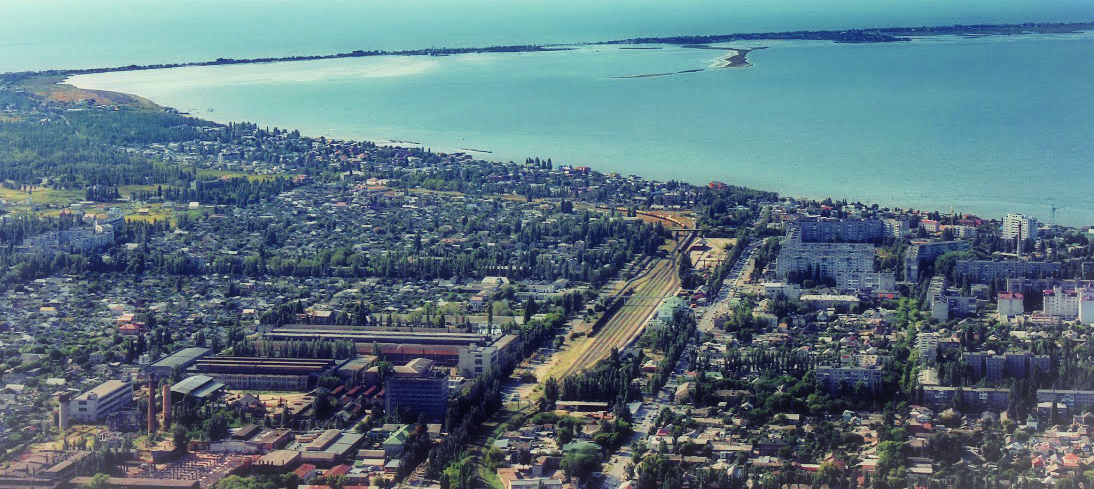
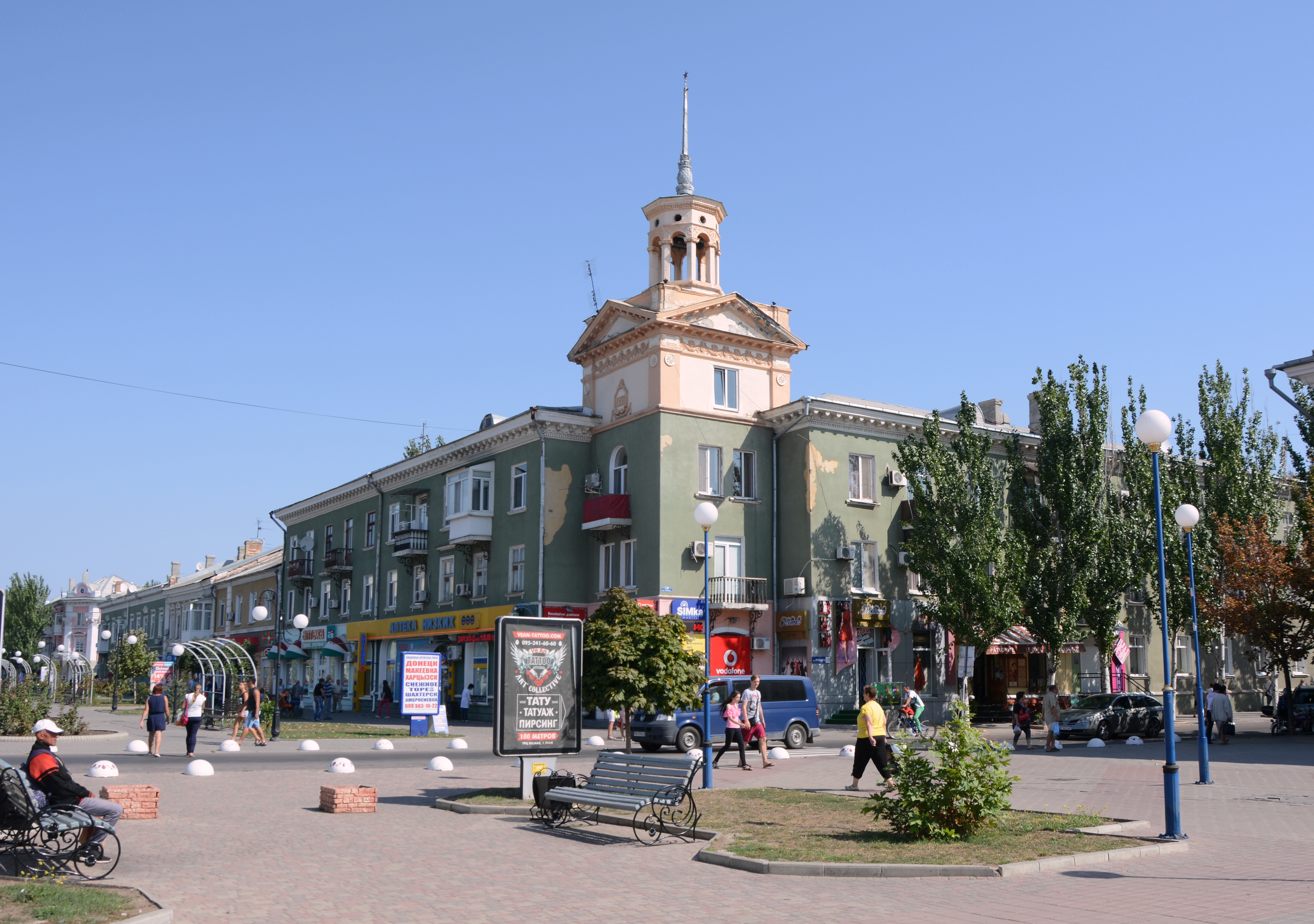
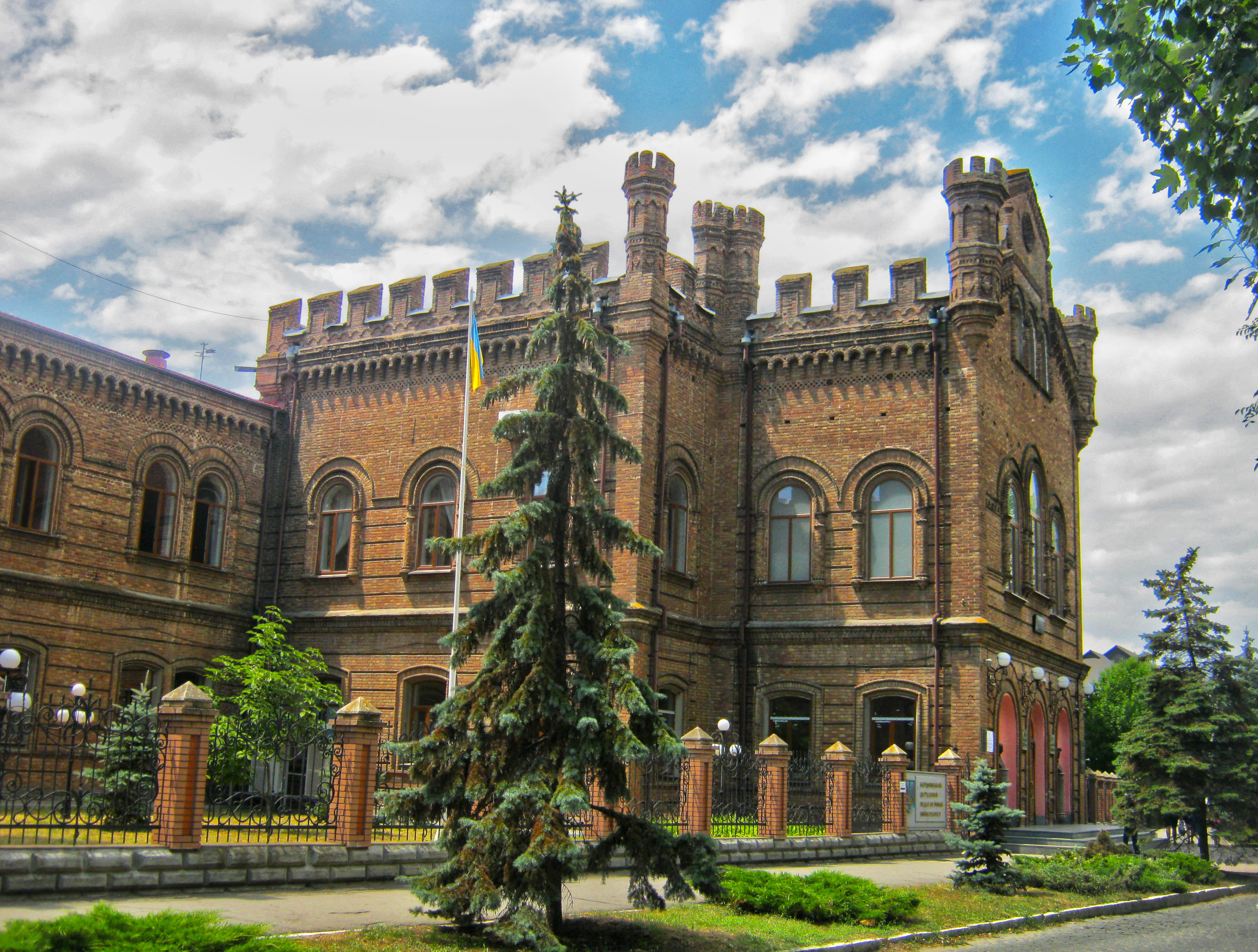
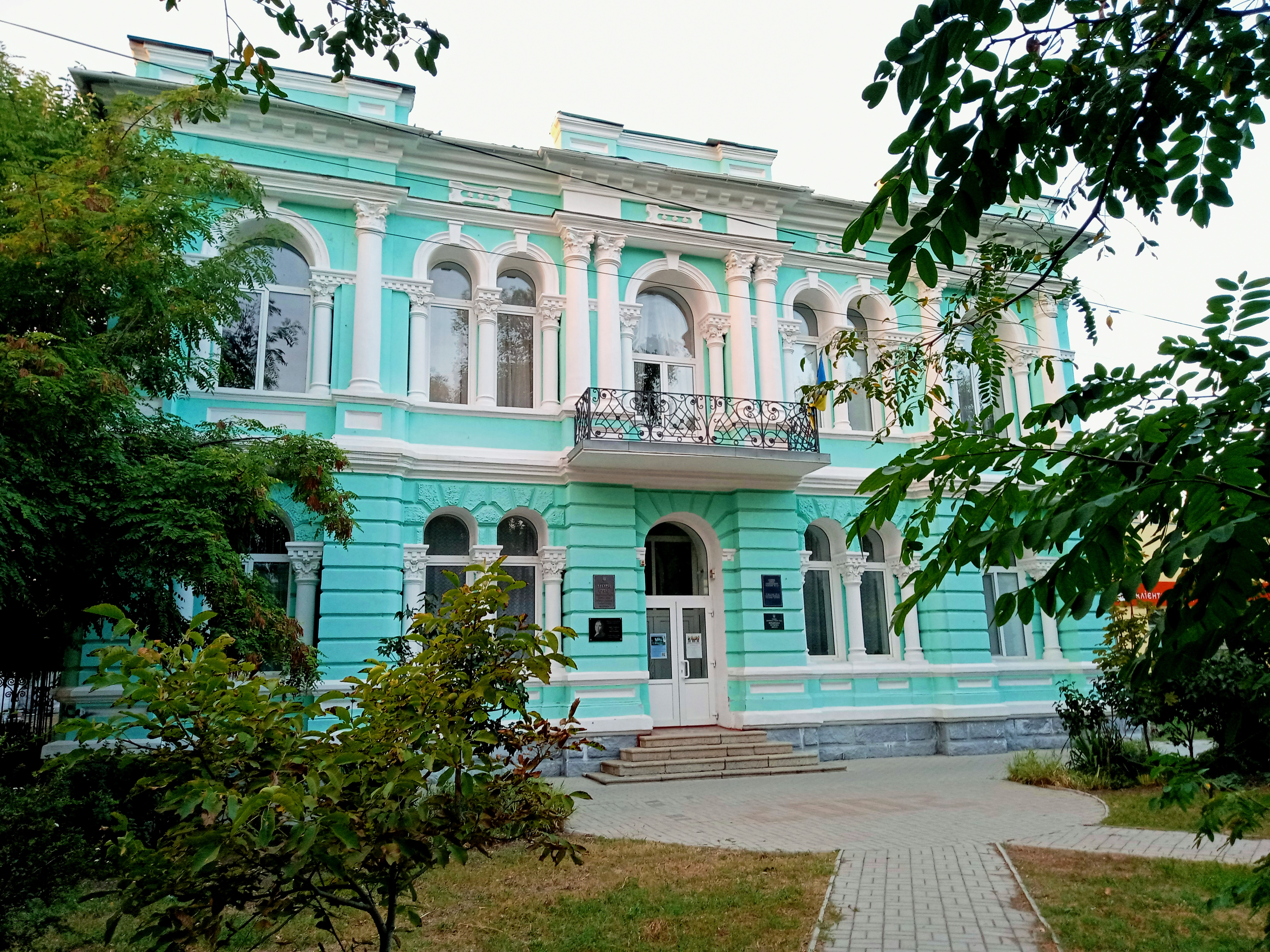
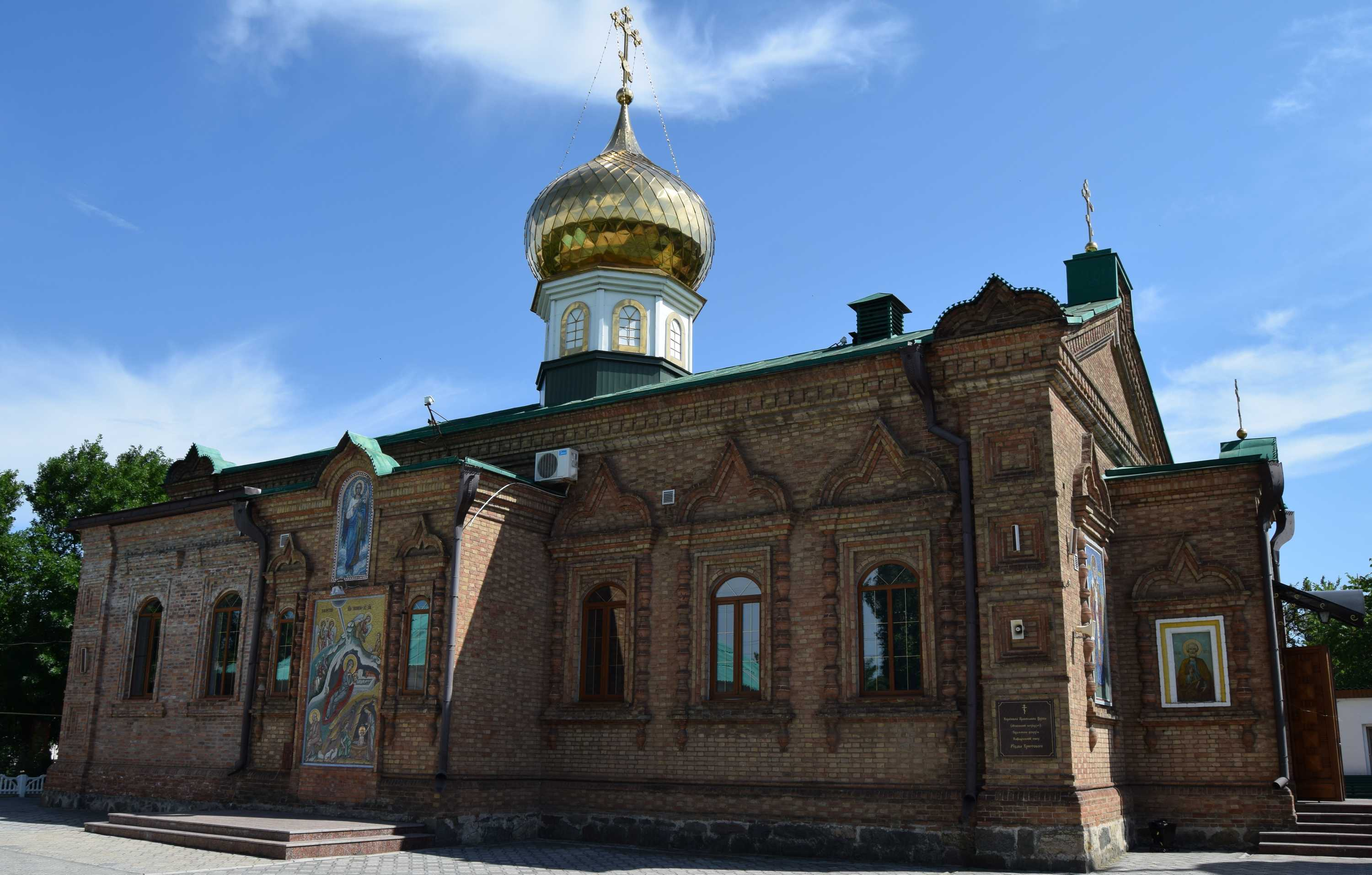
- Aerial view of Berdiansk Azovskyi Avenue Pedagogical University Music school Cathedral of the Nativity of Jesus

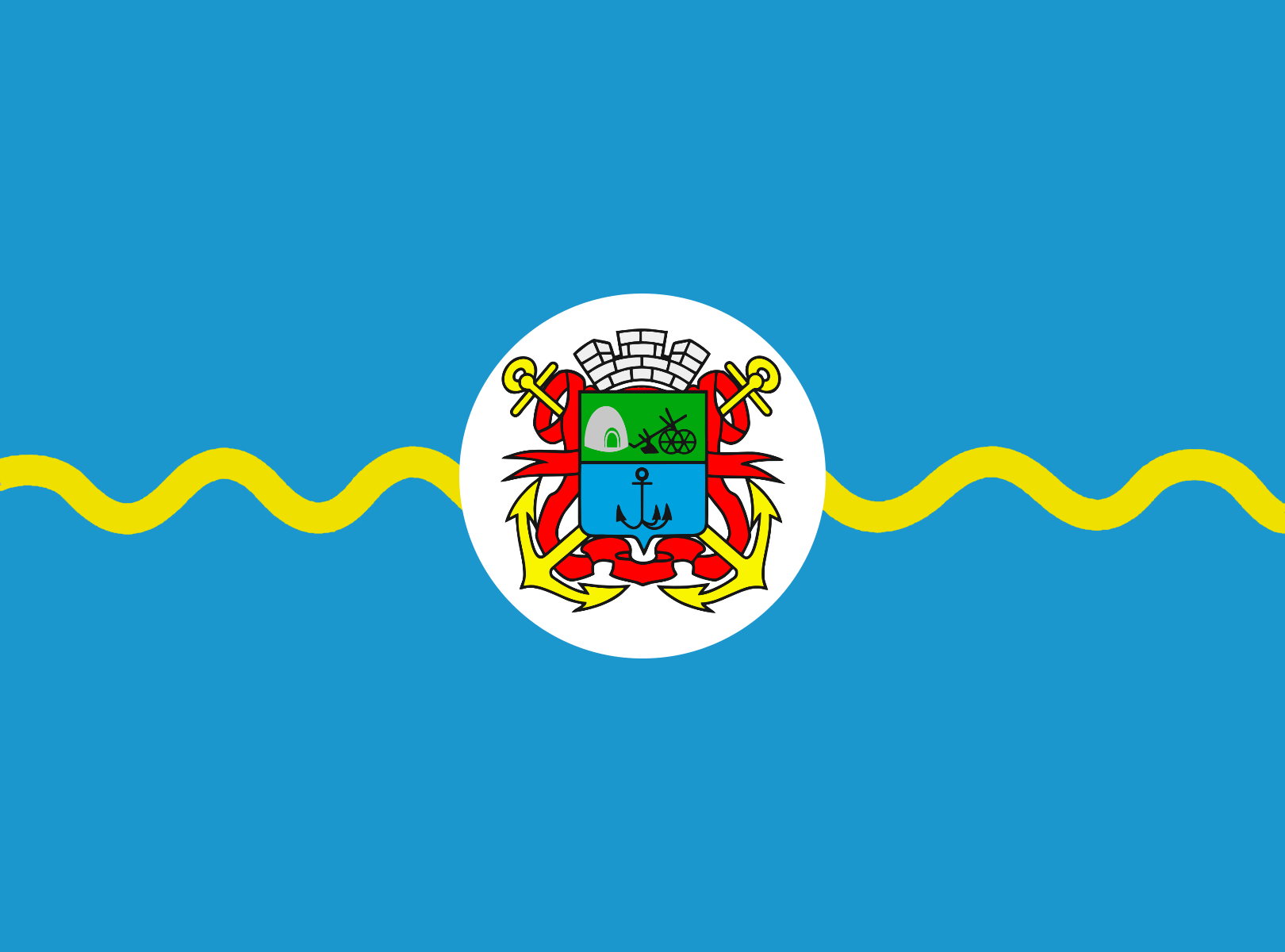
- Flag Coat of arms
- Interactive map of Berdiansk
- Location of Berdiansk Berdiansk (Ukraine)
- Coordinates: 46°45′20″N 36°47′20″E
- Country: Ukraine
- Oblast: Zaporizhzhia Oblast
- Raion: Berdiansk Raion
- Hromada: Berdiansk urban hromada
- Founded: 1673
- City rights: 1827

Government
  - Mayor: Oleksandr Svidlo (de-jure); Vasyl Nechet (de-facto)

Area
  - Total: 82.65 km^{2} (31.91 sq mi)
- Elevation: 10 m (33 ft)

Population (2022)
  - Total: 106,311
  - Density: 1,286/km^{2} (3,331/sq mi)
- Postal code: 71100-71127
- Area code: (+380) 6153
- Vehicle registration: AP/08
- Climate: Cfa
- Website: berdyansk-r23.gosweb.gosuslugi.ru

Berdiansk or Berdyansk (Ukrainian: Бердянськ, IPA: [berˈdʲɑnʲsʲk]; Russian: Бердянск, IPA: [bʲɪrˈdʲansk]) is a port city in Zaporizhzhia Oblast, south-eastern Ukraine and is currently occupied by Russia. It is on the northern coast of the Sea of Azov, which is connected to the Black Sea. It serves as the administrative center of Berdiansk Raion. The city is named after the Berda River's Berdiansk Spit, at the foot of which it is located. Its population is 106,311 (2022 estimate).

Berdiansk is home to a safari zoo, water park, museums, health resorts with mud baths and climatic treatments, and numerous water sport activities. Berdiansk Airport is located nearby.

Since 27 February 2022, Berdiansk has been under Russian occupation.

== History ==
=== Founding ===
In the 19th century, the Russian Imperial government began to plan to build a seaport in the Northern Azov region. In 1824, Count Mikhail Vorontsov, Governor-General of the Caucasus Viceroyalty, sent an expedition to the Azov Sea. Its task was to find a place to build a new seaport to assist in the defense of Russia's southern borders. Initially, the place for a future port was implied in the village of Obetochnoe that belonged to Count Orlov-Denisov, near the town of Nogaisk (now Prymorsk) founded in 1821.

In the autumn of 1824, Captain Nikolai Kritsky, the expedition supervisor reported on several prospective sites; the best being a place closed off from the sea by the Berdiansk Spit. In an official report to Vorontsov, Kritsky wrote: "the quality of Berdiansk Spit surpasses that of Obytichna Spit; you can build a landing stage and port on it unless you concede to Sevastopol...". In the 1820s, the place of the future Berdiansk was just a small settlement of fishers with a few huts.

The settlement that would become Berdiansk itself was founded in 1827 on the site of a Nogai settlement named "Kutur-Ohla". The settlement was also called "Kutur-Ohla" initially, inheriting the name of the Nogai settlement. Vorontsov, who had ordered the founding of the village, had a "fairly liberal" attitude regarding Jewish people, and so the settlement had a Jewish community from as early as it was founded. The local Jews were mainly employed as tailors and merchants.

=== Development ===
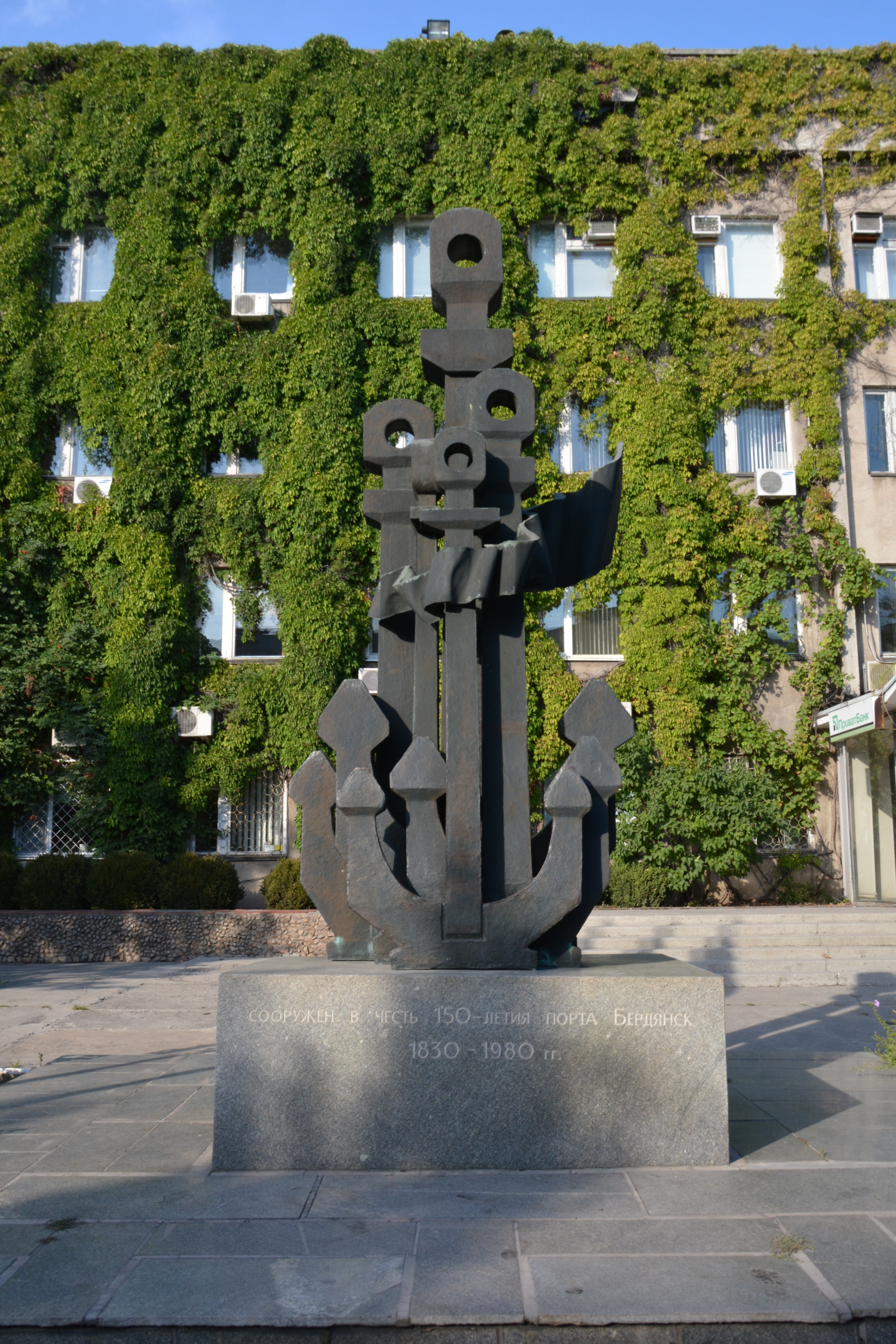
Monument to the 150th anniversary of the Port of Berdiansk

In 1830, its name was changed to Novo-Nogaisk. On 1 July 1830 merchant Nikolay Kobozev's private wooden quay was opened with a ceremony. Only by 12 January 1835, a state-owned quay had been built.

In 1833, Kobozev set up a wooden post to function as a navigation beacon. In 1836, the first foreign ship entered the port of Berdiansk. A modern stone lighthouse was built under the leadership of the Italian merchant Carlo Tomasini in 1838. It is a 23-metre (75 ft) octahedral whitestone tower with an orange stripe in the middle. The beacon fires protected sailing ships and was first seen in 1840. The present name "Berdiansk" was given to the city in 1841 by special decree of Nicholas I and named after the nearby Berda River. The name of Berdiansk has also been written Berdianske (Ukrainian: Бердянське), According to 1928 Kharkiv Orthography.

In 1841 the settlement at Berdiansk Bay received city status. Grigory Chernyaev (1787—1868) was appointed the city governor (gradonachalnik) and the head of Berdiansk sea port. Chernyaev, an officer from landed gentry, took part in the Battle of Borodino. After the defeat of Napoleon he was appointed a comendant of Valenciennes. Mikhail Vorontsov knew him from France, when the former was the commander of the Russian expedition forces.

The son of the Nogaisk merchant who owned fisheries at Berdiansk Bay, Nikolay Kobozev, was elected the first mayor of the city in 1841. During his term, the small township turned into a flourishing city with a large number of foreign companies' offices and active international trade. He built the first stone houses in the town and the famous Winter Theater, later destroyed during World War II.

In 1842, Berdiansk became the center of Berdyansky Uyezd (county). On 31 January 1845, the first coat of arms of Berdiansk was created. At the top, on a green background, is a silver Nogai nomadic tent together with a black plow; this denotes the semi-nomadic life lived in the Nogais and farming work done by local residents. In the bottom part, on a blue background, sits a black anchor to symbolize the district's affinity with the sea. By this time the customs outpost was already opened. Some foreign marine grain purchasing representatives (negotiators) moved their offices to Berdiansk from Mariupol and Odesa.

In 1847, Berdiansk's Jewish population was 572, and in 1860, they established a Talmud Torah school. In April 1862 Tsar Alexander II with assistance from Mayor N. Kobozev confirmed the city district plan for Berdiansk. In the plan, the streets were straight and led to the sea. This layout has remained to the present day in the central part of the city. It was forbidden to build houses above the second floor. Fine buildings decorate Berdiansk: the Winter Theatre, City Hall, the hotel "Bristol" (now House of Culture factory "Pivdenhidromash"), male classical school (now the main building of the Pedagogical Institute), Ascension Cathedral, the Lutheran Church, and more.

In Berdiansk the main employer was still the seaport, and on 24 March 1869 a breakwater was commissioned. This stone construction is 640 metres (2,100 feet) long with two port lights on the ends – pointers to the harbor, located at a distance of 859 metres (2,818 feet) from the shore. The increasing importance of the port was mentioned in 1867 in a commemorative book on the Taurida Governorate: "Already there is no doubt, that for all the Azov coast the Berdiansk port will be the Odesa of the Black Sea coast".

In 1876 as part of the defense of Sevastopol, rear admiral P. P. Schmidt was appointed Town Governor and Port Chief. Being a progressive man, he did much to promote the development of both port and city. Soon there were small industrial enterprises and banks opening in the city. John Greaves' factory manufacturing harvesters became well known across Europe. A farming machine factory was opened by Schröder and Matias. There was the rope-making factory of Venz and Yanzen, Selstrem's candle-wax works, Litsmen sausage factory, Fetter's brewery, Klavdin macaroni factory, and Ediger's printing house. The Italians constructed the city power station. By this time, two daily newspapers, three libraries and four bookshops were established. The city had running water and electric light illumination.

After the assassination of Alexander II in 1881, there were fears of antisemitic pogroms breaking out, and the Jews of Berdiansk requested the authorities to send troops to protect the population from ethnic violence.

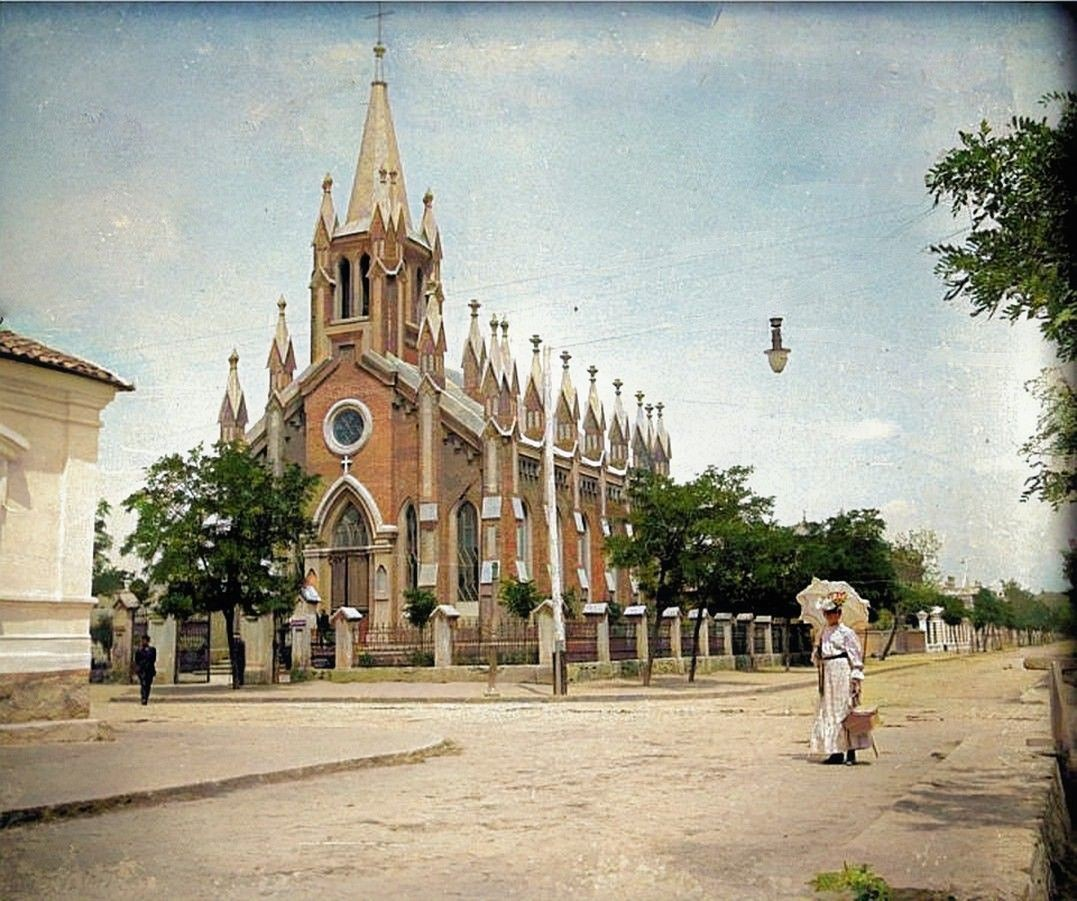
Lutheran church in 1903

In 1883, the oil lamps in the lighthouse were replaced by electric lights. The old beacon was refurbished and upgraded with newer equipment. According to the 1897 census, there were 3,306 Jews in Berdiansk, and they made up 12.9% of the city's total population. In 1899 Berdiansk was linked up to the railway.

At the beginning of the 20th century the city population numbered 26,500. There were about ten orthodox temples, two Jewish and one Karaite synagogue, boys and girls grammar schools, nautical classes, a city college and some credit institutions. In addition to an extensive export trade in mainly grain and flour, Berdiansk conducted large amounts of inland trade. It became a substantial distributive market for goods received over a wide area. By the beginnings of the 20th century, Berdiansk had become a merchant trading port with well developed industry, strongly influenced by its infrastructure. In 1915 a French consul, and the vice-consuls of the UK, Greece, Denmark, Spain, Italy, Sweden, and Norway, were in Berdiansk.

=== Soviet period and late 20th century ===
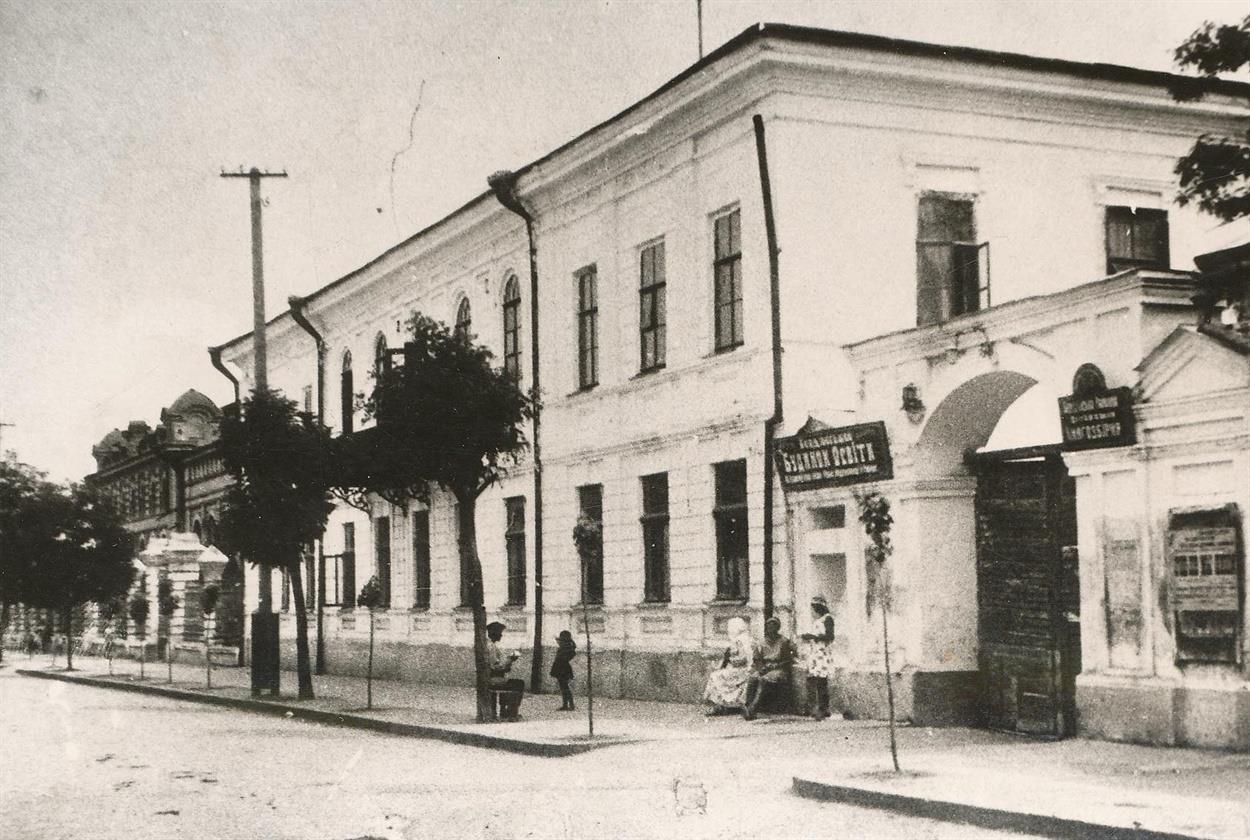
Berdiansk in the interbellum

During the Ukrainian War of Independence, Berdiansk fell under the control of the Makhnovshchina, becoming one of the key centres for the Ukrainian anarchist movement. Afterwards it was administratively part of the Zaporizhzhia Governorate of Ukraine.

During the Soviet period Berdiansk was a powerful industrial centre. There were machine factories of all types, an oil refinery, a fiberglass factory, cable factory, ferroconcrete combine, factory of materials handling equipment, provisions factory, a bread-baking complex, milk plant, a meat-packing plant, a considerable quantity of construction and mounting organizations, commodity railway station and the sea trading port. Between 1939 and 1958 the city was known as "Osypenko", so named after Hero of the Soviet Union Polina Osipenko.

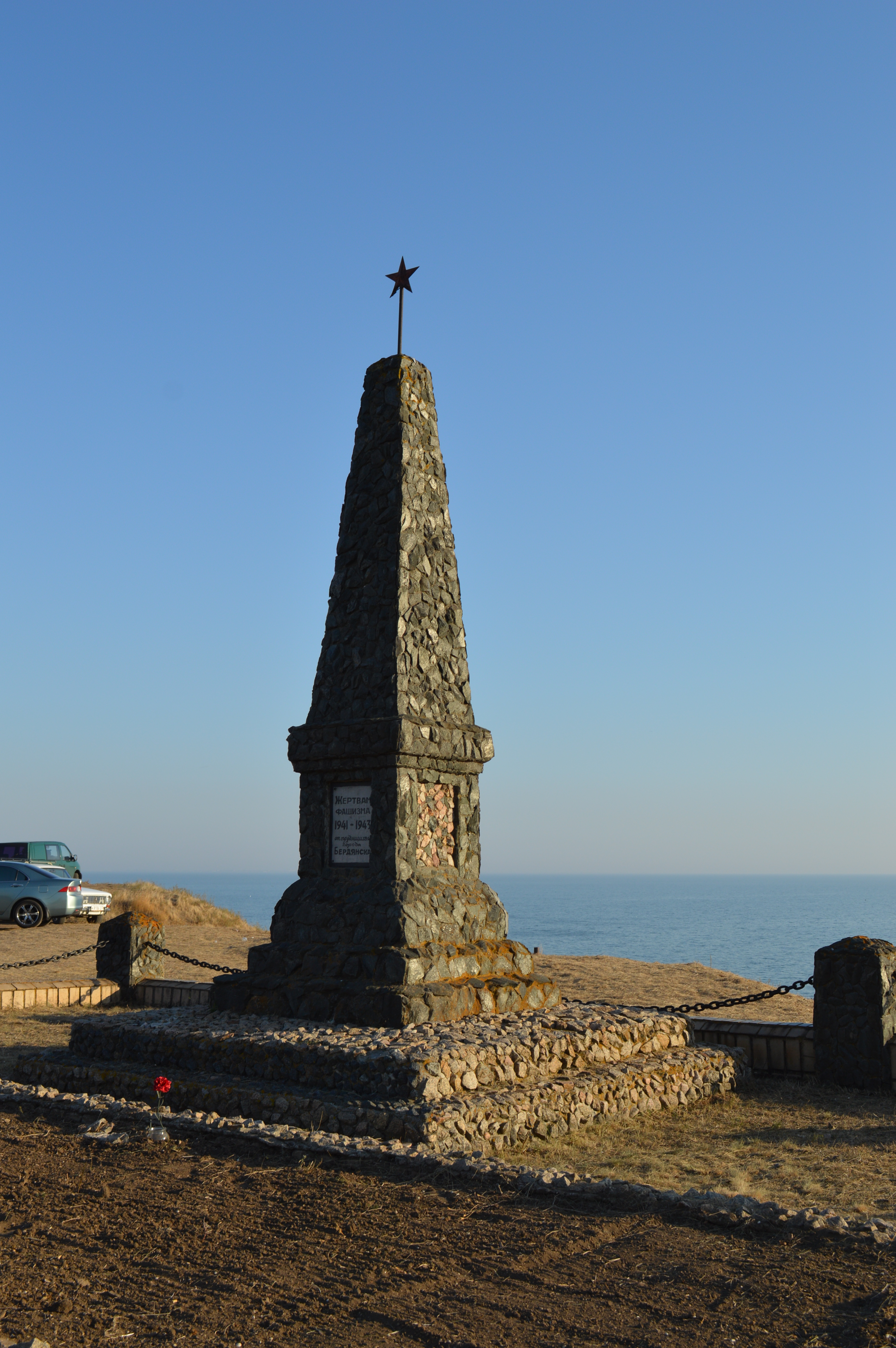
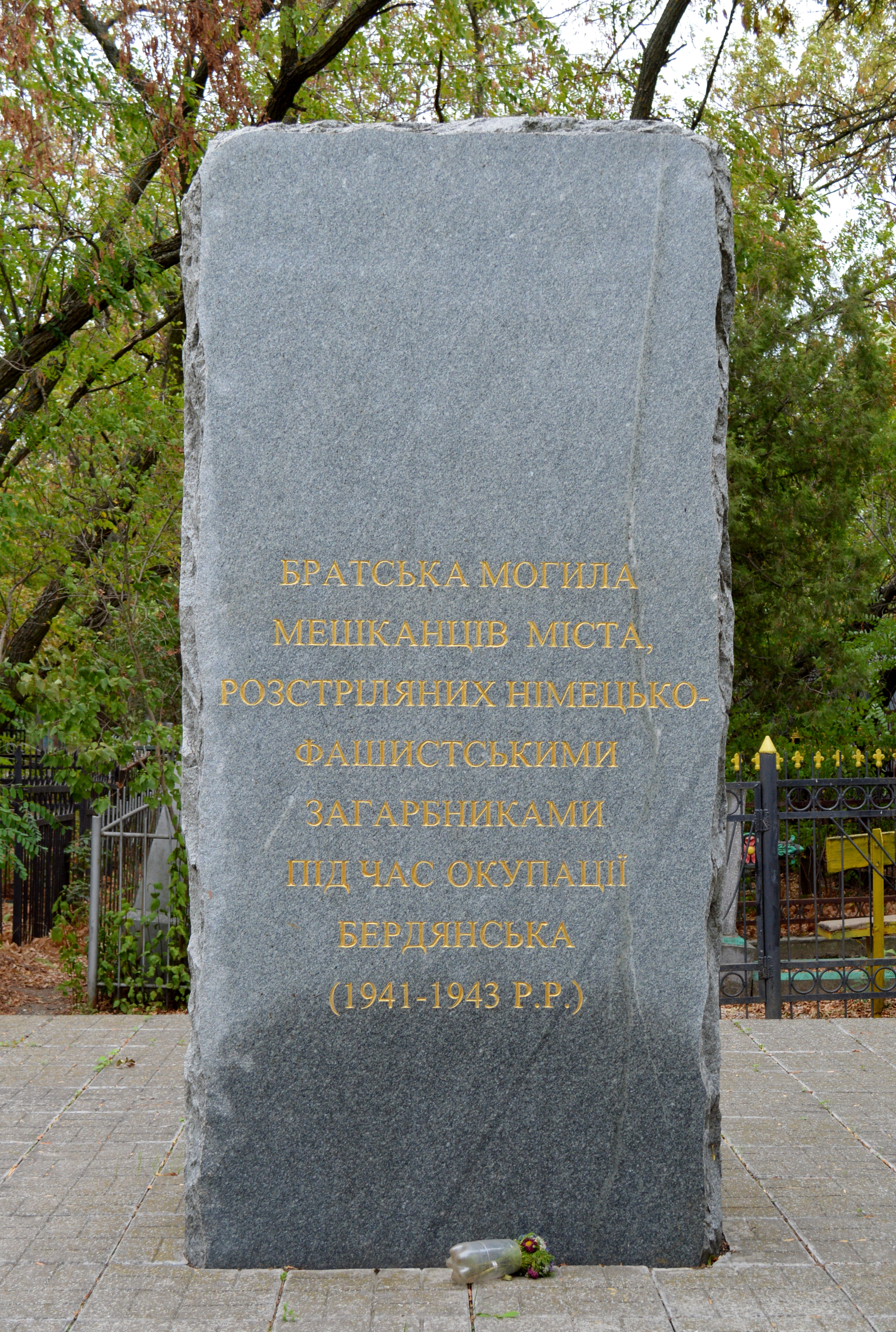
Mass graves of 915 victims of Nazi Germany

The Jews in Berdiansk were murdered during the German occupation of Ukraine in 1941 and 1942. During the rest of the Soviet period, little is known about the Jewish community. In the early 1990s, after Ukrainian independence, a Jewish cultural society in Berdiansk was created. In 1994, there were 2,000 Jews in Berdiansk, making up 1.3% of the population. The economy of Berdiansk declined due to the dissolution of the Soviet Union. The majority of the large industrial enterprises ceased operation or were reorganised into smaller private concerns.

=== Russo-Ukrainian War ===
Following the completion of the Crimea Bridge, and amidst hostile Ukrainian-Russian relations, the Ukrainian seaport authority stated in November 2018 that in Berdiansk year on year shipping had dropped 50%. They said that this was due to ships not getting permission from Russia to pass through the Kerch strait. Russia denied any disruption to Ukrainian shipping.

On 27 February 2022, three days after the Russian invasion of Ukraine began, Berdiansk was captured by the Russian Army during the Southern Ukraine offensive of the Russian invasion of Ukraine. Many local people protested the occupation in the streets, singing the Ukrainian national anthem. The Russian Navy Tapir-class landing ship Saratov was sunk in the port of Berdiansk by a Ukrainian attack on 24 March 2022. On 6 September 2022 Artem Bardin, the city's Russian-imposed commandant, was attacked and seriously injured near the administration building, and died later that day. A series of explosions was reported at Russian-occupied Berdiansk air base on 8 December 2022.

On 25 August 2025, Russian Prime minister Mikhail Mishustin signed in an order allowing the cities of Mariupol and Berdiansk to open their ports to foreign ships.

== Geography ==
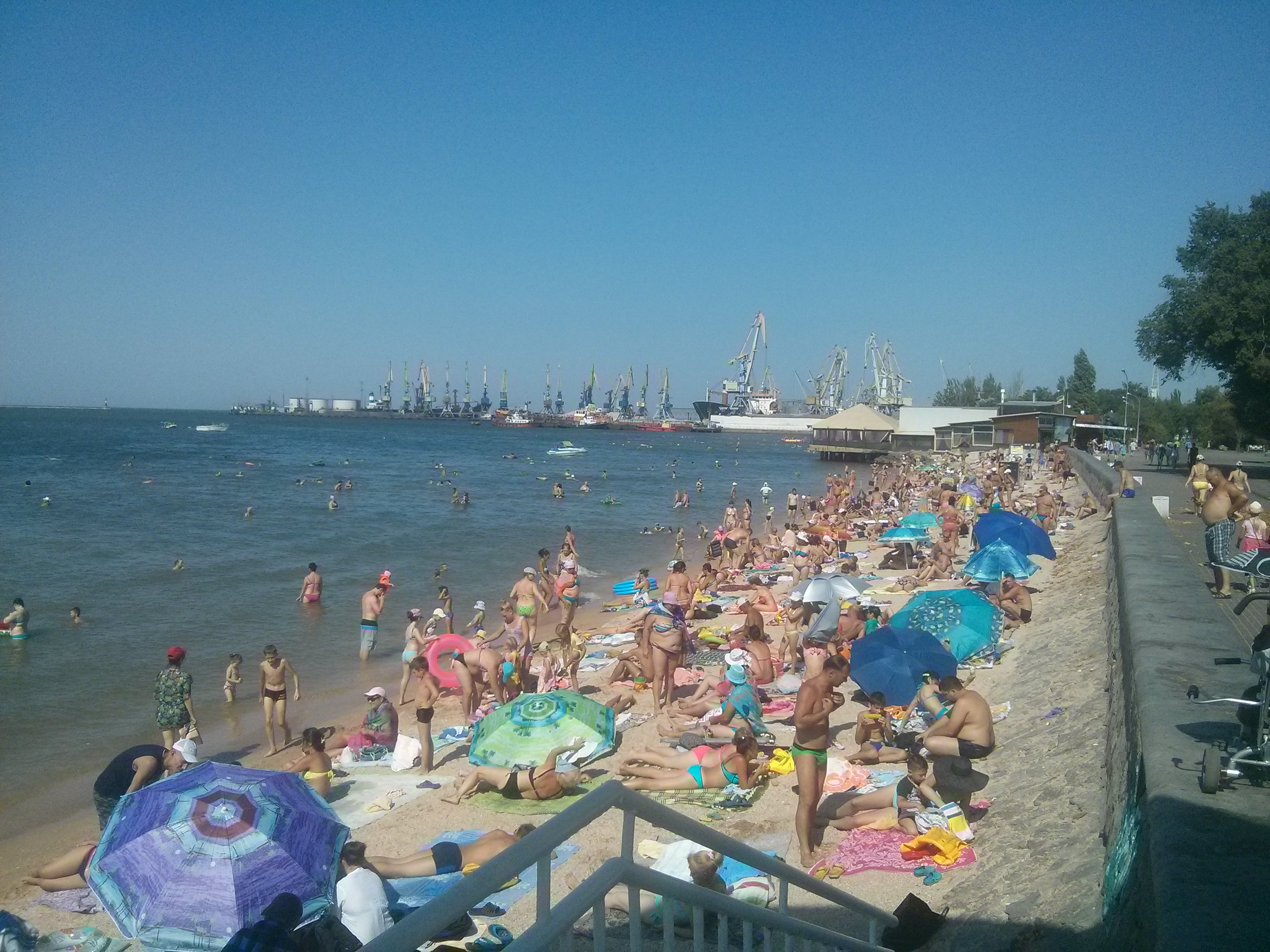
Beach on the Sea of Azov in Berdiansk

Berdiansk is located in a steppe zone that defines its varieties of flora and fauna. The climate on the Azov coast is unique: the summers are hot and dry, the winters are mild and warm. The main natural feature is the end of the Berdiansk Spit. The spit flora is quite diverse. Here one can find more than 300 different kinds of plants. Some of them are documented in the Red Book (e.g. Carex colchica, Eryngium maritimum, Glycyrrhiza glabra). The vegetation is mostly made up of plants with powerful root systems.

In spite of the fact that the spit is a populous territory, it exhibits a wide variety of fauna. Here it is possible to see hares, hedgehogs, martens, foxes, weasels and steppe cats. There also are: geese, sandpipers, swans, herons, ducks, magpies, seagulls, cormorants, warblers, lapwings, red-breasted geese and mute swans. Their numbers swell during the migration season. The islands of Big Dzendzik and Small Dzendzik, small islands in the Astapih's archipelago, contain most of the birds.

Sea water temperatures off Berdiansk are higher than the Black Sea coast of the Crimea and the Caucasus. Already in May, the water warms up to 22 °C (72 °F), and in June it can reach 30 °C (86 °F). In the sea there are more than 70 fish species amongst them great sturgeon, Russian sturgeon, starred sturgeon, Azov turbot, haarder, mullets, kilka, anchovy, sea roach, shemaya and various species of gobies. There are predators too, pike perch and sterlet. The phytoplankton consists of diatomaceous, peridinium and cyanobacteria algae. At the bottom of the sea are large quantity of molluscs, such as cockles, sendesmiya, mussels and myas. They form an important food source for the fish. In coastal waters there are also dolphins.

== Demographics ==
Historical population
Year	Pop.	±%
1860	10,100	—
1897	26,496	+162.3%
1926	26,409	−0.3%
1939	51,681	+95.7%
1959	65,249	+26.3%
1970	100,133	+53.5%
1979	122,109	+21.9%
1989	132,644	+8.6%
2001	121,692	−8.3%
2011	117,149	−3.7%
2022	106,311	−9.3%

Ethnic composition of the city according to the 2001 Ukrainian census:

Ethnic groups in Berdiansk
	percent
Ukrainians	56.82%
Russians	37.38%
Bulgarians	3.27%
Belarusians	0.80%
Armenians	0.20%
Tatars	0.16%
Jews	0.14%
Germans	0.10%

Native language according to the 2001 Ukrainian census:

Native languages in Berdiansk
Languages	percent
Russian	75.3%
Ukrainian	24.0%
Bulgarian	0.3%
Belarusian	0.1%
Armenian	0.1%

== Culture ==
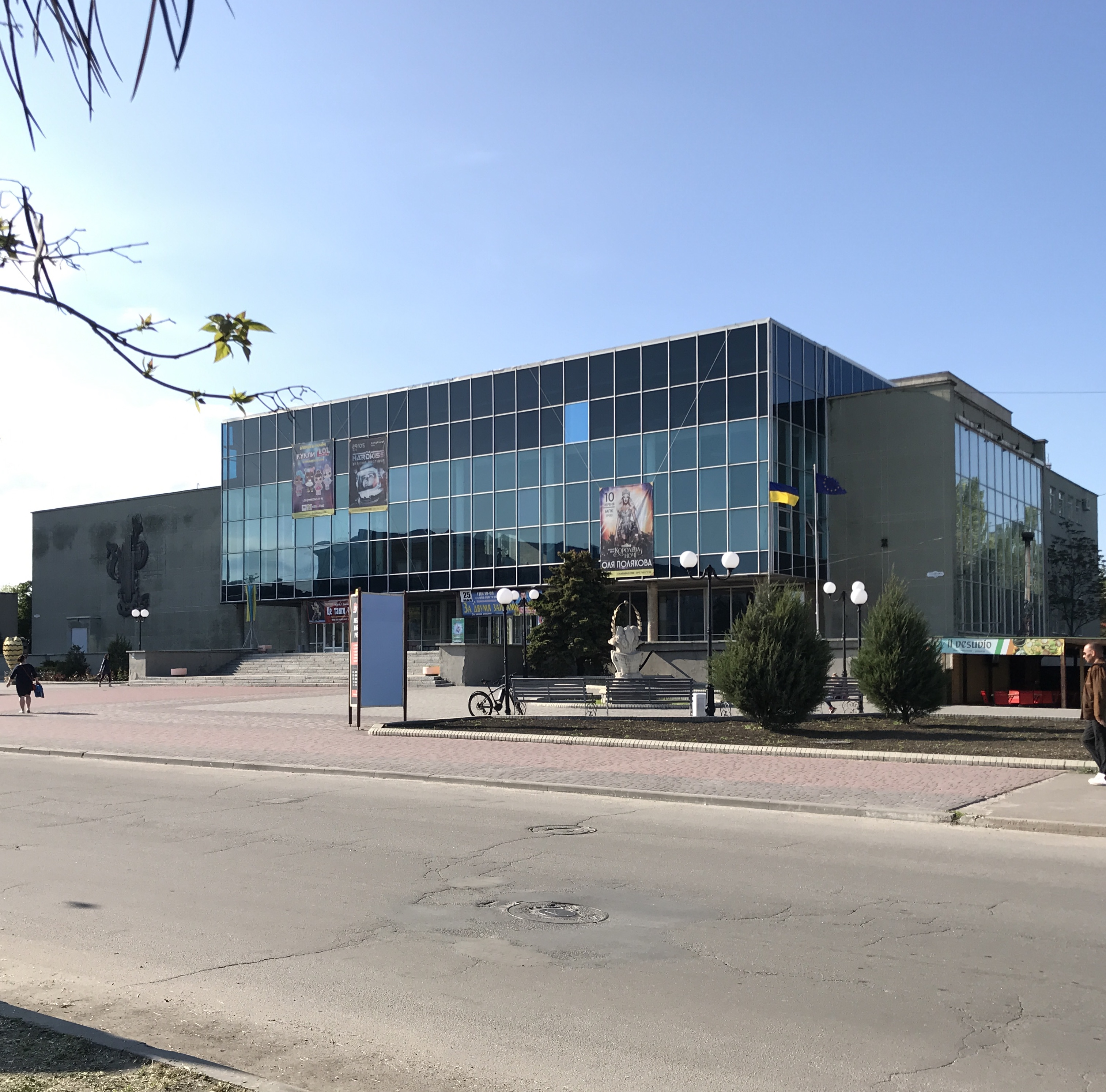
Berdiansk City Palace of Culture

In the city of Berdiansk, there are several art museums, Schmidt's Museum, Museum of World War II and Berdiansk History Museum. It is a host city to more than ten festivals a year. The list includes:

- the Azov Summer Ukrainian Journalism Festival
- the Brigantine Film Festival
- the Berdiansk Jazz Festival
- the Hilarious by the Dark Blue Sea Comedy Festival
- the Top-Top Children's Talent Festival
- the Starfall Children's Pop Music Festival
- Berdiansk Folk and Religious Music Festival
- the Heat of the Sun Festival
- the Azov Sails Televised Children's Talent Festival
- the Rock'n'roll Slavic Soul Festival,
- the Beer Festival

== Tourism ==
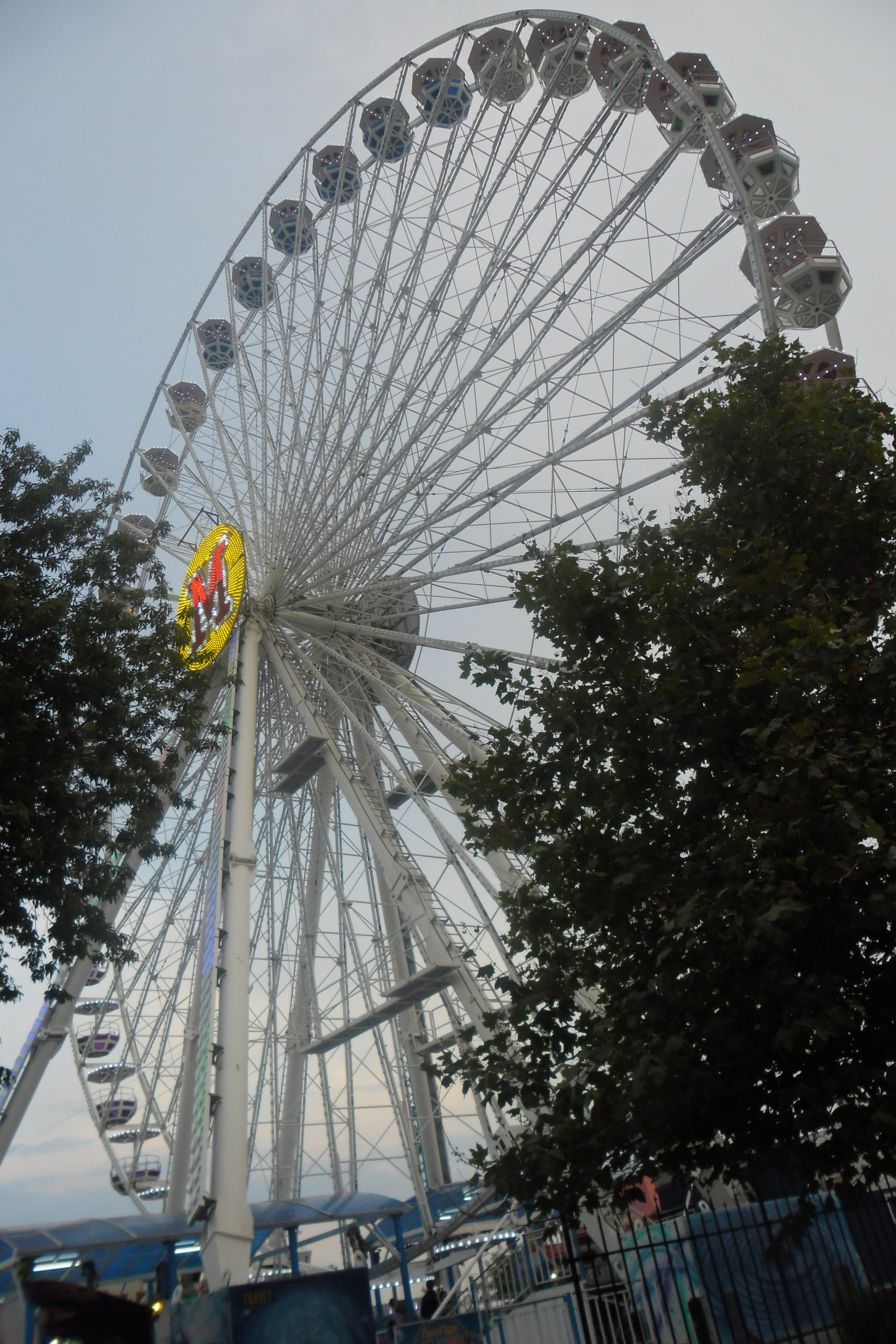
Berdiansk Ferris wheel

The status of the city has gradually changed from an Industrial centre to more of a tourist centre. Today Berdiansk is the main resort city on the Azov coast. Its population numbers about 130,000, and during the resort season this figure rises to about 600 thousand. The leisure facilities are highly developed and successfully compete with resorts on the Black Sea Coast and the Crimea. There are a large number of sanatoriums and resorts where it is possible to take medical and restorative courses for "health improvement".

On the Berdiansk Spit there are about: 7 sanatoriums, 17 children's and sports establishments, 45 recreation centres and boarding houses that receive up to 15 thousand visitors. There is also the biggest Aquapark in Europe, the Kyiv dolphinarium, a safari zoo, and a lot of pleasure and cultural establishments. Gradually Berdiansk is evolving into a modern European city. In 2001 it received first place in an All-Ukrainian competition for best city beautification.

In the pedestrian area of Azov Avenue, the Seaside square and Berdiansk quays it is possible to travel on trishaws, a small steam locomotive and on real horses. On all beaches there are entertainments such as: riding on rubber bananas and tablets, water bicycles and motorcycles, slides and trampolines, and sailing. There is also nightlife, with many bars and restaurants located directly on the sea coast.

== Economy ==
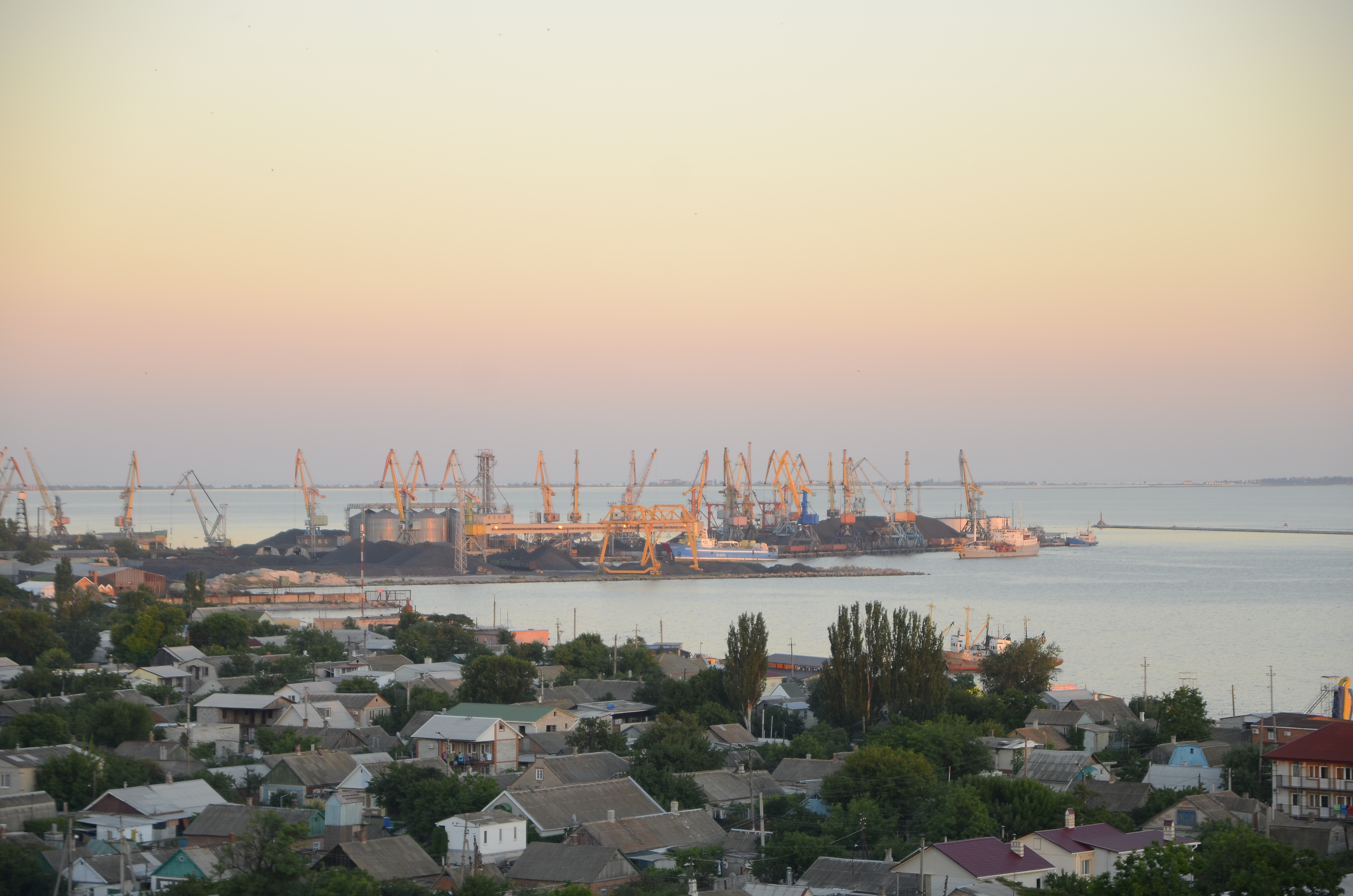
Berdiansk port

One of the main enterprises is the sea trading port, with clients from all over the world. It carries out metal processing, scrap metal, grain, coal, ore, clay, sunflower-seed oil, industrial oils, mineral oil, and pig-iron. There is a complex for processing fertilizers and mineral oil, the container terminal, and a railway depot. Tracks and roads approach all moorings, and all are equipped with electric cranes. Depth in port water area is 8.4 metres (28 feet).

Berdiansk is also an important fisheries centre which is an integral part of the city's food industry. There is also a scientific organisation which does fish research in reservoirs of the Azov basin. It determines stock levels and calculates the annual volumes of withdrawal of such valuable food fish as sturgeon, pike perch, haarder, Azov turbot, Azov gobies, and flounder.

Chemical and the petroleum-refining industry is represented by two big enterprises: "AZMOL," and the Berdiansk state fiberglass factory, plus two small enterprises: Limited Liability Company "Fibreglass" and Closed Corporation "Bertie." Public corporation "AZMOL" is engaged in the manufacture of lubricants and packaging, and the development of new products using energy-efficient technologies. Transfer to municipal ownership of the city biological sewage treatment plant is planned.

== Education ==
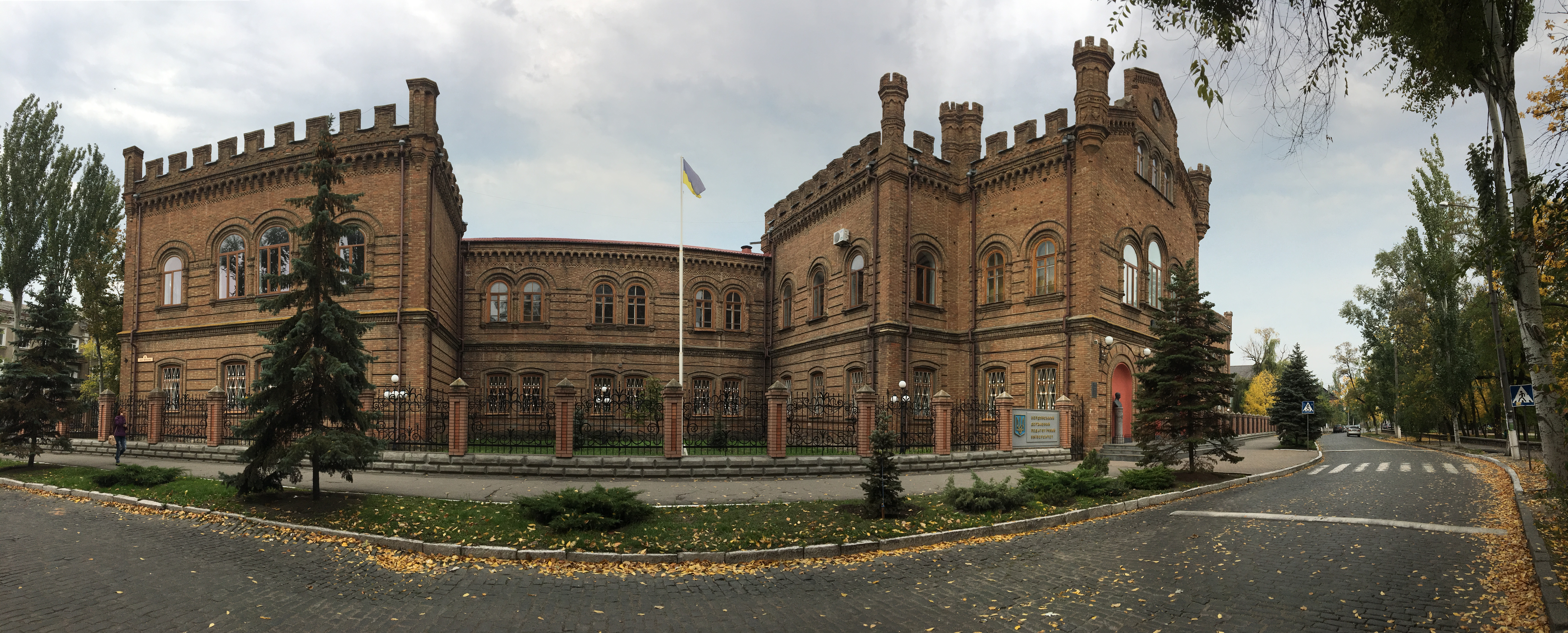
Berdiansk State Pedagogical University, Main Building

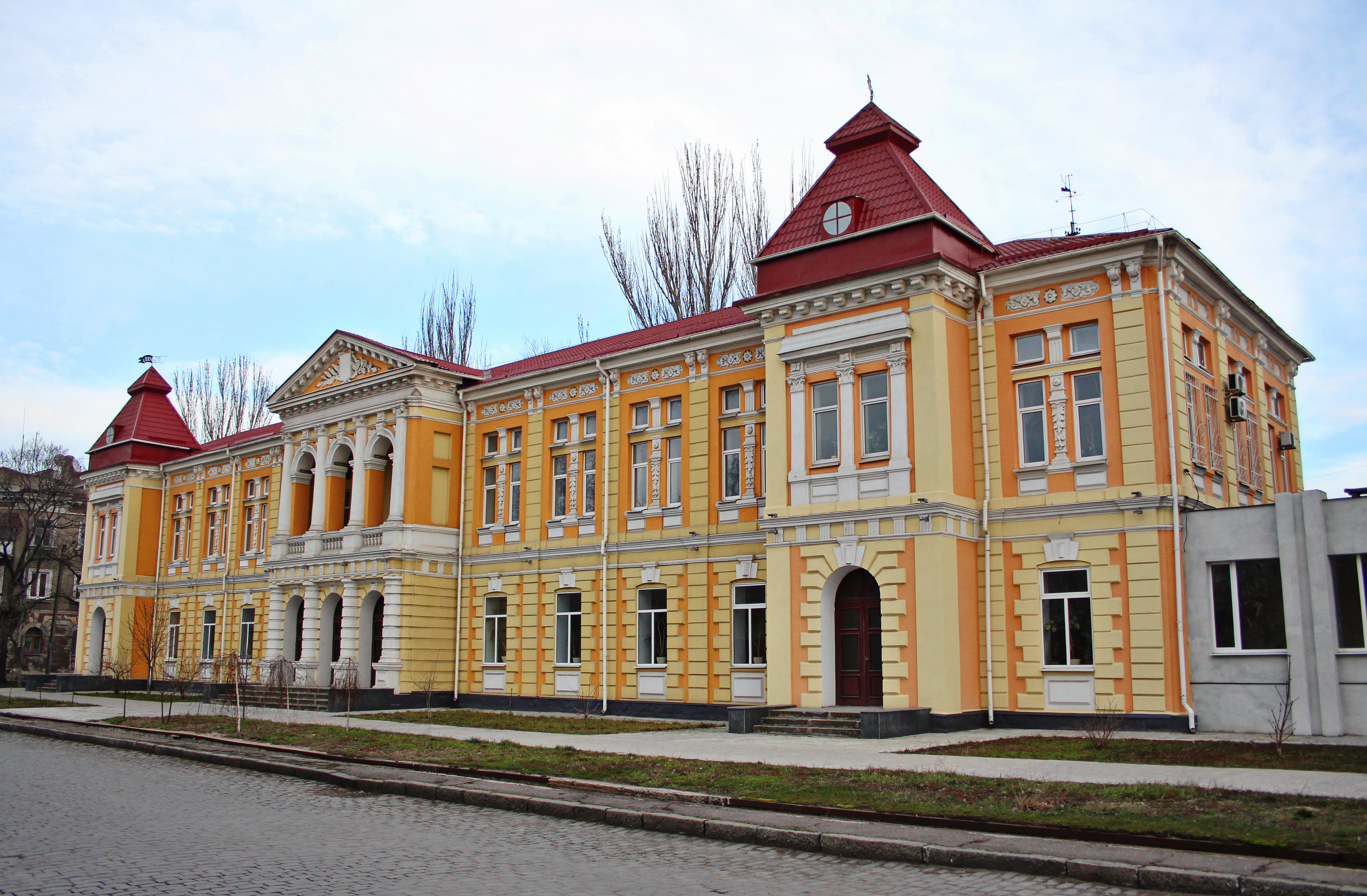
Berdiansk State Pedagogical University, Building No. 5

As well as the state comprehensive schools there are private lyceums and gymnasiums, as well as branches of other high schools and professional colleges. There is the Berdiansk State Pedagogical University and the University of Management and Business. In the Schmidt park there is the Berdiansk musical school, and nearby, almost on the coast, an art school. A subject of pride in Berdiansk is the Centre of Children's and Youthful Creativity, numbering a large quantity of study groups and ensembles.

According to Ben Eklof in Russian Peasant Schools, education in Berdiansk was badly disrupted in the 1870s when the schools director, a government inspector, 'ran amok' and had to be removed from his post.

== Notable people ==
- Peter Jansen (1852–1923), born in Berdiansk, rancher and founder of Jansen, Nebraska, State Representative and Senator
- Opanas Slastion (1855–1933), painter
- Waldemar Haffkine (1860–1930), bacteriologist
- Joel Engel (1868—1927), music critic and composer
- Sergei Spytetsky (1877—1963) Orthodox (and later Greek-Catholic) priest
- Isaak Brodsky (1883–1939), Soviet-Jewish painter
- Polina Osipenko (1907–1939), Soviet military pilot, was born in the nearby village of Osypenko
- Lidiya Chernysheva (1912–1875), ballet dancer
- Mikhail Voskresensky (born 1935), Russian pianist
- Rustam Akhmetov (born 1950), retired high jumper who represented the Soviet Union
- Tatyana Prorochenko (1952–2020), athlete, Olympic champion (in 1976 and 1980)
- Tatyana Nazarova (born 1960), theater actress
- Oleksii Kaida (born 1971), Ukrainian politician (Svoboda) and former People's Deputy of Ukraine
- Hennadiy Lahuta (1974-2023), Ukrainian politician and Governor of Kherson Oblast
- Olga Kurylenko (born 1979), model and actor
- Vitaly Papazov (born 1980), a champion (in 2002) and the world record-holder in powerlifting
- Yehor Cherniev (born 1985), politician
- Yevhen Chepurnenko (born 1989), football player
- Vladyslav Buialskyi (born 1997), opera singer

== International relations ==
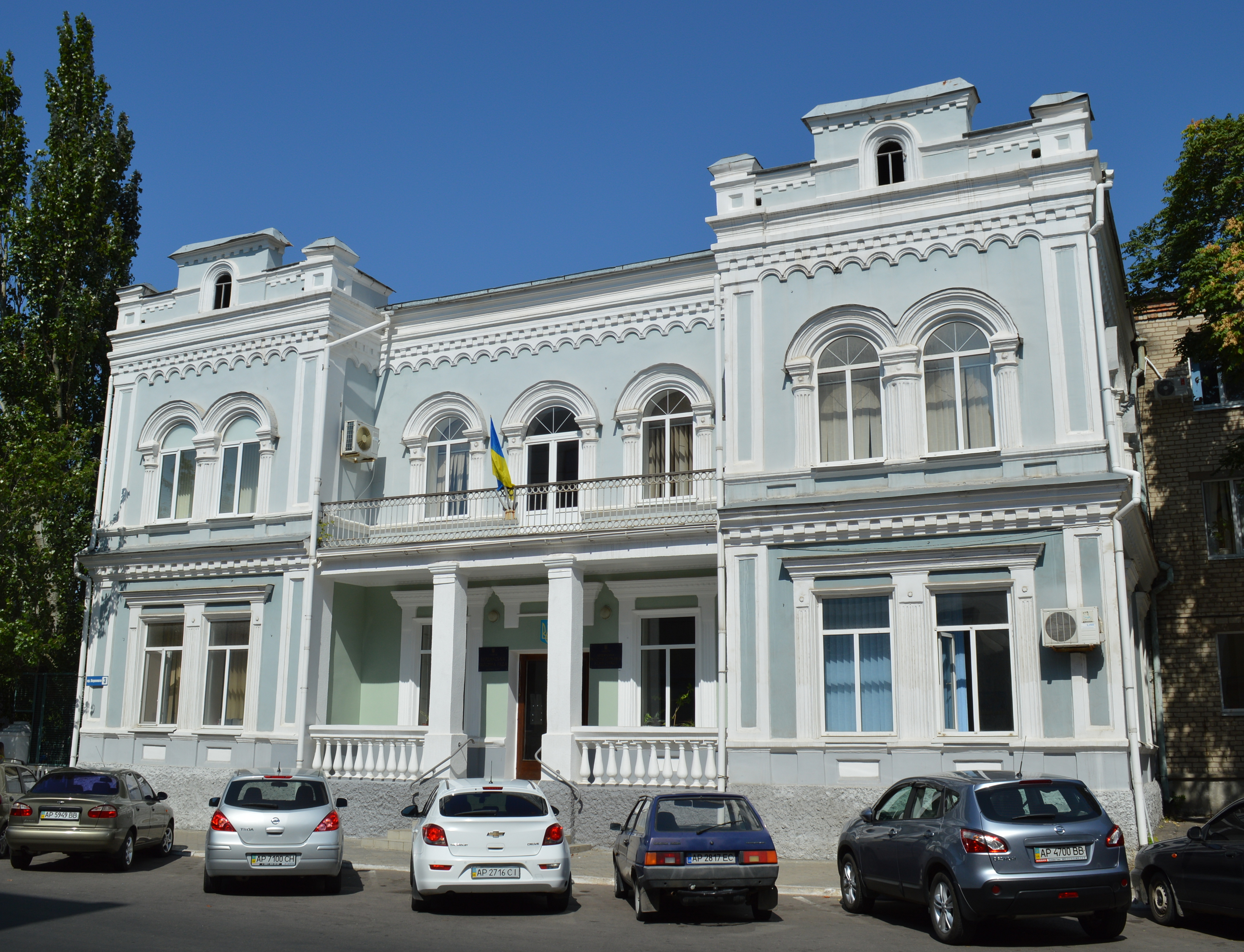
Berdiansk Raion Council

Berdiansk is twinned with:

- Beibei (Chongqing), China
- Bielsko-Biała, Poland
- Glyfada, Greece
- Haisyn, Ukraine
- Horodenka, Ukraine
- Khmilnyk, Ukraine
- Kremenchuk, Ukraine
- Lowell, United States
- (Georgia (country)) Poti, Georgia
- La Seyne-sur-Mer, France
- Yambol, Bulgaria
