= Sergei Spytetsky =

- Born: July 12, 1877
- Died: August 28, 1963 (aged 86)
- Other names: Father Sergei Spytetsky
- Occupation: Priest

Father Sergei Spytetsky (Polish: Sergiusz Spytecki) (12 July 1877 – 28 August 1963) was an Orthodox (and later Greek-Catholic) priest.

== Biography ==
Sergei Spytetsky was born on July 12, 1877, in Berdyansk, Zaporizhia Oblast, now Ukraine. In 1904, he was ordained as a priest in the Russian Orthodox Church, and also served as a priest in the Orthodox Diocese of Pinsk. In March 1924, Spytetsky converted to the Catholic Church under the tutorship of Henryk Przeździecki, who was then Bishop of the Roman Catholic Diocese of Siedlce.

Spytetsky later served in various parishes located in: Old Pavlov, Bubel, Jani-Podlaskie, Dokudovo and Terespol. In 1937, he organized an Uniate parish in Biala Podlaska. On December 22, 1939, he retired and settled in Siedlce, Poland. He died in Siedlce on August 28, 1963.

== Sources ==
Author: Fr. Zbigniew Nikoniuk, "Kostomłoty way to unity", page 65
