= Obytichna Spit =

Spit in the Sea of Azov

Obytichna Spit Обитічна коса (Ukrainian)
- Spit
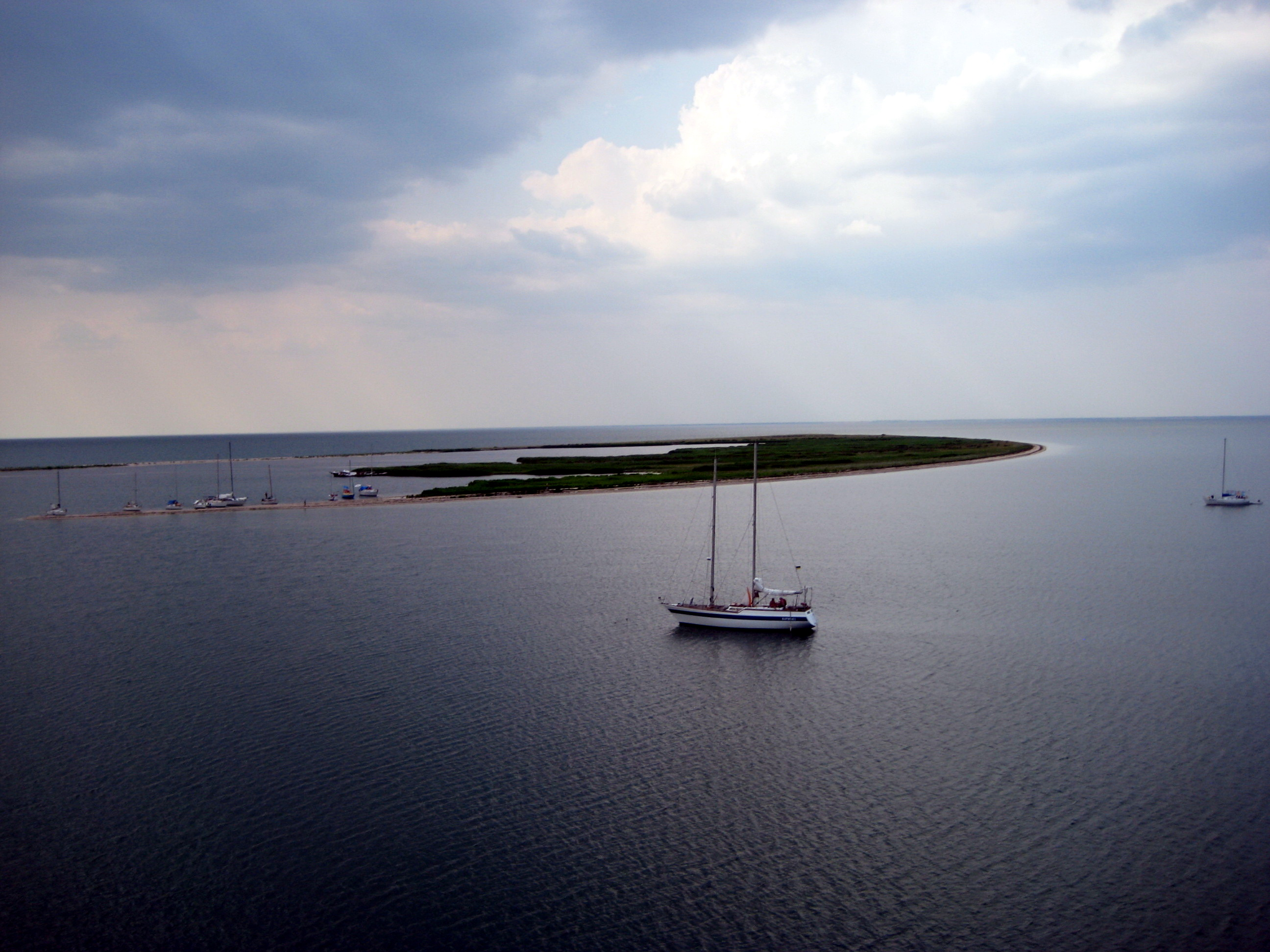
- The spit seen from the northwestern extremity.

- Interactive map of Obytichna Spit
- Coordinates: 46°31′56.64″N 36°12′18.36″E
- Location: Berdiansk Raion, Zaporizhzhia Oblast, Ukraine
- Highest elevation: 2.2 m

Obytichna Spit (Ukrainian: Обитічна коса) is a spit located on the northern shore of the Sea of Azov. Administratively, it belongs to Berdiansk Raion, Zaporizhzhia Oblast, Ukraine. It borders the Obytichna Bay to the east, and is opposite to the mouth of the Obytichna River. It is also a reserve of national importance due to its biodiversity, including its fauna and fish. It is identified as one of the Key Botanical Territories (KBTs) of the Northern Pryazovia area due to its habitats and presence of large populations of endangered species.

== Spit ==
The spit is located 10 km south-west of the city of Prymorsk.

The spit is 30 km long and is located 1.5-2 m above sea level. There are small salt lakes in the center and steppe vegetation. The vegetation is halohytic and psammophytic, meaning they are salt-tolerant and sand-adapted vegetation, which is unique for the spits. The halohytic vegetation has significantly declined from 22% in 1934 to 10% in 1996, waterlogged areas and internal water bodies have expanded, and marsh vegetation has slightly declined, unlike other spits which have seen an expansion. It also includes floodplain meadows and sandy coastal habitats, which are rare in the area. The marine soils are silt-shelly, sometimes sandy.

The climate of the site is humid continental, with severe winters, no dry season, and hot summers. The highest amount of precipitation is observed in the summer months, and when snow and ice happens, they are both unstable.

== History ==
The spit was first protected in 1927 as part of the "Seaside Reserves along the Black and Azov Sea", and in 1937 was incorporated into the Azov-Sivash State Reserve. In the immediate aftermath until 1954 it was a local reserve, but during the 1960s-70s its land was used for collective farms for agriculture. This was reversed in 1974 when it gained back its protected status, and in 1980 it was created a national landscape reserve with a total area of 8,863 hectares (6,653 ha of which was water area, 2,210 ha of which was land). The reserve was divided into three zones: there was a mainland slope and spit with controlled recreation, there was an area of 1,543 ha within the spit for a strict protection zone, and 365 ha of which was the southern part, which allowed limited economic activity.

However, by the end of the 20th century and starting into the 21st century, the northern coast of the Sea of Azov suffered from human pressure. This pressure was tied to the agrarian infrastructure and large hydro-engineering projects that were present in the area. It was difficult to protect them due to integrated management being required for both the sea and river basins. In an attempt to help this, the Ramsar Convention designated, in 1997, the spit as being of importance. In 2018, the boundaries of the site were delineated, which was officially approved by the government in 2021 based on the Land Cadastral Map of Ukraine.

== Biodiversity ==
Some of the species which are included in the Red Book of Ukraine in the spit include the Silene borysthenica, Allium savranicum, Bellevalia sarmatica, Centaurea iljinii, Salicornia prostrata, and Trifolium rubens. Previously, the spit hosted 1% of Europe's breeding Great Egret and up to 50% of Europe's wintering Greater Scaup. However, the expansion of the Great Cormorant displaced many of the waterbirds, dropping species diversity from 8-11 species to only 3, with only the Caspian Gull breeding alongside the cormorants. The site also used to support a large number of fish species, like the Acipenser stellatus and Umbrina cirrosa, while there are still some of the former, none of the latter have been found. In more recent years, since 2015-18, freshwater forms of fish have also been at decline due to an increase of salinity in the Sea of Azov.

There is also a large population of magpies in the area during the summer, which are important as, although they rarely reuse their roofed nests, later birds typically occupy them for breeding, especially raptors and owls. They are located in the coastal shelterbelts of the spit where elaeagnus and tamarix are.

== Gallery ==
Fauna and biodiversity of the spit
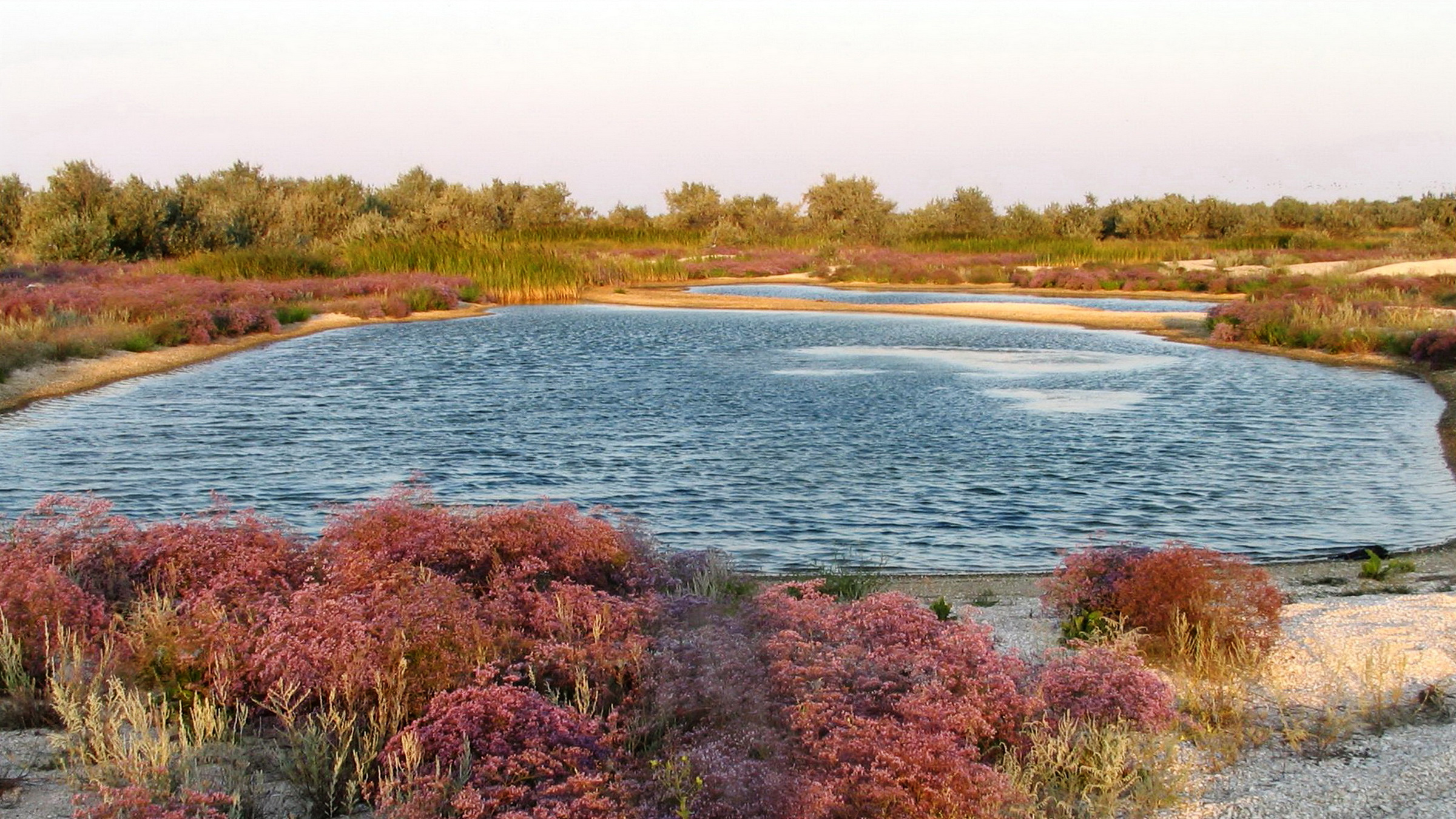
An example of the salt lakes near the center of the spit.

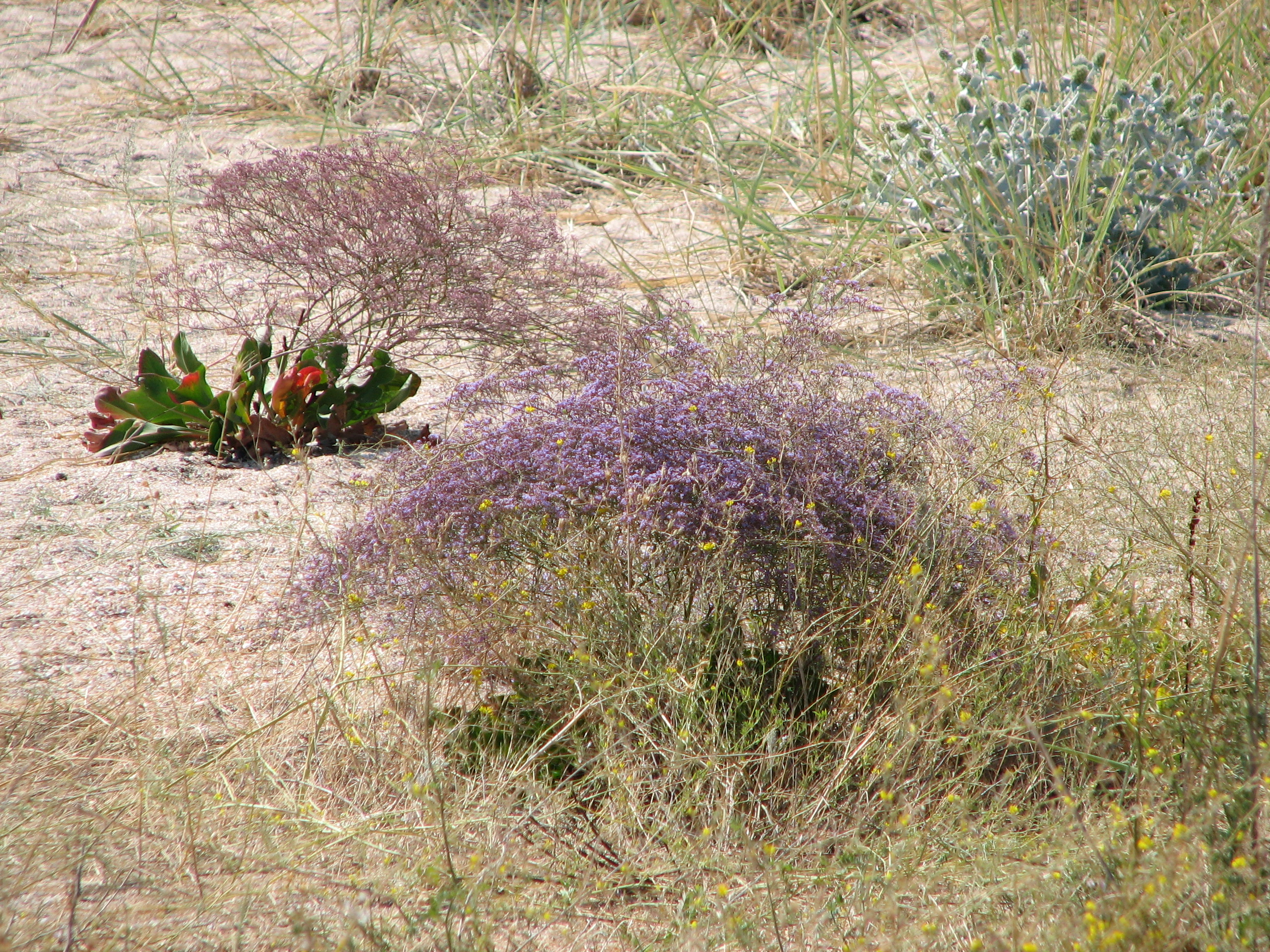
Some of the pioneer halophytic vegetation.

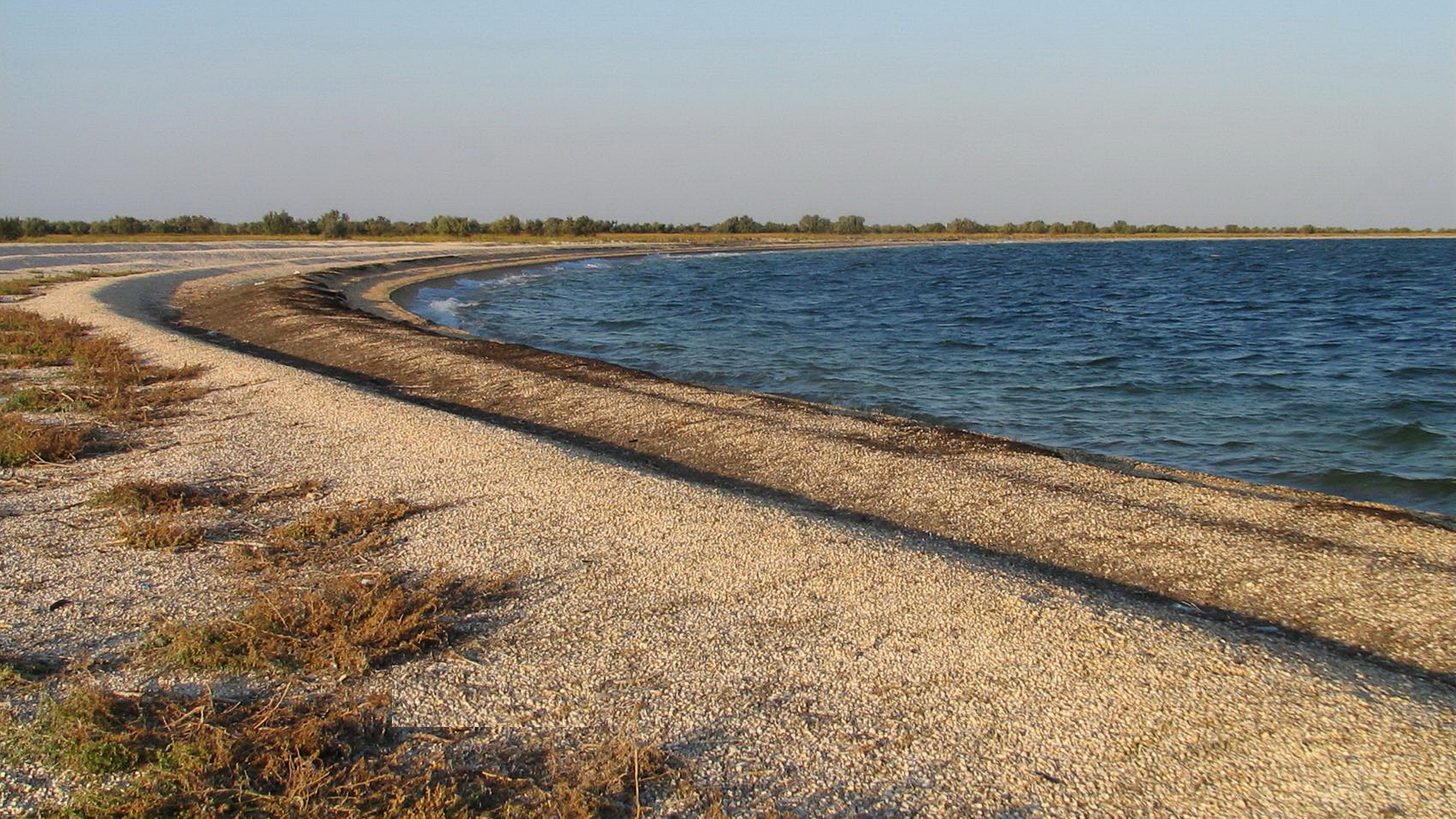
Sand-shell ridges

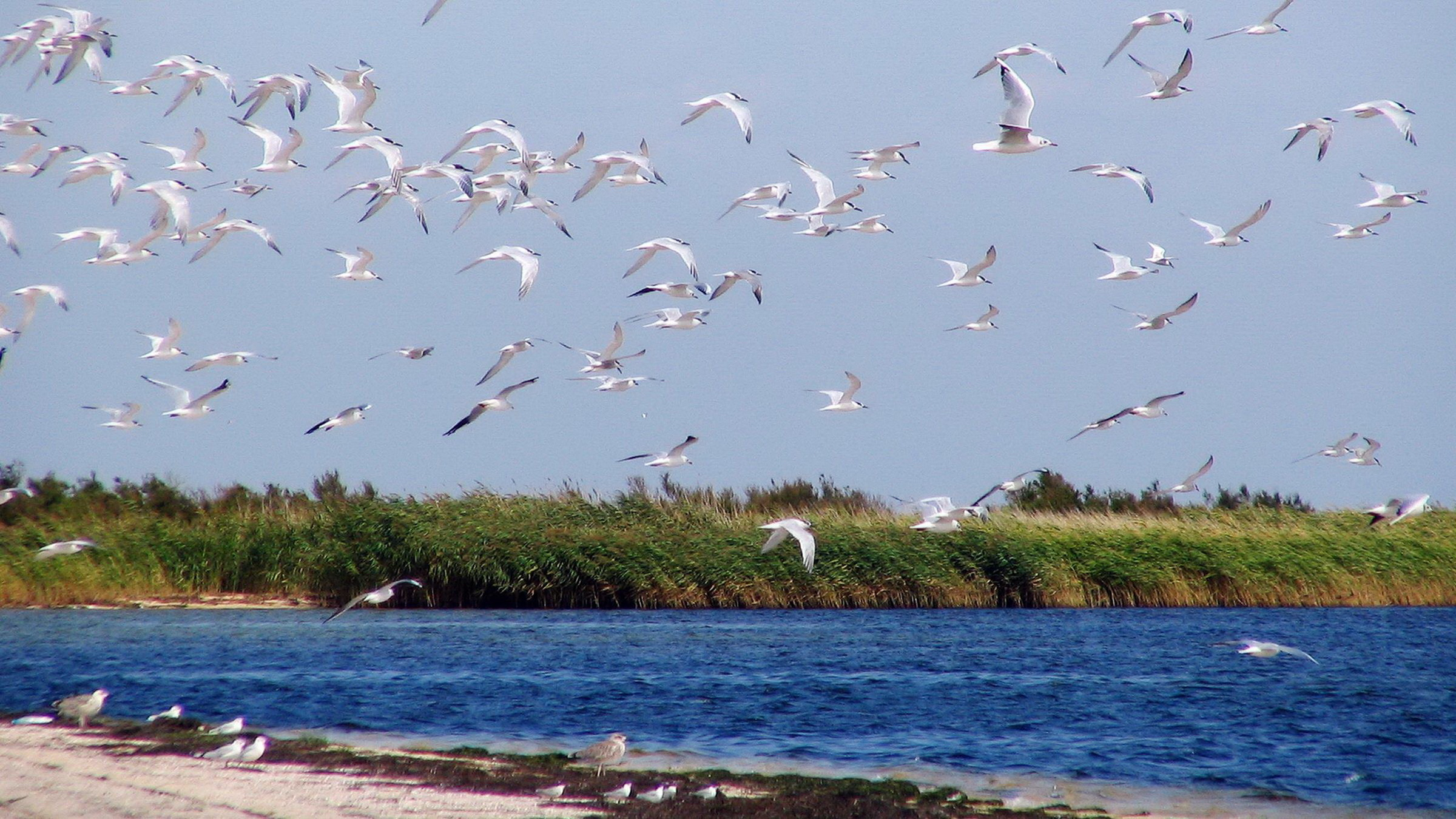
The migrating birds on the spit.
