= Sofiivka rural hromada =

Sofiivka rural hromada Коларівська селищна громада
- Hromada
- Interactive map of Sofiivka rural hromada
- Country: Ukraine
- Oblast: Zaporizhzhia Oblast
- Raion: Berdiansk Raion
- Admin. center: Sofiivka

Government
  - Head: Stanislav Zakharevych

Area
  - Total: 418.6 km^{2} (161.6 sq mi)

Population (2020)
  - Total: 5,600
  - Density: 13/km^{2} (35/sq mi)
- Settlements: 11
- Rural settlements: 2
- Villages: 9

Sofiivka rural hromada, also known as Kolarivka rural hromada (Ukrainian: Коларівська селищна громада), is a hromada of Ukraine, located in Berdiansk Raion, Zaporizhzhia Oblast. Its administrative center is the village of Sofiivka.

Since February 2022, the hromada has been occupied by Russia.

== Composition and extent ==
It has an area of 418.6 square kilometres (161.6 mi^{2}). The hromada contains 11 settlements, including 9 villages:

- Elyzavetivka
- Hiunivka
- Nelhivka
- Pidhirne
- Radolivka
- Sofiivka
- Yelyseivka
- Yurivka
- Zelenivka

And 2 rural-type settlements: Elyzavetivka and Nelhivka.

== History ==
=== Founding ===
Stanislav Zakharevych, current head of the hromada, has said that before the creation of the hromada, the villages that are now in the hromada were not very united or communal with each other. They had been divided into six village councils. Zakharevych said that previously, "several villages with a predominantly Ukrainian population kept themselves separate, as well as villages with a Bulgarian population or a mixed population".

On 12 June 2020, the hromada was officially created by an edict of the Verkhovna Rada of Ukraine, uniting the six village councils as part of decentralization reforms. Its original name was Kolarivka rural hromada. This name was seemingly derived from Kolarivka, the former name of Sofiivka - though, at the time, the name of the settlement was actually Bolharka. With economic self-sufficiency brought by decentralization, there began to be more unity among the population, according to Zakharevych. It was part of Prymorsk Raion originally, until that raion was abolished on 18 July 2020, and the hromada was transferred to Berdiansk Raion.

The first election in Kolarivka rural hromada was held on 25 October 2020. In January 2021, Serhiy Trofymenko, then-head of the hromada, died in the hospital after a vehicle accident. Elections were held later that year, with Stanislav Zakharevych, who had previously been offered a government position by Trofymenko, running as a candidate. According to Zakharevych, he was the object of mud-slinging, with his opponents baselessly accusing him of a criminal past and corruption. He unexpectedly won the election with 63% of the vote. Bolharka was renamed to Sofiivka on 7 October 2021.

=== Russian invasion of Ukraine ===
During the full-scale Russian invasion of Ukraine, the hromada was occupied by the Russian military beginning 26 February 2022. Some residents welcomed the invaders, but most shut themselves in their houses. In the early days of the occupation, the Russians shot two civilian cars from the hromada, killing one civilian and injuring two others. Some members of the hromada waged partisan resistance against the occupation, torching unattended Russian military vehicles in the night. However, the Russians mostly ignored what was happening in the area, mainly passing through on the highway that led to the city Zaporizhzhia. Stanislav Zakharevych, the democratically elected head of the hromada, was allowed to maintain his position. This made him unique among the hromada leaders of Berdiansk Raion. All others had been replaced by Russia-installed collaborationists. The Russians set up a checkpoint in mid-March 2022. The hromada took in refugees from Mariupol, a city to the east that was being put under a destructive siege by Russian forces. Reportedly, the occupiers mocked and degraded the Mariupolitans that arrived, asking them why they had fled their city and promising that Zaporizhzhia would become "a second Mariupol".

Eventually, in early June 2022, the Russians turned their attention to Sofiivka rural hromada. Militiamen from the Russian proxy Donetsk People's Republic along with some collaborationist police approached Zakharevych and offered him the position of "acting mayor of Prymorsk". When he refused, they took him into custody, angering the locals, who attempted to block off the exits to the village to keep their leader with them. Zakharevych told the locals to back down to avoid a violent confrontation, and he was taken to Prymorsk. There, he was pressured and threatened for hours, before being sent to a jail cell, where he was threatened with torture. Eventually, along with Melitopol mayor Ivan Fedorov, Zakharevych was released in a prisoner exchange, and he managed to reach a "relatively safe" place where he continued to organize aid to people of the occupied territories.

Speaking to media in March 2023, Zakharevych estimated that about 40% of the hromada's population had fled. He praised the hromada's people as "patriotic", because "almost no one in it wants to cooperate with the 'liberators'".

In the occupation administration, the officials apparently "got completely confused in the local administrative system". In the Russian documents, there are references to a "Kolarivka amalgamated hromada" (Note: Russian: Коларовская объединенная территориальная община) and a "Zelenivka amalgamated hromada" (Note: Russian: Зеленовская объединенная территориальная община), both with their center in Sofiivka (referred to as "Kolarivka", its former name). Additionally, the hromada is referred to in the documents as belonging to Prymorsk Raion (which was abolished in 2020), but with administration performed by the "VGA of Berdyanskyi District".

The economy has crashed in the economy, with little work available. The occupiers refuse to pay actual wages, instead paying in "fake money" or promising to pay little. There is also constant repressions and human rights abuses.

The Ukrainian military has blown up Russian warehouses and bases in the hromada during the occupation, with Ukrainian media referring to the explosions as "bavovna".

== Economy ==
As of the fourth quarter of 2021 the average income of a resident of the hromada was ₴5,764 - above the Zaporizhzhia Oblast average of ₴3,416.2 and far above the national average of ₴1,145.13. The hromada had high amounts of growth in the year before the Russian invasion of Ukraine, becoming the hromada with the third-highest income growth in Zaporizhzhia Oblast by the beginning of 2022. It was also the third-highest in terms of funds raised for the budget, only behind Prymorsk urban hromada and Berdiansk urban hromada.

== Demographics ==
The hromada had a population of 5,600, as of 2020. However, by late 2021, the population had dropped to around 4,700 people. The exact number of remaining residents is unknown.

The hromada has a population of diverse ethnic backgrounds. There are villages where the population is mainly Ukrainian, others where the people are predominantly of Bulgarian background, and others with diverse populations themselves.

== See also ==
- List of hromadas of Ukraine
