= Sofiivka =

Sofiivka (Ukrainian: Софіївка) may refer to several places in Ukraine:

- Sofiivka, Chernihiv Oblast
- Sofiivka, Dnipropetrovsk Oblast
- Sofiivka, Kherson Oblast
- Sofiivka, Kramatorsk Raion, Donetsk Oblast
- Sofiivka, Horlivka Raion, Donetsk Oblast
- Sofiivka, Sofiivka rural hromada, Berdiansk Raion, Zaporizhzhia Oblast
- Sofiyivka Park, Uman
