= Yasna Poliana =

Yasna Poliana (Ukrainian: Ясна Поляна) may refer to several places in Ukraine:

== Chernihiv Oblast ==
- Yasna Poliana, Chernihiv Oblast, village in Novhorod-Siverskyi Raion

== Donetsk Oblast ==
- Yasna Poliana, Kramatorsk Raion, Donetsk Oblast, urban-type settlement in Kramatorsk Raion
- Yasna Poliana, Volnovakha Raion, Donetsk Oblast, rural settlement in Volnovakha Raion

== Kharkiv Oblast ==
- Yasna Poliana, Kharkiv Oblast, village in Krasnohrad Raion

== Kherson Oblast ==
- Yasna Poliana, Henichesk urban hromada, Henichesk Raion, Kherson Oblast, village in Henichesk Raion
- Yasna Poliana, Novotroitske settlement hromada, Henichesk Raion, Kherson Oblast, village in Henichesk Raion
- Yasna Poliana, Kakhovka Raion, Kherson Oblast, village in Kakhovka Raion
- Yasna Poliana, Kherson Raion, Kherson Oblast, village in Kherson Raion

== Mykolaiv Oblast ==
- Yasna Poliana, Bashtanka Raion, Mykolaiv Oblast, rural settlement in Bashtanka Raion
- Yasna Poliana, Nova Odesa urban hromada, Mykolaiv Raion, Mykolaiv Oblast, village in Mykolaiv Raion
- Yasna Poliana, Mishkovo-Pohorilove rural hromada, Mykolaiv Raion, Mykolaiv Oblast, village in Mykolaiv Raion
- Yasna Poliana, Olshanske settlement hromada, Mykolaiv Raion, Mykolaiv Oblast, village in Mykolaiv Raion
- Yasna Poliana, Voznesensk Raion, Mykolaiv Oblast, village in Voznesensk Raion

== Sumy Oblast ==
- Yasna Poliana, Sumy Oblast, village in Shostka Raion

== Zaporizhzhia Oblast ==
- Yasna Poliana, Melitopol Raion, Zaporizhzhia Oblast, village in Melitopol Raion
- Yasna Poliana, Vasylivka Raion, Zaporizhzhia Oblast, village in Vasylivka Raion
- Yasna Poliana, Zaporizhzhia Raion, Zaporizhzhia Oblast, village in Zaporizhzhia Raion

== Zhytomyr Oblast ==
- Yasna Poliana, Zhytomyr Oblast, village in Zhytomyr Raion
