= Prymorsk Raion =

Former subdivision of Zaporizhzhia Oblast, Ukraine

Prymorsk Raion Приморський район
- Raion
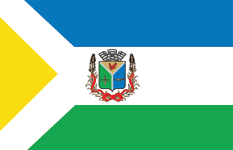
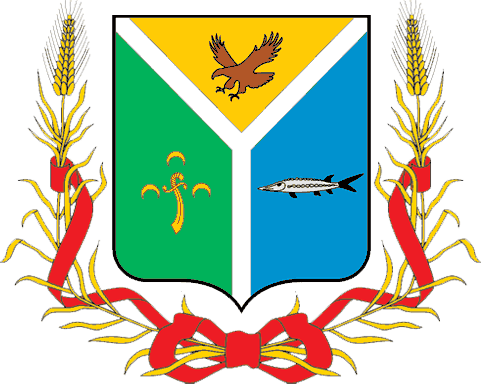
- Flag Coat of arms

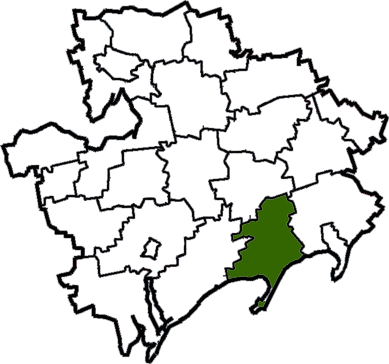
- Coordinates: 46°50′5.52″N 36°19′15.58″E
- Country: Ukraine
- Oblast: Zaporizhzhia Oblast
- Established: 1923
- Disestablished: 18 July 2020
- Admin. center: Prymorsk
- Subdivisions: List: 1 — city councils; 0 — settlement councils; 15 — rural councils; Number of localities: 1 — cities; 0 — urban-type settlements; 26 — villages; — rural settlements

Government
  - Governor: Oleksandr Onyshko

Area
  - Total: 1,400 km^{2} (540 sq mi)

Population (2020)
  - Total: 28,866 ▼
  - Density: 21/km^{2} (53/sq mi)
- Time zone: UTC+02:00 (EET)
  - Summer (DST): UTC+03:00 (EEST)
- Postal index: 72100—72151
- Area code: +380 6137
- Website: http://primorskadmin.org.ua

Prymorsk Raion (Ukrainian: Приморський район) was one of the raions (districts) of Zaporizhzhia Oblast in southern Ukraine between 1923 and 2020. The administrative center of the region was the city of Prymorsk. The raion was abolished on 18 July 2020 as part of the administrative reform of Ukraine, which reduced the number of raions of Zaporizhzhia Oblast to five. The area of Prymorsk Raion was merged into Berdiansk Raion. The last estimate of the raion population was 28,866 (2020 est.).

== History ==
The raion was created in 1923 during the time of the Soviet Union, under the name Nohaisk Raion (Ukrainian: Ногайський район). At the time, Prymorsk was known as Nohaisk. In October 1930 peasants in the raion rioted for three weeks against forced collectivization by the Soviet authorities.

It received the name Prymorsk Raion in 1964, when Nohaisk was renamed Prymorsk. In 1967, Prymorsk became a city of regional significance; while it still served as the administrative center of the raion, it was no longer subordinate to it, instead being subordinate directly to Zaporizhzhia Oblast within the Ukrainian SSR.

The raion was abolished on 18 July 2020 as part of the administrative reform of Ukraine, which reduced the number of raions of Zaporizhzhia Oblast to five. The area of Prymorsk Raion was merged into Berdiansk Raion.

== Administrative divisions ==
At the time of its abolition, Prymorsk Raion was divided into three hromadas:

- Kolarivka rural hromada, centered in the village Bolharka (now Sofiivka)
- Novooleksiivka rural hromada, centered in the village Novooleksiivka
- Prymorsk urban hromada, centered in Prymorsk
