= Maria Limanskaya =

Soviet soldier (1924–2024)

Mariya Limanskaya
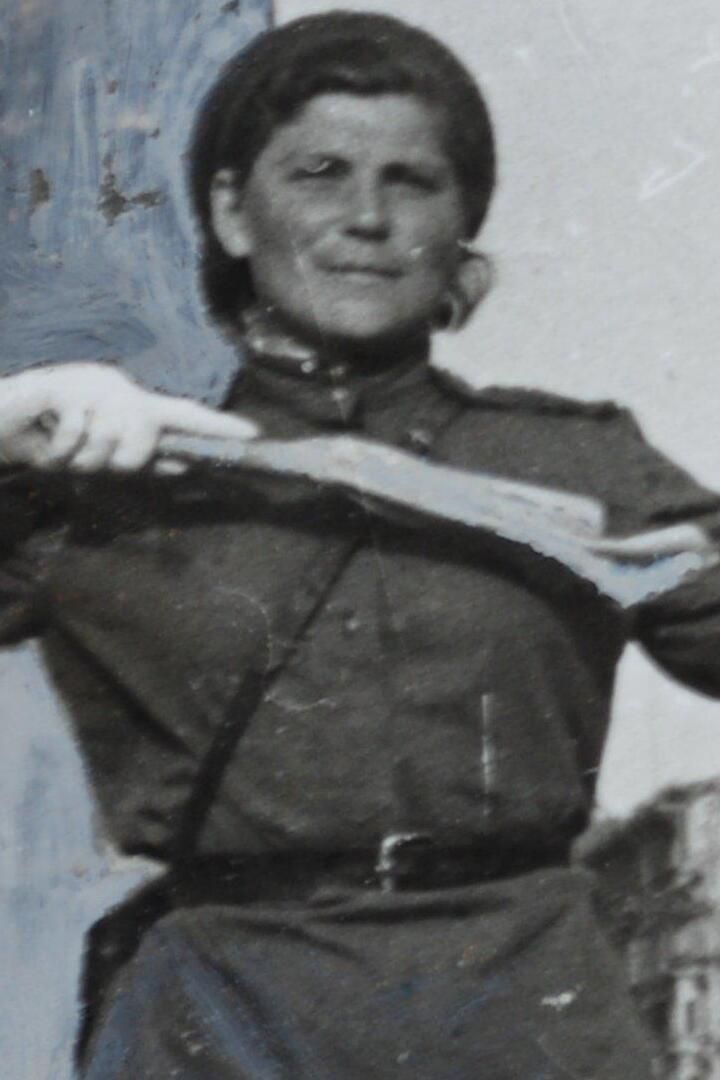
- Detail of Yevgeny Khaldei's famous photograph of Limanskaya
- Native name: Мария Филипповна Лиманская
- Born: 12 April 1924; Staraya Poltavka, Volga German ASSR, Russian SFSR, USSR
- Died: 26 November 2024 (aged 100) Saratov Oblast, Russia
- Allegiance: Soviet Union
- Branch: Red Army
- Service years: 1942–1945
- Rank: Corporal
- Awards: Order of the Patriotic War, 2nd class Medal of Zhukov

Mariya Filippovna Limanskaya (Russian: Мария Филипповна Лиманская; 12 April 1924 – 26 November 2024) was a Soviet military traffic guard – a female member of Red Army traffic control units, serving for three years during World War II. She became known as one of the Russian women who directed traffic at the Brandenburg Gate in 1945 after the Battle of Berlin. She then became a symbol of the Allied victory over Germany.

== Biography ==
=== Early life and military service ===
Born in 1924 as Mariya Limanskaya, she joined the Red Army in 1942, at the height of World War II. She was 18. At that time the Soviet Stavka ("high command") increasingly lacked trained reserves to reinforce the entire 2,000-kilometre (1,200 mi) front, and as a result began to conscript underage boys and girls. Almost 800,000 women would eventually serve in the Red Army throughout the war. On several occasions she was nearly killed. At one point, she left a building a few seconds before it was leveled by a bomb attack. She also contracted malaria. During the war, Limanskaya regulated the movement of troops across the Don under enemy fire, and participated in the Battle of Stalingrad and the liberation of Belarus and Poland.

=== Brandenburg Gate and victory icon ===
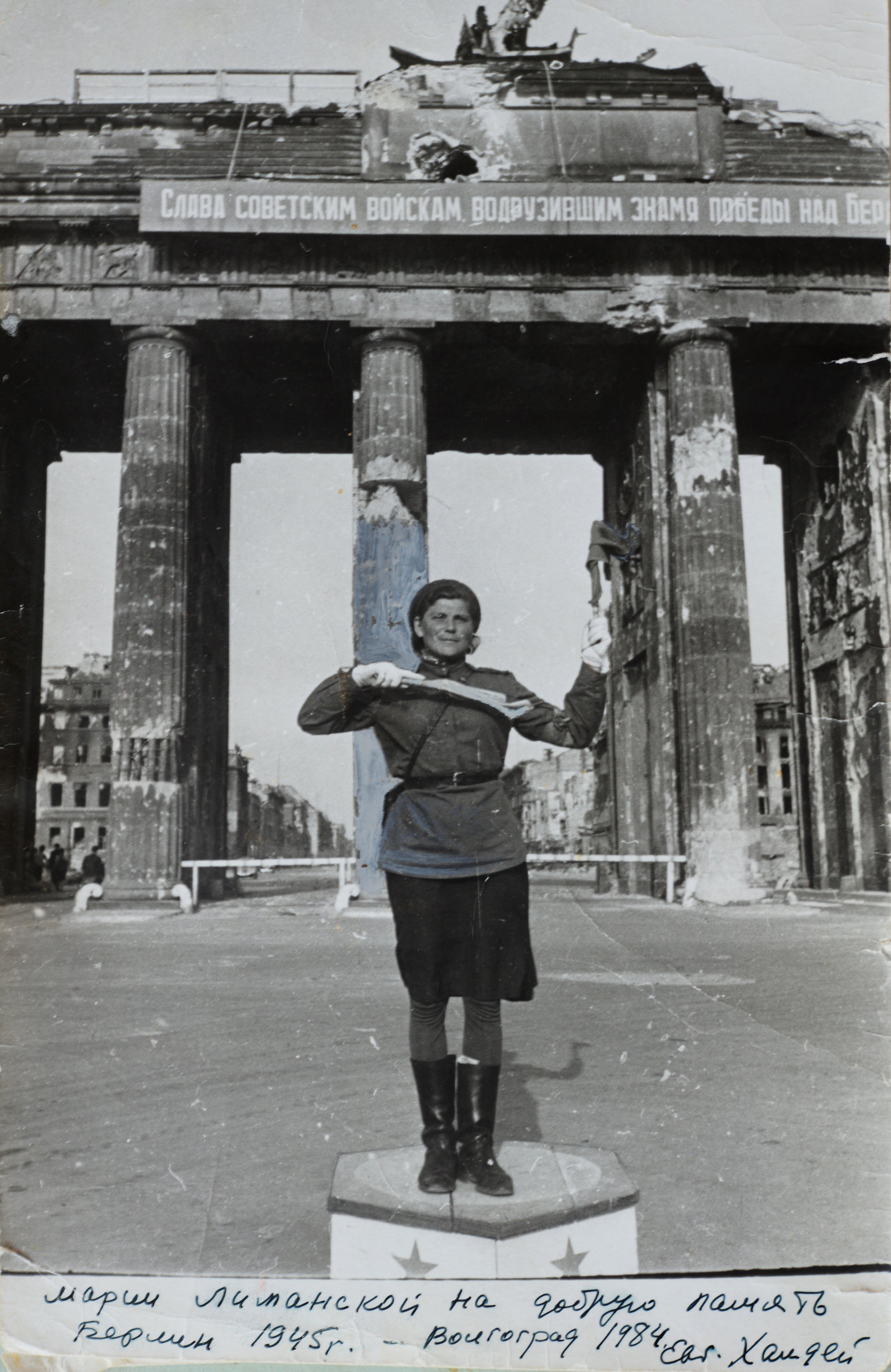
Yevgeny Khaldei's famous photograph of Limanskaya, with his inscription from 1984

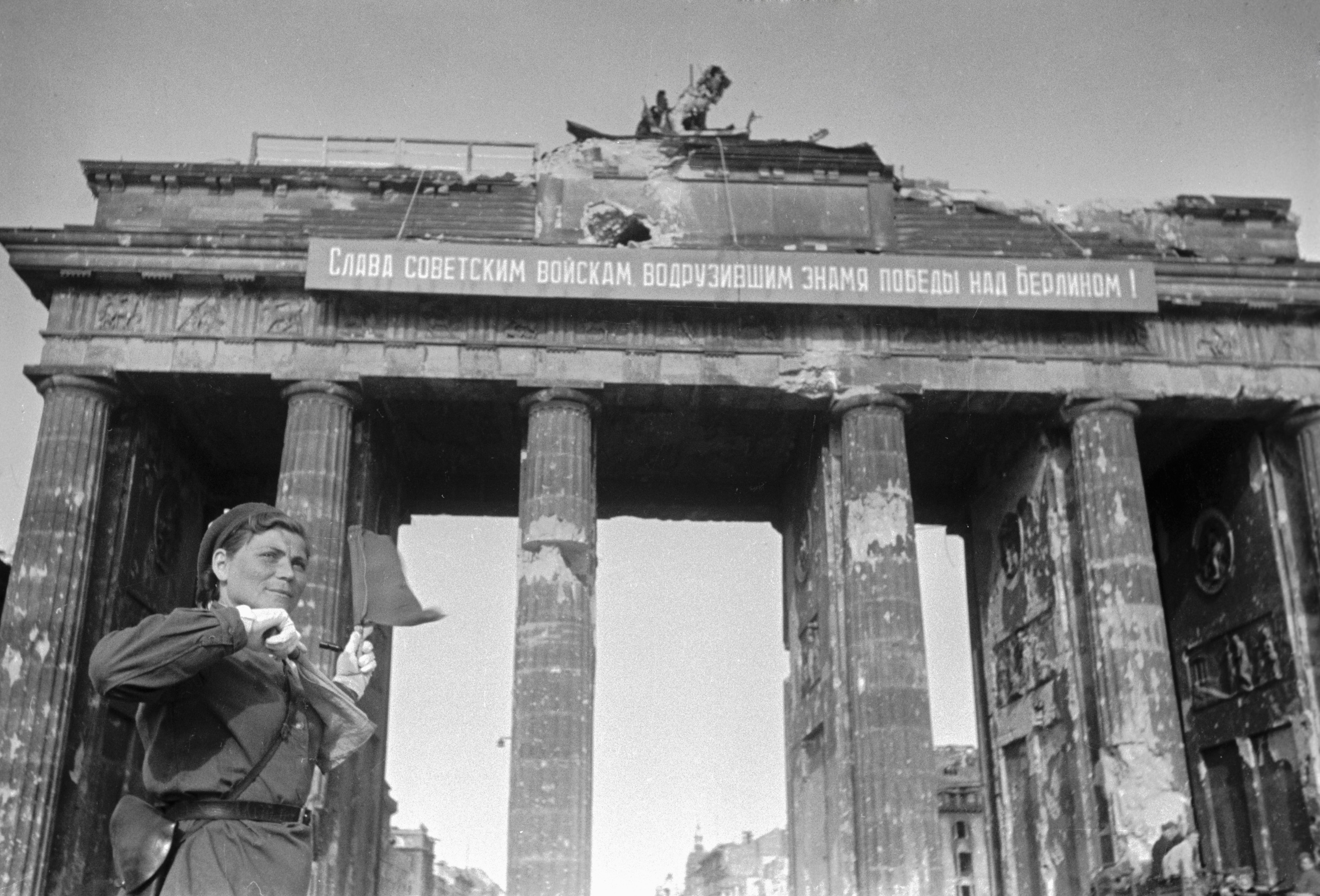
A different angle of Khaldei's photograph

After the Battle of Berlin ended in early May 1945, Limanskaya was assigned to direct traffic at the Brandenburg Gate during the Potsdam Conference in late July. While conducting her duties, she was photographed, filmed, and also interviewed by Yevgeny Khaldei, a journalist employed by TASS. Her picture was widely published in newspapers and magazines worldwide and she quickly became an iconic image of the victory over Germany. However, all of this is possibly confusion with Lydia Spivak, another regulator who was actually filmed and interviewed at the Brandenburg gate. Limanskaya furthermore had a brief conversation with British prime minister Winston Churchill as his entourage was passing by the gate on their way to Potsdam. Limanskaya later said about her meeting Churchill, "[he] looked precisely the way I imagined him, puffing on a cigar".

=== Later life and death ===
After the war, Limanskaya returned to civilian life and got married. The marriage did not last and she was forced to bring up two daughters by herself. Limanskaya later remarried, this time to a fellow veteran named Viktor with whom she remained for 23 years, until his death. She worked as a nurse, and then a school librarian in Volgograd. Since 1994, she lived with her daughter in the village of Zvonaryovka, in the Saratov region.

Limanskaya turned 100 on 12 April 2024, and died on 26 November of the same year.

== See also ==
- Soviet women in World War II
- Women in the Russian and Soviet military

== Sources ==
=== Printed ===
- Goldstein, Joshua (2003). War and Gender: How Gender Shapes the War System and Vice Versa. Cambridge University. ISBN 978-0521001809.

=== Online ===
- "Maria Limanskaya – Forgotten Iconic Image of the Second World War". Mark Simner.
