= Chernihivskyi Raion =

Chernihivskyi Raion may refer to:

== Ukraine ==
- Chernihiv Raion, a raion of Chernihiv Oblast:
- Chernihivka Raion, a raion of Zaporizhia Oblast.

== Russia ==
- Chernigovsky District (Chernigovsky Raion), a raion in Primorsky Krai.
