= Kotliarivka =

Kotliarivka (Ukrainian: Котлярівка) may refer to one of the following locations in Ukraine:

== Villages ==
- Kotliarivka, Dnipro Raion, Dnipropetrovsk Oblast
- Kotliarivka, Krynychansky Raion, Dnipropetrovsk Oblast
- Kotliarivka, Kharkiv Oblast
- Kotliarivka, Zaporizhzhia Oblast

== Settlements ==
- Kotliarivka, Donetsk Oblast
