= Chernihivka settlement hromada =

Chernihivka settlement hromada Чернігівська селищна громада
- Hromada
- Interactive map of Chernihivka settlement hromada
- Country: Ukraine
- Oblast: Zaporizhzhia Oblast
- Raion: Berdiansk Raion

Area
  - Total: 1,201.2 km^{2} (463.8 sq mi)

Population (2020)
  - Total: 15,847
  - Density: 13.193/km^{2} (34.169/sq mi)
- Settlements: 41
- Rural settlements: 4
- Villages: 36
- Towns: 1

Chernihivka settlement hromada (Ukrainian: Чернігівська селищна громада) is a hromada of Ukraine, located in Berdiansk Raion, Zaporizhzhia Oblast. Its administrative center is the town of Chernihivka.

It has an area of 1,201.2 square kilometres (463.8 mi^{2}) and a population of 15,847, as of 2020.

The hromada includes 41 settlements: 1 town (Chernihivka), 36 villages:

- Balashivka
- Blahodatne
- Bohdanivka
- Boivove
- Verkhnii Tokmak
- Vladivka
- Dovhe
- Zamistia
- Zelenyi Yar
- Zoria
- Iline
- Kalynivka
- Kamianka
- Kvitkove
- Kotliarivka
- Kryzhchene
- Lankove
- Mohyliany
- Mokryi Stav
- Nizhnii Tokmak
- Novokazankuvate
- Novomykhailivka
- Novopoltavka
- Obitochne
- Oleksandrivka
- Petropavlivka
- Pirchyne
- Prostore
- Rozivka
- Saltychiia
- Stepove
- Stulneve
- Tarasivka
- Khmelnytske
- Chernihovo-Tokmachansk
- Shyrokyi Yar

And 4 rural-type settlements: Krasne, Stulneve, Verkhnii Tokmak Druhyi, and Verkhnii Tokmak Pershyi.

== See also ==
- List of hromadas of Ukraine
