= Chernihivka =

Rural locality in Zaporizhzhia Oblast, Ukraine

Chernihivka Чернігівка
- Rural settlement
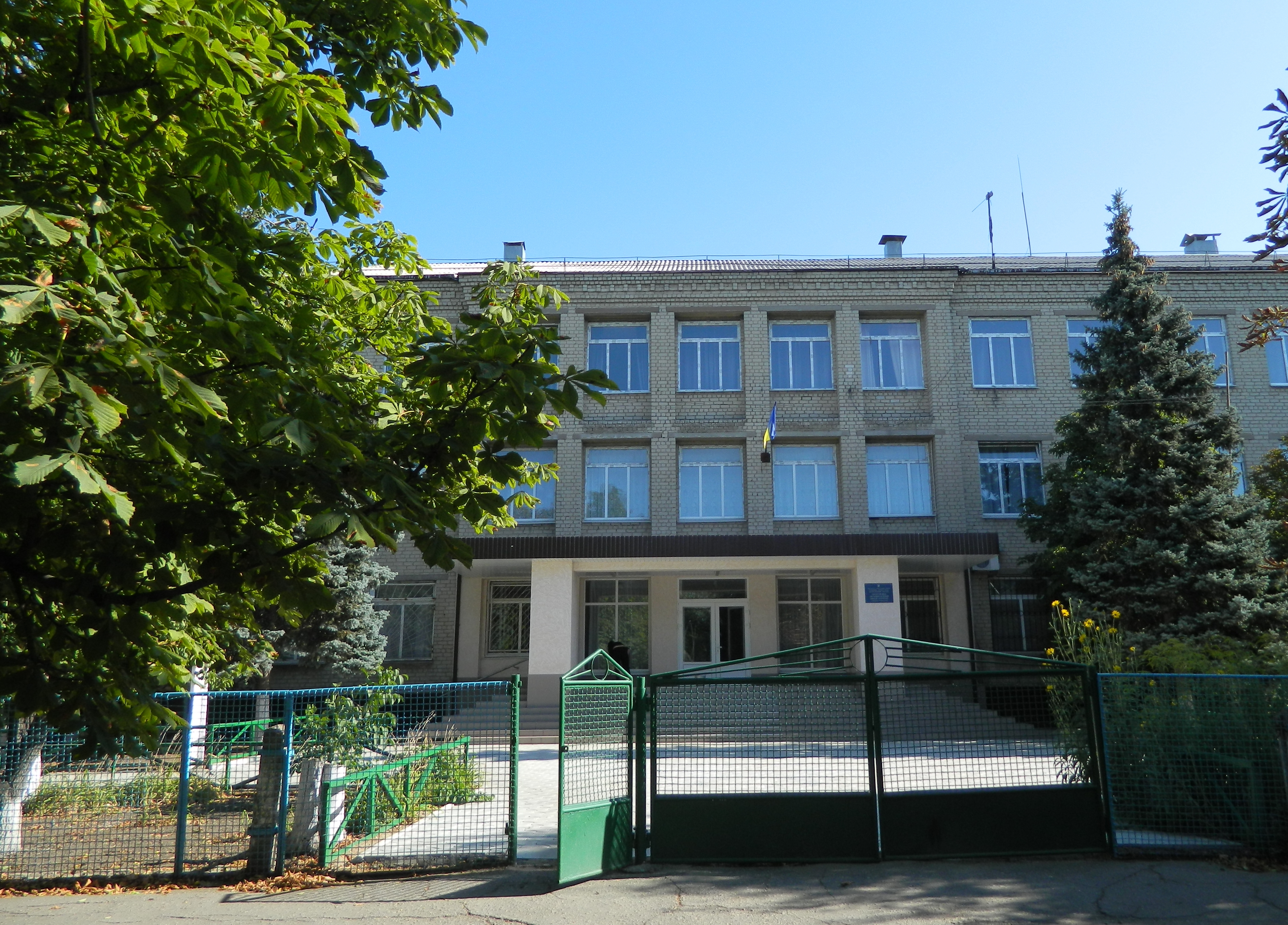
- School in Chernihivka

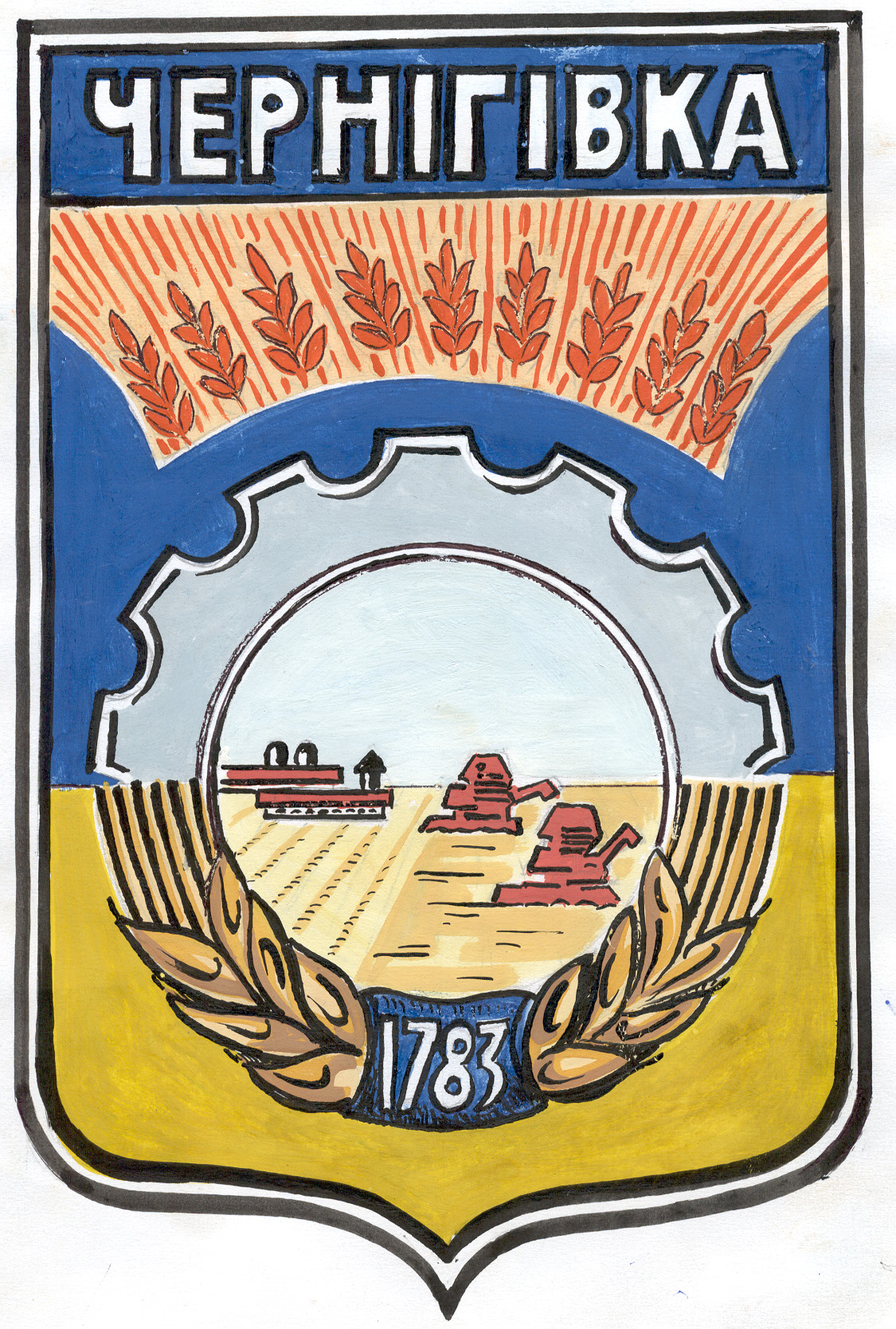
- Coat of arms
- Interactive map of Chernihivka
- Location within Zaporizhzhia Oblast Location within Ukraine
- Coordinates: 47°11′26″N 36°11′55″E
- Country: Ukraine
- Oblast: Zaporizhzhia Oblast
- Raion: Berdiansk Raion
- Hromada: Chernihivka settlement hromada
- Established: 1783

Population (2022)
  - Total: 5,500
- Postal code: 712XX
- Area code: +380 6140
- urban-type settlement, city rights since 1957

Chernihivka (Ukrainian: Чернігівка; Russian: Черни́говка) is a rural settlement in Berdiansk Raion, Zaporizhzhia Oblast, Ukraine. Prior to 2020, it was also the administrative center of the former Chernihivka Raion. It has a population of 5,500 (2022 estimate).

Chernihivka is situated midway between the cities of Zaporizhzhia and Berdyansk on the bank of Tokmak River in the geographic territory known as Azov Upland. The town is located in the middle of the Pontic steppe away from major highways and railways.

Chernihivka is a populated place of Chernihivka settlement council, which is a municipal community and beside the town also includes two rural settlements and four neighboring villages.

After the Russian Invasion of Ukraine in 2022, the settlement has since been occupied by Russian forces.

== History ==
Chernihivka was founded in 1783, by villagers from Chernigov Governorate (Chernihiv Governorate), who lived on territory of the today's Romny Raion (Sumy Oblast).

During the Ukrainian War of Independence, from 1917 to 1920, it passed between various factions. Afterwards it was administratively part of the Zaporizhzhia Governorate of Ukraine.

Until 26 January 2024, Chernihivka was designated urban-type settlement. On this day, a new law entered into force which abolished this status, and Chernihivka became a rural settlement.

After being captured and occupied by Russian forces during the Russian invasion of Ukraine, the settlement repeatedly became the scene of Ukrainian guerilla warfare.

== Economy ==
The agrarian company Zorya (meaning Star) plays an important role in the region. During the Soviet times the company was called Zarya Kommunizma (the Dawn of Communism).

== Demographics ==
As of the 2001 Ukrainian census, the town had a population of 7,415 inhabitants, which decreased to 5,500 in early 2022. The native languages in the settlement were as follows:

Native languages in Chernihivka
	percent
Ukrainian	94.1%
Russian	5.5%
Armenian	0.1%
Belarusian	0.1%
Hungarian	0.1%
others	0.2%

== People from Chernihivka ==
- Volodymyr Horilyi (born 1965), Soviet and Ukrainian footballer
- Lydia Spivak (1925-1984), Soviet-Ukrainian WW2 veteran, The Mistress of Brandenburg Gate
