= Kotliarivka, Zaporizhzhia Oblast =

Village in Ukraine

Kotliarivka Котлярівка
- Village
- Interactive map of Kotliarivka
- Location of Kotliarivka Kotliarivka (Ukraine)
- Coordinates: 47°7′11″N 36°15′16″E
- Country: Ukraine
- Oblast: Zaporizhzhia Oblast
- Raion: Berdiansk Raion
- Hromada: Chernihivka settlement hromada
- Elevation: 191 m (627 ft)

Population (2001 census)
  - Total: 1
- Time zone: UTC+2 (EET)
  - Summer (DST): UTC+3 (EEST)
- Postal code: 71200
- Area code: +380 6140

Kotliarivka (Ukrainian: Котлярівка) is a village in the Chernihivka settlement hromada, Berdiansk Raion of Zaporizhzhia Oblast, Ukraine.

== Overview ==
Kotliarivka is 16 km away from the hromada's administrative centre, Chernihivka.

As of 2015, the village had a population of 1.

On 12 June 2020, the village became part of Chernihivka settlement hromada. On the liquidation of Chernihivka Raion, the village became part of Berdiansk Raion.
