= Kramatorsk urban hromada =

Kramatorsk urban hromada Краматорська міська громада
- Hromada
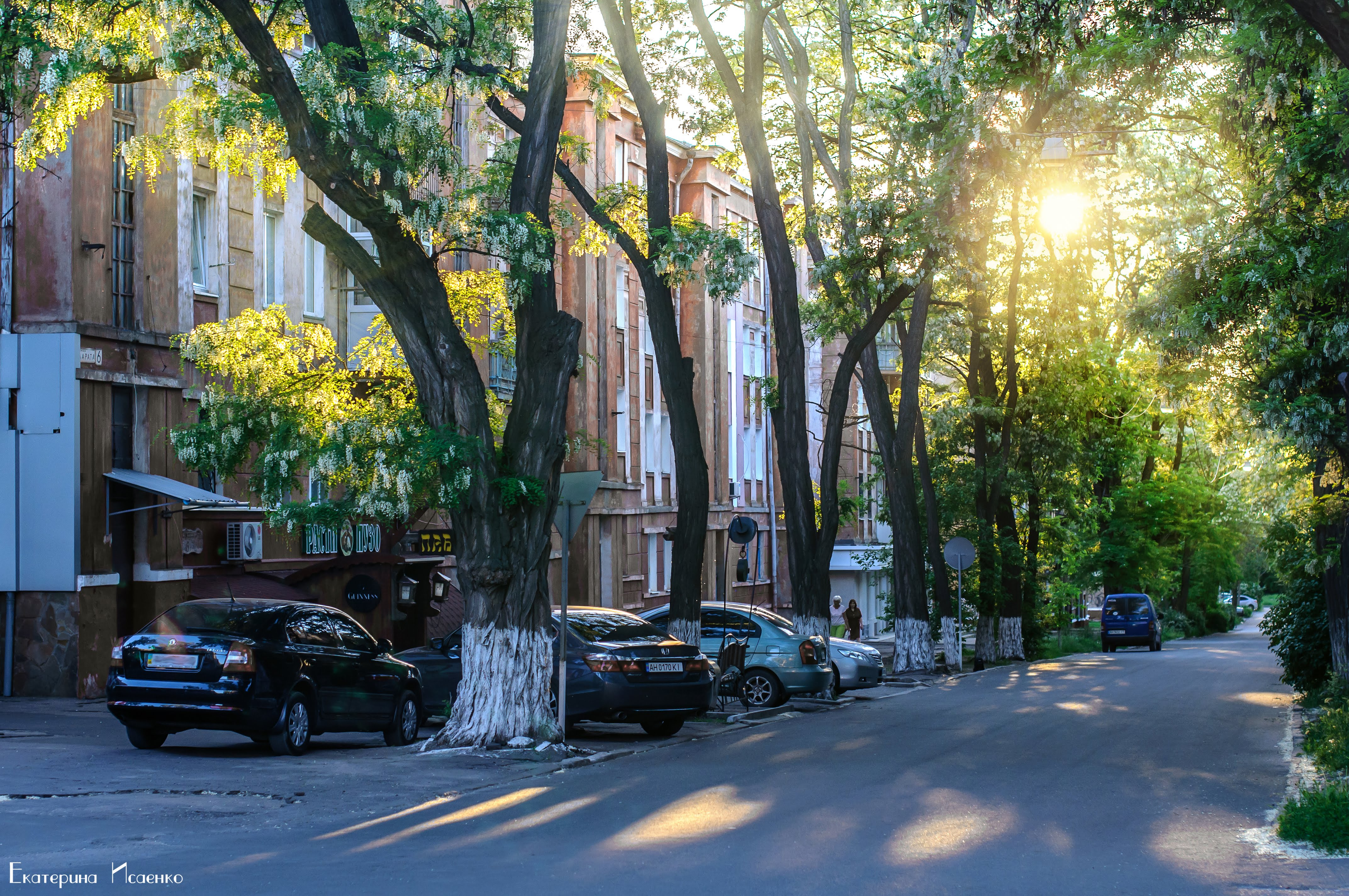
- Neighborhood street in of Kramatorsk
- Interactive map of Kramatorsk urban hromada
- Country: Ukraine
- Oblast: Donetsk
- Raion: Kramatorsk

Area
  - Total: 412.7 km^{2} (159.3 sq mi)

Population (2020)
  - Total: 183,946
  - Density: 445.7/km^{2} (1,154/sq mi)
- Settlements: 15
- Cities: 1
- Villages: 5
- Towns: 9

Kramatorsk urban hromada (Ukrainian: Краматорська міська громада) is a hromada of Ukraine, located in Kramatorsk Raion, Donetsk Oblast. Its administrative center is the city Kramatorsk.

It has an area of 412.7 square kilometres (159.3 mi^{2}) and a population of 183,946, as of 2020.

The hromada contains 15 settlements: 1 city (Kramatorsk), 9 rural settlements:

- Bilenke
- Komyshuvakha
- Krasnotorka
- Malotaranivka
- Oleksandrivka
- Sofiivka
- Shabelkivka
- Yasna Poliana
- Yasnohirka

And 5 villages:

- Ashurkove
- Vasylivska Pustosh
- Dmytrivka
- Pryvillya
- Semenivka

== See also ==
- List of hromadas of Ukraine
