= Yasnohirka, Donetsk Oblast =

Yasnohirka Ясногірка
- Rural settlement
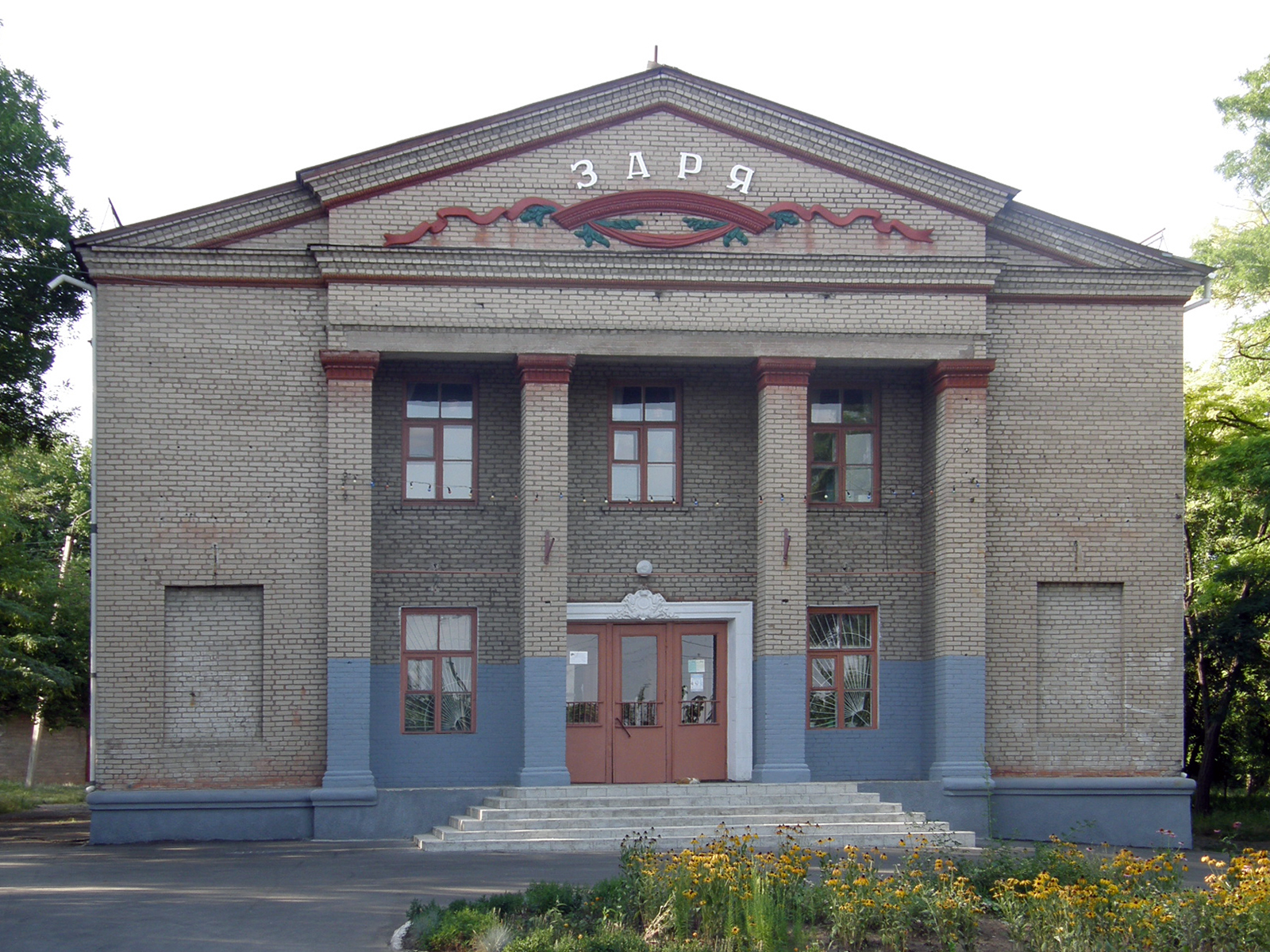

- Location of Yasnohirka Yasnohirka (Ukraine)
- Coordinates: 48°46′03″N 37°34′01″E
- Country: Ukraine
- Oblast: Donetsk Oblast
- Raion: Kramatorsk Raion
- Hromada: Kramatorsk urban hromada
- Founded: 1782

Area
  - Total: 11.606 km^{2} (4.481 sq mi)
- Elevation: 83 m (272 ft)

Population (2022)
  - Total: 8,030
  - Estimate (13.08.2026): ~4,000
  - Density: 692/km^{2} (1,790/sq mi)
- Time zone: UTC+2 (EET)
  - Summer (DST): UTC+3 (EEST)
- Postal code: 84391
- Area code: +380 626(4)

Yasnohirka (Ukrainian: Ясногірка) is a rural settlement in Kramatorsk Raion, Donetsk Oblast, eastern Ukraine. Population: 8,030 (2022 estimate).

== Demographics ==
Native language as of the Ukrainian Census of 2001:

- Ukrainian 61.36%
- Russian 38.05%
- Armenian 0.42%
- Belarusian 0.07%
- German 0.02%

== Notable People ==
- Legeza Viktor Petrovych
