= Prymorsk =

City in Zaporizhzhia Oblast, Ukraine

Prymorsk Приморськ (Ukrainian) Приморск (Russian) Primorsk
- City
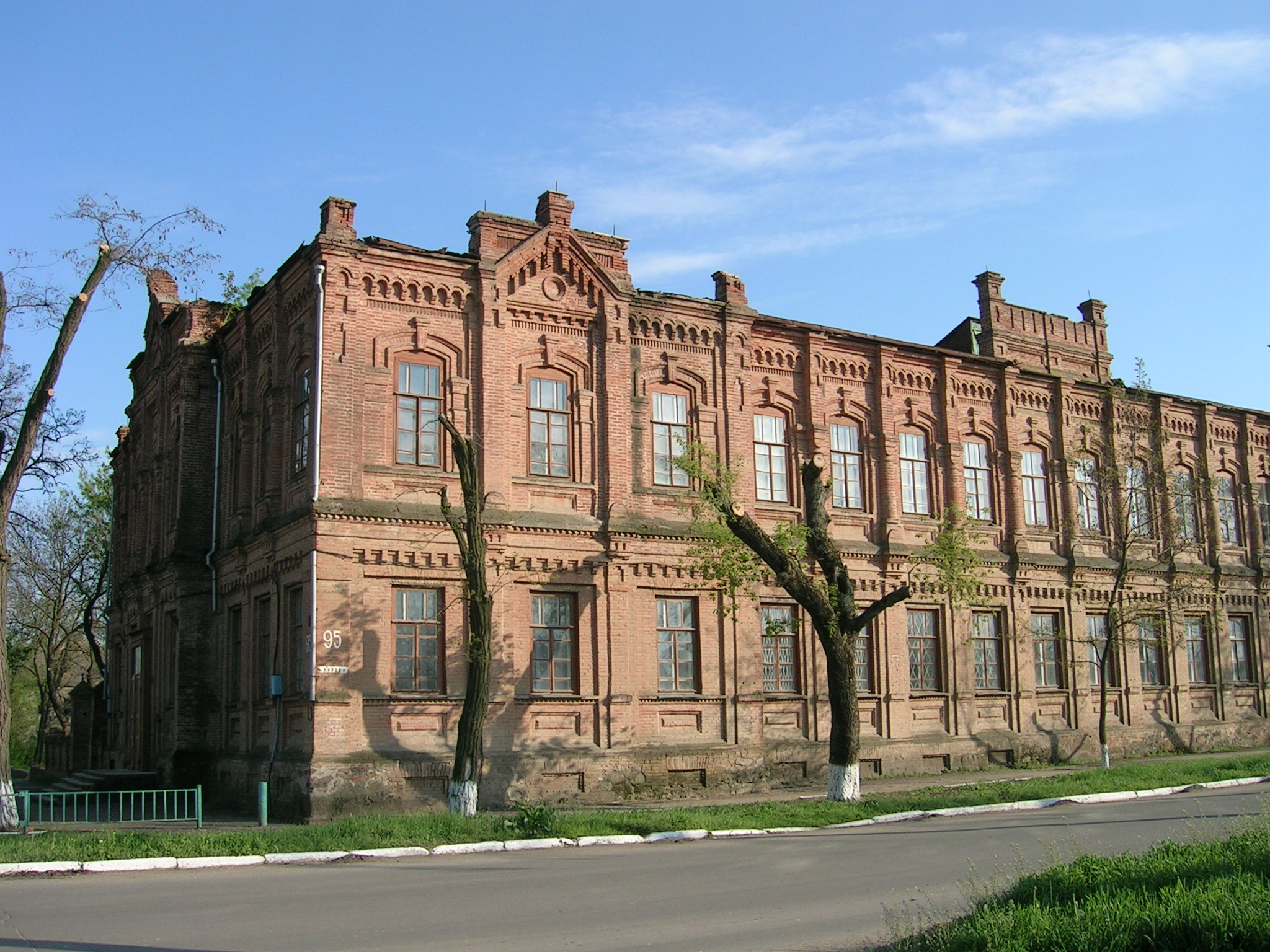
- District library in Prymorsk

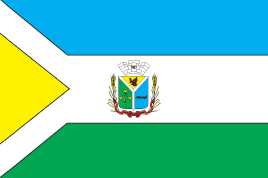
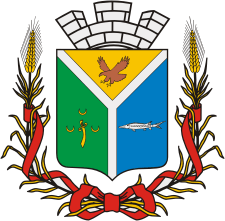
- Flag Coat of arms
- Interactive map of Prymorsk
- Location within Zaporizhzhia Oblast Location within Ukraine
- Country: Ukraine
- Oblast: Zaporizhzhia Oblast
- Raion: Berdiansk Raion
- Hromada: Prymorsk urban hromada
- Founded: 1800

Area
  - Total: 1,282 km^{2} (495 sq mi)

Population (2022)
  - Total: 11,157
  - Density: 8.703/km^{2} (22.54/sq mi)
- Climate: Cfa

Prymorsk (Ukrainian: Приморськ (Note: IPA: [prɪˈmɔrsʲk])) or Primorsk (Russian: Приморск (Note: IPA: [prʲiˈmɔrsk])) is a city in Zaporizhzhia Oblast, Ukraine. It serves as the administrative center of Prymorsk urban hromada in Berdiansk Raion. Population: 11,157 (2022 estimate).

== History ==
Prymorsk was a settlement in Taurida Governorate of the Russian Empire, originally known as Nohaisk (Ukrainian: Ногайськ) after the Turkic Nogai people who lived in the area until the nineteenth century. In 1923, Nohaisk became the center of Nohaisk Raion. In 1938, Nohaisk became an urban-type settlement.

In 1964, Prymorsk received its modern name, along with Nohaisk Raion being renamed to Prymorsk Raion. In 1967, Prymorsk became a city of regional significance; while it still served as the administrative center of the raion, it was no longer subordinate to it, instead being subordinate directly to Zaporizhzhia Oblast within the Ukrainian SSR. In 1974 the population was 11.9 thousand people.

In January 1989, the population was 13 965 people.

Prymorsk Raion was abolished on 18 July 2020 as part of the administrative reform of Ukraine, which reduced the number of raions of Zaporizhzhia Oblast to five. The area of Prymorsk Raion was merged into Berdiansk Raion. In 2022, during the Russian invasion of Ukraine, the city was occupied by Russian troops. In February 2023, the head of the Prymorsk City Military Administration, Svitlana Makedonska, reported that Russians were seizing property owned by Ukrainian citizens and that people were living in occupied territories ″as if in ghettos″.

== Geography ==
Prymorsk is located in the Pryazovia on the river Obitichna at the place of its confluence with the river Kiltytchtchia, on the northwestern shore of Berdiansk Bay on the northern part of the Azov Sea. Downstream, 3.5 km away, there is Komyshuvatka. Upstream, 0.5 km away, and on the oppsite shore there is Banivka.

There are two highways passing through the city M 14 E58. Distance to the administrative centre is 180 km and passes through the P37 and M 18.

== Demographics ==
As of the Ukrainian national census in 2001, Prymorsk had a population of 12,860 inhabitants. Most of the predominately Russian-speaking population is ethnically Ukrainian, people with a Russian background make up the second-largest group. A large minority of Taurida Bulgarians also exists in Prymorsk. Other minorities include Black Sea Germans, Belarusians and Armenians. The exact ethnic and linguistic composition was as follows:

Ethnic groups in Prymorsk
	percent
Ukrainians	61.28%
Russians	28.08%
Bulgarians	8.28%
Belarusians	0.62%
Tatars	0.33%
Armenians	0.18%
Germans	0.12%
Georgians	0.09%

First languages (2001)
	percent
Russian	73.4%
Ukrainian	25.0%
Bulgarian	1.3%
Belarusian	0.1%
others	0.2%

== Transport ==
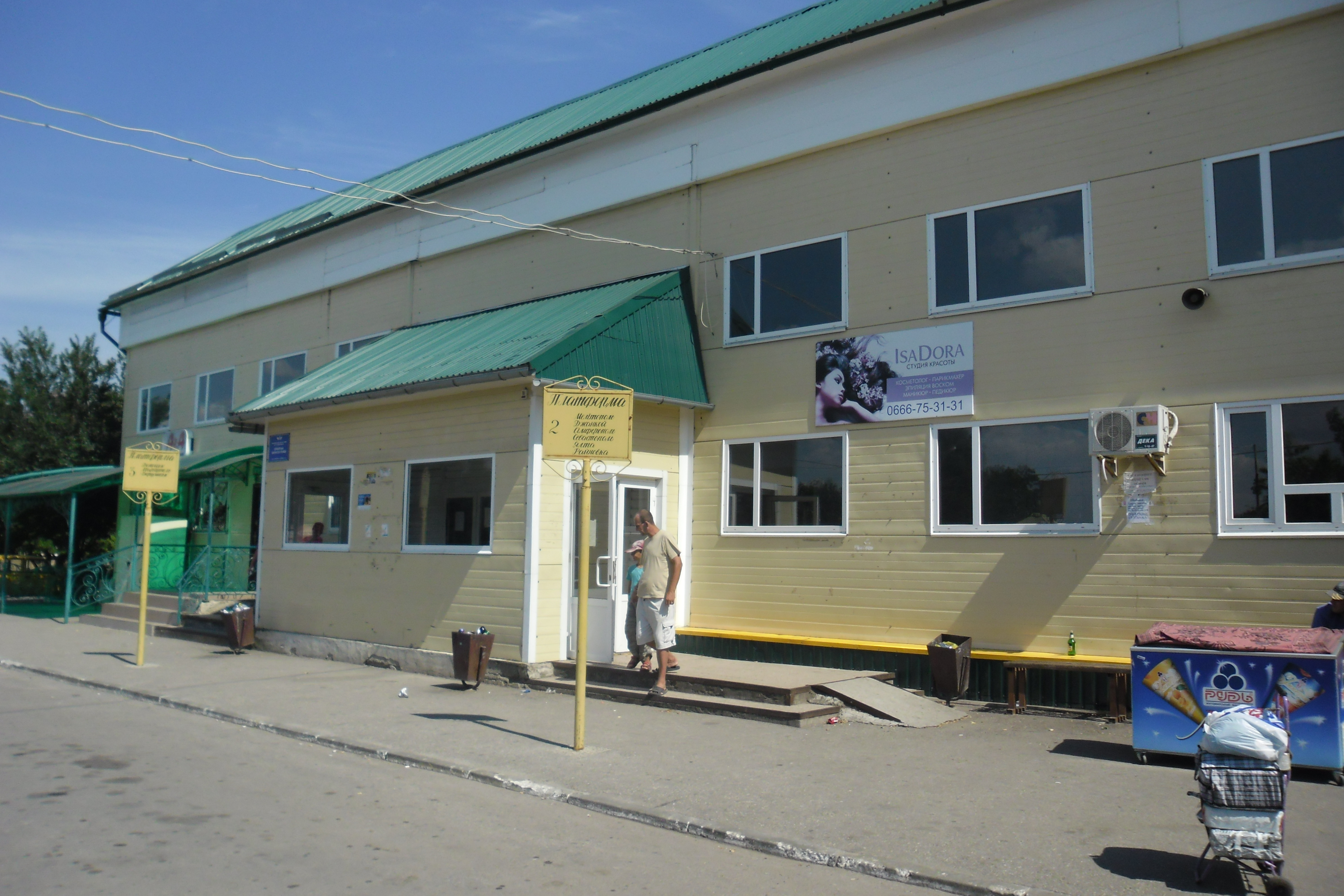
Bus depot in Prymorsk

There is a national highway passing through the city Odesa — Melitopol — Novoazovsk — Rostov-on-Don ( E58, or M 14 inside Ukraine). There is no railway in the city. The closest railway is located in Ielizavetivka, which is 32km away from Prymorsk.

The closest airport is located in the administrative centre — Zaporizhzhia. A seaport can be found in Berdiansk.

The public transport consists of 4 buses, 2 of which are seasonal, that connect the centre of the city and bus depot with the resorts along the coast of the Azov Sea.

== Economy ==
Since 2019, there is a Prymosrk wind farm with a total power output of 200 MW
