= Berdiansk urban hromada =

Berdiansk urban hromada Бердянська міська громада
- Hromada
- Interactive map of Berdiansk urban hromada
- Country: Ukraine
- Oblast: Zaporizhzhia Oblast
- Raion: Berdiansk Raion

Area
  - Total: 252.2 km^{2} (97.4 sq mi)

Population (2020)
  - Total: 112,783
  - Density: 447.2/km^{2} (1,158/sq mi)
- Settlements: 5
- Cities: 1
- Rural settlements: 1
- Villages: 3

Berdiansk urban hromada (Ukrainian: Бердянська міська громада) is a hromada of Ukraine, located in Berdiansk Raion, Zaporizhzhia Oblast. Its administrative center is the city of Berdiansk.

It has an area of 252.2 square kilometres (97.4 mi^{2}) and a population of 112,783, as of 2020.

The hromada contains 5 settlements: 1 city (Berdiansk), 3 villages:

- Azovske
- Novovasylivka
- Roza

And 1 rural-type settlement: Shovkove.

== See also ==
- List of hromadas of Ukraine
