= Malotaranivka =

Malotaranivka Малотаранівка
- Rural settlement
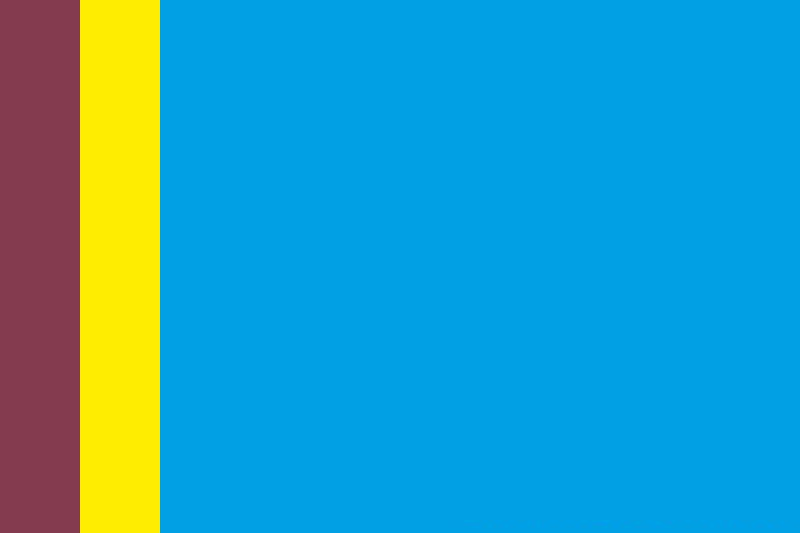
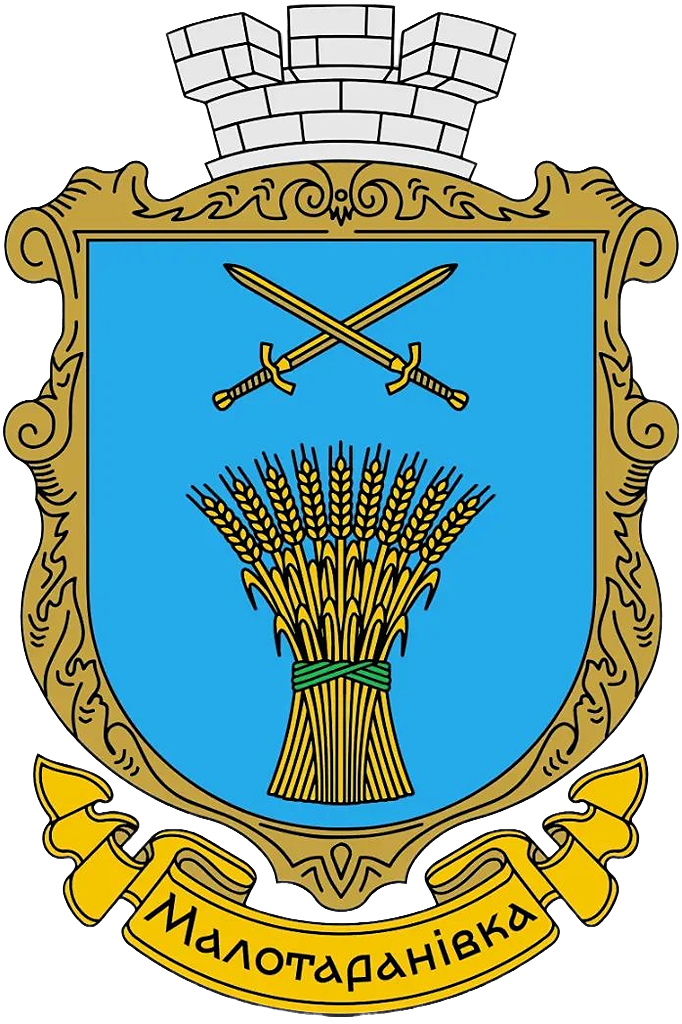
- Flag Coat of arms

- Location of Malotaranivka Malotaranivka (Ukraine)
- Coordinates: 48°39′38″N 37°30′15″E
- Country: Ukraine
- Oblast: Donetsk Oblast
- Raion: Kramatorsk Raion
- Hromada: Kramatorsk urban hromada
- Elevation: 78 m (256 ft)

Population (2022)
  - Total: 3,768
- Time zone: UTC+2 (EET)
  - Summer (DST): UTC+3 (EEST)
- Postal code: 84396
- Area code: +380 626

Malotaranivka (Ukrainian: Малотаранівка) is a rural settlement in Kramatorsk Raion, Donetsk Oblast, eastern Ukraine. Population: 3,498 (2025 estimate), 3,768 (2022 estimate).

== History ==
The first written mention of Malotaranivka dates back to the late 1850s and early 1860s and is found in the description of the general and special land survey of the Izyumsky Uyezd of the Kharkiv province.

On October 4, 1933, due to the loss of agricultural status, the village was transformed into a settlement by a resolution of the All-Ukrainian Central Executive Committee.

German troops captured the village on October 24, 1941.

Soviet troops recaptured the village in September 1943.

== Demographics ==
Native language as of the Ukrainian Census of 2001:

- Ukrainian 68.76%
- Russian 30.76%
- Armenian 0.72%
- Belarusian 0.18%
- Moldovan (Romanian) 0.05%

== Notable People ==
Dotsenko Yuriy Timofiyovych 1954
