= Lydia Spivak =

Soviet soldier

Lidiya Andreevna Spivak
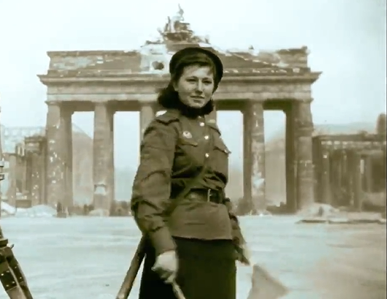
- Spivak in 1945
- Born: 1925; Chernihivka, Ukrainian SSR, USSR
- Died: October 13, 1984 (aged 58–59); Donetsk, Ukrainian SSR, USSR
- Education: Dnipropetrovsk University
- Military career
- Allegiance: Soviet Union
- Branch: Red Army
- Rank: Junior Sergeant
- Nickname: The Mistress of the Brandenburg Gate
- Conflicts: World War II; Eastern Front

Lydia Spivak (1925–1984) was a Soviet junior sergeant who served in the Red Army during World War II.

She is remembered as a symbol of Soviet victory in Berlin, Germany after the end of the war. She was known as the "Mistress of the Brandenburg Gate" due to a photo and film of her in Berlin in 1945, where she directed automobile traffic near the Brandenburg Gate with graceful and precise movements.

== World War II ==
Spivak was born in 1925 in the village of Chernihivka, in the Zaporizhizhia region of the Ukrainian SSR where she later graduated from the 9th grade of secondary school.

During the German occupation of her village, Lydia lived for a long time in an underground shelter built by her parents. In September 1943, after the liberation of Chernihivka, against her parents' wishes, she voluntarily joined the Red Army and went to the front. She initially trained as a sniper but was eventually assigned to serve as a traffic controller, where after a short training course, she served in active war zones, including the liberation of Crimea in 1944. She was wounded in one of the battles, but later returned to service and advanced with Soviet forces on the way to Berlin. On May 2, 1945, Lydia took charge of the "No. 1" control point near the Brandenburg Gate in Berlin. At that point, she was photographed by Yakov Ryumkin, a photojournalist for the newspaper Pravda. Her photo was published in many newspapers around the world and made Lydia famous.

Spivak chatting and directing traffic in Berlin, Germany, 1945

In the summer of 1945, she participated in the traffic control of government delegations from the USSR, the US and Great Britain. They came to participate in the Potsdam Conference, which was held in the Cecilienhof Palace. From the convoy of cars carrying representatives of the delegations of the participating countries, British Prime Minister Winston Churchill showed her the famous "V" sign with his fingers.

== Later life ==
After being demobilized from the army in September 1945, Lydia returned to the Soviet Union.

She enrolled at Dnipropetrovsk University. After graduating, she moved to Donetsk, where she worked as a university lecturer specializing in Ukrainian language and literature. There, she met and later married Sergei Ovcharenko, a mathematics lecturer and fellow war veteran who was previously an artilleryman. They had two children: a son, Alexander, and a daughter, Larisa, who later became a journalist.

Lydia also worked at Donetsk secondary school No. 13 as a teacher of Russian and Ukrainian languages, as well as literature.

== Death and legacy ==
Lydia Spivak died from a myocardial infarction on October 13, 1984, at the age of 59. She was buried in a cemetery in Donetsk.

For five years after her death, letters from around the world addressed simply to "The Mistress of the Brandenburg Gate" continued to arrive at her home.

A memorial plaque and exhibition about her life are established at Donetsk National University and Donetsk Secondary School No. 13.

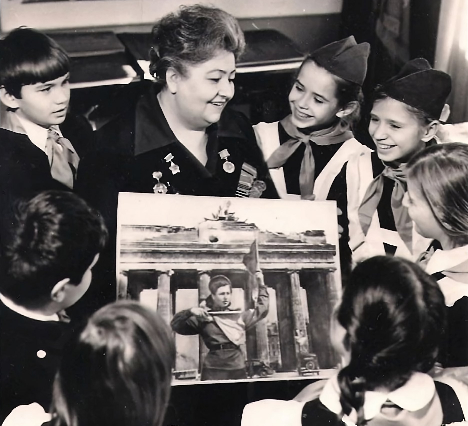
Spivak showing her famous picture to school children in 1956

== Awards ==
She was awarded the medals "For the Capture of Berlin", "For the Liberation of Warsaw", "For the Victory over Germany in the Great Patriotic War of 1941–1945", the "Excellent Road Worker" badge (1943), and other badges for military and labor merits.
