= Yasna Poliana, Kramatorsk Raion, Donetsk Oblast =

Yasna Poliana Ясна Поляна
- Rural settlement
- Location of Yasna Poliana Yasna Poliana (Ukraine)
- Coordinates: 48°44′37″N 37°31′36″E
- Country: Ukraine
- Oblast: Donetsk Oblast
- Raion: Kramatorsk Raion
- Hromada: Kramatorsk urban hromada
- Elevation: 72 m (236 ft)

Population (2022)
  - Total: 2,241
  - Estimate (July 2026): 1,900
- Time zone: UTC+2 (EET)
  - Summer (DST): UTC+3 (EEST)
- Postal code: 84394
- Area code: +380 626

Yasna Poliana (Ukrainian: Ясна Поляна) is a rural settlement in Kramatorsk Raion, Donetsk Oblast, eastern Ukraine. Population: 2,241 (2022 estimate).

== Demographics ==
Native language as of the Ukrainian Census of 2001:

- Ukrainian 69.79%
- Russian 28.62%
- Armenian 0.62%
- Jewish 0.27%
- Moldovan (Romanian) and Romani 0.18%
