= Sofiivka, Kherson Oblast =

Sofiivka Софіївка
- Location of Sofiivka Sofiivka (Ukraine)
- Coordinates: 46°53′51″N 34°5′56″E
- Country: Ukraine
- Oblast: Kherson Oblast
- Raion: Kakhovka Raion
- Hromada: Hornostaivka settlement hromada
- Settlement: 1920

Government
  - Starosta: Mykhailiuk Vitaliy Bohdanovych

Area
  - Total: 18 km^{2} (6.9 sq mi)
- Elevation: 65 m (213 ft)

Population (2001)
  - Total: 25
  - Density: 1.36/km^{2} (3.5/sq mi)
- Postal code: 74360
- Area code: +380 5544

Sofiivka (Ukrainian: Софіївка) is a village in Ukraine, in the Hornostaivka settlement hromada of Kakhovka Raion, Kherson Oblast. The population is 25 people.

== History ==
The village came under Russian occupation in the Russian invasion of Ukraine in February 2022.

== Population ==
The 1989 Ukrainian SSR census gave a population of 47 people, 26 men and 21 women. In the 2001 Ukrainian census, the population was 25 people.

According to the 2001 census, 96% of Sofiivka spoke primarily Ukrainian, and 4% spoke primarily Russian.
