= Yasna Poliana, Zhytomyr Oblast =

Yasna Poliana Ясна Поляна
- Village
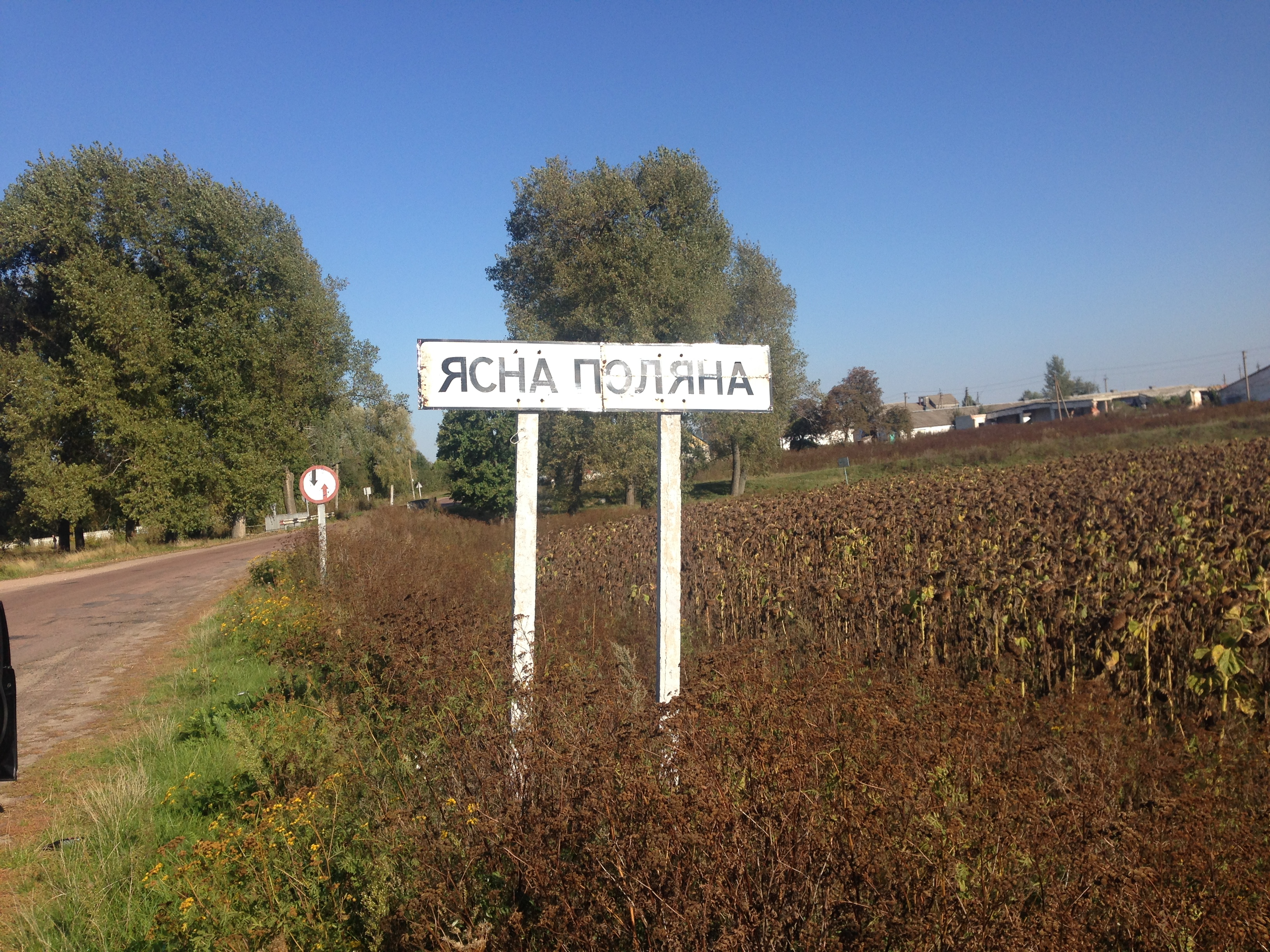

- Location of Yasna Poliana Yasna Poliana (Ukraine)
- Coordinates: 50°30′18″N 28°11′59″E
- Country: Ukraine
- Oblast: Zhytomyr Oblast
- Raion: Zhytomyr Raion
- Hromada: Pulyny settlement hromada
- Elevation: 216 m (709 ft)

Population (2001)
  - Total: 681
- Time zone: UTC+2 (EET)
  - Summer (DST): UTC+3 (EEST)
- Postal code: 12014
- Area code: +380 4131

Yasna Poliana (Ukrainian: Ясна Поляна) is a village in Zhytomyr Raion, Zhytomyr Oblast, Ukraine.

== History ==
Until 18 July 2020, Yasna Poliana was located in Pulyny Raion. The raion was abolished in July 2020 as part of the administrative reform of Ukraine, which reduced the number of raions of Zhytomyr Oblast to four. The area of Pulyny Raion was merged into Zhytomyr Raion.
