= Prymorsk urban hromada =

Prymorsk urban hromada Приморська міська громада
- Hromada
- Interactive map of Prymorsk urban hromada
- Country: Ukraine
- Oblast: Zaporizhzhia Oblast
- Raion: Berdiansk Raion

Area
  - Total: 985.7 km^{2} (380.6 sq mi)

Population (2020)
  - Total: 22,797
  - Density: 23.13/km^{2} (59.90/sq mi)
- Settlements: 20
- Cities: 1
- Rural settlements: 2
- Villages: 17

Prymorsk urban hromada (Ukrainian: Приморська міська громада) is a hromada of Ukraine, located in Berdiansk Raion, Zaporizhzhia Oblast. Its administrative center is the city Prymorsk.

It has an area of 985.7 square kilometres (380.6 mi^{2}) and a population of 22,797, as of 2020.

The hromada contains 20 settlements: 1 city (Prymorsk), 17 villages:

- Komyshuvatka
- Preslav
- Banivka
- Borysivka
- Azov
- Lozanivka
- Viacheslavka
- Marynivka
- Inzivka
- Manuilivka
- Kalynivka
- Petrivka
- Novooleksiivka
- Lozuvatka
- Orlivka
- Rainivka
- Novopavlivka

And 2 rural-type settlements: Naberezhne and Podsporie.

== See also ==
- List of hromadas of Ukraine
