= Sofiivka, Kramatorsk Raion, Donetsk Oblast =

Sofiivka Софіївка
- Rural settlement
- Location of Sofiivka in Donetsk Oblast Sofiivka (Donetsk Oblast)
- Coordinates: 48°44′27″N 37°30′47″E
- Country: Ukraine
- Oblast: Donetsk Oblast
- Raion: Kramatorsk Raion
- Status: 1962

Area
  - Total: 0.43 km^{2} (0.17 sq mi)
- Elevation: 83 m (272 ft)

Population (2001)
  - Total: 912
  - Density: 2,100/km^{2} (5,500/sq mi)
- Time zone: UTC+2 (EET)
  - Summer (DST): UTC+3 (EEST)
- Postal code: 84397
- Area code: +380 6264
- Website: http://rada.gov.ua/

Sofiivka (Ukrainian: Софіївка; Russian: Софиевка) is a rural settlement in Kramatorsk Raion, Donetsk Oblast, eastern Ukraine. Its population was 912 as of the 2001 Ukrainian census. In 2022 it was estimated at 895.

Sofiivka was designated as an urban-type settlement in 1962. It is located in the northern portion of the oblast, west of Kramatorsk, at an elevation of 83 m (272 ft). The settlement belongs to the Shabelkivka Settlement Council, as part of the local government scheme in Ukraine.

In the 2001 census 61.95 percent of Sofiivka's population said Ukrainian was their native language, and 38.05% said Russian was.
