= Deportation of Soviet citizens for forced labour to Germany =

Form of German economic exploitation in World War II

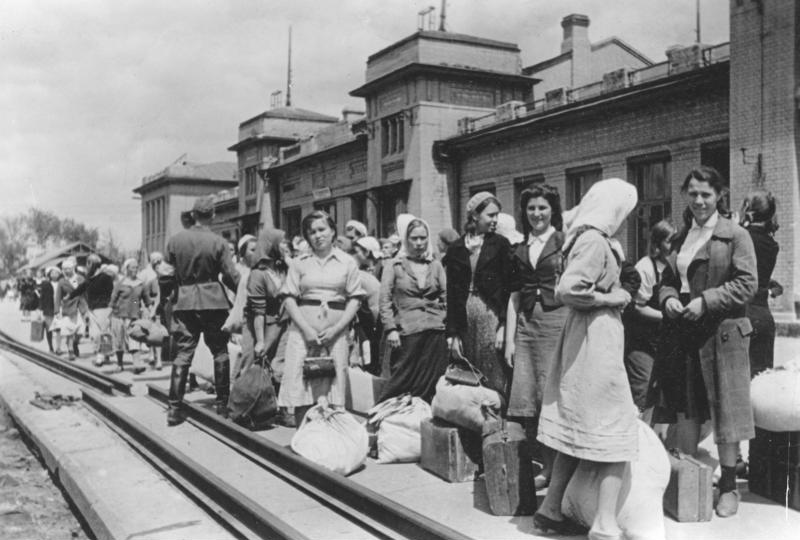
Workers leaving for Germany in 1942

Deportation of Soviet citizens for forced labour to Germany was the forcible export of citizens of the USSR (mainly from the territory of Ukraine and Belarus) to forced labor in Germany, as well as to Austria, France (Alsace-Lorraine) and the Czech Republic (Protectorate of Bohemia and Moravia). It was carried out by the German occupation authorities in the period from 1942 to 1944. In November 1941, after the German top leadership realized the failure of the blitzkrieg, they were instructed to use "Russian labor force" in Germany. In January 1942, the German leaders gave orders to take 15 million workers from occupied areas in the USSR to Germany for forced labor.

== Purpose ==
At first, the Germans were not going to attract large numbers of labor from the occupied Soviet territories, fearing that the presence of Soviet citizens in the Third Reich would have a corrupting ideological effect on its inhabitants. The mass sending of people to Germany began in the spring of 1942, when, after the failure of the 1941 blitzkrieg, there was a noticeable shortage of workers. The Germans themselves called the hijacking of the Soviet population recruitment, and until April 1942, mostly volunteers were actually sent to work in Germany.

The occupation authorities launched a broad propaganda campaign, promising people a happy life in the Third Reich, decent pay and decent working conditions. Some believed these messages and came to the recruitment points themselves, fleeing from devastation, hunger and unemployment. But there were few of them, and they quickly realized that they had been deceived. The vast majority of ostarbeiters were forcibly sent to Germany. Using the army and local police, the Germans organized raids and hijacked hundreds of thousands of Soviet people to Germany.

According to German information, in February 1942, 8-10 thousand "civilian Russians" were sent to Germany weekly. In general, about 5 million people were taken out of the occupied territories of the USSR for forced labor, 2.4 million of them from the territory of the Ukrainian SSR, 400 thousand people from the territory of the BSSR. The Germans called them "ostarbeiters" (Eastern workers). In accordance with the state instructions of the German authorities, it was stipulated that "all workers should receive such food and such housing and be treated in such a way that would make it possible to exploit them to the greatest extent at the lowest cost." The death rate among the Soviet people who were abducted to Germany was very high. The overwhelming majority of the total number of those taken out for forced labor were teenagers.

== Opposition to the Germans ==
Partisans played a huge role in saving Soviet people from being hijacked to Germany. Tens and hundreds of thousands of Soviet citizens were under their protection in the forests in the so-called forest camps. The partisans of the Leningrad Region disrupted the shipment of over 400 thousand people to Germany. In the territory of the Minsk region, 567 thousand civilians were rescued by partisans in 2 years. Part of the population from the occupied territories was transported across the front line to the Soviet rear, more than 40 thousand civilians were returned from the territory of Belarus alone. After the entry of Soviet troops into the territory of Germany, the liberation and return of Soviet people to their homeland began. Of the total number of Soviet citizens who found themselves outside the USSR (including prisoners of war), 6,800,000 people, after the end of the war, 4,500,000 people were repatriated to their homeland. 500,000 people did not return for various reasons and became emigrants. The remaining 1.8 million people died or died in captivity.

== Repression after the war ==
Many ostarbeiters turned out to be in the western part of Germany, where the main industry of the Third Reich was concentrated, so they were released by the British and Americans. Many of the Soviet citizens abducted by the Germans, not without reason fearing reprisals, chose to stay in the West (in various studies, the number of "non-returnees" varies from 285,000 to 451,000 people). At the same time, the Yalta Agreements stipulated that all citizens of the USSR who found themselves outside during the war were subject to mandatory repatriation, regardless of their desire. In October 1944, the Department of the Authorized Council of People's Commissars of the USSR for the Repatriation of Soviet citizens from Germany and the countries occupied by it was established, which was engaged in the return to their homeland of millions of Soviet citizens taken out during the German occupation to forced labor in the Third Reich. All the repatriates had to go through Soviet filtration camps, where they were interrogated by NKVD and SMERSH officers. Those who were accused of collaborating with the Nazis were sent to the gulag (mostly men). Men of military age were sent to the active army or, for example, to restore mines in the destroyed Donbas. Many young girls after filtration were sent to the subsidiary farms of the military units of the Red Army. The rest went home. For a long time, "repatriates" were one of the disadvantaged categories of citizens that the Soviet state treated with suspicion. It was difficult for them to enter a job or educational institutions. The "repatriates" were not paid any compensation for free labor and moral damage during the war years due to the fact that the Soviet Union in 1953 refused reparations claims to the GDR.
