= Shabelkivka =

Shabelkivka Шабельківка
- Rural settlement
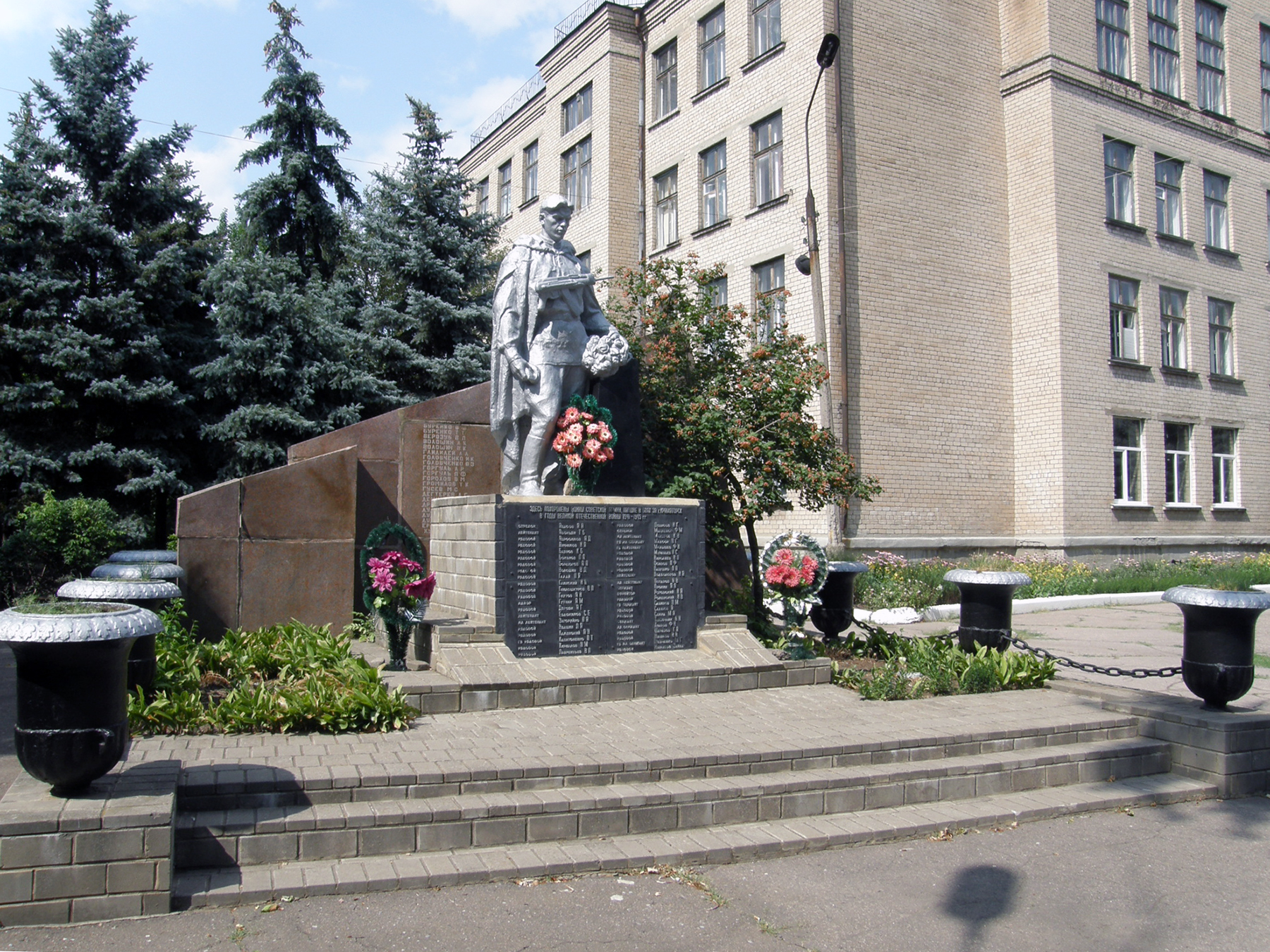

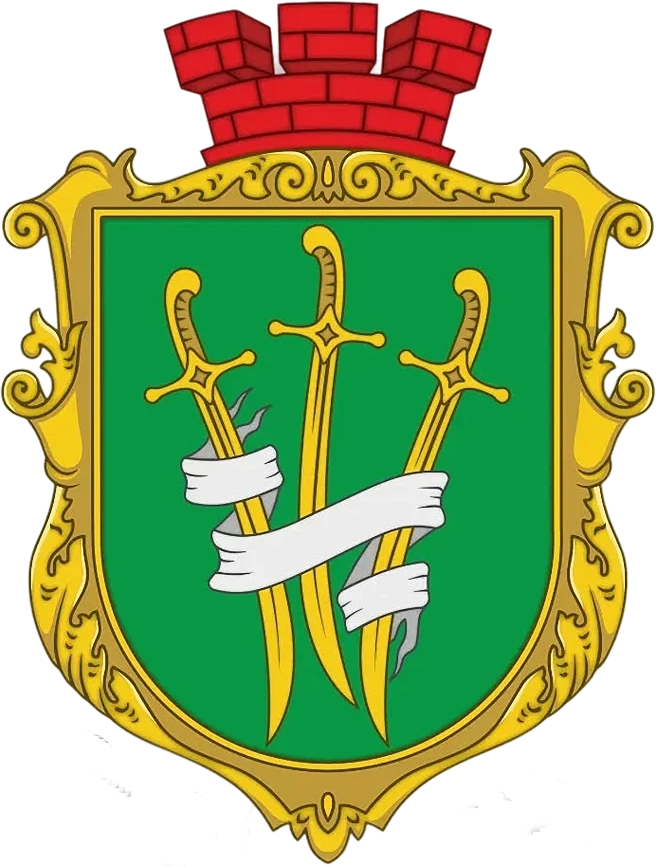
- Coat of arms

- Location of Shabelkivka Shabelkivka (Ukraine)
- Coordinates: 48°45′39″N 37°29′17″E
- Country: Ukraine
- Oblast: Donetsk Oblast
- Raion: Kramatorsk Raion
- Hromada: Kramatorsk urban hromada
- Founded: 1758
- Elevation: 117 m (384 ft)

Population (2022)
  - Total: 4,144
- Time zone: UTC+2 (EET)
  - Summer (DST): UTC+3 (EEST)
- Postal code: 84393
- Area code: +380 626

Shabelkivka (Ukrainian: Шабельківка) is a rural settlement in Kramatorsk Raion, Donetsk Oblast, eastern Ukraine. Population: 4,144 (2022 estimate).

== Demographics ==
Native language as of the Ukrainian Census of 2001:

- Ukrainian 48.42%
- Russian 50.32%
- Armenian 0.07%
- Belarusian 0.02%
