= Sofiivka, Sofiivka rural hromada, Berdiansk Raion, Zaporizhzhia Oblast =

Coordinates: 46°54′15″N 36°19′32″E

Sofiivka (Ukrainian: Софіївка) is a village in Berdiansk Raion, Zaporizhzhia Oblast, Ukraine. It is the administrative center of Sofiivka rural hromada, one of the hromadas of Ukraine.

== History ==
The village was founded in 1862 on the site of the former Togaly Nogai settlement by Bulgarians who had come from the Bessarabia region. Its original name was Romanivka (Ukrainian: Романівка). In 1926, its name was changed by the Soviet government to Kolarivka (Ukrainian: Коларівка) in honor of Bulgarian communist leader Vasil Kolarov. From 1925 to 1939, it was the center of Kolarivka Raion (known until 1926 as Romanivka Raion), one of the national raions of the Ukrainian SSR.

During World War II, Kolarivka was occupied by Nazi Germany before being liberated by the Red Army in autumn 1943.

In 2016, as part of decommunization in Ukraine, its name was changed to Bolharka (Ukrainian: Болгарка). On 12 June 2020, Bolharka became the center of Kolarivka rural hromada, one of the hromadas of Ukraine, in accordance with an edict of the Verkhovna Rada of Ukraine that was part of decentralization reforms. On October 7, 2021, its name was changed to the current one by another edict of the Verkhovna Rada.
