= Chernihivka Raion =

Former subdivision of Zaporizhzhia Oblast, Ukraine

Chernihivka Raion Чернігівський район
- Raion
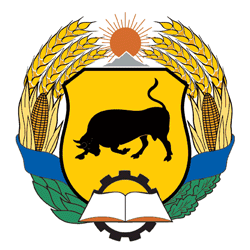
- Flag Coat of arms

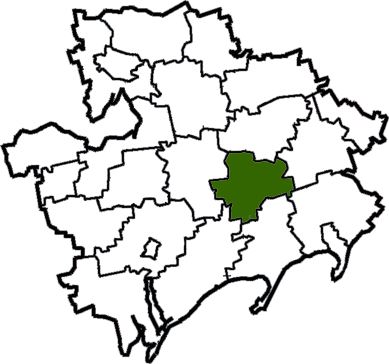
- Coordinates: 47°11′31.74″N 36°12′51.14″E
- Country: Ukraine
- Oblast: Zaporizhzhia Oblast
- Established: 1923
- Disestablished: 18 July 2020
- Admin. center: Chernihivka
- Subdivisions: List: 0 — city councils; 1 — settlement councils; 11 — rural councils; Number of localities: 0 — cities; 1 — urban-type settlements; 35 — villages; — rural settlements

Government
  - Governor: Oleksandr Lysnyak

Area
  - Total: 1,200 km^{2} (460 sq mi)

Population (2020)
  - Total: 16,145 ▼
  - Density: 13/km^{2} (35/sq mi)
- Time zone: UTC+02:00 (EET)
  - Summer (DST): UTC+03:00 (EEST)
- Postal index: 71200—71245
- Area code: +380 6140
- Website: http://radachernigivka.at.ua

Chernihivka Raion (Ukrainian: Чернігівський район) was one of raions (districts) of Zaporizhzhia Oblast in southern Ukraine. The administrative center of the region was the urban-type settlement of Chernihivka. The raion was abolished on 18 July 2020 as part of the administrative reform of Ukraine, which reduced the number of raions of Zaporizhzhia Oblast to five. The area of Chernihivka Raion was merged into Berdiansk Raion. The last estimate of the raion population was 16,145 (2020 est.).
