= Berdiansk Raion =

Subdivision of Zaporizhzhia Oblast, Ukraine

Berdiansk Raion Бердянський район
- Raion
- Berdianskyi Raion
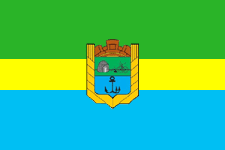
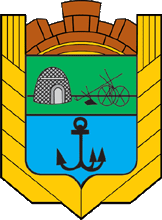
- Flag Coat of arms

- Interactive map of Berdiansk Raion
- Coordinates: 44°30′0.15″N 33°36′0.12″E
- Country: Ukraine
- Oblast: Zaporizhzhia Oblast
- Established: 1923
- Admin. center: Berdiansk
- Subdivisions: 8 hromadas

Government
  - Governor: Volodymyr Chepurnyi

Area
  - Total: 4,461.56 km^{2} (1,722.62 sq mi)

Population (2022)
  - Total: 176,046
  - Density: 39.4584/km^{2} (102.197/sq mi)
- Time zone: UTC+02:00 (EET)
  - Summer (DST): UTC+03:00 (EEST)
- Postal index: 71128—71170
- Area code: +380 6153
- Website: http://www.berda.gov.ua (Ukrainian administration) https://berdokrug.gosuslugi.ru/ (Russian administration)

Berdiansk Raion, also spelled Berdyansk Raion (Ukrainian: Бердянський район) is one of the five raions (districts) of Zaporizhzhia Oblast in southern Ukraine. The administrative center of the region is Berdiansk. The raion has access to the northern coast of the Sea of Azov. The population is 176,046 (2022 estimate).

During the Russian invasion of Ukraine, the raion has been occupied by Russia.

== Geography ==
Berdyansk district is located on the Black Sea coast, on the Black Sea Lowland and the Azov Upland.

Typical landscapes for Berdyansk district are steppes on chernozems. There are salt marshes. Steppe vegetation, due to plowing, has been preserved mainly on the slopes of river valleys and gullies.

The Obitochna and Berda rivers flow through Berdyansk district.

The climate of the district is temperate continental with dry periods, but there is a softening of the climate due to the proximity to the Sea of Azov. According to the Köppen-Geiger climate classification, the climate of the Berdyansk district is humid continental with hot summers (Dfa).

== History ==
From 1923 to 1925, it was known Novospasivka Raion (Ukrainian: Новоспасівський район), after its then-center Novospasivka (now Osypenko, Zaporizhzhia Oblast). In 1925, the administrative center was moved to Berdiansk, and it was renamed Berdiansk Raion.

From 1939 to 1958, it was known as Osypenko Raion (Ukrainian: Осипенківський район). During World War II, Osypenko Raion was occupied by Nazi Germany between October 1941 and September 1943. 3,260 people from Osypenko Raion were deported to Germany for forced labor and 300 were murdered.

The January 2020 estimate of the raion population was 24,274 (2020 est.). On 18 July 2020, as part of the administrative reform of Ukraine, the number of raions of Zaporizhzhia Oblast was reduced to five, and the area of Berdiansk Raion was significantly expanded by absorbing Prymorsk Raion and parts of Chernihivka Raion and Bilmak Raions, as well as the city of Berdiansk, which was previously incorporated as a city of Oblast significance.

== Demographics ==
As of the 2001 Ukrainian census, the raion (excluding Berdiansk itself, which was then designated a city of oblast significance) had a population of 31,631 people. In terms of self-reported ethnic background, 73% were Ukrainians and 17% were Russians, with small minorities of Belarusians, Bulgarians, and Greeks.

Population history
Year	1970	2001	2016	2020	2022
Pop.	43,900	31,631	25,483	24,274	176,046
±% p.a.	—	−1.05%	−1.43%	−1.21%	+169.30%

== Bibliography ==
- Національний атлас України/НАН України, Інститут географії, Державна служба геодезії, картографії та кадастру; голов. ред. Л. Г. Руденко; голова ред. кол.Б.Є. Патон. — К.: ДНВП «Картографія», 2007. — 435 с. — 5 тис.прим. — ISBN 978-966-475-067-4.
- Географічна енциклопедія України : [у 3 т.] / редкол.: О. М. Маринич (відповід. ред.) та ін. — К., 1989—1993. — 33 000 екз. — ISBN 5-88500-015-8.
