= Friedensburh =

Abandoned village in Zaporizhzhia Oblast, Ukraine

Friedensburh Фріденсбург
- Abandoned village
- Location within Zaporizhzhia Oblast Location within Ukraine
- Coordinates: 47°07′11″N 35°36′21″E
- Country: Ukraine
- Oblast: Zaporizhzhia Oblast
- Raion: Polohy Raion
- Hromada: Molochansk urban hromada
- Established: 1926

Area
  - Total: 0.33 km^{2} (0.13 sq mi)

Population (2026)
  - Total: 0
  - Density: 0.0/km^{2} (0.0/sq mi)
- Postal code: 71771

Friedensburh (Ukrainian: Фріденсбург) is an abandoned village in Polohy Raion, Zaporizhzhia Oblast, Ukraine. Administratively, it is part of Molochansk urban hromada. In 2026 its population was 0.

== Geography ==
Friedensburh is located 8 kilometres south of Molochansk, 4 kilometres northwest of Kuroshany, 5 kilometres southeast of Rybalivka, 4.5 kilometres southeast of Dolyna, and 6.5 kilometres northwest of Novomykolaivka.

== History ==
Friedensburh was founded in 1926 by Volhynian Germans, but was abandoned after World War II.

The abandoned village became part of the Molochansk urban hromada on June 12, 2020, following the abolition of the Novomykolaivka Rural Council and the Novomykolaivka Rural Hromada.

The abandoned village became part of Polohy Raion on July 19, 2020, following the abolition of Tokmak Raion.

The abandoned village has been occupied by Russia since early 2022.

== Demographics ==
The population of the village is 0.
