= Malakhivka =

Abandoned Village in Zaporizhzhia Oblast, Ukraine

Malakhivka Малахівка
- Abandoned Village
- Location within Zaporizhzhia Oblast Location within Ukraine
- Coordinates: 47°02′26″N 35°51′28″E
- Country: Ukraine
- Oblast: Zaporizhzhia Oblast
- Raion: Polohy Raion
- Hromada: Molochansk urban hromada
- Established: 1857

Area
  - Total: 0.12 km^{2} (0.046 sq mi)
- Elevation: 54 m (177 ft)

Population (2026)
  - Total: 0
  - Density: 0.0/km^{2} (0.0/sq mi)
- Postal code: 71775

Malakhivka (Ukrainian: Малахівка), formerly Friedensruh (Ukrainian: Фріденсруе) is an abandoned village in Polohy Raion, Zaporizhzhia Oblast, Ukraine. Administratively, it is part of Molochansk urban hromada. In 2026 its population was 0.

== Geography ==
The abandoned village is located on the banks of the Yushanly River. The former village is 25 kilometres southeast of Molochansk, 1.8 kilometres southeast of Hrushivka, 9.7 kilometres east of Lahidne, and adjacent to Udarnyk.

== History ==
Malakhivka was founded in 1857 as Friedensruh as part of the Molotschna Colony by settlers from nearby villages.

There was a school in the village. In 1869, the village had 28 farms and 24 smallholdings, a windmill, and a brickyard.

The village was renamed to Malakhivka in 1945 and annexed into Udarnyk in the 1950s.

The former village became part of the Molochansk urban hromada on June 12, 2020, following the abolition of the Lahidne Rural Council.

The former village became part of Polohy Raion on July 19, 2020, following the abolition of Tokmak Raion.

The former village has been occupied by Russia since March 2022.

== Demographics ==
The population of the former village is 0
