= Veinavskyi =

Village in Zaporizhzhia Oblast, Ukraine

Veinavskyi Вейнавский
- Village
- Location within Zaporizhzhia Oblast Location within Ukraine
- Coordinates: 47°09′52″N 35°31′15″E
- Country: Ukraine
- Oblast: Zaporizhzhia Oblast
- Raion: Polohy Raion
- Hromada: Molochansk urban hromada

Area
  - Total: 0.07 km^{2} (0.027 sq mi)
- Postal code: 71761

Veinavskyi (Ukrainian: Вейнавский) is a village in Polohy Raion, Zaporizhzhia Oblast, Ukraine. Administratively, it is part of Molochansk urban hromada. The village is part of Blahodatne.

== Geography ==
The village is located near the banks of the Molochna River. The village is 6 kilometres southwest of Molochansk, 4 kilometres southwest of Vynohradne, and 3 kilometres northwest of Dolyna.

== History ==
Veinavskyi is shown on the Schubert's Map of 1860 and 1872, as well as a Red Army 1941 map.

The village was part of the German defensive line Wotan in Autumn 1943.

The village was merged into Blahodatne.

The village was part of the Dolyna Rural Council until 1993 when it became part of the Vynohradne Rural Council.

The village became part of the Molochansk urban hromada on June 12, 2020, following the abolition of the Vynohradne Rural Council.

The village became part of Polohy Raion on July 19, 2020, following the abolition of Tokmak Raion.

The village has been occupied by Russia since early 2022.
