= Durlach, Ukraine =

Abandoned village in Zaporizhzhia Oblast, Ukraine

Durlach Дурлах
- Abandoned Village
- Location within Zaporizhzhia Oblast Location within Ukraine
- Coordinates: 47°09′11″N 35°30′58″E
- Country: Ukraine
- Oblast: Zaporizhzhia Oblast
- Raion: Polohy Raion
- Hromada: Molochansk urban hromada

Area
  - Total: 0.02 km^{2} (0.0077 sq mi)

Population (2026)
  - Total: 0
  - Density: 0.0/km^{2} (0.0/sq mi)
- Postal code: 71761

Durlach (Ukrainian: Дурлах) is an abandoned village in Polohy Raion, Zaporizhzhia Oblast, Ukraine. Administratively, it is part of Molochansk urban hromada. In 2026 its population was 0.

== Geography ==
The abandoned village is located near the banks of the Molochna River. The village is 7.5 kilometres southwest of Molochansk, 5 kilometres southwest of Vynohradne, and 3 kilometres northwest of Dolyna.

== History ==
Durlach is shown on the Schubert's Maps of 1860 and 1872.

The village was part of the German defensive line Wotan in Autumn 1943.

Durlach was abandoned after World War II.

The abandoned village was part of the Dolyna Rural Council until 1993 when it became part of the Vynohradne Rural Council.

The abandoned village became part of the Molochansk urban hromada on June 12, 2020, following the abolition of the Vynohradne Rural Council.

The abandoned village became part of Polohy Raion on July 19, 2020, following the abolition of Tokmak Raion.

The abandoned village has been occupied by Russia since early 2022.

== Demographics ==
The abandoned village has a population of 0.
