= Svitle, Zaporizhzhia Oblast =

Village in Zaporizhzhia Oblast, Ukraine

Svitle Світле
- Village
- Location within Zaporizhzhia Oblast Location within Ukraine
- Coordinates: 47°8′55″N 35°50′13″E
- Country: Ukraine
- Oblast: Zaporizhzhia Oblast
- Raion: Polohy Raion
- Hromada: Molochansk urban hromada
- Established: 1820

Area
  - Total: 0.76 km^{2} (0.29 sq mi)
- Elevation: 56 m (184 ft)

Population (2001)
  - Total: 282
  - Density: 370/km^{2} (960/sq mi)
- Postal code: 71772

Svitle (Ukrainian: Світле), formerly Alexanderwohl (Ukrainian: Александрволь) and Oleksandrivka (Ukrainian: Олександрівка) is a village in Polohy Raion, Zaporizhzhia Oblast, Ukraine. Administratively, it is part of Molochansk urban hromada. In 2001 its population was 282.

== Geography ==
The village is located on the banks of the Behym-Chokrak River. The village is 16 kilometres southeast of Molochansk, 500 metres northeast of Balkove, and 8 kilometres northeast of Novomykolaivka.

== History ==
Svitle was founded in 1820 as Alexanderwohl by 22 Mennonite families from West Prussia. The village was named after Alexander I of Russia, who the settlers met en route here. 15 farms were built here, as well as two windmills and a grocery store.

In 1869, there were 35 farms and 26 smallholdings. All the residents left the village and moved to Kansas in 1874, so the village was resettled by families from other villages in the Molotschna Colony.

The village was renamed to Oleksandrivka in 1945, and was renamed to Svitle in 1963.

The village became part of Molochansk urban hromada on June 12, 2020 following the abolition of the Balkove Rural Council and the Novomykolaivka Rural Hromada.

The village became part of Polohy Raion on July 19, 2020, following the abolition of Tokmak Raion.

The village has been occupied by Russia since March 2022.

== Monuments ==
- A Mennonite Church was built in 1865, and is now ruined.
- The old Mennonite village school
- The old Mennonite pharmacy. Brick.

== Demographics ==
According to the 2001 Ukrainian census, there were 282 residents of the village with 98% spoke Ukrainian and 1% spoke Russian..
