= Neuheim, Ukraine =

Abandoned village in Zaporizhzhia Oblast, Ukraine

Neuheim Нейгейм
- Abandoned village
- Location within Zaporizhzhia Oblast Location within Ukraine
- Coordinates: 47°10′36″N 35°39′29″E
- Country: Ukraine
- Oblast: Zaporizhzhia Oblast
- Raion: Polohy Raion
- Hromada: Molochansk urban hromada
- Established: 1924

Area
  - Total: 0.72 km^{2} (0.28 sq mi)

Population (2026)
  - Total: 0
  - Density: 0.0/km^{2} (0.0/sq mi)
- Postal code: 71770

Neuheim (Ukrainian: Нейгейм) is an abandoned village in Polohy Raion, Zaporizhzhia Oblast, Ukraine. Administratively, it is part of Molochansk urban hromada. In 2026 its population was 0.

== Geography ==
Neuheim is located 4 kilometres southeast of Molochansk, 3 kilometres northwest of Ukrainka, and 8 kilometres northwest of Novomykolaivka.

== History ==
Neuheim was founded in the 1924, but was abandoned after the World War II.

The abandoned village became part of the Molochansk urban hromada on June 12, 2020, following the abolition of the Novomykolaivka Rural Council and the Novomykolaivka Rural Hromada.

The abandoned village became part of Polohy Raion on July 19, 2020, following the abolition of Tokmak Raion.

The abandoned village has been occupied by Russia since early 2022.

== Demographics ==
The population of the village is 0.
