= Prangenau =

Abandoned Village in Zaporizhzhia Oblast, Ukraine

Prangenau Прангенау
- Abandoned Village
- Location within Zaporizhzhia Oblast Location within Ukraine
- Coordinates: 47°2′46″N 35°53′52″E
- Country: Ukraine
- Oblast: Zaporizhzhia Oblast
- Raion: Polohy Raion
- Hromada: Molochansk urban hromada
- Established: 1824

Area
  - Total: 0.02 km^{2} (0.0077 sq mi)

Population (2026)
  - Total: 0
  - Density: 0.0/km^{2} (0.0/sq mi)
- Postal code: 71775

Prangenau (Ukrainian: Прангенау) is an abandoned village in Polohy Raion, Zaporizhzhia Oblast, Ukraine. Administratively, it is part of Molochansk urban hromada. In 2026 its population was 0.

== Geography ==
The abandoned village is located on the banks of the Yushanly River. The former village is 27 kilometres southeast of Molochansk, 13 kilometres east of Lahidne, and 1.5 kilometres southeast of Udarnyk.

== History ==
Prangenau was founded in Spring 1824 as part of the Molotschna Colony by 23 families from West Prussia and the Chortitza Colony.

In 1869, the village had 24 farms and 33 smallholdings, a general store, a windmill, and a brickyard.

The Mennonite residents moved to Germany in 1943 and the village was left abandoned.

The former village became part of the Molochansk urban hromada on June 12, 2020, following the abolition of the Lahidne Rural Council.

The former village became part of Polohy Raion on July 19, 2020, following the abolition of Tokmak Raion.

The former village has been occupied by Russia since March 2022.

== Demographics ==
The population of the village in 1908 was 568.

The population of the former village in 2026 is 0
