= Yefymivna =

Village in Zaporizhzhia Oblast, Ukraine

Yefymivna Єфимівна
- Village
- Location within Zaporizhzhia Oblast Location within Ukraine
- Coordinates: 47°06′37″N 35°41′57″E
- Country: Ukraine
- Oblast: Zaporizhzhia Oblast
- Raion: Polohy Raion
- Hromada: Molochansk urban hromada

Area
  - Total: 0.25 km^{2} (0.097 sq mi)
- Postal code: 71771

Yefymivna (Ukrainian: Єфимівна) is a village in Polohy Raion, Zaporizhzhia Oblast, Ukraine. Administratively, it is part of Molochansk urban hromada.

== Geography ==
The village is located on the banks of the Kuroshany River. The village is 11 kilometres southeast of Molochansk, 850 metres away northeast of Kuroshany and adjacent to Hroznyi.

== History ==
Yefymivna was founded in the early 20th century but was later incorporated into Novomykolaivka.

The village became part of the Molochansk urban hromada on June 12, 2020, following the abolition of the Novomykolaivka Rural Council and the Novomykolaivka Rural Hromada.

The village became part of Polohy Raion on July 19, 2020, following the abolition of Tokmak Raion.

The village has been occupied by Russia since early 2022.
