= Hryshyne, Zaporizhzhia Oblast =

Village in Zaporizhzhia Oblast, Ukraine

Hryshyne Гришине
- Village
- Location within Zaporizhzhia Oblast Location within Ukraine
- Coordinates: 47°6′48″N 35°50′18″E
- Country: Ukraine
- Oblast: Zaporizhzhia Oblast
- Raion: Polohy Raion
- Hromada: Molochansk urban hromada
- Established: 1921

Area
  - Total: 0.089 km^{2} (0.034 sq mi)
- Elevation: 55 m (180 ft)

Population (2001)
  - Total: 191
  - Density: 2,100/km^{2} (5,600/sq mi)
- Postal code: 71773

Hryshyne (Ukrainian: Гришине) is a village in Polohy Raion, Zaporizhzhia Oblast, Ukraine. Administratively, it is part of Molochansk urban hromada. In 2001 its population was 191.

== Geography ==
The village is located on the banks of the Kuroshany River. The village is 19 kilometres southeast of Molochansk, 1.7 kilometres southeast of Balkove, and 7 kilometres east of Novomykolaivka.

== History ==
Hryshyne was founded in 1921.

The village became part of Molochansk urban hromada on June 12, 2020 following the abolition of the Balkove Rural Council and the Novomykolaivka Rural Hromada.

The village became part of Polohy Raion on July 19, 2020, following the abolition of Tokmak Raion.

The village has been occupied by Russia since March 2022.

== Demographics ==
According to the 2001 Ukrainian census, there were 282 residents of the village with 86% spoke Ukrainian and 13% spoke Russian..
