= Blahodatne, Zaporizhzhia Oblast =

Village in Zaporizhzhia Oblast, Ukraine

Blahodatne Благодатне
- Village
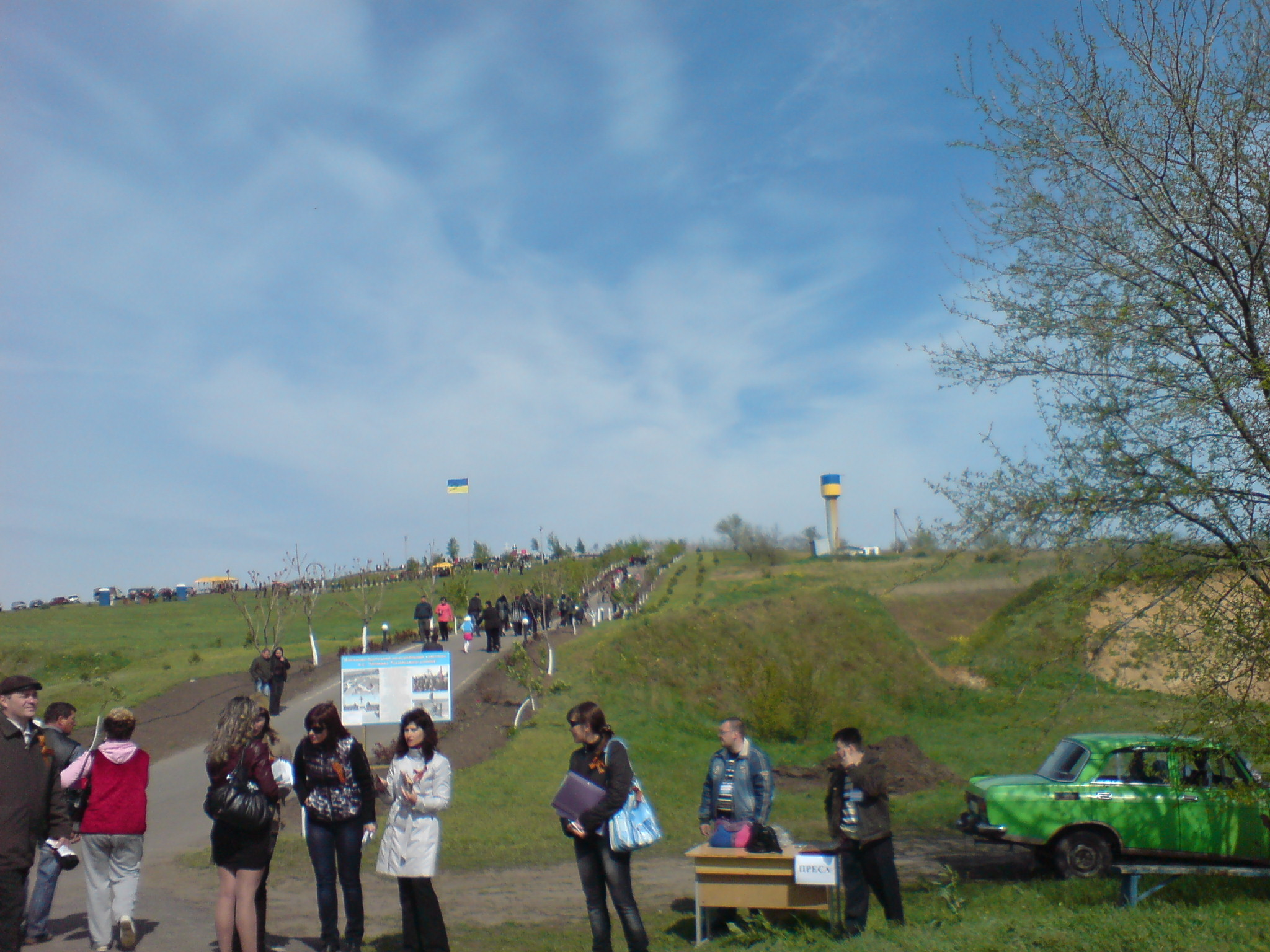
- Military Brotherhood Memorial

- Location within Zaporizhzhia Oblast Location within Ukraine
- Coordinates: 47°10′8″N 35°31′33″E
- Country: Ukraine
- Oblast: Zaporizhzhia Oblast
- Raion: Polohy Raion
- Hromada: Molochansk urban hromada
- Established: 1804

Area
  - Total: 0.737 km^{2} (0.285 sq mi)
- Elevation: 33 m (108 ft)

Population (2001)
  - Total: 183
  - Density: 248/km^{2} (643/sq mi)
- Postal code: 71761

Blahodatne (Ukrainian: Благодатне), formerly Weinau (Ukrainian: Вейнау) and Chapayevka (Ukrainian: Чапаєвка) is a village in Polohy Raion, Zaporizhzhia Oblast, Ukraine. Administratively, it is part of Molochansk urban hromada. In 2001 its population was 183.

== Geography ==
The village is located near the banks of the Molochna River. The village is 5 kilometres southwest of Molochansk, 2 kilometres southwest of Vynohradne, and 3 kilometres northwest of Dolyna.

== History ==
Vynohradne was founded as Weinau in 1804 by 37 German Lutheran families from Prussia, who moved there in 1802 from Stuttgart. 12 more families arrived in to Weinau in 1810 from Karlsruhe.

The village had 2,160 acres of land in 1857, and by 1910 there was a factory of agricultural machinery of H. and G. Zener, 2 windmills, a brickworks, a carpentry workshop, and a school.

The village was part of the German defensive line Wotan in Autumn 1943.

The village was renamed to Chapayevka in 1945 in honour of Vasily Chapayev.

The village of Veinavskyi was merged into Blahodatne.

The village was part of the Dolyna Rural Council until 1993 when it became part of the Vynohradne Rural Council.

The village was renamed to Blahodatne in 2016 due to Decommunization.

The village became part of the Molochansk urban hromada on June 12, 2020, following the abolition of the Vynohradne Rural Council.

The village became part of Polohy Raion on July 19, 2020, following the abolition of Tokmak Raion.

The village has been occupied by Russia since early 2022.

== Monuments ==
The Military Brotherhood Memorial was built in Blahodatne in 2005 to remember those who died in the battles for the Wotan defensive line in 1943. Remains of 500 soldiers who died during World War II are buried here.

There is also a memorial to 32 teenage girls buried here who were part of a Penal military unit and shot here by the Nazis in September 1943.

== Demographics ==
- 1804 - 131
- 1818 - 203
- 1838 - 344
- 1848 - 373
- 1858 - 511
- 1864 - 550
- 1886 - 686
- 1896 - 417
- 1905 - 315
- 1911 - 486
- 1915 - 567
- 1919 - 405
- 1926 - 469
- 1939 - 460

In 1926, 457 residents of the village were German.

According to the 2001 Ukrainian census, there were 183 residents with 87% speaking Ukrainian and 12% speaking Russian.
