= Pryshyb, Polohy Raion, Zaporizhzhia Oblast =

Village in Zaporizhzhia Oblast, Ukraine

Pryshyb Пришиб
- Village
- Location within Zaporizhzhia Oblast Location within Ukraine
- Coordinates: 47°13′31″N 35°34′53″E
- Country: Ukraine
- Oblast: Zaporizhzhia Oblast
- Raion: Polohy Raion
- Hromada: Molochansk urban hromada

Area
  - Total: 0.58 km^{2} (0.22 sq mi)
- Postal code: 71716

Pryshyb (Ukrainian: Пришиб) is a village in Polohy Raion, Zaporizhzhia Oblast, Ukraine. Administratively, it is part of Molochansk urban hromada.

== Geography ==
The village is located near the banks of the Molochna River. The village is adjacent to Hoffental, and 900 metres north of Molochansk.

== History ==
Pryshyb is shown on the Schubert's Map of 1860 and 1872, as well as a Red Army 1941 map.

The village was part of the German defensive line Wotan in Autumn 1943.

The village became part of the Molochansk urban hromada on June 12, 2020, before that it was part of Molochansk City Council.

The village became part of Polohy Raion on July 19, 2020, following the abolition of Tokmak Raion.

The village has been occupied by Russia since early 2022.
