= Hroznyi =

Village in Zaporizhzhia Oblast, Ukraine

Hroznyi Грозний
- Village
- Location within Zaporizhzhia Oblast Location within Ukraine
- Coordinates: 47°06′35″N 35°43′23″E
- Country: Ukraine
- Oblast: Zaporizhzhia Oblast
- Raion: Polohy Raion
- Hromada: Molochansk urban hromada

Area
  - Total: 0.23 km^{2} (0.089 sq mi)
- Postal code: 71771

Hroznyi (Ukrainian: Грозний) is a village in Polohy Raion, Zaporizhzhia Oblast, Ukraine. Administratively, it is part of Molochansk urban hromada.

== Geography ==
The village is located on the banks of the Kuroshany River. The village is 12 kilometres southeast of Molochansk, 500 metres away from Mostove and adjacent to Yefymivna.

== History ==
Hroznyi was founded in the early 20th century but was later incorporated into Novomykolaivka.

The village became part of the Molochansk urban hromada on June 12, 2020, following the abolition of the Novomykolaivka Rural Council and the Novomykolaivka Rural Hromada.

The village became part of Polohy Raion on July 19, 2020, following the abolition of Tokmak Raion.

The village has been occupied by Russia since early 2022.
