= Novohradivka =

Abandoned Village in Zaporizhzhia Oblast, Ukraine

Novohradivka Новоградівка
- Abandoned Village
- Location within Zaporizhzhia Oblast Location within Ukraine
- Coordinates: 46°59′20″N 35°42′2″E
- Country: Ukraine
- Oblast: Zaporizhzhia Oblast
- Raion: Polohy Raion
- Hromada: Molochansk urban hromada

Population (2026)
  - Total: 0
- Postal code: 71774

Novohradivka (Ukrainian: Новоградівка) is an abandoned village in Polohy Raion, Zaporizhzhia Oblast, Ukraine. Administratively, it is part of Molochansk urban hromada. In 2026 its population was 0.

== Geography ==
The abandoned village was located 23 kilometres southeast of Molochansk, 3 kilometres south of Zoriane, and 6 kilometres southwest of Mohutnie.

== History ==
Novohradivka was founded in the early 20th century, but was abandoned during the mid 20th century.

The abandoned village became part of the Molochansk urban hromada on June 12, 2020, following the abolition of the Lahidne Rural Council.

The abandoned village became part of Polohy Raion on July 19, 2020, following the abolition of Tokmak Raion.

The abandoned village has been occupied by Russia since March 2022.

== Demographics ==
The village has a population of 0.
