= Zaporizhzhia, Polohy Raion, Zaporizhzhia Oblast =

Village in Zaporizhzhia Oblast, Ukraine

Zaporizhzhia Запоріжжя
- Village
- Location within Zaporizhzhia Oblast Location within Ukraine
- Coordinates: 47°9′3″N 35°44′27″E
- Country: Ukraine
- Oblast: Zaporizhzhia Oblast
- Raion: Polohy Raion
- Hromada: Molochansk urban hromada
- Established: 1930

Area
  - Total: 58.4 km^{2} (22.5 sq mi)
- Elevation: 73 m (240 ft)

Population (2001)
  - Total: 1,073
  - Density: 18.4/km^{2} (47.6/sq mi)
- Postal code: 71770

Zaporizhzhia (Ukrainian: Запоріжжя), formerly Karl Liebknecht (Ukrainian: Карл Лібкнехт) is a village in Polohy Raion, Zaporizhzhia Oblast, Ukraine. Administratively, it is part of Molochansk urban hromada. In 2001 its population was 1073.

== Geography ==
The village is 9 kilometres southeast of Molochansk, 3 kilometres east of Ukrainka, 3.5 kilometres south of Vesele, and 4 kilometres northeast of Novomykolaivka.

== History ==
The village was founded in 1930 as Karl Liebknecht as part of the Molotschna Colony.

The village was later renamed to Zaporizhzhia after World War II.

The village became part of the Molochansk urban hromada on June 12, 2020, following the abolition of the Novomykolaivka Rural Council and the Novomykolaivka Rural Hromada.

The village became part of Polohy Raion on July 19, 2020, following the abolition of Tokmak Raion.

The village has been occupied by Russia since March 2022.

== Demographics ==
According to the 2001 Ukrainian census the village had a population of 1073. 86% spoke Ukrainian and 13% spoke Russian.

== Famous people ==
- Volodymyr Maksymovych Voronin, Ukrainian politician and former deputy of the Verkhovna Rada.
- Hryhoriy Ivanovych Hryn, Ukrainian scientist
