= Neuborn =

Abandoned village in Zaporizhzhia Oblast, Ukraine

Neuborn Нейборн
- Abandoned village
- Location within Zaporizhzhia Oblast Location within Ukraine
- Coordinates: 47°08′44″N 35°39′05″E
- Country: Ukraine
- Oblast: Zaporizhzhia Oblast
- Raion: Polohy Raion
- Hromada: Molochansk urban hromada

Area
  - Total: 0.32 km^{2} (0.12 sq mi)

Population (2026)
  - Total: 0
  - Density: 0.0/km^{2} (0.0/sq mi)
- Postal code: 71770

Neuborn (Ukrainian: Нейборн) is an abandoned village in Polohy Raion, Zaporizhzhia Oblast, Ukraine. Administratively, it is part of Molochansk urban hromada. In 2026 its population was 0.

== Geography ==
Neuborn is located 6 kilometres southeast of Molochansk, 2 kilometres southwest of Ukrainka, and 4 kilometres northwest of Novomykolaivka.

== History ==
Neuborn was founded in the 1930s, but was abandoned after World War II.

The abandoned village became part of the Molochansk urban hromada on June 12, 2020, following the abolition of the Novomykolaivka Rural Council and the Novomykolaivka Rural Hromada.

The abandoned village became part of Polohy Raion on July 19, 2020, following the abolition of Tokmak Raion.

The abandoned village has been occupied by Russia since early 2022.

== Demographics ==
The population of the village is 0.
