= Levadne, Molochansk Urban Hromada =

Village in Zaporizhzhia Oblast, Ukraine

Levadne Левадне
- Village
- Location within Zaporizhzhia Oblast Location within Ukraine
- Coordinates: 47°10′33″N 35°34′25″E
- Country: Ukraine
- Oblast: Zaporizhzhia Oblast
- Raion: Polohy Raion
- Hromada: Molochansk urban hromada
- Established: 1805

Area
  - Total: 0.89 km^{2} (0.34 sq mi)
- Elevation: 27 m (89 ft)

Population (2001)
  - Total: 232
  - Density: 260/km^{2} (680/sq mi)
- Postal code: 71760

Levadne (Ukrainian: Левадне), formerly Tiegenhagen (Ukrainian: Тігенгаген) is a village in Polohy Raion, Zaporizhzhia Oblast, Ukraine. Administratively it is part of Molochansk urban hromada. In 2001 its population was 232.

== Geography ==
The village is located 1.4 kilometres southeast of the Molochna River, 2 kilometres southwest of Molochansk, 1.5 kilometres northeast of Dolyna, and just over half a kilometre south of Muntau.

== History ==
Levadne was founded as Tiegenhagen in 1805 by 21 Flemish Mennonite families from West Prussia as part of the Molotschna Colony.

A forest was planted in the village in 1832.

In 1869 there were 23 farms, and 23 smallholdings. By 1908 there were two mills, a wagon factory, a brickyard, and a brass foundry.

There was a school and a church in the village.

The Mennonite residents left the village in 1943.

The village was renamed to Levadne in 1945.

The village became part of Molochansk urban hromada on June 12, 2020, following the abolition of the Dolyna Rural Council, and it became a part of Polohy Raion on July 19, following the abolition of Tokmak Raion.

The village has been occupied by Russia since February 2022.

== Demographics ==
According to the 2001 Ukrainian census the village had 232 residents, with 209 speaking Ukrainian, and 23 speaking Russian.

== Transport ==
The P85 Highway passes through the village, as well as the Fedorivka–Verkhnii Tokmak II–Volnovakha railway line, although there is no station.
