= Novomykolaivka rural hromada =

Hromada in Zaporizhzhia Oblast, Ukraine

Novomykolaivka Rural Hromada Новомиколаївська сільська територіальна громада
- Hromada
- Country: Ukraine
- Oblast: Zaporizhzhia Oblast
- Raion: Tokmak Raion
- Established: March 6, 2018
- Disestablished: June 12, 2020
- Admin. center: Novomykolaivka
- Settlements: 10
- Villages: 10

The Novomykolaivka Rural Hromada (Ukrainian: Новомиколаївська сільська територіальна громада) was a short lived hromada of Ukraine, located in Polohy Raion, Zaporizhzhia Oblast. Its administrative center was the village of Novomykolaivka.

The Hromada was formed on March 6, 2018 from a merger of the Balkove Rural Council and the Novomykolaivka Rural Council. The Hromada was merged into the Molochansk urban hromada on June 12, 2020.

The villages within the Hromada were:

- Balkove
- Hroznyi
- Hryshyne
- Kozoluhivka
- Kuroshany
- Mostove
- Novomykolaivka
- Svitle
- Ukrainka
- Vesele
- Yefymivna
- Zaporizhzhia

And 3 former villages: Neuborn, Friedensburh and Neuheim
