= Rybalivka =

Village in Zaporizhzhia Oblast, Ukraine

Rybalivka Рибалівка
- Village
- Location within Zaporizhzhia Oblast Location within Ukraine
- Coordinates: 47°7′32″N 35°32′15″E
- Country: Ukraine
- Oblast: Zaporizhzhia Oblast
- Raion: Polohy Raion
- Hromada: Molochansk urban hromada
- Established: 1804

Area
  - Total: 0.769 km^{2} (0.297 sq mi)
- Elevation: 21 m (69 ft)

Population (2001)
  - Total: 189
  - Density: 246/km^{2} (637/sq mi)
- Postal code: 71760

Rybalivka (Ukrainian: Рибалівка), formerly Fischau (Ukrainian: Фішау) is a village in Polohy Raion, Zaporizhzhia Oblast, Ukraine. Administratively, it is part of Molochansk urban hromada. In 2001 its population was 189.

== Geography ==
Rybalivka is located nearly 2 kilometres away from the Molochna River, 400 metres northeast of Liubymivka, 8 kilometres southwest of Molochansk, and 1.4 kilometres southwest of Dolyna.

== History ==
Rybalivka was founded in 1802 as Settlement №4 by 22 Mennonite families from West Prussia 1.4 kilometres northwest of the current village site on the north bank of the Molochna River as part of the Molotschna Colony. The village was moved to its current site in 1832 by Johann Cornies and renamed to Fischau after the village of the same name in Prussia (now Fiszewo).

In 1869 there were 28 farms and 23 smallholdings. By 1908 the village had a windmill, dye works, a blacksmith, a store and a furniture shop.

A school was built in the village on Shkilna Street in 1896, and demolished in 1998.

The village was renamed to Rybalivka in 1945.

The village became part of the Molochansk urban hromada on June 12, 2020, following the abolition of the Dolyna Rural Council.

The village became part of Polohy Raion on July 19, 2020, following the abolition of Tokmak Raion.

The village has been occupied by Russia since Late February 2022.

== Transport ==
The P85 highway passes through the village, as well as the Fedorivka–Verkhnii Tokmak II–Volnovakha railway line, although there is no station.

== Demographics ==
The population of the village according to the 2001 Ukrainian census was 189 people. 149 spoke Ukrainian and 40 spoke Russian.
