= Liubymivka, Zaporizhzhia Oblast =

Village in Zaporizhzhia Oblast, Ukraine

Liubymivka Любимівка
- Village
- Location within Zaporizhzhia Oblast Location within Ukraine
- Coordinates: 47°6′32″N 35°31′31″E
- Country: Ukraine
- Oblast: Zaporizhzhia Oblast
- Raion: Polohy Raion
- Hromada: Molochansk urban hromada
- Established: 1804

Area
  - Total: 0.62 km^{2} (0.24 sq mi)
- Elevation: 26 m (85 ft)

Population (2001)
  - Total: 181
  - Density: 290/km^{2} (760/sq mi)
- Postal code: 71760

Liubymivka (Ukrainian: Любимівка), formerly Lindenau (Ukrainian: Лінденау) is a village in Polohy Raion, Zaporizhzhia Oblast, Ukraine. Administratively, it is part of Molochansk urban hromada. In 2001 its population was 181.

== Geography ==
Liubymivka is located 800 metres from the Molochna River, 10 kilometres southwest of Molochansk, and 400 metres southwest of Rybalivka.

== History ==
Liubymivka was founded in 1804 as Settlement №5 by 21 Mennonite families from Prussia as part of the Molotschna Colony. The first houses were made of earth, and the land regularly flooded. The village was soon renamed to Lindenau.

In 1908 the village had three blacksmiths, two wagon manufacturers, a steam powered grain mill and a general store. A school was later built.

The mill closed after the start of Soviet rule and converted into a church which closed in 1931.

The Mennonite residents moved to Germany in 1943.

The village was renamed to Liubymivka in 1945.

The village became part of Molochansk urban hromada on June 12, 2020, following the abolition of the Dolyna Rural Council.

The village became part of Polohy Raion on July 19, 2020, following the abolition of Tokmak Raion.

The village has been occupied by Russia since March 2022.

== Demographics ==
The population of the village in 1908 was 454.

According to the 2001 Ukrainian census, the village had a population of 181 people. 146 spoke Ukrainian, 34 spoke Russian, and 1 spoke other.

== Transport ==
The P85 highway passes through the village, as well as the Fedorivka–Verkhnii Tokmak II–Volnovakha railway line, although there is no station.
