= Lichtfelde =

Former Village in Zaporizhzhia Oblast, Ukraine

Lichtfelde Ліхтфельде
- Former Village
- Location within Zaporizhzhia Oblast Location within Ukraine
- Coordinates: 47°3′12″N 35°49′15″E
- Country: Ukraine
- Oblast: Zaporizhzhia Oblast
- Raion: Polohy Raion
- Hromada: Molochansk urban hromada
- Established: 1819

Area
  - Total: 0.22 km^{2} (0.085 sq mi)
- Postal code: 71772

Lichtfelde (Ukrainian: Ліхтфельде)(German: Lichtfelde) is a former village in Polohy Raion, Zaporizhzhia Oblast, Ukraine. Administratively, it is part of Molochansk urban hromada. The village is part of Hrushivka.

== Geography ==
The former village is located on the banks of the Yushanly River. The village is 22 kilometres southeast of Molochansk, and 7 kilometres east of Lahidne.

== History ==
Alexanderkrone was founded by Flemish Mennonites in 1819 as part of the Molotschna Colony on the opposite bank from Alexanderkrone. The village was named after a village of the same name in West Prussia.

A school was built in the village in 1824. A dam was built on the Yushanly River, and a bridge built to Alexanderkrone.

The remaining German Mennonites were deported to Germany in 1941 and 1943.

Lichtfelde was merged with neighboring Alexanderkrone in 1962 to form the village of Hrushivka.

The former village became part of the Molochansk urban hromada on June 12, 2020, following the abolition of the Lahidne Rural Council.

The former village became part of Polohy Raion on July 19, 2020, following the abolition of Tokmak Raion.

The former village has been occupied by Russia since March 2022.
