= Kozoluhivka =

Village in Zaporizhzhia Oblast, Ukraine

Kozoluhivka Козолугівка
- Village
- Location within Zaporizhzhia Oblast Location within Ukraine
- Coordinates: 47°6′29″N 35°47′39″E
- Country: Ukraine
- Oblast: Zaporizhzhia Oblast
- Raion: Polohy Raion
- Hromada: Molochansk urban hromada
- Established: 1811

Area
  - Total: 0.103 km^{2} (0.040 sq mi)
- Elevation: 51 m (167 ft)

Population (2001)
  - Total: 221
  - Density: 2,150/km^{2} (5,560/sq mi)
- Postal code: 71773

Kozoluhivka (Ukrainian: Козолугівка), formerly Rückenau (Ukrainian: Ріккенау) and Shyroka Poliana (Ukrainian: Широка Поляна) is a village in Polohy Raion, Zaporizhzhia Oblast, Ukraine. Administratively, it is part of Molochansk urban hromada. In 2001 its population was 221.

== Geography ==
The village is located on the banks of the Kuroshany River. The village is 16 kilometres southeast of Molochansk, 2.5 kilometres east of Mostove, 1 kilometre southwest of Balkove, and 4 kilometres east of Novomykolaivka.

== History ==
Kozoluhivka was founded in 1811 as Rückenau after a village of the same name in Prussia. The village was settled by ten Mennonite families as part of the Molotschna Colony, with eight being from West Prussia, and two from Palatinate.

A school was built in 1844, and a forest was planted in the village. There was also an inn, which was later converted to a Mennonite Church.

In 1869, there were 26 farms and 34 smallholdings. In 1908 there was a motorized mill, a windmill, a general store, and a foundry.

Large parts of the village were destroyed in a storm in 1928, and in 1930, the village became part of the Ernst Thälmann Collective Farm, where multiple houses and farms were demolished.

83 German Mennonite residents were reported to Germany in 1943, and the village was renamed to Shyroka Poliana.

The village was renamed to Kozoluhivka in 1945.

The village became part of Molochansk urban hromada on June 12, 2020 following the abolition of the Balkove Rural Council and the Novomykolaivka Rural Hromada.

The village became part of Polohy Raion on July 19, 2020, following the abolition of Tokmak Raion.

The village has been occupied by Russia since March 2022.

== Monuments ==
- Mennonite Brethren Church. Built in 1883 to replace a former Inn, which had been used a church since 1869. The purpose built church was built in a Prussian style of brick, and was renovated in 1908. The building still stands today.
- Mennonite Nursing home. Built in 1895 for 15 people, it is now a private house. The brickwork decoration on the windows and corners are still visible.

== Demographics ==
The population of the village in 1908 was 408

According to the 2001 Ukrainian census, there were 221 residents of the village with 96% spoke Ukrainian and 3% spoke Russian..
