= Alexanderkrone =

Former Village in Zaporizhzhia Oblast, Ukraine

Alexanderkrone Александркроне
- Former Village
- Former windmill ruins

- Location within Zaporizhzhia Oblast Location within Ukraine
- Coordinates: 47°2′54″N 35°48′40″E
- Country: Ukraine
- Oblast: Zaporizhzhia Oblast
- Raion: Polohy Raion
- Hromada: Molochansk urban hromada
- Established: 1857

Area
  - Total: 0.51 km^{2} (0.20 sq mi)
- Postal code: 71772

Alexanderkrone (Ukrainian: Александркроне)(German: Alexanderkrone) is a former village in Polohy Raion, Zaporizhzhia Oblast, Ukraine. Administratively, it is part of Molochansk urban hromada. The village is part of Hrushivka.

== Geography ==
The former village is located on the banks of the Yushanly River. The village is 22 kilometres southeast of Molochansk, and 1 kilometre northeast of Kleefeld.

== History ==
Alexanderkrone was founded in 1857 as part of the Molotschna Colony and named after Alexander III of Russia.

A school was built in the early 20th Century, which still stands today, as does the ruined former windmill of 1888. A church was built in 1890, which is now associated with the Russian Orthodox Church.

The remaining German Mennonites were deported to Germany in 1941 and 1943.

Alexanderkrone was merged with neighboring Lichtfelde in 1962 to form the village of Hrushivka.

The former village became part of the Molochansk urban hromada on June 12, 2020, following the abolition of the Lahidne Rural Council.

The former village became part of Polohy Raion on July 19, 2020, following the abolition of Tokmak Raion.

The former village has been occupied by Russia since March 2022.

== Gallery ==
Paramedic Station

Mennonite building

Mennonite building

Former windmill

Interior of the former windmill

Exterior detail of the former windmill

Interior detail of the former windmill
