= Katharina Schellenberg =

American Mennonite medical missionary

- Born: 1870; Tiegerweide, Molotschna, Taurida Governorate, Russian Empire (now Ukraine)
- Died: January 1, 1945 (aged 74–75); Hyderabad, British Raj
- Citizenship: United States; Russian Empire
- Occupation: Missionary
- Years active: 1907–1945

Katharina Lohrenz Schellenberg (1870 – January 1, 1945) was an American Mennonite medical missionary of Russian birth.

Schellenberg was born in the colony of Tiegerweide, at the time in South Russia, today village Mostove, Polohy Raion in Ukraine; it was part of the Molotschna Mennonite colony. Her parents were Abraham and Katharina Lohrenz Schellenberg, with whom she immigrated to the United States in 1879, settling in Kansas. When she was fourteen, her mother died. At nineteen, she made her first commitment to Christ, joining the Mennonite congregation in Buhler, Kansas. Schellenberg studied medicine at the Deaconess Hospital in Cleveland, an undertook further study at the Medical Institute of Homeopathic Medicine in Kansas City, Kansas; she was the first woman among North American Mennonites to become a doctor, and became the denomination's first medical missionary in India when she traveled to that country in 1907. She learned to speak Telugu as part of her preparations. Early in her career she worked in various locations, from Hughestown as far south as the Tungabhadra River; the mission built a hospital at Nagarkurnool in 1912. The 1928 completion of another hospital, in Shamshabad, meant that city became her home base. Many of her patients were Muslim women who could not be seen by a male doctor. Schellenberg died suddenly in India, and is buried in the St. George Cemetery in Hyderabad. An archive of photographs related to her career in India is held at the Mennonite Library & Archives at Fresno Pacific University.
