= Mostove =

Village in Zaporizhzhia Oblast, Ukraine

Mostove Мостове
- Village
- Location within Zaporizhzhia Oblast Location within Ukraine
- Coordinates: 47°6′17″N 35°44′32″E
- Country: Ukraine
- Oblast: Zaporizhzhia Oblast
- Raion: Polohy Raion
- Hromada: Molochansk urban hromada
- Established: 1822

Area
  - Total: 42.8 km^{2} (16.5 sq mi)
- Elevation: 46 m (151 ft)

Population (2001)
  - Total: 178
  - Density: 4.16/km^{2} (10.8/sq mi)
- Postal code: 71771

Mostove (Ukrainian: Мостове), formerly Tiegerweide (Ukrainian: Тігервейде) is a village in Polohy Raion, Zaporizhzhia Oblast, Ukraine. Administratively, it is part of Molochansk urban hromada. In 2001 its population was 178.

== Geography ==
The village is located on the banks of the Kuroshany River. The village is 14 kilometres southeast of Molochansk, 2.5 kilometres west of Kozoluhivka, 6 kilometres north of Rozkishne, 500 metres southeast of Hroznyi, and just over half a kilometre east of Novomykolaivka.

== History ==
The village was founded as part of the Molotschna Colony in 1822 as Tiegerweide by 24 Mennonite families, 14 of which were from West Prussia.

Before the settlement was built, the areas was pasture for farmers in Tiege.

Alexander I of Russia visited the village in 1825 and suggested a tree plantation, which was planted in 1838.

In 1848, the village had 52 buildings including a school, a granary, and three Blacksmiths.

In 1869, there were 26 farms and 32 smallholdings.

The village was renamed to Mostove in 1945.

The village became part of the Molochansk urban hromada on June 12, 2020, following the abolition of the Novomykolaivka Rural Council and the Novomykolaivka Rural Hromada.

The village became part of Polohy Raion on July 19, 2020, following the abolition of Tokmak Raion.

The village has been occupied by Russia since March 2022.

== Demographics ==
In 1908 the population was 607.

According to the 2001 Ukrainian census, there were 178 residents of the village.

== Famous people ==
- Katharina Schellenberg, Mennonite missionary
