= Vesele, Polohy Raion, Zaporizhzhia Oblast =

Village in Zaporizhzhia Oblast, Ukraine

Vesele Веселе
- Village
- Location within Zaporizhzhia Oblast Location within Ukraine
- Coordinates: 47°11′27″N 35°43′56″E
- Country: Ukraine
- Oblast: Zaporizhzhia Oblast
- Raion: Polohy Raion
- Hromada: Molochansk urban hromada
- Established: 1930

Area
  - Total: 51.7 km^{2} (20.0 sq mi)
- Elevation: 68 m (223 ft)

Population (2001)
  - Total: 430
  - Density: 8.3/km^{2} (22/sq mi)
- Postal code: 71770

Vesele (Ukrainian: Веселе) is a village in Polohy Raion, Zaporizhzhia Oblast, Ukraine. Administratively, it is part of Molochansk urban hromada. In 2001 its population was 430.

== Geography ==
The village is 7 kilometres east of Molochansk, 3.5 kilometres north of Zaporizhzhia, 5 kilometres south of Tokmak, and 8.5 kilometres north of Novomykolaivka.

== History ==
The village was founded in 1930.

The village became part of the Molochansk urban hromada on June 12, 2020 following the abolition of the Novomykolaivka Rural Council and the Novomykolaivka Rural Council.

The village became part of Polohy Raion on July 19, 2020 following the abolition of Tokmak Raion.

The village has been occupied by Russia since March 2022.

== Demographics ==
According to the 2001 Ukrainian census the village had a population of 1073. 85% spoke Ukrainian and 14% spoke Russian.
