= Rozkishne =

Village in Zaporizhzhia Oblast, Ukraine

Rozkishne Розкішне
- Village
- Location within Zaporizhzhia Oblast Location within Ukraine
- Coordinates: 47°3′13″N 35°45′4″E
- Country: Ukraine
- Oblast: Zaporizhzhia Oblast
- Raion: Polohy Raion
- Hromada: Molochansk urban hromada
- Established: 1922

Area
  - Total: 1,415 km^{2} (546 sq mi)
- Elevation: 37 m (121 ft)

Population (2001)
  - Total: 268
  - Density: 0.189/km^{2} (0.491/sq mi)
- Postal code: 71774

Rozkishne (Ukrainian: Розкішне), formerly Vidvazhne (Ukrainian: Відважне) is a village in Polohy Raion, Zaporizhzhia Oblast, Ukraine. Administratively, it is part of Molochansk urban hromada. In 2001 its population was 268.

== Geography ==
The village is located on the banks of the Yushanly River. The village is 18 kilometres southeast of Molochansk, 500 metres north of Mohutnie, and 6 kilometres south of Mostove.

== History ==
The village was founded in 1922 as Vidvazhne.

The village was renamed to Rozkishne in 1964.

The village became part of the Molochansk urban hromada on June 12, 2020, following the abolition of the Lahidne Rural Council.

The village became part of Polohy Raion on July 19, 2020, following the abolition of Tokmak Raion.

The village has been occupied by Russia since March 2022.

== Demographics ==
According to the 2001 Ukrainian census, the village had a population of 268. 82% spoke Ukrainian, and 15% spoke Russian.
