= Molochansk City Council =

Rural council in Zaporizhzhia Oblast, Ukraine

Molochansk City Council Молочанська міська рада
- City Council
- Location within Zaporizhzhia Oblast Location within Ukraine
- Coordinates: 47°12′16″N 35°35′45″E
- Country: Ukraine
- Oblast: Zaporizhzhia Oblast
- Raion: Polohy Raion
- Established: 1923
- Admin. centre: Molochansk

Area
  - Total: 90 km^{2} (35 sq mi)

Population (2015)
  - Total: 6,781
  - Density: 75/km^{2} (200/sq mi)
- Postal code: 71716, 71717

The Molochansk City Council (Ukrainian: Молочанська міська рада) is a City Council in Polohy Raion, Zaporizhzhia Oblast in Southern Ukraine. Its population was 6,781 in 2015. It was founded in 1923 and was merged into the Molochansk Urban Hromada on June 12, 2020.

The council's administrative centre is located in the city of Molochansk.

The city council contains three villages: Muntau, Hoffental, and Pryshyb

== Demographics ==
The population of the city council area was 6,781 in 2015

== Leadership ==
- Anatoliy Hryhorovych Smerdov (2006–2010)
- Volodymyr Oleksandrovych Volvach (2010–Present)
