= Balkove =

Village in Zaporizhzhia Oblast, Ukraine

Balkove Балкове
- Village
- Location within Zaporizhzhia Oblast Location within Ukraine
- Coordinates: 47°7′51″N 35°48′57″E
- Country: Ukraine
- Oblast: Zaporizhzhia Oblast
- Raion: Polohy Raion
- Hromada: Molochansk urban hromada
- Established: 1821

Area
  - Total: 0.103 km^{2} (0.040 sq mi)
- Elevation: 53 m (174 ft)

Population (2001)
  - Total: 501
  - Density: 4,860/km^{2} (12,600/sq mi)
- Postal code: 71772

Balkove (Ukrainian: Балкове), formerly Fürstenwerder (Ukrainian: Фірстенвердер) and Poworotnoje (Ukrainian: Поворотне) is a village in Polohy Raion, Zaporizhzhia Oblast, Ukraine. Administratively, it is part of Molochansk urban hromada. In 2001 its population was 501.

== Geography ==
The village is located on the banks of the Behym-Chokrak River. The village is 16 kilometres southeast of Molochansk, 1.3 kilometres northeast of Kozoluhivka, and 6 kilometres northeast of Novomykolaivka.

== History ==
Balkove was founded as Fürstenwerder in 1821 by 30 Flemish Mennonite families. Four families came from other parts of the Molotschna Colony, with the others coming from Prussia between 1816 and 1819. The village was named after a village of the same name in Prussia.

In 1848, the village had 8 brick farmhouses and 22 brick houses.

In 1869, there were 22 farms and 52 smallholdings, as well as a windmill and a brickyard.

The village was renamed to Poworotnoje in 1915, but shortly renamed back to Fürstenwerder.

The village was renamed to Balkove in 1946.

The village became part of Molochansk urban hromada on June 12, 2020 following the abolition of the Balkove Rural Council and the Novomykolaivka Rural Hromada.

The village became part of Polohy Raion on July 19, 2020, following the abolition of Tokmak Raion.

The village has been occupied by Russia since March 2022.

== Demographics ==
According to the 2001 Ukrainian census, there were 501 residents of the village with 91% spoke Ukrainian and 8% spoke Russian..
