= Lahidne Rural Council =

Rural council in Zaporizhzhia Oblast, Ukraine

Lahidne Rural Council Лагідне сільська рада
- Rural council
- Location within Zaporizhzhia Oblast Location within Ukraine
- Coordinates: 47°2′53″N 35°42′27″E
- Country: Ukraine
- Oblast: Zaporizhzhia Oblast
- Raion: Tokmak Raion
- Disestablished: June 12, 2020
- Admin. centre: Lahidne

Area
  - Total: 6,146 km^{2} (2,373 sq mi)

Population (2001)
  - Total: 2,344
  - Density: 0.3814/km^{2} (0.9878/sq mi)
- Postal code: 71774

The Lahidne Rural Council (Ukrainian: Лагідне сільська рада), formerly the Kirove Rural Council (Ukrainian: Кіровська сільська рада) was a Rural Council in Tokmak Raion, Zaporizhzhia Oblast in Southern Ukraine. Its population was 2,344 in the 2001 Ukrainian census.

The council's administrative centre was located in the village of Lahidne. Village councils as separate administrative divisions were abolished in 2020 and replaced with Hromadas, when the council was replaced with the Molochansk urban hromada.

The rural council was renamed to the Lahidne Rural Council in 2016 due to the renaming of Lahidne village due to Decommunization.

The villages within the rural council were:

- Hrushivka
- Lahidne
- Mohutnie
- Rozkishne
- Udarnyk
- Zoriane

As well as 5 former villages: Alexanderkrone, Lichtfelde, Malakhivka, Prangenau, Novohradivka and Kleefeld.

== Demographics ==
According to the 2001 Ukrainian Census, 84.77% of the population were Ukrainian speaking, with 14.33% speaking Russian.

== Leadership ==
- Oleksandr Pavlovych Khimich (2006–2008)
- Petro Vasylovych Yakymenko (2008–2020)
