= Fedorivka, Polohy Raion, Zaporizhzhia Oblast =

Fedorivka Федорівка
- Village
- Location of Fedorivka in Zaporizhzhia Oblast Fedorivka (Ukraine)
- Coordinates: 47°32′28″N 36°33′33″E
- Country: Ukraine
- Oblast: Zaporizhzhia Oblast
- District: Polohy Raion
- Hromada: Fedorivka rural hromada
- Founded: 1779

Area
  - Total: 1.023 km^{2} (0.395 sq mi)
- Elevation: 138 m (453 ft)

Population (2001)
  - Total: 2,214
  - Density: 2,164/km^{2} (5,605/sq mi)
- Time zone: UTC+2 (EET)
  - Summer (DST): UTC+3 (EEST)
- Postal code: 70629
- Area code: +380 6165
- Climate: Dfa
- Website: http://rada.gov.ua/

Fedorivka (Ukrainian: Федорівка; Russian: Фёдоровка) is a village (a selo) in the Polohy Raion (district) of Zaporizhzhia Oblast in southern Ukraine.

== History ==
Fedorivka was founded in 1779 as Burlatska. In 1822, it was renamed the village of Fedorivka. In the 19th century on the right bank of the river Haichul was the state village of Fedorivka (Burlatske) and on the left bank the lordly village of Krute (Rezydentove). According to the 1859 census, Fedorivka had 285 courtyards, 2,327 inhabitants, an Orthodox church, a fair, and a bazaar. Krute had 25 yards, 235 inhabitants and had a significant portion of the Russian population.

In 1925, Fedorivka was renamed Vlasivka. At least 152 villagers died during the Holodomor. In 1938, Vlasivka was changed back to Fedorivka. From 7 October 1941 to 15 September 1943, close to the Eastern Front Fedorivka was occupied by Nazi Germany. In 1960 it was renamed Chubarivka in honor of Vlas Chubar who was born in this village.

On 19 May 2016, Verkhovna Rada adopted decision to rename Chubarivka back to Fedorivka according to the law prohibiting names of Communist origin.

== Demographics ==
According to the 1989 census, the population of Fedorivka was 2,211 people, of whom 993 were men and 1,218 women.

Native language as of the Ukrainian Census of 2001:

- Ukrainian 92.50%
- Russian 6.96%
- Armenian 0.23%
- Moldovan (Romanian) 0.18%
