= Hryhoriy Hryn =

Ukrainian Scientist

Hryhoriy Ivanovych Hryn
- Григорій Іванович Гринь
- Born: August 1, 1951 (age 75); Zaporizhzhia, Tokmak Raion, Zaporizhia Oblast, Ukrainian SSR
- Education: Kharkiv Polytechnic Institute
- Occupation: Scientist
- Years active: 1974 – present

Hryhoriy Ivanovych Hryn (Ukrainian: Григо́рій Іва́нович Гри́нь; born August 1, 1951) is a Ukrainian scientist and academician.

Hryn was born in the village of Zaporizhzhia in Tokmak Raion. He graduated from the Kharkiv Polytechnic Institute in 1974, where he has been working since then.

He was awarded the Honored Science and Technology Figure of Ukraine in 2015.
