= Neu-Halbstadt =

Village formerly in Zaporizhzhia Oblast, Ukraine

Neu-Halbstadt Ней-Гальбштадт
- Former village
- Location within Zaporizhzhia Oblast Location within Ukraine
- Coordinates: 47°12′16″N 35°36′14″E
- Country: Ukraine
- Oblast: Zaporizhzhia Oblast
- Raion: Polohy Raion
- Hromada: Molochansk urban hromada
- Established: 1843
- Postal code: 71717

Neu-Halbstadt (Ukrainian: Ней-Гальбштадт) is a former village within Molochansk in Polohy Raion, Zaporizhzhia Oblast, Ukraine.

The village was part of the Molotschna Colony.

== Geography ==
Neu-Halbstadt was located just south of Halbstadt, and the site of the village is now between the main city centre and the railway line.

== History ==
Neu-Halbstadt was founded in 1843 by Johann Cornies for craftsmen. The village covered 550 acres, and was inhabited by retired farm owners who constructed many buildings in the village.

The village developed into an intellectual and economic centre of the Molotschna Colony. The Halbstadt Zentralschule (founded in 1835) moved to the village from Halbstadt. 150 students attended the school in 1914.

The village is now part of Molochansk, and has been occupied by the Russians since February 27, 2022.

== Transport ==
The Fedorivka - Verkhniy Tokmak II - Volnovakha line runs through the former village, with the Molochansk railway station there too.
