= Udarnyk =

Village in Zaporizhzhia Oblast, Ukraine

Udarnyk Ударник
- Village
- Location within Zaporizhzhia Oblast Location within Ukraine
- Coordinates: 47°2′59″N 35°51′54″E
- Country: Ukraine
- Oblast: Zaporizhzhia Oblast
- Raion: Polohy Raion
- Hromada: Molochansk urban hromada
- Established: 1819

Area
  - Total: 1.35 km^{2} (0.52 sq mi)
- Elevation: 54 m (177 ft)

Population (2001)
  - Total: 467
  - Density: 346/km^{2} (896/sq mi)
- Postal code: 71775

Udarnyk (Ukrainian: Ударник), formerly Neukirche (Ukrainian: Нейкірх) is a village in Polohy Raion, Zaporizhzhia Oblast, Ukraine. Administratively, it is part of Molochansk urban hromada. In 2001 its population was 467.

== Geography ==
The village is located on the banks of the Yushanly River. The village is 24 kilometres southeast of Molochansk, 1.4 kilometres east of Hrushivka, and 10 kilometres east of Lahidne.

== History ==
Udarnyk was founded in 1819 as Neukirche by 20 Mennonite families from Marienburg, Elbing and Tiegenhof, all in West Prussia. 22 houses were built in the village in 1821. Later a dye works, a school, and a brick factory were also built, as well as a church in 1865, which still stands today.

The village was home to a agricultural machinery shop, a windmill, a motorised mill, and a horse powered mill.

The village was part of the Molotschna Colony

In 1910, there were 52 farms in the village.

The village was renamed to Udarnyk in 1945.

The village became part of the Molochansk urban hromada on June 12, 2020, following the abolition of the Lahidne Rural Council.

The village became part of Polohy Raion on July 19, 2020, following the abolition of Tokmak Raion.

The village has been occupied by Russia since March 2022.

== Monuments ==
- A memorial stone in the village commemorates the Mennonites in Ukrainian, Russian and English.

== Demographics ==
The population of the village was 232 in 1838, 526 in 1910, 507 in 1914 and 385 in 1939.

According to the 2001 Ukrainian census, the village had a population of 467. 86% spoke Ukrainian, and 13% spoke Russian.
