= Volodymyr Voronin =

Ukrainian Politician and Mechanic

- Володимир Воронін
- Born: February 10, 1942 (age 84); Chernihivka Raion, Zaporizhzhia Oblast, Reichskommissariat Ukraine
- Citizenship: Ukraine
- Education: Molochansk Rural Industrial Technical School of Zaporizhzhia Oblast
- Occupations: Politician, Mechanic

Volodymyr Maksymovych Voronin (born February 10, 1942, in Chernihivka Raion, Zaporizhzhia Oblast) is a Ukrainian mechanic and politician.

== Biography ==
Voronin was born on February 10, 1942, in Chernihivka Raion, Zaporizhzhia Oblast.

He began working as a tractor and combine harvester driver at the Zaporizhzhia State Farm in Zaporizhzhia, Tokmak Raion in 1958.

Voronin was a member of the Communist Party of the Soviet Union from 1965 to 1991.

By order of the Presidium of the Supreme Soviet of the Soviet Union on August 6, 1974, he was awarded the Hero of Socialist Labour award with the Order of Lenin for his agricultural skill.

In August 1974, Voronin worked at the Zhdanov Collective Farm in Lubny Raion, Poltava Oblast.

Voronin was a deputy of the Verkhovna Rada in 1985.

Voronin later retired to Zaporizhzhia, in Tokmak Raion.

== Awards ==
- Hero of Socialist Labour - August 6, 1974
- Two Order of Lenins - August 12, 1973, and August 6, 1974
- Order of the October Revolution - December 24, 1976
- Order of the Red Banner of Labour - March 8, 1971
- USSR State Prize - 1977
- Honorary citizen of Tokmak Raion
