= Viktor Kostiukevych =

Viktor Mytrofanovych Kostiukevych
- Born: March 1, 1953 (age 73); Kuroshany, Polohy Raion, Zaporizhzhia Oblast, Ukrainian SSR
- Education: Vinnytsia State Pedagogical University
- Occupations: Scientist, Teacher, Former Head Coach of the Ukrainian National Football Team
- Years active: 1972–present

Viktor Mytrofanovych Kostiukevych (born March 1, 1953, in Kuroshany, Polohy Raion, Zaporizhzhia Oblast) is a Ukrainian Scientist, Doctor of Sciences in Physical Education and Sports, professor, Honoured Coach of Ukraine (1998), teacher, coach, professor of the Department of Theory and Methods of Sport of the Vinnytsia State Pedagogical University.

== Biography ==
Kostiukevych was born on March 1, 1953, in the village of Kuroshany, Polohy Raion, Zaporizhzhia Oblast.

He attended Agricultural College in Bratslav, and then became an electrical technician. He served in the Soviet Armed Forces in East Germany from 1972 to 1974. He then worked as an electrician at the tractor factory in Vinnytsia.

Kostiukevych graduated from the Vinnytsia State Pedagogical University in 1979, and began working there, where he received the positions of Deputy Head of the Sports Club, Lecturer, Associate Professor, Head of the Department of Sports Games, Head of the Department of Theory and Methods of Sport, and Physical Education.

Kostiukevych has headed the Vinnytsia State Pedagogical University Hockey team since 1981, and was the head coach of Olimpik-SHVSM-VDPU, a Vinnytsia hockey team.

== Awards ==
Kostiukevych has been awarded the Diploma of the Verkhovna Rada of Ukraine and the Diploma of Honour of the Ministry of Education and Science of Ukraine.
