= Yuvileine (disambiguation) =

Yuvileine (Ukrainian: Ювілейне) is the former name of Katerynivka, Luhansk Oblast, a city in Ukraine. It may also refer to:

- Yuvileine, Kherson Oblast
- The former name of Slobozhanske, Dnipropetrovsk Oblast
- The former name of Zoriane, Molochansk urban hromada, Polohy Raion, Zaporizhzhia Oblast
