= Muntau =

Village in Zaporizhzhia Oblast, Ukraine

Muntau Мунтау
- village
- Muntau Hospital

- Location within Zaporizhzhia Oblast Location within Ukraine
- Coordinates: 47°11′37″N 35°34′53″E
- Country: Ukraine
- Oblast: Zaporizhzhia Oblast
- Raion: Polohy Raion
- Hromada: Molochansk urban hromada
- Established: 1804

Area
  - Total: 0.70 km^{2} (0.27 sq mi)

Population (1913)
  - Total: 400
  - Density: 570/km^{2} (1,500/sq mi)
- Postal code: 71717

Muntau (Ukrainian: Мунтау) is a village in Polohy Raion, Zaporizhzhia Oblast, Ukraine. Administratively, it is part of Molochansk urban hromada. The village was part of Molotschna Colony.

The village has been occupied by Russia since February 2022.

== Geography ==
Muntau is located 815 metres from the Molochna River. The village is adjacent to Molochansk and just over half a kilometre north of Levadne.

== History ==
Muntau was founded in June 1804 when 21 families from West Prussia settled here. The first houses in the village weren't built until 1805-1806.

A forest was planted in the village in 1830. The village economy was predominantly agricultural, however there was also a mill and a starch factory.

A school was built in 1852, and in 1889 a hospital was built using donated funds from Franz Wall, and was enlarged in 1911.

The village is now within Molochansk city boundaries.

== Demographics ==
The population of the village in 1913 was 400, mostly Mennonites.

== Transport ==
The P85 Highway runs through the village.
