= Vynohradne Rural Council =

Rural council in Zaporizhzhia Oblast, Ukraine

Vynohradne Rural Council Виноградненська сільська рада
- Rural council
- Location within Zaporizhzhia Oblast Location within Ukraine
- Coordinates: 47°12′14″N 35°33′33″E
- Country: Ukraine
- Oblast: Zaporizhzhia Oblast
- Raion: Tokmak Raion
- Established: 1993
- Disestablished: June 12, 2020
- Admin. centre: Vynohradne

Area
  - Total: 1,579 km^{2} (610 sq mi)

Population (2001)
  - Total: 593
  - Density: 0.376/km^{2} (0.973/sq mi)
- Postal code: 71761

The Vynohradne Rural Council (Ukrainian: Виноградненська сільська рада) was a Rural Council in Tokmak Raion, Zaporizhzhia Oblast in Southern Ukraine. Its population was 593 in the 2001 Ukrainian census.

The council's administrative centre was located in the village of Vynohradne. Village councils as separate administrative divisions were abolished in 2020 and replaced with Hromadas, when the rural council was replaced with the Molochansk urban hromada.

The villages within the rural council were:

- Vynohradne
- Blahodatne
- Veinavskyi

And 1 former village: Durlach

== History ==
The rural council was created in 1993 out of Dolyna Rural Council.

== Demographics ==
According to the 2001 Ukrainian Census, 88.7% of the population were Ukrainian speaking, with 10.96% speaking Russian.

== Leadership ==
From 2006 to its abolition, the head of the council was Nina Vasylivna Bilyk.
