= Kleefeld, Ukraine =

Abandoned Village in Zaporizhzhia Oblast, Ukraine

Kleefeld Клефельд
- Abandoned Village
- Location within Zaporizhzhia Oblast Location within Ukraine
- Coordinates: 47°2′39″N 35°46′32″E
- Country: Ukraine
- Oblast: Zaporizhzhia Oblast
- Raion: Polohy Raion
- Hromada: Molochansk urban hromada
- Established: 1854

Area
  - Total: 0.16 km^{2} (0.062 sq mi)

Population (2026)
  - Total: 0
  - Density: 0.0/km^{2} (0.0/sq mi)
- Postal code: 71774

Kleefeld (Ukrainian: Клефельд)(German: Kleefeld) is an abandoned village in Polohy Raion, Zaporizhzhia Oblast, Ukraine. Administratively, it is part of Molochansk urban hromada. In 2026 its population was 0.

== Geography ==
The abandoned village was located on the banks of the Yushanly River. The village is 20 kilometres southeast of Molochansk, 1 kilometre southwest of Alexanderkrone, and 1.6 kilometres southeast of Mohutnie.

== History ==
Kleefeld was founded in 1854 by 40 Mennonite families as part of the Molotschna Colony.

In 1869, there were 43 farms in the village and 38 smallholdings. By 1908 there were two mills and a brickyard.

The village was almost completely destroyed during World War II.

The abandoned village became part of the Molochansk urban hromada on June 12, 2020, following the abolition of the Lahidne Rural Council.

The abandoned village became part of Polohy Raion on July 19, 2020, following the abolition of Tokmak Raion.

The abandoned village has been occupied by Russia since March 2022.

== Demographics ==
The village has a population of 0.
