= Hrushivka, Zaporizhzhia Oblast =

Village in Zaporizhzhia Oblast, Ukraine

Hrushivka Грушівка
- Village
- Mennonite architecture in Hrushivka

- Location within Zaporizhzhia Oblast Location within Ukraine
- Coordinates: 47°2′54″N 35°48′40″E
- Country: Ukraine
- Oblast: Zaporizhzhia Oblast
- Raion: Polohy Raion
- Hromada: Molochansk urban hromada
- Established: 1962

Area
  - Total: 1,843 km^{2} (712 sq mi)
- Elevation: 49 m (161 ft)

Population (2001)
  - Total: 319
  - Density: 0.173/km^{2} (0.448/sq mi)
- Postal code: 71772

Hrushivka (Ukrainian: Грушівка) is a village in Polohy Raion, Zaporizhzhia Oblast, Ukraine. Administratively, it is part of Molochansk urban hromada. In 2001 its population was 319.

== Geography ==
The village is located on the banks of the Yushanly River. The village is 22 kilometres southeast of Molochansk, 1.4 kilometres west of Udarnyk, and 1 kilometre northeast of Kleefeld.

== History ==
Hrushivka was founded in 1962 from the merger of the villages of Alexanderkrone and Lichtfelde.

A school was built in 1824 in the former village of Lichtfelde, and another in the Early 20th Century in the former village of Alexanderkrone, which still stands today, as does the ruined former windmill of 1888. A church was built in 1890, which is now associated with the Russian Orthodox Church.

The remaining German Mennonites were deported to Germany in 1941 and 1943.

The village became part of the Molochansk urban hromada on June 12, 2020, following the abolition of the Lahidne Rural Council.

The village became part of Polohy Raion on July 19, 2020, following the abolition of Tokmak Raion.

The village has been occupied by Russia since March 2022.

== Demographics ==
According to the 2001 Ukrainian census, the village had a population of 319. 87% spoke Ukrainian, and 12% spoke Russian.

== Gallery ==
Paramedic Station

Mennonite building

Mennonite building

Former windmill

Interior of the former windmill

Exterior detail of the former windmill

Interior detail of the former windmill
