= Mohutnie =

Village in Zaporizhzhia Oblast, Ukraine

Mohutnie Монутнє
- Village
- Location within Zaporizhzhia Oblast Location within Ukraine
- Coordinates: 47°2′51″N 35°43′58″E
- Country: Ukraine
- Oblast: Zaporizhzhia Oblast
- Raion: Polohy Raion
- Hromada: Molochansk urban hromada
- Established: 1922

Area
  - Total: 0.491 km^{2} (0.190 sq mi)
- Elevation: 43 m (141 ft)

Population (2001)
  - Total: 168
  - Density: 342/km^{2} (886/sq mi)
- Postal code: 71774

Mohutnie (Ukrainian: Монутнє) is a village in Polohy Raion, Zaporizhzhia Oblast, Ukraine. Administratively, it is part of Molochansk urban hromada. In 2001 its population was 168.

== Geography ==
The village is located on the banks of the Yushanly River. The village is 18 kilometres southeast of Molochansk, 1.6 kilometres northwest of Kleefeld, 500 metres south of Rozkishne and adjacent to Lahidne.

== History ==
Mohutnie was founded in 1922.

The village became part of the Molochansk urban hromada on June 12, 2020, following the abolition of the Lahidne Rural Council.

The village became part of Polohy Raion on July 19, 2020, following the abolition of Tokmak Raion.

The village has been occupied by Russia since March 2022.

== Demographics ==
According to the 2001 Ukrainian census, the village had a population of 168. 84% spoke Ukrainian, 8% spoke Russian, and 6% spoke Crimean Tatar.
