= Zoriane =

Village in Zaporizhzhia Oblast, Ukraine

Zoriane Зоряне
- Village
- Location within Zaporizhzhia Oblast Location within Ukraine
- Coordinates: 47°1′35″N 35°41′54″E
- Country: Ukraine
- Oblast: Zaporizhzhia Oblast
- Raion: Polohy Raion
- Hromada: Molochansk urban hromada
- Established: 1920

Area
  - Total: 0.373 km^{2} (0.144 sq mi)
- Elevation: 57 m (187 ft)

Population (2001)
  - Total: 167
  - Density: 448/km^{2} (1,160/sq mi)
- Postal code: 71774

Zoriane (Ukrainian: Зоряне), formerly Lykhe (Ukrainian: Лихе) and Yuvileine (Ukrainian: Ювілейне) is a village in Polohy Raion, Zaporizhzhia Oblast, Ukraine. Administratively, it is part of Molochansk urban hromada. In 2001 its population was 167.

== Geography ==
The village is 19 kilometres southeast of Molochansk, 3 kilometres north of Novohradivka, and 1.8 kilometres southwest of Lahidne.

== History ==
Zoriane was founded in 1920 as Lykhe. It was renamed to Yuvileine in 1967 in honour of the 50th Anniversary of the October Revolution.

The village was renamed to Zoriane in 2016 due to Decommunization.

The village became part of the Molochansk urban hromada on June 12, 2020, following the abolition of the Lahidne Rural Council.

The village became part of Polohy Raion on July 19, 2020, following the abolition of Tokmak Raion.

The village has been occupied by Russia since March 2022.

== Demographics ==
According to the 2001 Ukrainian census, the village had a population of 167.
