= Orikhiv Raion =

Former subdivision of Zaporizhzhia Oblast, Ukraine

Orikhiv Raion Оріхівський район
- Raion
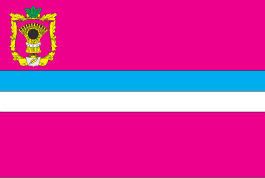
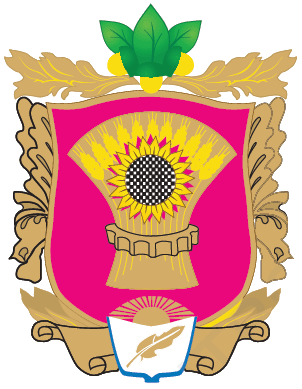
- Flag Coat of arms

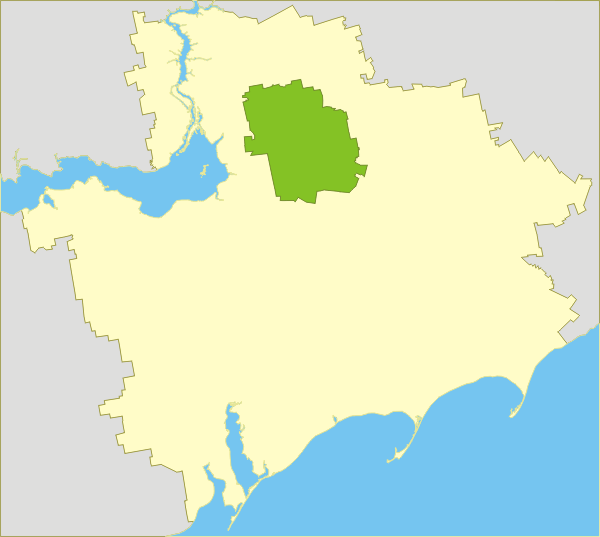
- Orikhiv Raion (green) within Zaporizhzhia Oblast.
- Coordinates: 47°41′13.2″N 35°46′45″E
- Country: Ukraine
- Region: Zaporizhzhia Oblast
- Established: 7 March 1923
- Disestablished: 18 July 2020
- Admin. center: Orikhiv
- Subdivisions: List: 1 — city councils; 1 — settlement councils; 22 — rural councils; Number of localities: 1 — cities; 1 — urban-type settlements; 55 — villages; 4 — rural settlements

Area
  - Total: 1,590 km^{2} (610 sq mi)

Population (2020)
  - Total: 44,114 ▼
  - Density: 27.7/km^{2} (71.9/sq mi)
- Time zone: UTC+02:00 (EET)
  - Summer (DST): UTC+03:00 (EEST)
- Postal index: 70500–70562
- Area code: +380 6141
- Website: orrada.gov.ua

Orikhiv Raion (Ukrainian: Оріхівський район, romanized: Orixivs'kyj rajon) was one of raions (districts) of Zaporizhzhia Oblast in southern Ukraine. The administrative center of the raion was located in the city of Orikhiv. Its population was 54,462 as of the 2001 Ukrainian Census. The raion was abolished on 18 July 2020 as part of the administrative reform of Ukraine, which reduced the number of raions of Zaporizhzhia Oblast to five. The area of Orikhiv Raion was split between Polohy Raion and Zaporizhzhia Raion. The last estimate of the raion population was 44,114 (2020 est.).

Into Polohy Raion:

- Orikhiv urban hromada
- Mala Tokmachka rural hromada
- Preobrazhenka rural hromada

Into Zaporizhzhia Raion:

- Komyshuvakha settlement hromada
- Tavriiske rural hromada

== Geography ==
Orikhiv Raion was located in the northeast portion of Zaporizhzhia Oblast. Its total area constituted 1,600 km^{2} (620 mi^{2}). The Komyshuvakha, Konka, Sherebets, Verkhnia Tersa, and Mala Tokmachka Rivers flowed through the raion.

== History ==
Orikhiv Raion was first established on 7 March 1923 as part of a full-scale administrative reorganization of the Ukrainian Soviet Socialist Republic.

== Government ==
Orikhiv Raion was governed by the Orikhiv Raion Council (Ukrainian: Оріхівська районна рада), which consisted of 48 locally elected deputies. In October 2014, Karina Dudnichenko was elected the chairman of the council.

== Administrative divisions ==
Orikhiv Raion was divided in a way that followed the general administrative scheme in Ukraine. Local government was also organized along a similar scheme nationwide. Consequently, raions were subdivided into councils, which were the prime level of administrative division in the country.

Each of the raion's urban populated places administered their own councils, often containing a few villages and rural settlements within its jurisdiction. However, only a handful of rural populated places were organized into councils, which also might contain a few villages and rural settlements within its jurisdiction.

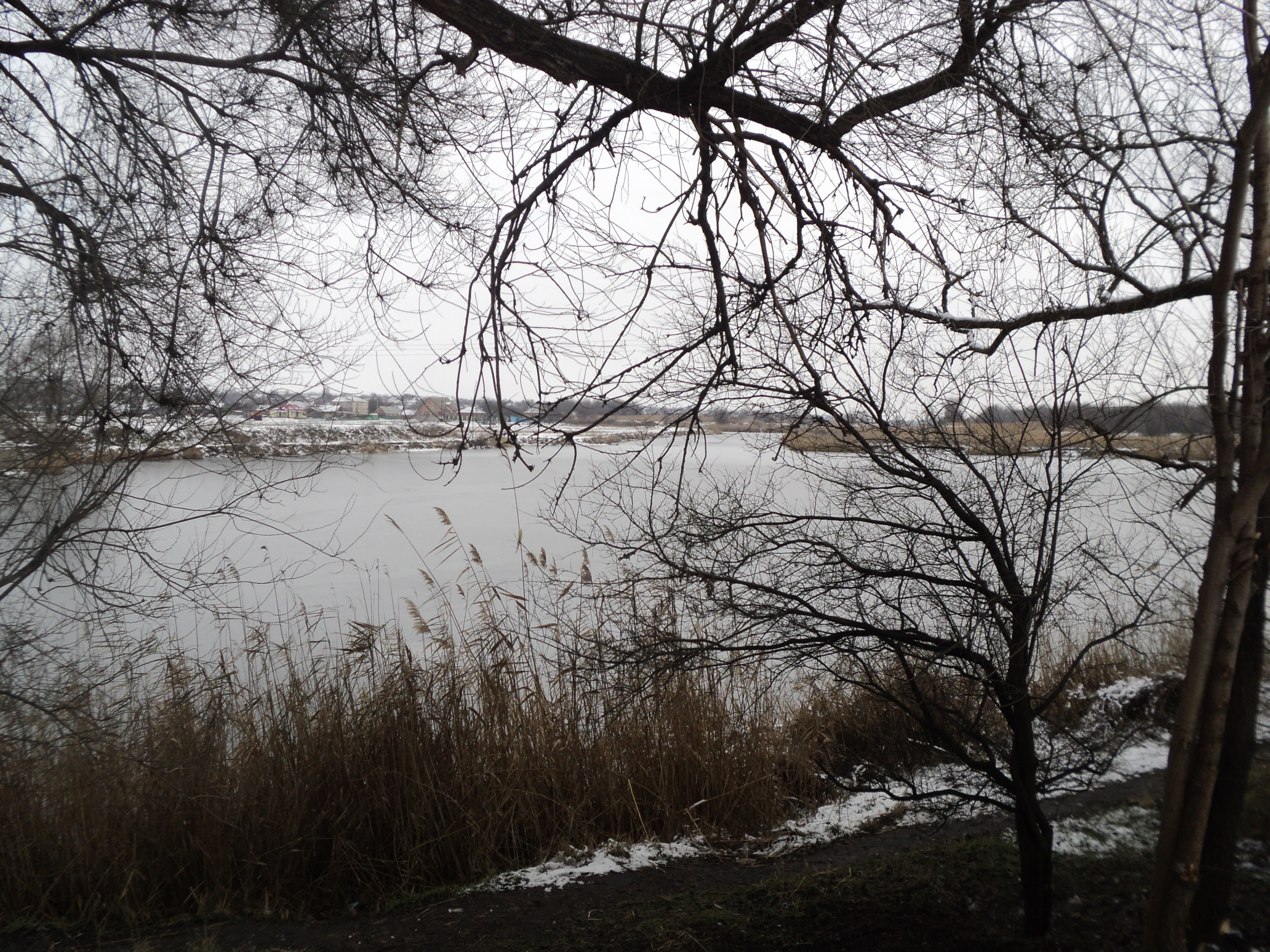
The Konka River near the raion's administrative center Orikhiv.

Accordingly, the Orikhiv Raion was divided into:

- 1 city council—made up of the city of Orikhiv (administrative center);
- 1 settlement council—made up of the urban-type settlement of Komyshuvakha
- 22 rural councils

Overall, the raion had a total of 60 populated localities, consisting of one city, one urban-type settlement, 54 villages, and 4 rural settlements.

== Demographics ==
In the 2001 Ukrainian census, the raion's total population was 54,462. Of that, 44,618 were Ukrainians, 3,998 were Russians, 197 were Belarusians, 99 were Bulgarians, and 444 belonged to other ethnic groups. The percentage of the population which indicated Ukrainian as their native language constituted 91.37 percent, compared to 8.17% for the Russian language.
