= Molochansk urban hromada =

Molochansk urban hromada Молочанська міська громада
- Hromada
- Interactive map of Molochansk urban hromada
- Country: Ukraine
- Oblast: Zaporizhzhia Oblast
- Raion: Polohy Raion
- Established: June 12, 2020
- Admin. center: Molochansk

Area
  - Total: 567.4 km^{2} (219.1 sq mi)

Population (2020)
  - Total: 11,790
  - Density: 20.78/km^{2} (53.82/sq mi)
- Settlements: 29
- Cities: 1
- Rural settlements: 1
- Villages: 27

Molochansk urban hromada (Ukrainian: Молочанська міська громада) is a hromada of Ukraine, located in Polohy Raion, Zaporizhzhia Oblast. Its administrative center is the city of Molochansk.

It has an area of 567.4 square kilometres (219.1 mi^{2}) and a population of 11,790, as of 2020. The hromada borders Tokmak urban hromada.

The hromada contains 29 settlements: 1 city (Molochansk), 27 villages:

- Balkove
- Blahodatne
- Veinavskyi
- Vesele
- Vynohradne
- Hoffental
- Hroznyi
- Hryshyne
- Hrushivka
- Dolyna
- Kozoluhivka
- Kuroshany
- Lahidne
- Levadne
- Liubymivka
- Mohutnie
- Mostove
- Muntau
- Novomykolaivka
- Pryshyb
- Rybalivka
- Rozkishne
- Svitle
- Udarnyk
- Ukrainka
- Yefymivna
- Zaporizhzhia

And 1 rural-type settlement: Zoriane.

And 11 former villages: Neu-Halbstadt, Alexanderkrone, Lichtfelde, Malakhivka, Prangenau, Novohradivka, Neuheim, Neuborn, Friedensburh, Durlach, and Kleefeld.

The entire hromada has been occupied by Russia since Early 2022.

== History ==
The Hromada was formed on June 12, 2020 from the merger of Molochansk City Council, Dolyna Rural Council, Vynohradne Rural Council , Lahidne Rural Council and the Novomykolaivka Rural Hromada (which included the Novomykolaivka Rural Council and the Balkove Rural Council).

== See also ==
- List of hromadas of Ukraine
