= Dolyna Rural Council =

Rural council in Zaporizhzhia Oblast, Ukraine

Dolyna Rural Council Долинська сільська рада
- Rural council
- Location within Zaporizhzhia Oblast Location within Ukraine
- Coordinates: 47°9′4″N 35°33′36″E
- Country: Ukraine
- Oblast: Zaporizhzhia Oblast
- Raion: Tokmak Raion
- Established: 1963
- Disestablished: June 12, 2020
- Admin. centre: Dolyna

Area
  - Total: 3.2 km^{2} (1.2 sq mi)

Population (2001)
  - Total: 907
  - Density: 280/km^{2} (730/sq mi)
- Postal code: 71760

The Dolyna Rural Council (Ukrainian: Долинська сільська рада) was a Rural Council in Tokmak Raion, Zaporizhzhia Oblast in Southern Ukraine. Its population was 907 in the 2001 Ukrainian census.

The council's administrative centre was located in the village of Dolyna. Village councils as separate administrative divisions were abolished in 2020 and replaced with Hromadas, when the rural council was replaced with the Molochansk urban hromada.

The villages within the rural council were:

- Dolyna
- Levadne
- Liubymivka
- Rybalivka

== History ==
The rural council used to include the villages of Blahodatne, Veinavskyi, Durlach, and Vynohradne until the Vynohradne Rural Council was created in 1993.

== Demographics ==
According to the 2001 Ukrainian Census, 86.44% of the population were Ukrainian speaking, with 13.23% speaking Russian.

== Leadership ==
From 2006 to its abolition the head of the village council was Iryna Volodymyrivna Lypka, who is also the mayor of Molochansk.
