= Vynohradne, Zaporizhzhia Oblast =

Village in Zaporizhzhia Oblast, Ukraine

Vynohradne Виноградне
- Village
- Flag Seal

- Location within Zaporizhzhia Oblast Location within Ukraine
- Coordinates: 47°12′14″N 35°33′33″E
- Country: Ukraine
- Oblast: Zaporizhzhia Oblast
- Raion: Polohy Raion
- Hromada: Molochansk urban hromada
- Established: 1804

Area
  - Total: 0.842 km^{2} (0.325 sq mi)
- Elevation: 31 m (102 ft)

Population (2001)
  - Total: 410
  - Density: 490/km^{2} (1,300/sq mi)
- Postal code: 71761

Vynohradne (Ukrainian: Виноградне), formerly Alt-Nassau (Ukrainian: Альт-Нассау) is a village in Polohy Raion, Zaporizhzhia Oblast, Ukraine. Administratively, it is part of Molochansk urban hromada. In 2001 its population was 410.

== Geography ==
The village is located near the banks of the Molochna River. The village is 1 kilometre west of Molochansk, and 2 kilometres northeast of Blahodatne.

== History ==
Vynohradne was founded as Alt-Nassau in 1804 by 60 immigrant families from the County of Nassau-Usingen.

The village was renamed to Vynohradne in 1945.

The village was part of the Dolyna Rural Council until 1993 when it became part of the Vynohradne Rural Council.

The village became part of the Molochansk urban hromada on June 12, 2020, following the abolition of the Vynohradne Rural Council.

The village became part of Polohy Raion on July 19, 2020, following the abolition of Tokmak Raion.

The village has been occupied by Russia since early 2022.

== Demographics ==
According to the 1897 Russian census, there were 617 residents of the village. 322 males and 295 females, of which 82 were Orthodox, and 472 were Protestants.

According to the 2001 Ukrainian census, there were 410 residents with 89% speaking Ukrainian and 10% speaking Russian.
