= Disappearance of Clayton Kratz =

Clayton Kratz
- Born: November 5, 1896; Pennsylvania
- Disappeared: c. 1920
- Occupation: Relief worker

Clayton Kratz (November 5, 1896 – presumed 1920) was a Mennonite relief worker from the U.S. state of Pennsylvania, best known for his disappearance from the village of Halbstadt in the German Mennonite settlement of Molotschna during the Russian Civil War.

== Biography ==
Kratz was sent by the then-newly established Mennonite Central Committee. Kratz and fellow volunteers Arthur Slagel and Orie Miller were sent to investigate the needs of Mennonites who were living in the areas of the former Russian Empire, and to bring relief assistance if needed. All three people sent by the committee to serve the relief effort were still in their 20s. Kratz was 24-years-old, and younger than Slagel and Miller. He had finished his third year at Goshen College and was already engaged to be married.

The trio left the United States on September 1, 1920, heading for Constantinople (later renamed Istanbul) in the Ottoman Empire. American Mennonites had already participated in the American Committee for Relief in the Near East and were familiar with the area. The trio were expected to gather supplies in Constantinople and transport them to the areas of southern Ukraine. Due to the ongoing Russian Civil War, the operations of paramilitary bands, epidemics of malaria and typhus, and an extended drought, the local populations in southern Ukraine were running out of food supplies.

In Constantinople, it was decided that Slagel would remain in the city to organize the shipment of relief supplies, while Kratz and Miller would travel to Ukraine in person. Their destinations were Halbstadt (Molotschna) and Khortytsia (which has since been absorbed by Zaporizhia), settlements which served as administrative centers for the local colonies of Mennonites. Both settlements were in areas contested in battles between the Red Army and the White Army. The borders between the areas held by the two rival forces were at the time unstable. A paramilitary force under Nestor Makhno was also active in the area.

Kratz and Miller reached Molotschna as expected, and were able to assess the needs of the local population. They then headed north towards Khortytsia. However, military conflicts in their area made it impossible for them to reach their destination, and they retreated back to Molotschna. Miller soon left for Constantinople, but Kratz remained in Ukraine. Kratz was reportedly urged to depart the area and head for Crimea, where he would be safer. He considered such a move to be cowardly and elected to stay in Molotschna.

The Red Army soon captured Molotschna, and Kratz was arrested by the military authorities. He was released without incident, but days later Kratz was arrested for a second time. He was held with other political prisoners of the Red Army, and may have been suspected of serving as a spy for the Federal government of the United States. He was transferred with other prisoners outside the area of his capture. His further fate is unknown, but he never returned to the United States.

== Legacy ==
The story of Kratz served as an inspiration among the international Mennonite community, with a Goshen College residence hall and an educational grant program (sponsored by the Delaware Valley chapter of Mennonite Economic Development Associates (MEDA), formerly known as the Clayton Kratz Fellowship) named after him. Kratz's story is recounted in the 1971 book When Apples Are Ripe: The Story of Clayton Kratz, and the 2001 documentary A Shroud for a Journey. Kratz attended Blooming Glen Mennonite Church in Blooming Glen, Pennsylvania as a child.

== See also ==
- Attacks on humanitarian workers
- Famine relief
- Humanitarian crisis
- List of people who disappeared mysteriously (pre-1910)
