= Balkove Rural Council =

Rural council in Zaporizhzhia Oblast, Ukraine

Balkove Rural Council Балківська сільська рада
- Rural council
- Location within Zaporizhzhia Oblast Location within Ukraine
- Coordinates: 47°7′51″N 35°48′57″E
- Country: Ukraine
- Oblast: Zaporizhzhia Oblast
- Raion: Tokmak Raion
- Established: 1968
- Disestablished: June 12, 2020
- Admin. centre: Balkove

Area
  - Total: 0.365 km^{2} (0.141 sq mi)

Population (2001)
  - Total: 1,195
  - Density: 3,270/km^{2} (8,480/sq mi)
- Postal code: 71772, 71773

The Balkove Rural Council (Ukrainian: Балківська сільська рада) was a Rural Council in Tokmak Raion, Zaporizhzhia Oblast in Southern Ukraine. Its population was 1195 in the 2001 Ukrainian census.

The council's administrative centre was located in the village of Balkove. Village councils as separate administrative divisions were abolished in 2020 and replaced with Hromadas. The rural council was replaced by the short lived Novomykolaivka Rural Hromada between March 6, 2018 and June 12, 2020.

The villages within the rural council were:

- Balkove
- Hryshyne
- Kozoluhivka
- Svitle

== Leadership ==
The head of the village council from 2006 until its abolition was Olha Hryhorivna Zhydkova.
