= Fedorivka rural hromada =

Fedorivka rural hromada Федорівська селищна громада
- Hromada
- Interactive map of Fedorivka rural hromada
- Country: Ukraine
- Oblast: Zaporizhzhia Oblast
- Raion: Polohy Raion

Area
  - Total: 275.0 km^{2} (106.2 sq mi)

Population (2020)
  - Total: 3,285
  - Density: 11.95/km^{2} (30.94/sq mi)
- Settlements: 11
- Villages: 11

Fedorivka rural hromada (Ukrainian: Федорівська селищна громада) is a hromada of Ukraine, located in Polohy Raion, Zaporizhzhia Oblast. Its administrative center is the village of Fedorivka.

It has an area of 275.0 square kilometres (106.2 mi^{2}) and a population of 3,285, as of 2020.

The hromada contains 11 settlements, which are all villages:

- Balochky
- Burlatske
- Zolota Poliana
- Krasnoselivka
- Mezhyrich
- Novoselivka
- Ternove
- Fedorivka
- Khliborobne
- Chkalova
- Shevchenka

== See also ==
- List of hromadas of Ukraine
