= Vozdvyzhivka rural hromada =

Vozdvyzhivka rural hromada Воздвижівська селищна громада
- Hromada
- Interactive map of Vozdvyzhivka rural hromada
- Country: Ukraine
- Oblast: Zaporizhzhia
- Raion: Polohy
- Admin. center: Vozdvyzhivka

Area
  - Total: 246.2 km^{2} (95.1 sq mi)

Population (2020)
  - Total: 2,755
  - Density: 11.19/km^{2} (28.98/sq mi)
- Settlements: 13
- Villages: 13

Vozdvyzhivka rural hromada (Ukrainian: Воздвижівська селищна громада) is a hromada of Ukraine, located in Polohy Raion, Zaporizhzhia Oblast. Its administrative center is the village of Vozdvyzhivka.

It has an area of 246.2 square kilometres (95.1 mi^{2}) and a population of 2,755, as of 2020.

The hromada contains 13 settlements, which are all villages:

- Varvarivka
- Verkhnia Tersa
- Vozdvyzhivka
- Hirke
- Dobropillya
- Dolinka
- Kopani
- Krynychne
- Nove Zaporizhzhia
- Olenokostiantynivka
- Pryluky
- Rivne
- Tsvitkove

== See also ==
- List of hromadas of Ukraine
