= Ukrainka, Zaporizhzhia Oblast =

Village in Zaporizhzhia Oblast, Ukraine

Ukrainka Українка
- Village
- Location within Zaporizhzhia Oblast Location within Ukraine
- Coordinates: 47°9′7″N 35°41′2″E
- Country: Ukraine
- Oblast: Zaporizhzhia Oblast
- Raion: Polohy Raion
- Hromada: Molochansk urban hromada
- Established: 1930

Area
  - Total: 19.1 km^{2} (7.4 sq mi)
- Elevation: 71 m (233 ft)

Population (2001)
  - Total: 139
  - Density: 7.28/km^{2} (18.8/sq mi)
- Postal code: 71770

Ukrainka (Ukrainian: Українка) is a village in Polohy Raion, Zaporizhzhia Oblast, Ukraine. Administratively, it is part of Molochansk urban hromada. In 2001 its population was 139.

== Geography ==
The village is 7 kilometres southeast of Molochansk, 3 kilometres west of Zaporizhzhia, and 4 kilometres northwest of Novomykolaivka.

== History ==
The village was founded in 1930.

The village became part of the Molochansk urban hromada on June 12, 2020, following the abolition of the Novomykolaivka Rural Council and the Novomykolaivka Rural Hromada.

The village became part of Polohy Raion on July 19, 2020, following the abolition of Tokmak Raion.

The village has been occupied by Russia since March 2022.
