= Kuroshany =

Village in Zaporizhzhia Oblast, Ukraine

Kuroshany Курошани
- Village
- Location within Zaporizhzhia Oblast Location within Ukraine
- Coordinates: 47°6′4″N 35°40′37″E
- Country: Ukraine
- Oblast: Zaporizhzhia Oblast
- Raion: Polohy Raion
- Hromada: Molochansk urban hromada
- Established: 1923

Area
  - Total: 148.8 km^{2} (57.5 sq mi)
- Elevation: 33 m (108 ft)

Population (2001)
  - Total: 383
  - Density: 2.57/km^{2} (6.67/sq mi)
- Postal code: 71771

Kuroshany (Ukrainian: Курошани) is a village in Polohy Raion, Zaporizhzhia Oblast, Ukraine. Administratively, it is part of Molochansk urban hromada. In 2001 its population was 383.

== Geography ==
The village is located on the banks of the Kuroshany River. The village is 10 kilometres southeast of Molochansk, and 500 metres away from Novomykolaivka.

== History ==
The village was founded in 1923.

The village became part of the Molochansk urban hromada on June 12, 2020, following the abolition of the Novomykolaivka Rural Council and the Novomykolaivka Rural Hromada.

The village became part of Polohy Raion on July 19, 2020, following the abolition of Tokmak Raion.

The village has been occupied by Russia since early 2022.

== Famous people ==
- Viktor Mytrofanovych Kostiukevych, Ukrainian scientist and former head coach of the Ukraine national football team
