= Vykhodnoy =

Vykhodnoy Выходной
- Railway station
- Interactive map of Vykhodnoy
- Location of Vykhodnoy Vykhodnoy (Murmansk Oblast)
- Coordinates: 68°50′03″N 33°03′24″E
- Country: Russia
- Federal subject: Murmansk Oblast
- Administrative district: Kolsky District
- Urban-type settlementSelsoviet: Molochny

Population (2010 Census)
  - Total: 37
  - Estimate (2025): 8 (−78.4%)

Municipal status
  - Municipal district: Kolsky Municipal District
  - Urban settlement: Molochny Urban Settlement
- Time zone: UTC+3 (MSK)
- Postal code: 184365
- Dialing code: +7 81553
- OKTMO ID: 47605161106

Vykhodnoy (Russian: Выходно́й) is a rural locality (a railway station) under the administrative jurisdiction of the urban-type settlement of Molochny in Kolsky District of Murmansk Oblast, Russia, located beyond the Arctic Circle. Population: 37 (2010 Census).
