= Novomykolaivka Rural Council =

Rural council in Zaporizhzhia Oblast, Ukraine

Novomykolaivka Rural Council Новомиколаївська сільська рада
- Rural council
- Location within Zaporizhzhia Oblast Location within Ukraine
- Coordinates: 47°6′23″N 35°42′48″E
- Country: Ukraine
- Oblast: Zaporizhzhia Oblast
- Raion: Tokmak Raion
- Disestablished: June 12, 2020
- Admin. centre: Novomykolaivka

Area
  - Total: 406.6 km^{2} (157.0 sq mi)

Population (2001)
  - Total: 2,907
  - Density: 7.150/km^{2} (18.52/sq mi)
- Postal code: 71760

The Novomykolaivka Rural Council (Ukrainian: Новомиколаївська сільська рада) was a Rural Council in Tokmak Raion, Zaporizhzhia Oblast in Southern Ukraine. Its population was 2907 in the 2001 Ukrainian census.

The council's administrative centre was located in the village of Novomykolaivka. Village councils as separate administrative divisions were abolished in 2020 and replaced with Hromadas, when the council was replaced by the short lived Novomykolaivka Rural Hromada between March 6, 2018 and June 12, 2020.

The villages within the rural council were:

- Hroznyi
- Kuroshany
- Mostove
- Novomykolaivka
- Ukrainka
- Vesele
- Yefymivna
- Zaporizhzhia

And three former villages: Neuborn, Friedensburh and Neuheim

== Leadership ==
- Nataliia Ivanivna Chekmarova, 2006–2010
- Volodymyr Oleksandrovych Zaloznyy, 2010–2020
