= Jakob Reimer =

Concentration camp guard (1918–2005)

- Born: November 6, 1918; Friedensdorf, Molotschna, Russian Empire (now Khmelnytske, Ukraine)
- Died: August 3, 2005 (aged 86); Fort Lee, New Jersey
- Occupation: Trawniki camp guard

Jakob (Jack) Reimer (November 6, 1918 – August 3, 2005) was a Trawniki camp guard who later emigrated to the United States and became a salesman and restaurant manager.

== Biography ==
=== Early life in USSR ===
Born to Russian Mennonite parents in Friedensdorf, Molotschna, Russian Empire (now Khmelnytske, Ukraine), Reimer studied to be a librarian.

=== Second World War ===
In 1940, Reimer was drafted into the Soviet Army. When Germany invaded the Soviet Union on June 22, 1941, Reimer entered combat and was captured by German forces on July 6. Two months later, due to his German heritage and language skills, he was recruited to the Trawniki concentration camp for training as a camp guard.

While serving as a camp guard, Reimer participated in the liquidation of Jewish ghettos in Poland, in addition to administrative and office duties. On one occasion, Reimer fired a shot while at a pit containing corpses and at least one live civilian, which would later prove pivotal in his US denaturalization trial. In 1944, he received a War Merit Cross for his service, and was promoted to SS Senior Platoon Guard (SS-Oberzugwachmann) in 1945.

In 1944, Reimer gained German citizenship after Adolf Hitler made all ethnic German military and police personnel eligible for German citizenship.

=== United States ===
In 1952, Reimer applied for a visa to the United States and was naturalized as a United States citizen on April 28, 1959. During his time in the United States, he worked as a Wise potato chip salesman and a restaurant manager, and lived in Brooklyn, New York. After he retired, he moved to Carmel, New York, and was living in Fort Lee, New Jersey at the time of his death.

Reimer was first investigated by American authorities in 1980 in connection with the John Demjanjuk case, but minimal progress was made during this initial investigation. Not until the fall of the Soviet Union and the end of Communism in the Eastern Bloc did investigators make substantial progress, as formerly restricted archives were opened up to Western historians. In 1992 the Office of Special Investigations filed a denaturalization suit against Reimer, and following a bench trial in 1998, Reimer was denaturalized on September 5, 2002. He appealed his denaturalization, but the United States Court of Appeals for the Second Circuit upheld it on January 27, 2004. In 2005, the government sought to deport Reimer, and he agreed to leave for Germany, but he died before his deportation could be completed.

== In literature ==
Reimer, who was Trawniki recruit No. 865, figured predominantly in Citizen 865: The Hunt for Hitler's Hidden Soldiers in America (listed below).

== Sources ==
- Steinhart, Eric C. (2009). "The Chameleon of Trawniki: Jack Reimer, Soviet Volksdeutsche, and the Holocaust". Holocaust and Genocide Studies. 23 (2): 239–262. doi:10.1093/hgs/dcp032 – via Project MUSE 90 (abstract and for-pay access to article).
- Goldberg, Jeffrey (March 14, 1994). "The Nazi Next Door". The New Yorker. Vol. 27, no. 11. pp. 32–38.
- "United States v. Reimer, US Court of Appeals, Second Circuit, argued August 6, 2003, decided January 27, 2004". openjurist.org.
- Barry, Dan (September 17, 2005). "About New York; A Face Seen and Unseen on the Subway". The New York Times. Access by free subscription (January 2021).
- "Nazis Captured in the United States". parade.com. May 24, 2009.
- Miner, Colin (June 14, 2005). "Onetime Nazi Guard Who Settled In Brooklyn Misses Court Date". The New York Sun. Archived from the original on June 9, 2021.
- Rosenbaum, Eli M. (April 11, 2013). "Director of Human Rights Enforcement Strategy and Policy for the Criminal Division's Human Rights and Special Prosecutions Section Eli M. Rosenbaum Speaks at the U.S. Holocaust Memorial Museum's 2013 Days of Remembrance". Washington, DC: U.S. Department of Justice. "We found Jakob Reimer living the American dream in a New York City suburb, and we brought him to justice. When I questioned him, he confessed that he had led a platoon of men on a mission to, in his words, "exterminate a labor camp." We will never know the names of those who were massacred by Reimer and his men, but we know that they too did not live to see justice done."
- Cenziper, Debbie (2019). Citizen 865: The Hunt for Hitler's Hidden Soldiers in America. Hachette Books. ISBN 978-0-316-44965-6.
- "[title lost since edit]" (PDF). FindLaw Legal Blogs. Thomson Reuters. Archived from the original (PDF) on September 29, 2011.
- "[title lost since edit]". accessmylibrary.com.
- "[title lost since edit]". accessmylibrary.com.
