= Niedźwiedzica, Pomeranian Voivodeship =

Niedźwiedzica
- Village
- Location within Poland
- Coordinates: 54°15′40″N 18°59′22″E
- Country: Poland
- Voivodeship: Pomeranian
- County: Nowy Dwór
- Gmina: Stegna
- Population: 242

Niedźwiedzica [ɲɛd͡ʑvjɛˈd͡ʑit͡sa] is a village in the administrative district of Gmina Stegna, within Nowy Dwór County, Pomeranian Voivodeship, in northern Poland.

Before 1793 the area was part of Kingdom of Poland, 1793-1919 Prussia and Germany, 1920-1939 Free City of Danzig, September 1939 - February 1945 Nazi Germany. For the history of the region, see History of Pomerania.

== Notable residents ==
- Johann Cornies (1789–1848), Mennonite German settler to Russia
