= Rozivka settlement hromada =

Rozivka settlement hromada Розівська селищна громада
- Hromada
- Interactive map of Rozivka settlement hromada
- Country: Ukraine
- Oblast: Zaporizhzhia Oblast
- Raion: Polohy Raion

Area
  - Total: 610.5 km^{2} (235.7 sq mi)

Population (2020)
  - Total: 8,107
  - Density: 13.28/km^{2} (34.39/sq mi)
- Settlements: 28
- Rural settlements: 2
- Villages: 25
- Towns: 1

Rozivka settlement hromada (Ukrainian: Розівська селищна громада) is a hromada of Ukraine, located in Polohy Raion, Zaporizhzhia Oblast. Its administrative center is the town of Rozivka.

It has an area of 610.5 square kilometres (235.7 mi^{2}) and a population of 8107, as of 2020.

The hromada includes 28 settlements: 1 town (Rozivka) and 25 villages:

- Antonivka
- Bahativka
- Bilovezh
- Verkhivka
- Vyshniuvate
- Vilne
- Zaporizhzhia
- Zelenopil
- Zoria
- Zoriane
- Ivanivka
- Kobylne
- Kuznetsivka
- Lystvianka
- Luhanske
- Marynopil
- Nadiine
- Novhorod
- Novodvorivka
- Novozlatopil
- Novomlynivka
- Pershotravneve
- Sviatotroitske
- Solodkovodne
- Forois

And 2 rural-type settlements: Azov and Myrne.

== See also ==
- List of hromadas of Ukraine
