= Molochny =

Molochny Молочный
- Urban-type settlement
- Interactive map of Molochny
- Location of Molochny Molochny (Murmansk Oblast)
- Coordinates: 68°50′N 33°00′E
- Country: Russia
- Federal subject: Murmansk Oblast
- Administrative district: Kolsky District
- Elevation: 51 m (167 ft)

Population (2010 Census)
  - Total: 5,208
  - Estimate (2025): 3,956 (−24%)

Municipal status
  - Municipal district: Kolsky Municipal District
  - Urban settlement: Molochny Urban Settlement
- Time zone: UTC+3 (MSK)
- Postal code: 184365
- Dialing code: +7 81553
- OKTMO ID: 47605161051

Molochny (Russian: Моло́чный) is an urban locality (an urban-type settlement) in Kolsky District of Murmansk Oblast, Russia, located on the Kola Peninsula on the lower Kola River, 15 kilometers (9.3 mi) south of Murmansk. Population: 5,208 (2010 census); 5,627 (2002 census); 5,878 (1989 Soviet census).

It was founded as a work settlement around 1935.

== See also ==
- Vykhodnoy
- Molochna, a Ukrainian River
