= Preobrazhenka rural hromada =

Preobrazhenka rural hromada Преображенська селищна громада
- Hromada
- Interactive map of Preobrazhenka rural hromada
- Country: Ukraine
- Oblast: Zaporizhzhia Oblast
- Raion: Polohy Raion
- Admin. center: Preobrazhenka

Area
  - Total: 366.0 km^{2} (141.3 sq mi)

Population (2020)
  - Total: 5,353
  - Density: 14.63/km^{2} (37.88/sq mi)
- Settlements: 15
- Villages: 15

Preobrazhenka rural hromada (Ukrainian: Преображенська селищна громада) is a hromada of Ukraine, located in Polohy Raion, Zaporizhzhia Oblast. Its administrative center is the village of Preobrazhenka.

It has an area of 366.0 square kilometres (141.3 mi^{2}) and a population of 5,353, as of 2020.

The hromada contains 15 settlements, which are all villages:

- Vasylivske
- Vasynivka
- Vilianka
- Yehorivka
- Mykilske
- Novoselivka
- Novosoloshyne
- Obshche
- Omelnyk
- Preobrazhenka
- Svoboda
- Tymoshivka
- Chervona Krynytsia
- Chervonyi Yar
- Shyroke

== See also ==
- List of hromadas of Ukraine
