= Dolyna, Zaporizhzhia Oblast =

Village in Zaporizhzhia Oblast, Ukraine

Dolyna Долина
- Village
- Tsentralna Street

- Location within Zaporizhzhia Oblast Location within Ukraine
- Coordinates: 47°9′4″N 35°33′36″E
- Country: Ukraine
- Oblast: Zaporizhzhia Oblast
- Raion: Polohy Raion
- Hromada: Molochansk urban hromada
- Established: 1804

Area
  - Total: 0.92 km^{2} (0.36 sq mi)
- Elevation: 26 m (85 ft)

Population (2001)
  - Total: 305
  - Density: 330/km^{2} (860/sq mi)
- Postal code: 71760

Dolyna (Ukrainian: Долина), formerly Schönau (Ukrainian: Шенау) is a village in Polohy Raion, Zaporizhzhia Oblast, Ukraine. Administratively, it is part of Molochansk urban hromada. In 2001 its population was 305.

== Geography ==
Dolyna is located 1.5 kilometres away from the Molochna River, 1.5 kilometres southwest of Levadne, 1.4 kilometres northeast of Rybalivka, and 5 kilometres southwest of Molochansk.

== History ==
Burial mounds from the Bronze Age, Sarmatian,and Polovtsian periods have been excavated nearby the village.

Dolyna was founded as Schönau in 1804 by 21 Flemish Mennonite families from Prussia as part of the Molotschna Colony.

A forest was planted in the village in 1832.

The village had a brickyard, a windmill, a grocery store, and a cloth dye works. Later, there was also an agricultural machine factory.

The village became part of the Roza Lyuksemburh Collective Farm in 1930.

The German Mennonite residents left the village to Germany in 1943, and only a few Mennonite buildings remain.

The village was renamed to Dolyna in 1945.

The village became part of Molochansk urban hromada on June 12, 2020, following the abolition of Dolyna Rural Council, which the village was the centre of.

The village became part of Polohy Raion on July 19, 2020, following the abolition of Tokmak Raion.

The village has been occupied by Russia since February 2022.

== Monuments ==
There is a 150 year old Pedunculate Oak at 56 Tsentralna Street, a 200 year old Pedunculate Oak at 28 Tsentralna Street, a centuries old Pedunculate Oak at 68 Tsentralna Street, ans two 120 year old Pedunculate Oaks, all of which are historical monuments of local importance.

== Demographics ==
The population of the village in 1908 was 419.

The population of the village in 2001 was 305, of which 280 spoke Ukrainian, 23 spoke russian, and 2 spoke other.

== Transport ==
The P85 Highway passes through the village, as well as the Fedorivka–Verkhnii Tokmak II–Volnovakha railway line, although there is no station.
