= Johann Cornies =

German Mennonite settler in Russia (1789–1848)

Johann(es) Cornies (20 June 1789 – 13 March 1848) was a Prussian Mennonite settler in the Russian Empire, who became an important agricultural and architectural reformer for the Mennonites, Hutterites and other minorities in the Russian Empire. He founded the village of Neu-Halbstadt in 1843.

== Personal life ==
Cornies was born in the Vistula delta Mennonite settlement of Bärwalde (Niedźwiedzica), near Danzig (Gdańsk) in West Prussia. He was a son of Johann Cornies (born in Mühlhausen, East Prussia) and Aganetha Cornies. He had 3 brothers; Peter Cornies (1791-1840s), David Cornies (1794-1850s), and Heinrich Cornies (1806-?). In 1804, his family moved to Molotschna, a Mennonite settlement in what is now Ukraine, but then was part of the Russian Empire. He married Agnes Klassen (1792-1840s), and they had a son and a daughter named after each of them. He died at Orloff, a village in the Molotschna colony.

== Agricultural reformer ==
Cornies was the first president of The Agricultural Improvement Society, an Odesa-based commission that supported German colonists. The organization introduced modern farming practices to the colonies and later extended its reach to education and social life. The commission was sponsored by the Russian government with the hope that the master farming techniques of the Mennonites could be introduced to Jewish, Tatar and Russian villages. The society introduced dryland farming, use of fertilizer, and four-year crop rotation. Planting tobacco and mulberry trees for sericulture were promoted.

Cornies owned a large estate, Juschanlee, a model farm and showplace of south Russia. Crown princes Alexander I and Alexander II, as well as other government officials, visited the estate. His holdings were expanded by gifts from the government for his services and totaled 100 km^{2} (25,000 acres) at his death. He owned a large herd of thoroughbred cattle, 8,000 merino sheep, and 400 horses.

He organized the resettlement of the Hutterites from Radichev to Hutterthal and Johannesruh.

Cornies helped also in the establishment of agricultural colonies for Jews, the so-called "Judenplan". His aid was also given to the Molokans and to the Dukhobors.
