= Lahidne =

Village in Zaporizhzhia Oblast, Ukraine

Lahidne Лагідне
- Village
- Location within Zaporizhzhia Oblast Location within Ukraine
- Coordinates: 47°2′51″N 35°43′58″E
- Country: Ukraine
- Oblast: Zaporizhzhia Oblast
- Raion: Polohy Raion
- Hromada: Molochansk urban hromada
- Established: 1836

Area
  - Total: 0.674 km^{2} (0.260 sq mi)
- Elevation: 39 m (128 ft)

Population (2001)
  - Total: 883
  - Density: 1,310/km^{2} (3,390/sq mi)
- Postal code: 71774

Lahidne (Ukrainian: Лагідне), formerly Juschanlee (Ukrainian: Юшанли), Mohutnyi (Ukrainian: Могутний), and Kirove (Ukrainian: Кірове) is a village in Polohy Raion, Zaporizhzhia Oblast, Ukraine. Administratively, it is part of Molochansk urban hromada. In 2001 its population was 883.

There is a secondary school in the village with 303 students and 24 teachers, a community centre with a 450 seat auditorium, a first aid post, a nursery, post office, café, canteen, shopping centre, savings bank, a telephone exchange and two libraries with 12,215 books.

== Geography ==
The village is located on the banks of the Yushanly River. The village is 17 kilometres southeast of Molochansk, 1.8 kilometres northeast of Zoriane, and adjacent to Mohutnie.

== History ==
Lahidne was founded in 1836 as Juschanlee, the private estate of Johann Cornies as part of the Molotschna Colony. The land had been gifted to Cornies in 1836 by Nicholas I of Russia. Upon Cornies death in 1848, the estate passed to his daughter, Agnes Wiebe. The estate had 438,707 trees and was a Model farm, which Alexander I of Russia and Alexander II of Russia both visited. The Juschanlee Estate was sold to Heinrich Reimer in 1879 who built a large house, as well as many statues of the Reimer family.

A brick factory was built in the farm in 1845.

The farm was taken by the Soviet Union in January 1918.

The farm was reorganized into the Mohutnyi Collective Farm in 1922, and it became a state breeding farm for Cattle in 1927, and became one of the largest breeding farms in Ukraine.

The farm was renamed to Kirove in 1935 after Sergei Kirov, and the farm was later known as Kirove Khutir.

115 residents of the village fought in World War II, with 73 died, and 68 awarded medals.

The Khutir became a village in 1958.

Many of the former estate buildings were demolished in the 1970s after a long period of deterioration, while the main house was used as a home for war veterans, and in 1997 became a Psychiatric hospital.

The village was renamed to Lahidne in 2016 due to Decommunization.

The village became part of the Molochansk urban hromada on June 12, 2020, following the abolition of the Lahidne Rural Council.

The village became part of Polohy Raion on July 19, 2020, following the abolition of Tokmak Raion.

The village has been occupied by Russia since March 2022.

== Monuments ==
- A statue to Sergei Kirov stands in the centre of the village.
- 130 year old Oak tree.

== Demographics ==
According to the 2001 Ukrainian census, the village had a population of 168. 84% spoke Ukrainian and 14% spoke Russian.
