= Novomykolaivka, Polohy Raion, Zaporizhzhia Oblast =

Village in Zaporizhzhia Oblast, Ukraine

Novomykolaivka Новомиколаївка
- Village
- Location within Zaporizhzhia Oblast Location within Ukraine
- Coordinates: 47°6′23″N 35°42′48″E
- Country: Ukraine
- Oblast: Zaporizhzhia Oblast
- Raion: Polohy Raion
- Hromada: Molochansk urban hromada
- Established: 1922

Area
  - Total: 85.8 km^{2} (33.1 sq mi)
- Elevation: 44 m (144 ft)

Population (2001)
  - Total: 704
  - Density: 8.21/km^{2} (21.3/sq mi)
- Postal code: 71771

Novomykolaivka (Ukrainian: Новомиколаївка), formerly Hrozne-Yukhymivka (Ukrainian: Грозне-Юхимівка) is a village in Polohy Raion, Zaporizhzhia Oblast, Ukraine. Administratively, it is part of Molochansk urban hromada. In 2001 its population was 704.

== Geography ==
The village is located on the banks of the Kuroshany River. The village is 10 kilometres southeast of Molochansk, just over half a kilometre west of Mostove, 4 kilometres southwest of Zaporizhzhia, and 500 metres away from Kuroshany.

== History ==
The village was founded in 1922 by immigrants from Chernihivka Raion as Hrozne-Yukhymivka.

There is a mass grave in the village of Soviet soldiers from World War II.

The village was renamed to Novomykolaivka in 1968.

The village became part of the Molochansk urban hromada on June 12, 2020, following the abolition of the Novomykolaivka Rural Council and the Novomykolaivka Rural Hromada.

The village became part of Polohy Raion on July 19, 2020, following the abolition of Tokmak Raion.

The village has been occupied by Russia since early 2022.

== Demographics ==
According to the 2001 Ukrainian census, there were 704 residents of the village. 649 spoke Ukrainian, 51 spoke Russian, 1 spoke Moldovan, 1 spoke Bulgarian, 1 spoke Belarusian, and 1 spoke other.
