= Molochna =

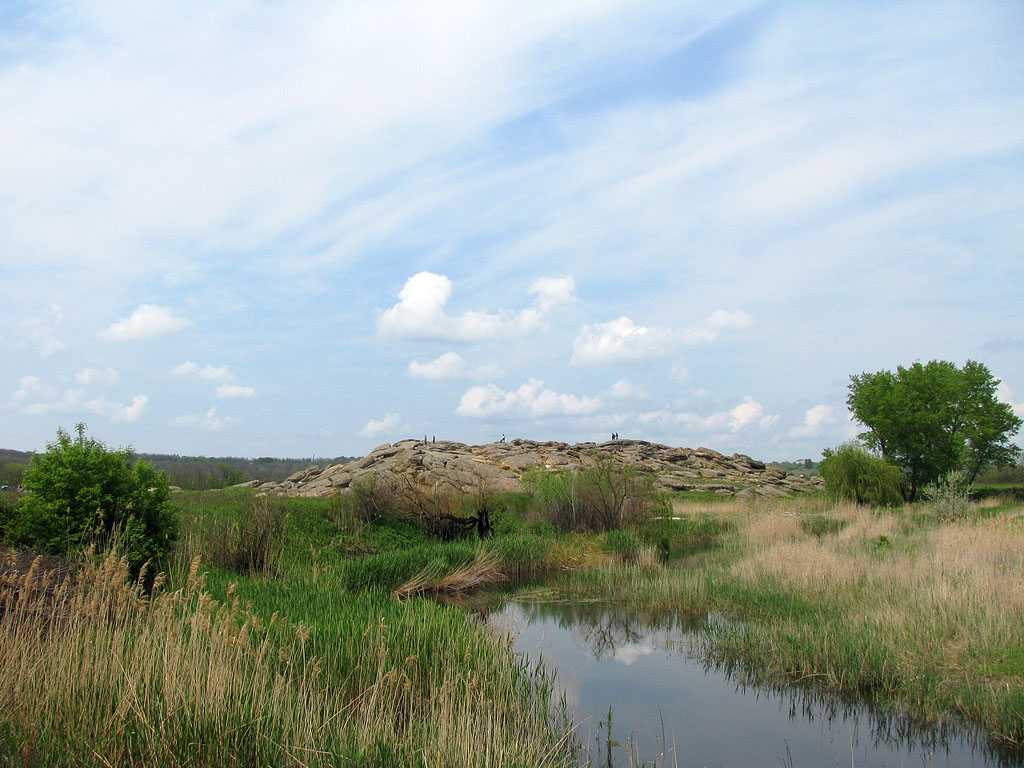
- Native name: Молочна (Ukrainian)

Location
- Country: Ukraine

Physical characteristics
- Source
  - location: Zaporizhzhia Oblast, Ukraine
- Mouth
  - location: Sea of Azov
  - coordinates: 46.7014°N 35.2986°E
- Length: 197 km (122 mi)
- Basin size: 3,450 km^{2} (1,330 sq mi)

The Molochna (Ukrainian: Молочна, lit. 'milky'; Russian: Молочная, romanized: Molochnaya) is a river in Zaporizhzhia Oblast, southern Ukraine. The river is connected with the Russian Mennonite culture, once based in the southeastern region of Ukraine since 1804 as Molotschna colony which was part of the Russian Empire at that time.

In antiquity the river was called Gerrhus or Gerrus (Ancient Greek: Γέρρος). The river was called Tokmak (Nogai: Токмак) by the Nogais.

The Molochna is formed by the confluence of the Chynhul and Tokmak rivers, just north of Molochansk. It flows roughly southwards, through Melitopol and into the Molochnyi Estuary in the Azov Sea. Its length is 197 kilometres (122 mi) and its drainage basin is 3,450 km^{2}. A former island in the river contains the archaeological site of Kamyana Mohyla.

== Cities and towns in the watershed ==
- Melitopol
- Molochansk
- Tokmak

== See also ==
- Molotschna
- Molochny, near Murmansk
