= Tokmak Raion =

Former subdivision of Zaporizhzhia Oblast, Ukraine

Tokmak Raion Токмацький район
- Raion
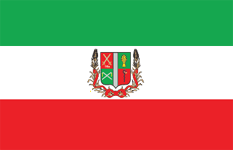
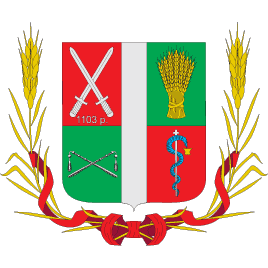
- Flag Coat of arms

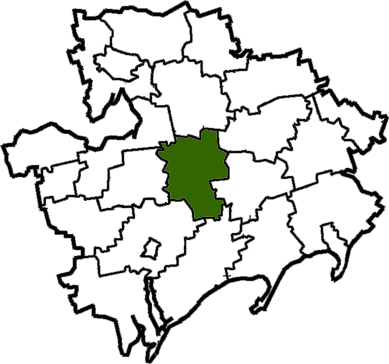
- Coordinates: 47°11′29.63″N 35°42′33.46″E
- Country: Ukraine
- Oblast: Zaporizhzhia Oblast
- Established: March 1923
- Disestablished: 18 July 2020
- Admin. center: Tokmak
- Subdivisions: 2 hromadas

Area
  - Total: 1,400 km^{2} (540 sq mi)

Population (2020)
  - Total: 21,330 ▼
  - Density: 15/km^{2} (39/sq mi)
- Time zone: UTC+02:00 (EET)
  - Summer (DST): UTC+03:00 (EEST)
- Postal index: 71716—71775
- Area code: +380 6178

Tokmak Raion (Ukrainian: Токмацький район) was one of the raions (districts) of Zaporizhzhia Oblast in southern Ukraine between 1923 and 2020. The administrative center of the region was the small city of Tokmak. Before 1962, it was known as Velykyi Tokmak Raion (Ukrainian: Великотокмацький район). The last estimate of the raion population was 21,330 (2020 est.).

== Geography ==
The raion had an area of 1,400 square kilometres (540 mi^{2}), with 1,103,000 hectares of arable land.

== History ==
The raion was established in March 1923 as Velykyi Tokmak Raion, as Velykyi Tokmak was still the name of Tokmak at the time. It was located within Melitopol Okruha of Yekaterinoslav Governorate in the Ukrainian Soviet Socialist Republic. The okruhas were abolished at the end of the 1920s, and Velykyi Tokmak Raion was assigned to Dnipropetrovsk Oblast. On 10 January 1939, part of Dnipropetrovsk Oblast's territory was split off, and Velykyi Tokmak Raion became part of the newly created Zaporizhzhia Oblast. In December 1962, Velykyi Tokmak was renamed to Tokmak, and Velykyi Tokmak Raion was renamed Tokmak Raion accordingly. Tokmak was also designated a city of oblast significance - meaning that while it still served as the administrative center of the raion, it was no longer part of it, instead being subordinated directly to Zaporizhzhia Oblast.

The administrative structure of Tokmak Raion was reformed on 12 June 2020, with the division of it into two hromadas: Tokmak urban hromada and Molochansk urban hromada. Tokmak was once again subordinated to Tokmak Raion, as the city of oblast significance designation was abolished. Tokmak Raion was abolished on 18 July 2020 as part of the administrative reform of Ukraine, which reduced the number of raions of Zaporizhzhia Oblast to five. The area of the former Tokmak Raion was merged into Polohy Raion.

== Demographics ==
Population history
Year	1970	2011	2020
Pop.	34,600	24,090	21,330
±% p.a.	—	−0.88%	−1.34%
All statistics exclude Tokmak proper.

As of January 1, 2020, the raion had an estimated population of 21,330 people. Of these, 6,327 lived in the only city in the raion Molochansk, and 15,003 lived in rural areas outside Molochansk.
