= Polohy Raion =

Subdivision of Zaporizhzhia Oblast, Ukraine

Polohy Raion Пологівський район
- Raion
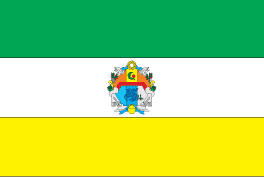
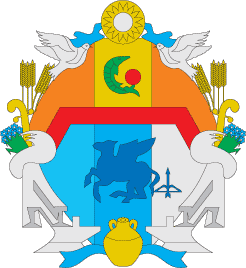
- Flag Coat of arms
- Interactive map of Polohy Raion
- Coordinates: 47°30′2.29″N 36°22′52.95″E
- Country: Ukraine
- Oblast: Zaporizhzhia Oblast
- Established: 1923
- Admin. center: Polohy
- Subdivisions: 15 hromadas

Government
  - Governor: Yuriy Kovalenko; Alexey Salmin (Russian-installed)

Area
  - Total: 6,762.5 km^{2} (2,611.0 sq mi)

Population (2022)
  - Total: 163,641
  - Density: 24.198/km^{2} (62.673/sq mi)
- Time zone: UTC+02:00 (EET)
  - Summer (DST): UTC+03:00 (EEST)
- Postal index: 70600—70661
- Area code: +380 6165
- Website: https://pologyokrug.gosuslugi.ru/ (Russian administration)

Polohy Raion (Ukrainian: Пологівський район) is one of the five raions (districts) of Zaporizhzhia Oblast in southern Ukraine. The administrative center of the region is the town of Polohy. Population: 163,641 (2022 estimate).

On 18 July 2020, as part of the administrative reform of Ukraine, the number of raions of Zaporizhzhia Oblast was reduced to five, and the area of Polohy Raion was significantly expanded by absorbing the , Huliaipole, Tokmak, Chernihivka, Rozivka Raions and most of the Orikhiv as well as the city of Polohy, which was previously incorporated as a city of Oblast significance. The January 2020 estimate of the raion population was 38,636 (2020 est.).

During the Russian invasion of Ukraine, part of the raion has been occupied by Russia.

== Administrative divisions ==
Number of settlements 240. Number of cities ― 5 (Huliaipole, Molochansk, Orikhiv, Polohy, Tokmak). Zhmerynka Raion includes 15 territorial communities. The raion contains seventeen hromadas:

- Fedorivka rural hromada
- Huliaipole urban hromada
- Kamianka settlement hromada
- Komysh-Zoria settlement hromada
- Mala Tokmachka rural hromada
- Malynivka rural hromada
- Molochansk urban hromada
- Orikhiv urban hromada
- Polohy urban hromada
- Preobrazhenka rural hromada
- Rozivka settlement hromada
- Smyrnove rural hromada
- Tokmak urban hromada
- Voskresenka rural hromada
- Vozdvyzhivka rural hromada

== Geography ==
Polohy Raion is located on the Dnieper Lowland and the Azov Upland. The area of the district is 6 762.5 km^{2}.

Typical landscapes for Polohy Raion are steppes on chernozems. There are salt marshes. Steppe vegetation, due to plowing, has been preserved mainly on the slopes of river valleys and gullies.

The left tributaries of the Dnieper flow through the Polohy Raion.

The climate of the district is temperate continental with dry periods. According to the Köppen-Geiger climate classification, the climate of the Polohy Raion is humid continental with warm summers (Dfb).

There are deposits of brown coal, clay, kaolinite, sand, manganese ores in the Polohy Raion.

== Notable landmarks ==
The National Historical and Archaeological Reserve "Kamyana Mohyla" have been created in the Polohy Raion.

== Transport ==
Polohy Raion is crossed by railways and highways. The largest transport hubs Tokmak and Polohy, through which roads pass in the direction of Zaporizhzhia.

== Bibliography ==
- Національний атлас України/НАН України, Інститут географії, Державна служба геодезії, картографії та кадастру; голов. ред. Л. Г. Руденко; голова ред. кол.Б.Є. Патон. — К.: ДНВП «Картографія», 2007. — 435 с. — 5 тис.прим. — ISBN 978-966-475-067-4.
- Географічна енциклопедія України : [у 3 т.] / редкол.: О. М. Маринич (відповід. ред.) та ін. — К., 1989—1993. — 33 000 екз. — ISBN 5-88500-015-8.
