= Ocheretuvate =

Ocheretuvate (Ukrainian: Очеретувате) can mean any of a number of villages in Ukraine:

== Dnipropetrovsk Oblast ==
- Ocheretuvate, Mahdalynivka Raion, Dnipropetrovsk Oblast
- Ocheretuvate, Synelnykove Raion, Dnipropetrovsk Oblast
- Ocheretuvate, Vasylkivka Raion, Dnipropetrovsk Oblast

== Poltava Oblast ==
- Ocheretuvate, Poltava Oblast

== Zaporizhzhia Oblast ==
- Ocheretuvate, Kamianka settlement hromada, Polohy Raion, Zaporizhzhia Oblast
- Ocheretuvate, Tokmak urban hromada, Polohy Raion, Zaporizhzhia Oblast
