= Bilmak Raion =

Former subdivision of Zaporizhzhia Oblast, Ukraine

Bilmak Raion Більмацький район
- Raion
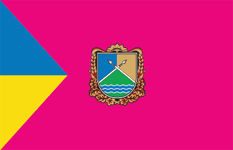
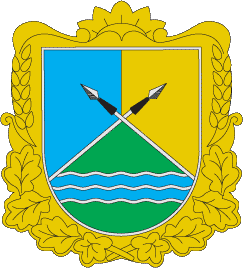
- Flag Coat of arms

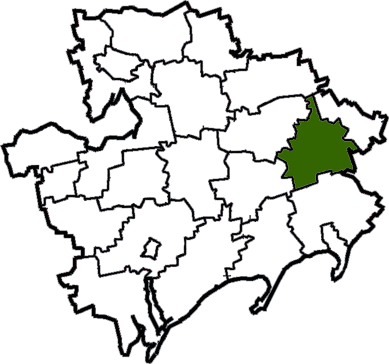
- Coordinates: 47°20′31.25″N 36°44′29.58″E
- Country: Ukraine
- Oblast: Zaporizhzhia Oblast
- Established: March 1923
- Disestablished: 18 July 2020
- Admin. center: Bilmak
- Subdivisions: 4 hromadas

Area
  - Total: 1,300 km^{2} (500 sq mi)

Population (2020)
  - Total: 20,922
  - Density: 16/km^{2} (42/sq mi)
- Time zone: UTC+02:00 (EET)
  - Summer (DST): UTC+03:00 (EEST)
- Postal index: 71000—71053
- Area code: +380 6147

Bilmak Raion (Ukrainian: Більмацький район) was one of the raions (districts) of Zaporizhzhia Oblast in southern Ukraine from 1923 until 2020. The administrative center of the region was the urban-type settlement of Bilmak (now Kamianka).

Like its administrative center, it was renamed numerous times during the 20th century. It was eventually abolished in 2020, and its territory merged into Polohy Raion.

== Geography ==
Bilmak Raion had an area of 1,300 square kilometres (500 mi^{2}). Its terrain is mainly undulating plains, which are cut through by rivers at points, including the Konka river. The raion was located in the Azov Uplands.

== History ==
The raion was established in March 1923 as Tsarekostiantynivka Raion, (Note: Ukrainian: Царекостянтинівський район) at a time when its center was still known as Tsarekostiantynivka. At the time of its creation, it was located in Berdiansk Okruha. In 1925, it was transferred to Mariupol Okruha. In January 1926, when Tsarekostiantynivka was renamed to Pershotravneve, the raion was renamed to Pershotravneve Raion. In 1930, the okruhas were abolished and Pershotravneve Raion was subordinated directly to the Ukrainian Soviet Socialist Republic. This was changed in 1932, when it was included in Dnipropetrovsk Oblast. In 1935, when the village was renamed yet again to Kuibysheve, the raion was renamed again to Kuibysheve Raion (Note: Ukrainian: Куйбишевський район) - both after the Soviet political figure Valerian Kuybyshev. In 1939, Kuibysheve Raion was finally transferred to Zaporizhzhia Oblast, where it would remain until its dissolution.

During World War II, Kuibysheve Raion was occupied by Nazi Germany between October 1941 and September 1943. In 1970, the raion had a population of 53,400 people, of whom 15,300 were urban and 38,100 were rural.

On 21 May 2016, Verkhovna Rada adopted decision to rename Kuibysheve Raion to Bilmak Raion and Kuibysheve to Bilmak according to the law prohibiting names of communist origin. The raion was abolished on 18 July 2020 as part of the administrative reform of Ukraine, which reduced the number of raions of Zaporizhzhia Oblast to five. The area of Bilmak Raion was merged into Polohy Raion. The last estimate of the raion population was 20,922 (2020 est.).

== Administrative divisions ==
At the time of its dissolution, Bilmak Raion contained four hromadas:

- Bilmak settlement hromada, centered in Bilmak
- Komysh-Zoria settlement hromada, centered in the town Komysh-Zoria
- Novoukrainka rural hromada, centered in the village Novoukrainka
- Smyrnove rural hromada, centered in the village Smyrnove

== Demographics ==
Population history
Year	Pop.	±% p.a.
1970	53,400	—
2001	27,578	−2.11%
2015	22,757	−1.36%
2020	20,922	−1.67%

According to the 2001 Ukrainian census, Bilmak Raion had a population of 27,578 people, of whom the majority were ethnically Ukrainians. There were also minorities of ethnic Russians (12%) and Greeks (1%).

The raion had multiple religious communities, including the Ukrainian Orthodox Church – Kyiv Patriarchate, Ukrainian Orthodox Church (Moscow Patriarchate), Evangelical Baptist Christians, Jehovah's Witnesses, and Seventh-day Adventists.
