= Ladivka =

Village formerly in Zaporizhzhia Oblast, Ukraine

Ladivka Ладівка
- Former village
- Location within Zaporizhzhia Oblast Location within Ukraine
- Coordinates: 47°14′04″N 35°40′08″E
- Country: Ukraine
- Oblast: Zaporizhzhia Oblast
- Raion: Polohy Raion
- Hromada: Tokmak urban hromada
- Established: 1806

Area
  - Total: 0.3 km^{2} (0.12 sq mi)

Population (1914)
  - Total: 460
  - Density: 1,500/km^{2} (4,000/sq mi)
- Postal code: 71700

Ladivka (Ukrainian: Ладівка), formerly known as Ladekopp (Ukrainian: Ладекоп; German: Ladekopp) and Sadove (Ukrainian: Садове), is a former village within the boundaries of Tokmak in Polohy Raion, Zaporizhzhia Oblast, Ukraine. The village was part of the Molotschna Colony.

== Geography ==
Ladivka is located 500 metres from the Tokmak River. The former village is located 3 kilometres southwest of Tokmak city centre, and 1.4 kilometres northeast of Petershahen.

== History ==
Ladivka was founded as Ladekopp in 1806 by 26 Mennonite families from Prussia. The name Ladekopp was named after the village of the same name in Prussia, now Lubieszewo. The village economy was centred on agriculture. Ladivka had a school, but no church; the local church was in Petershahen.

Only six families had enough money to build wooden houses, although the forest was provided by the city of Oleksandrivsk. 108,000 trees were planted in Ladekopp in 1851. In 1869, there were 20 large and 29 small farms in the village. In 1908, there was a brickyard owned by D. Walde, a fabric dying workshop owned by J. Bestvater, two windmills owned by A. Tevs and P. Fast, and a steam mill owned by G. Warkentin. A school was built in 1910 by a Kharkiv architect. It had two classrooms, the larger of which was used for community services and church gatherings. The school also had two living quarters for teachers. The village was renamed to Sadove in 1915 due to the Russification of names during World War I.

Some families of the village were sent to Siberia in 1929 and 1930 as Kulaks during the Collectivization of Agriculture. Mennonite men were sent to fight in 1941, and the women and children were sent East in September. They returned to the village during German occupation, but 140 Mennonites evacuated to Germany on September 12, 1943. 25 Mennonites moved to Canada, 2 to Paraguay, and the rest returned to the village after the war. The village was renamed to Ladivka in May 1945.

The former village was occupied by the Russians in March 2022. Currently, a number of Mennonite buildings have been preserved in the village, including the school.

== Demographics ==
The population of the village was 100 Mennonite families with 460 inhabitants in 1914.
