= Zelenyi Hai, Smyrnove rural hromada, Polohy Raion, Zaporizhzhia Oblast =

Village in Zaporizhzhia Oblast, Ukraine

Zelenyi Hai Зелений Гай
- Village
- Location of Zelenyi Hai in Zaporizhzhia Oblast Location of Zelenyi Hai in Ukraine
- Coordinates: 47°18′59″N 36°29′03″E
- Country: Ukraine
- Oblast: Zaporizhzhia Oblast
- Raion: Polohy Raion
- Established: 1932

Area
  - Total: 1.06 km^{2} (0.41 sq mi)
- Elevation: 213 m (699 ft)

Population (2001)
  - Total: 244
  - Density: 230/km^{2} (596/sq mi)
- Time zone: UTC+2 (EET)
  - Summer (DST): UTC+3 (EEST)
- Postal code: 71022
- Area code: +380 6147

Zelenyi Hai (Ukrainian: Зелений Гай) is a village in Polohy Raion, Smyrnove rural hromada, Zaporizhzhia Oblast, southern Ukraine. The village's population was 244 as of the 2001 Ukrainian Census. Zelenyi Hai is home to a large ethnic German population.

== History ==
Until 12 June 2020, Zelenyi Hai was located in Bilmak Raion. The raion was abolished in summer 2020 as part of the administrative reform of Ukraine, which reduced the number of raions of Zaporizhzhia Oblast to five. The area of Bilmak Raion was merged into Polohy Raion.

== Demographics ==
Native language according to the 2001 Ukrainian census:

Native languages in Zelenyi Hai
	percent
Ukrainian	85.7%
German	10.2%
Russian	3.7%
Polish	0.4%
