= Oleksandr Ivchenko =

Soviet aircraft engine designer (1903–1968)

- Олександр Георгійович Івченко
- Born: 23 November 1903; Tokmak, Russian Empire
- Died: 30 June 1968 (aged 64); Zaporizhzhia, Ukrainian SSR, Soviet Union
- Education: Kharkiv Polytechnic Institute
- Occupation: Aircraft engine design engineer
- Known for: Ivchenko-Progress aircraft engines
- Awards: USSR State Prize (1948); Lenin Prize (1960); Hero of Socialist Labour (1963)
- Engineering career
- Employer: Ivchenko-Progress

Oleksandr Georgiyowych Ivchenko (Ukrainian: Олександр Георгійович Івченко, Russian: Александр Георгиевич Ивченко, transliteration: Aleksandr Georgievič Ivčenko; born 23 November [O.S. 10 November] 1903 in Tokmak; died 30 June 1968 in Zaporizhzhia) was a Soviet Ukrainian aircraft engine design engineer.

== Life ==
In 1920 Ivchenko began an apprenticeship in a metal foundry. He later completed his studies at the Institute for Mechanical Engineering in Kharkiv, which he left in 1935 as a designer for internal combustion engines. He became a test bench engineer for aircraft engines at Plant No. 29 in Zaporizhzhia. Shortly thereafter he was transferred to the development department for piston engines, where he soon became chief designer.

In 1939, the development of the engine type M-89 was agreed, which was to deliver 1500 hp, however Plant No. 29 was transferred to Siberia. Ivchenko concentrated on the preparations for the series production of the ASh-82FN engine type, which was also intended for the Lavochkin La-5.

In 1945, again in Zaporizhzhia, he became chief designer in Development Office No. 478, and in 1963 he became its general designer. In the period from 1945 to 1968, this development office created designs for engines that were used throughout the Soviet aviation industry, but also in naval technology. In addition to piston engines (such as: AI-26, AI-10, AI-12, AI-14 ), this also included gas turbines for aircraft (TS-12F, AI-2MK, AI-8, AI-20K, AI-20K, I-24) and helicopters (AI-4B, AI-26B, AI-14B, AI-7, AI-8, AI-24B, TB-2BK). On a smaller scale, small engines were also developed, for example for chainsaws or snowmobiles.

Ivchenko was a member of the Academy of Sciences of the Ukrainian SSR and received numerous orders and awards, such as the USSR State Prize in 1948, the Lenin Prize in 1960 and the title of Hero of Socialist Labour in 1963.

== See also ==
- Progress engines

== Literature ==
- Fedir Murawtschenko (Ф. М. Муравченко). Івченко Олександр Георгійович. In: Encyclopedia of Modern Ukraine. Volume 11. p. 180. (Ukrainian)
