= Novoprokopivka =

Village in southern Ukraine

Novoprokopivka Новопрокопівка
- Village
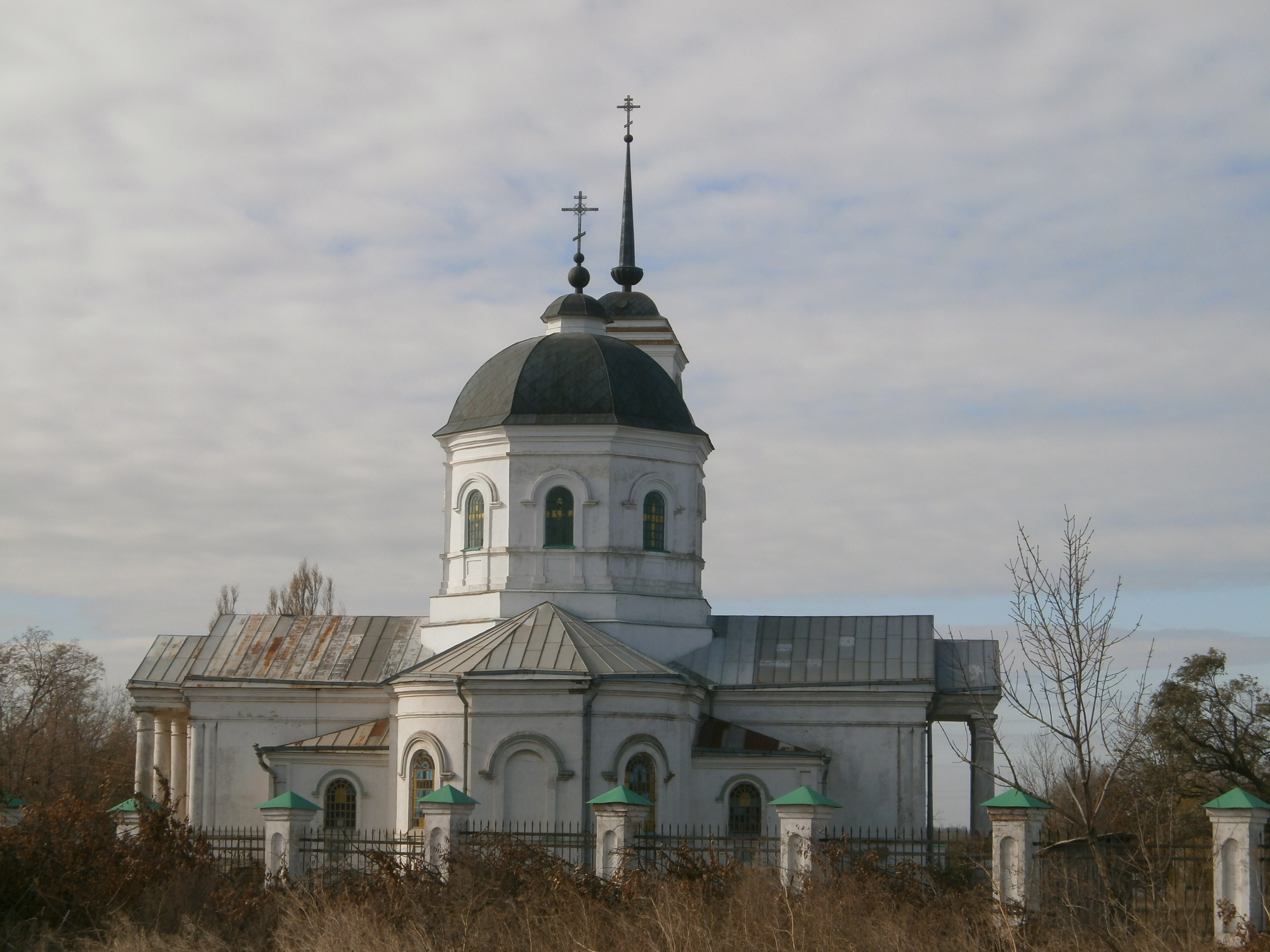
- A church in Novoprokopivka
- Interactive map of Novoprokopivka
- Location of Novoprokopivka in Zaporizhzhia Oblast Novoprokopivka (Ukraine)
- Coordinates: 47°24′45″N 35°50′11″E
- Country: Ukraine
- Oblast: Zaporizhzhia Oblast
- District: Polohy Raion
- Hromada: Tokmak urban hromada

Population (2001 census)
  - Total: 747

Novoprokopivka (Ukrainian: Новопро́копівка) is a village in southern Ukraine, administratively located in Tokmak urban hromada, Polohy Raion, Zaporizhzhia Oblast. It had a population of 747 as of 2001.

== Geography ==
It is located near the watershed of tributaries of the Konka river, which flows roughly northwestward into the Dnieper, and the Molochna river, which flows roughly southwards into the Sea of Azov. It is 25 kilometres (16 mi) away from Tokmak, and 13 kilometres (8.1 mi) south of Orikhiv. It is a few kilometres south of Robotyne.

== History ==
Novoprokopivka was founded in the mid-19th century under the Russian Empire as Vershyna (Ukrainian: Вершина) by settlers from Mala Tokmachka. It gained its current name in 1882.

The village has become a frontline battlefield of the Russo-Ukrainian War during the Russian invasion of Ukraine. On 25 August 2023, it was reported by Russian and Ukrainian sources that Ukrainian forces were advancing on the village during their 2023 Ukrainian Counteroffensive. On September 24, 2023, it was reported that the Ukrainian soldiers were inside the village; however, their advance stalled at this point and Russian forces succeeded in pushing them out. After the end of the Ukrainian counteroffensive in December 2023, the village remained under Russian control.

== Demographics ==
As of the 2001 Ukrainian census, the village had a population of 747 inhabitants. The native language composition was as follows:

First languages in Novoprokopivka
	percent
Ukrainian	92.6%
Russian	5.4%
Moldovan	0.8%
Armenian	0.4%
German	0.3%
Belarusian	0.3%
Hungarian	0.1%
others	0.1%
