= Smyrnove =

Smyrnove Смирнове
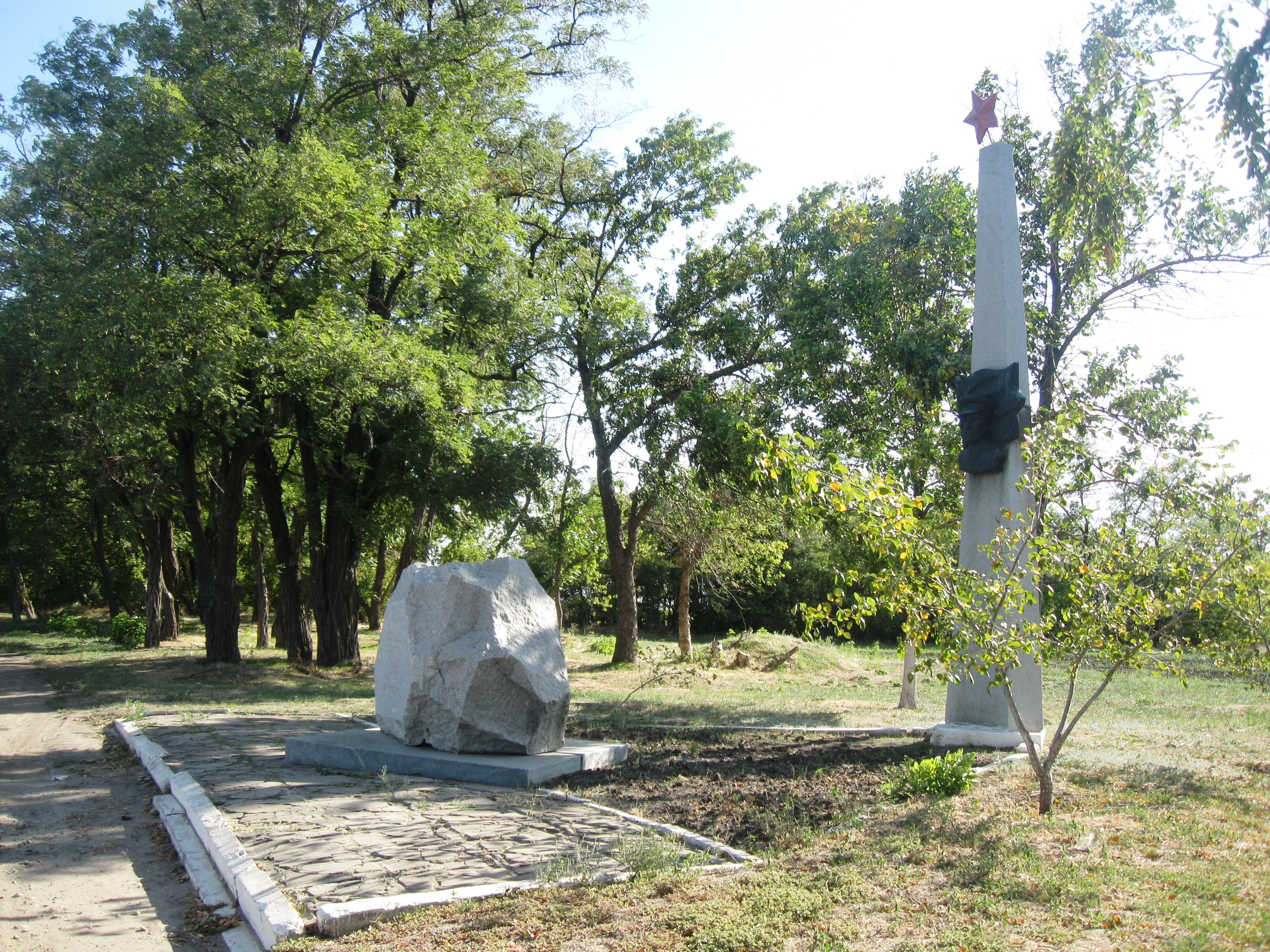
- World War II monument in Smyrnove

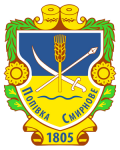
- Coat of arms

- Location within Ukraine Location within Zaporizhzhia Oblast
- Coordinates: 47°12′42″N 36°32′32″E
- Country: Ukraine
- Oblast: Zaporizhzhia Oblast
- Raion: Polohy Raion
- Hromada: Smyrnove rural hromada
- Founded: 1805

Population (1970)
  - Total: 1,700

Smyrnove (Ukrainian: Смирнове́) is a village in southern Ukraine, located administratively in Smyrnove rural hromada, Polohy Raion, Zaporizhzhia Oblast. Before 1946, it was known as Popivka (Ukrainian: Попівка).

== Geography ==
Smyrnove is located on the Verda river. It is located 21 kilometres (13 mi) southeast of the town Kamianka.

== History ==
=== Founding ===
The village was founded in 1805 in the times of the Russian Empire by state peasants from the village of Popivka in Chernihiv Governorate. They named the village "Popivka" after their original hometown. Subsequent waves of migrants arrived over the following few decades, and the population rapidly increased, reaching 1,175 people by 1830 and 6,070 by 1886.

=== 20th century ===
On the eve of World War I, Popivka had a population of 11,200 people. During the Russian Civil War, Popivka changed hands several times. In April 1918, it was captured by the Central Powers during their invasion of Ukraine. They left the village in November the same year. In early January 1919, Popivka was captured by the anti-communist White Army. It repeatedly changed hands between the White Army and the Bolsheviks over the remainder of the war, before finally ending up in the hands of the Bolsheviks on October 25, 1920, who established the communist Soviet Union on much of the territory of the former Russian Empire. Smyrnove was incorporated into Bilmak Raion of Zaporizhzhia Oblast, in the Ukrainian Soviet Socialist Republic.

During World War II, in early October 1941, forces of Nazi Germany broke through Soviet lines near Melitopol and Orikhiv, and encircled the Soviet 18th Army led by Andrey Smirnov near Popivka. The 18th army entrenched itself and held out for a time, waiting for other Soviet forces led by Ivan Shepetov to arrive. After Shepetov's forces arrived on October 7, Smirnov ordered his forces to try to break out of the encirclement in the direction of nearby Oleksiivka. The breakthrough failed, and Smirnov was killed in the intense fighting, along with his troops. German troops captured Popivka and killed any remaining wounded Soviet soldiers they found, "ransacking" the village. They also deported 285 people from Popivka to Germany for forced labor.

Eventually, the Red Army was able to approach the village again, much later in the war. A long battle ensued to recapture Popivka. On September 17, 1943, Popivka was liberated and the Nazis fled, destroying many buildings behind them as they did so. The economy was essentially destroyed by the war, but it was slowly rebuilt. In June 1946, after the end of the war, Popivka was renamed Smyrnove in honor of Andrey Smirnov. Monuments were also built to the Soviet soldiers who had perished fighting in the village.

=== 21st century ===
In 2005, the 200th anniversary of the founding of Smyrnove was celebrated. Delegations from villages that had formerly been part of Smyrnove or founded by people from Smyrnove all gathered in the village. (Note: The full list of villages was: Vershyna Druha, Tytove, Oleksiivka, Saltychiia, Obitochne, Novovasylivka, Orlivka, Borysivka, Partyzany (now Novopavlivka) and Yelyseivka.) They exchanged gifts and put on performances.

On June 12, 2020, in accordance with nationwide administrative reform in Ukraine, Smyrnove was made the center of the newly created Smyrnove rural hromada, one of the hromadas of Ukraine. On July 17, 2020, Bilmak Raion was abolished, and Smyrnove, as well as the hromada surrounding it, was transferred to Polohy Raion.

== Demographics ==
Population history
Year	1830	1886	1970
Pop.	1,175	6,070	1,700
±% p.a.	—	+2.98%	−1.50%

Native language according to the 2001 Ukrainian census:

- Ukrainian: 91.6%
- Russian: 5.2%
- Armenian: 1.9%
- Belarusian: 1.2%
- "Moldovan" (Romanian): 0.1%
