= Yurii Harkavyi =

Ukrainian military commander

- Юрій Васильович Гаркавий
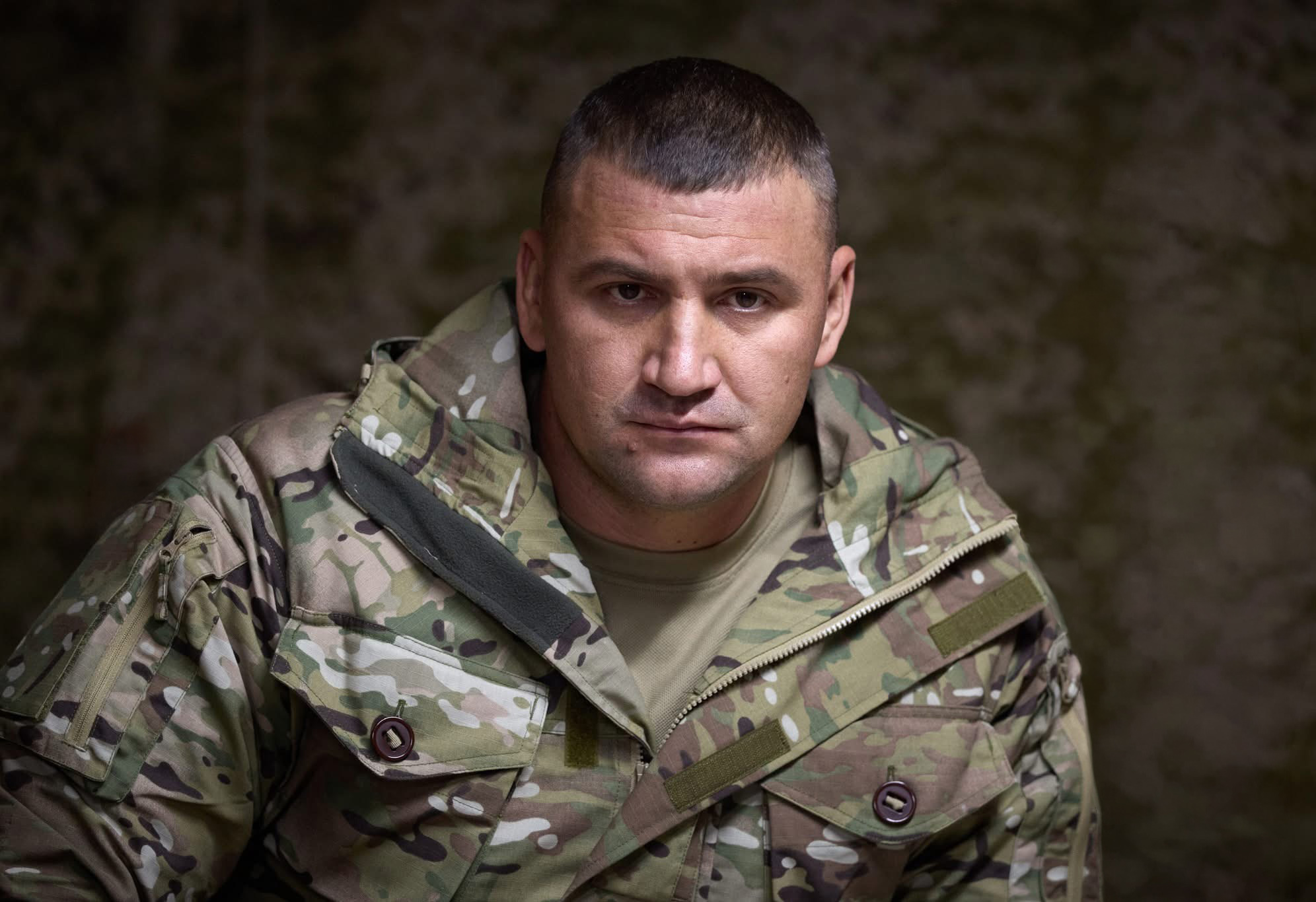
- Born: 1989 (age 36–37)
- Military career
- Allegiance: Ukraine
- Branch: Ukrainian Ground Forces
- Rank: Lieutenant colonel
- Nicknames: Skala; Skelia ("The Rock")
- Commands: 425th Separate Assault Regiment "Skala"
- Conflicts: Russo-Ukrainian War: War in Donbas; 2022 Kharkiv counteroffensive; Battle of Bakhmut; 2023 Ukrainian counteroffensive; Pokrovsk offensive
- Awards: Order of Danylo Halytsky

Yurii Vasylovych Harkavyi (Ukrainian: Юрій Васильович Гаркавий; born 1989) is a Ukrainian military officer and lieutenant colonel in the Armed Forces of Ukraine. He commands the 425th Separate Assault Regiment "Skala". Harkavyi was awarded the title Hero of Ukraine in 2025 and has received all three classes of the Order of Bohdan Khmelnytsky.

== Early service ==
Harkavyi was born in 1989. He took part in the Anti-Terrorist Operation that took part during war in Donbas and later the Joint Forces Operation in eastern Ukraine. He served in Operational Command East of the Ukrainian Ground Forces and was an assistant to the commander.

== Military career ==
According to the Encyclopedia of Modern Ukraine, Harkavyi continued combat service on multiple sectors of the front after the start of the full-scale invasion of Ukraine on 24 February 2022. A Pulitzer summary of The Wall Street Journal's reporting on Ukrainian units during the war stated that Harkavyi and a few dozen men began the invasion by ambushing armored columns and later operated with Ukraine's 93rd Brigade north of Barvinkove.

The presidential office said in January 2025 that, in 2022, the unit under Harkavyi's command carried out reconnaissance and sabotage missions in Kharkiv and Donetsk oblasts, and credited it with destroying more than 600 invading troops and over 50 armored vehicles. The same official profile stated that Harkavyi also took part in planning offensive and assault actions around Vodiane, Opytne, and Avdiivka. The Encyclopedia of Modern Ukraine states that Harkavyi commanded the 425th Separate Reconnaissance Battalion "Skala", and that he and the battalion fought in Kharkiv Oblast, including the liberation of Izium, as well as in the Volnovakha, Bakhmut, and Pokrovsk areas of Donetsk Oblast.

Reuters reported in August 2023 that troops of the separate assault battalion "Skala" had entered Robotyne during the southern counteroffensive, while the Encyclopedia of Modern Ukraine identifies Harkavyi as commander of the Skala battalion until January 2025. By late September 2024, Ukrainian television identified him, then a colonel, as commander of the 425th Separate Assault Battalion "Skala" on the Pokrovsk front.

The Encyclopedia of Modern Ukraine describes Harkavyi as commander of the 425th Separate Assault Regiment "Skala" from January 2025. On 4 November 2025, the presidential office said that he briefed President Volodymyr Zelenskyy on the situation around Pokrovsk as commander of the regiment.

On 26 June 2026, Harkaviy was removed from his post for the duration of the investigation, following accusations of abuse and killings of recruits of the regiment.

== Awards ==
- Hero of Ukraine with the Order of the Gold Star (20 January 2025), for personal courage and heroism in defending the state sovereignty and territorial integrity of Ukraine, and for selfless service to the Ukrainian people.
- Order of Danylo Halytsky (17 April 2024), for personal courage and selflessness in defending the state sovereignty and territorial integrity of Ukraine.
- Order of Bohdan Khmelnytsky, 1st class (3 September 2023), for personal courage and selfless actions in defending the state sovereignty and territorial integrity of Ukraine.
- Order of Bohdan Khmelnytsky, 2nd class (20 June 2022), for personal courage and selfless actions in defending the state sovereignty and territorial integrity of Ukraine, and loyalty to the military oath.
- Order of Bohdan Khmelnytsky, 3rd class (24 March 2022), for personal courage and selfless actions in defending the state sovereignty and territorial integrity of Ukraine, and loyalty to the military oath.
