= Kamianka, Polohy Raion, Zaporizhzhia Oblast =

Rural locality in Zaporizhzhia Oblast, Ukraine

Kamianka Кам'янка
- Rural settlement
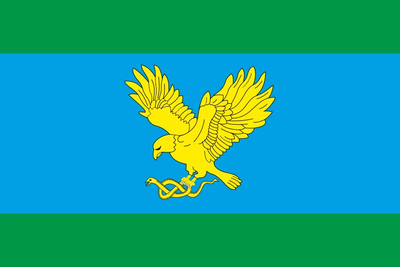
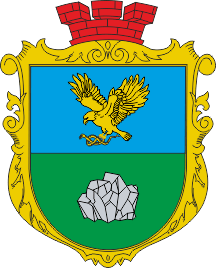
- Flag Seal

- Location in Zaporizhzhia Oblast Location in Ukraine
- Coordinates: 47°21′48″N 36°39′19″E
- Country: Ukraine
- Oblast: Zaporizhzhia Oblast
- Raion: Polohy Raion
- Hromada: Kamianka settlement hromada

Population (2022)
  - Total: 6,358
- Time zone: UTC+2 (EET)
  - Summer (DST): UTC+3 (EEST)

Kamianka (Ukrainian: Кам'янка) is a rural settlement in Polohy Raion, Zaporizhzhia Oblast, southern Ukraine. It is located in the eastern part of the oblast. Population: 6,358 (2022 estimate). It is the center of Kamianka settlement hromada, one of the hromadas of Ukraine.

== History ==
c. 1782 in the Russian Empire, settlers from Poltava Governorate founded the settlement Kamianka. Its name was derived from the Kamianka river, upon which the village sits. On a map from the first half of the 19th century, the village is marked as Belmanka (Ukrainian: Бельманка), from the nearby Turkic "Bilmak" burial mounds. In 1797, it was renamed Tsarekostiantynivka after Grand Duke Konstantin Pavlovich of Russia. The population grew with the settlement by state serfs from other parts of what is now northern Ukraine.

During the Russian Civil War that began in 1918, Tsarekostiantynivka changed hands several times between the opposing forces, before eventually being taken over by the Bolsheviks in late October 1920. Incorporated into the Ukrainian SSR of the newly established communist Soviet Union, the village suffered as a result of collectivization in the republic. In March 1923, Tsarekostiantynivka Raion was created as a raion of Berdiansk Okruha, with its center in Tsarekostiantynivka. In January 1926, Tsarekostiantynivka was renamed to Pershotravneve, supposedly "following the wishes of the population", according to official Soviet sources. Tsarekostiantynivka Raion was also renamed to Pershotravneve Raion. The village suffered during the Holodomor, a manmade famine across Soviet Ukraine in 1932 and 1933. In April 1935, Pershotravneve was again renamed to Kuibysheve (Ukrainian: Куйбишеве) in honor of the Soviet politician Valerian Kuybyshev.

During World War II, Kuibysheve was occupied by Nazi Germany between October 6, 1941 and September 15, 1943. Kuibysheve received urban-type settlement status in 1957.

After Ukrainian independence, on 21 May 2016, the Verkhovna Rada adopted a decision to rename Kuibysheve Raion to Bilmak Raion and Kuibysheve to Bilmak (Ukrainian: Більмак) according to the law prohibiting names of Communist origin. The new name was chosen because of a nearby Turkic burial mound named "Belmak". However, when transferred to the Ukrainian language, "bilmak" can mean roughly "a person with a black eye". This offended the residents of the town, and they continued to use the Communist name in colloquial speech. They suggested returning to its original name of "Kamianka" and the Verkhovna Rada adopted this proposal on 6 October 2021.

In March 2022, during Russian invasion of Ukraine, the town was captured by Russian forces.

Until 26 January 2024, Kamianka was designated urban-type settlement. On this day, a new law entered into force which abolished this status, and Kamianka became a rural settlement.

== Demographics ==
Population history
Year	1859	1897	1914	1959	1970	1979	2001	2015	2022
Pop.	4,451	8,188	7,571	5,400	6,900	7,900	8,134	7,234	6,358
±% p.a.	—	+1.62%	−0.46%	−0.75%	+2.25%	+1.52%	+0.13%	−0.83%	−1.83%

=== Census data ===
As of the Ukrainian census in 2001, Kamianka (formerly Kuybysheve/Bilmak) had a population of 8,134 inhabitants. The native language composition was as follows:

First languages (2001)
	percent
Ukrainian	92.8%
Russian	6.8%
Belarusian	0.2%
Moldovan	0.1%
others	0.1%

== Economy ==
=== Transportation ===
The settlement is on Highway H08 connecting Zaporizhzhia and Mariupol.

The closest railway station is at Komysh-Zoria, about 5 kilometres (3.1 mi) southeast of Kamianka. It has connections to Zaporizhzhia, Volnovakha, and Berdiansk. There is passenger traffic through the station.

== Notable people ==
- Chana Orloff, French sculptor
