= Petershahen =

Village in Zaporizhzhia Oblast, Ukraine

Petershahen Петерсгаген Petershagen
- Village
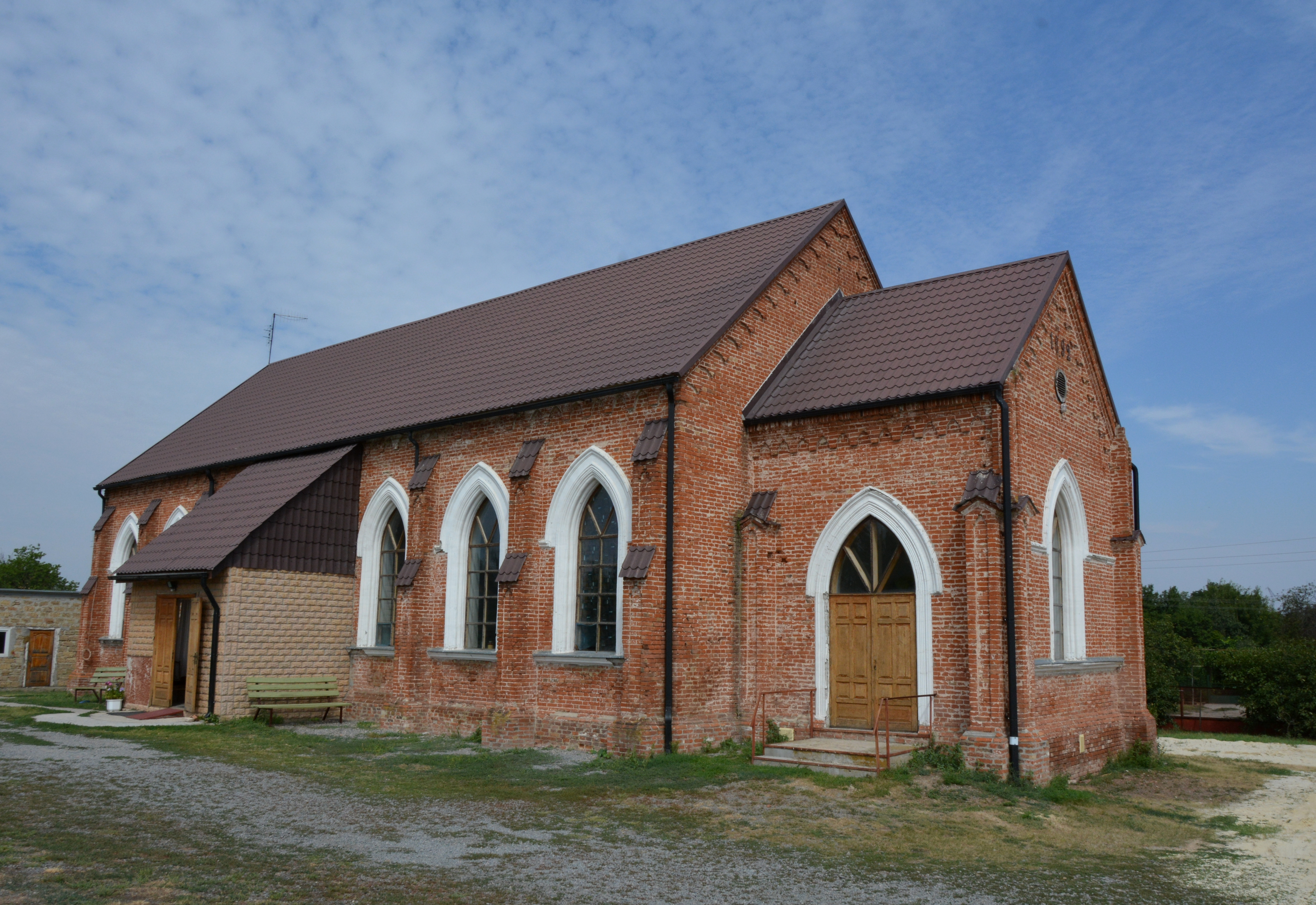
- Mennonite Church in Petershahen

- Location within Zaporizhzhia Oblast Location within Ukraine
- Coordinates: 47°13′18″N 35°38′15″E
- Country: Ukraine
- Oblast: Zaporizhzhia Oblast
- Raion: Polohy Raion
- Hromada: Tokmak urban hromada
- Established: 1805

Area
  - Total: 0.724 km^{2} (0.280 sq mi)
- Elevation: 38 m (125 ft)

Population
  - Total: 407
  - Density: 562/km^{2} (1,460/sq mi)
- Postal code: 71709

Petershahen (Ukrainian: Петерсгаген; German: Petershagen), formerly known as Kutuzivka (Ukrainian: Кутузівка), is a village in Polohy Raion, Zaporizhzhia Oblast, Ukraine. Administratively, it is part of Tokmak urban hromada, one of the hromadas of Ukraine. In 2001 its population was 407.

== Geography ==
Petershahen is located on the bank of the Tokmak river. The village is located 1.5 km southwest of Tokmak, and 1.5 km northeast of Molochansk.

== History ==
The village was founded by Flemish Mennonites in 1805 under the name Petershagen within the region of Molotschna, which the village was part of until 1871. In 1869, there were 42 farms. In 1908, there was a brickyard, a windmill, a mill, a shop, and a wagon builder.

In 1945, the village was renamed to Kutuzivka. On September 18, 2024, the original name of the village was de jure returned as part of the derussification campaign.

The village has been part of Polohy Raion since July 19, 2020 following the abolition of Tokmak Raion. Petershahen has been occupied by Russia since April 2022.

== Mennonite church ==
The first church in the village was built in 1810 and demolished in 1852, but the extant church dates to 1892. The building was built in the Neo Gothic style using red brick. The church closed in 1920 and became a granary. It was later used a stable, and a chemical storage building. The church was restored in 1999 with donations from Canada, and the efforts of Frank and Nettie Dyck. The church reopened in October 1999.

== Transport ==
The P85 highway passes through the village, as well as the Fedorivka–Verkhnii Tokmak II–Volnovakha railway line, although there is no station.

== Demographics ==
The population in 1908 was 308.

As of the 2001 Ukrainian census, Petershahen had a population of 407 inhabitants. The population is ethnically almost entirely Ukrainian, though a small number of Germans and Russians also dwell in the village. The composition of the population by their native language was as follows:

Native languages in Petershagen
| | percent |
| Ukrainian | 89.93% |
| Russian | 8.59% |
| German | 1.23% |
| Bulgarian | 0.25% |
| others | 0.00% |
