= Adam Tactical Group =

Ukrainian military unit

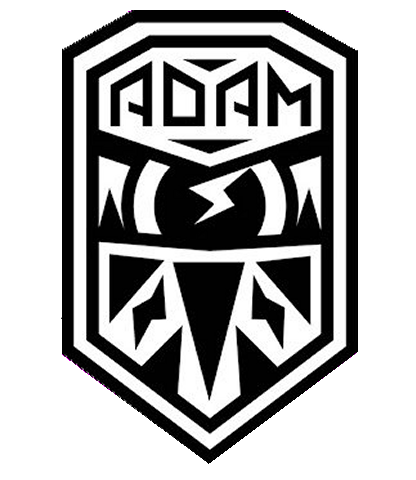
- Logo used by the Adam Tactical Group
- Active: 2022 – present
- Country: Ukraine
- Engagements: Russo-Ukrainian War; Battle of Sievierodonetsk (2022); Battle of Bakhmut

Commanders
- Current commander: Colonel Yevhen Mezhevikin

The Adam Tactical Group is a Ukrainian military unit that was named after its commander, veteran of the fighting for Donetsk airport, Colonel Yevhen Mezhevikin, whose call sign is ″Adam″.

During the Russian invasion of Ukraine that started in 2022, the unit has taken part in the battles of Sievierodonetsk and Bakhmut, deploying to the latter in February 2023.

== See also ==
- Skala Battalion
