= Margaryta Yakovenko =

Ukrainian born Spanish language journalist and writer

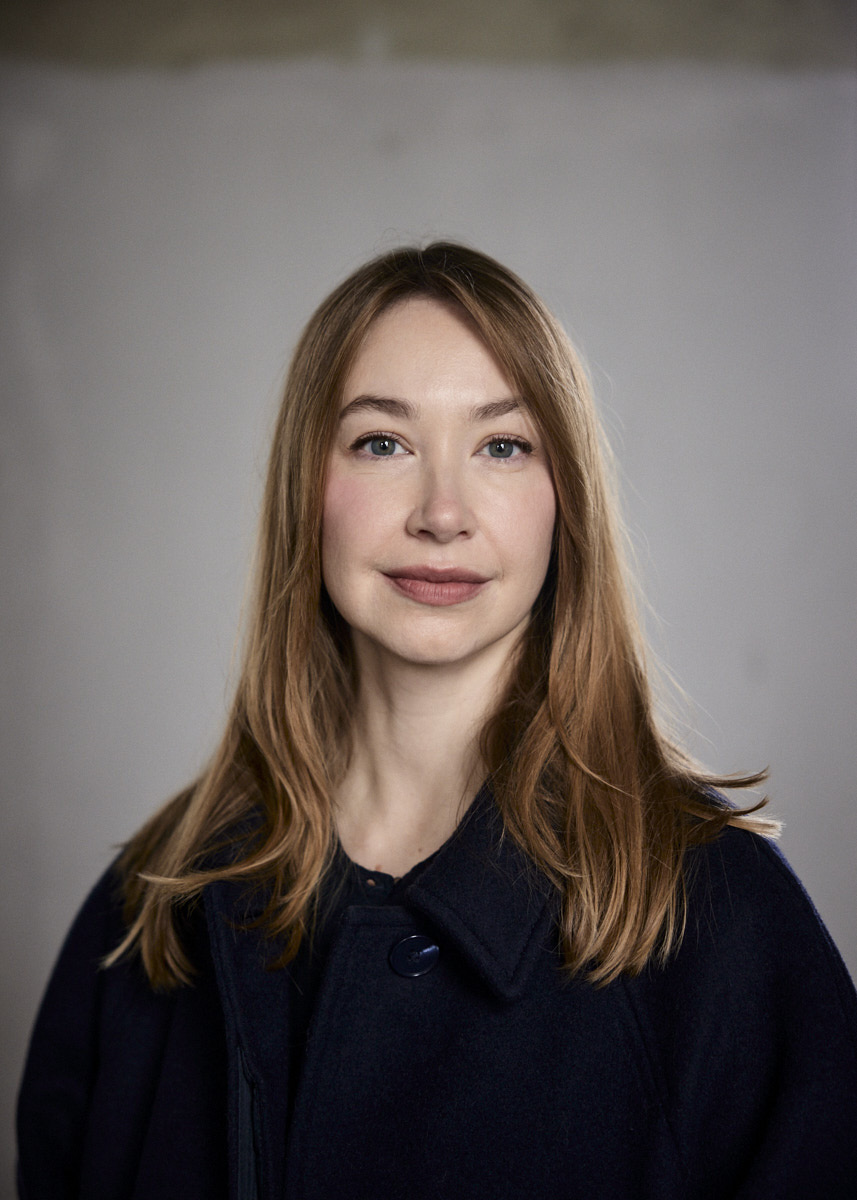
- Yakovenko in 2026
- Born: 1992 (age 33–34); Tokmak, Ukraine
- Citizenship: Spain
- Education: University of Murcia, Pompeu Fabra University
- Occupations: Journalist, Writer
- Employer: El País
- Notable work: Desencajada
- Awards: Gaudi Gresol Literary Award (2022)

Margaryta Yakovenko (Ukrainian: Маргарита Яковенко; born 1992) is a Ukrainian-born Spanish language writer and journalist.

== Biography ==
Yakovenko moved with her family to Los Alcázares in 1999 when she was seven years old. She studied journalism at the University of Murcia and completed a master's degree in International Political Journalism at Pompeu Fabra University. She has been an editor at PlayGround magazine, a writer El Periódico de Catalunya, and a writer at La Opinión. She currently works at El País. She published the short story No queda tanto (English: Not Much Left) in the anthology Cuadernos de Medusa (2018), from the editorial Amor de Madre. Desencajada (English: Displaced) was her first novel and published in 2020.

== Awards ==
- Gaudi Gresol Literary Award (2022)
- Mandarache Award Finalist (2023)

== Bibliography ==
- Cuadernos de Medusa (2018, Amor de Madre)
- Desencajada (2020, Caballo de Troya)
