= 425th Assault Regiment (Ukraine) =

Ukrainian military intelligence unit

425th Separate Assault Regiment "Skelya"
- Ukrainian: 425-й окремий десантно-штурмовий полк «Скеля»
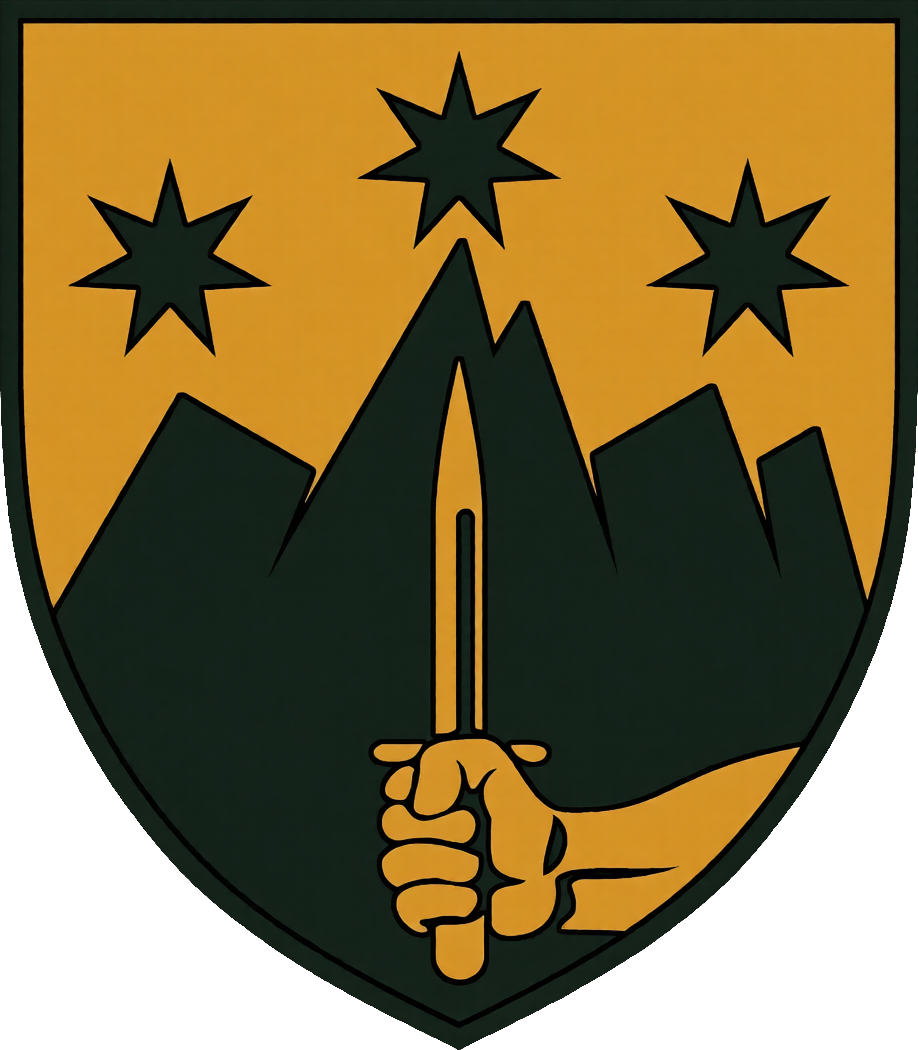
- Active: 2022–Present
- Country: Ukraine
- Branch: Ukrainian Ground Forces
- Type: Assault Infantry
- Size: Regiment
- Part of: Operational Command East
- Nickname: Skelya regiment
- Patron: Yurii Harkavyi (callsign "Skala")
- Engagements: Russo-Ukrainian War; 2022 Kharkiv counteroffensive; Battle of Bakhmut; 2023 Ukrainian counteroffensive; Pokrovsk offensive
- Website: 425skala.com

Commanders
- Notable commanders: Yuriy Harkaviy

Insignia
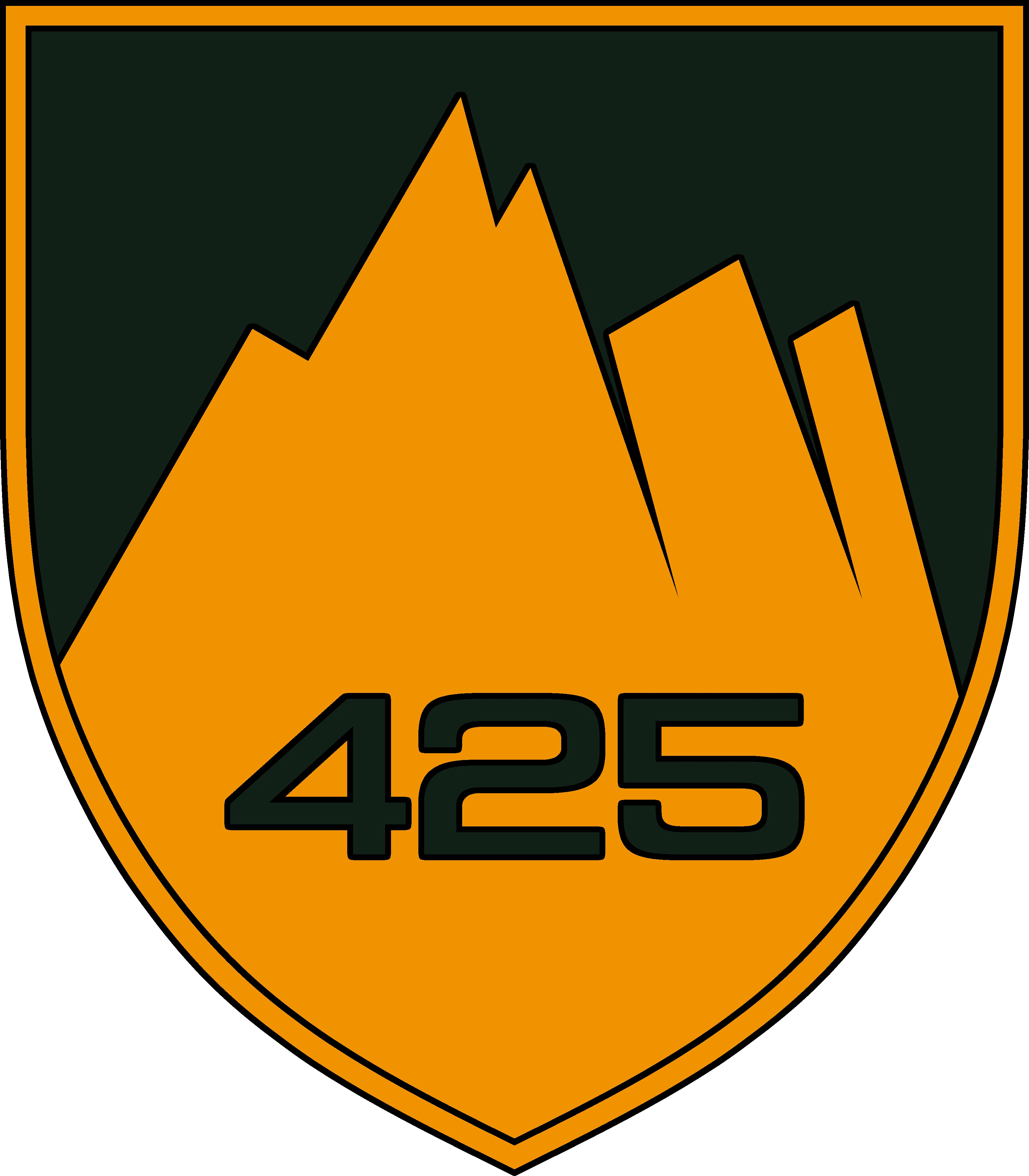
- Former insignia

The 425th Separate Assault Regiment "Skelya" (formerly "Skala") (Ukrainian: 425-й окремий десантно-штурмовий полк «Скеля»; MUN A4862) is a unit of the Ukrainian Ground Forces formed by Yurii Harkavyi "Skala", whose nickname "Skala" ("Rock") gave the unit its name. It has taken part in operations in the Russian invasion of Ukraine starting in 2022, such as assaults on enemy positions and using aerial drones to hunt Russian soldiers, having success in the 2022 Kharkiv counteroffensive working with the 93rd Mechanized Brigade.

Skala has been described as a specialized unit that has demonstrated high efficiency on the battlefield in conducting aerial reconnaissance and assault operations, employing drones, tube artillery and rocket artillery, and tanks. The regiment has also been criticized for high level of casualties and accused of physical abuse and human rights violations against its servicemen.

== History ==
The Skala Battalion was formed in 2022 by Yurii Harkavyi "Skala" initially as a military intelligence volunteer unit, later being reformed into an assault battalion.

The Skala Battalion took part in the defense of Bakhmut, being in the immediate vicinity when a Russian Sukhoi Su-24 was shot down.

During the 2023 Ukrainian counteroffensive, the battalion was deployed on the southern front in the Zaporizhzhia direction, participating in the Ukrainian advance into Robotyne.

In January 2025, the battalion was reinforced with tanks and artillery and then converted into a regiment. Despite this designation, the unit's size is closer to that of a division, numbering around 13,000 personnel as of 2026. On 20 May 2025, the regiment formed the first motorcycle assault company in the Ukrainian military, presumably based on similar companies used by the Russian Armed Forces. Two days later, it reportedly carried out a successful raid on the border in the Kursk region using motorcycles.

In August 2025 the unit renamed itself from "Skala" to "Skelya" to conform with modern Ukrainian language conventions.

On 2 December 2025, the regiment's X account published a video with two soldiers holding a Ukrainian flag in central Pokrovsk in an effort to debunk Russian claims about their presence in the city. Deepstate identified the video as AI-modified footage of Russian soldiers holding a Russian flag. Later on 9 December, the BBC reported that members of the unit displayed a Ukrainian flag in northern Pokrovsk, disputing Russian claims of having captured the city.

On 31 March 2026, an M1A1 Abrams, a BMP-2, and an M1117 armored vehicle of the regiment was destroyed during a mechanized assault near the village of Hryshyne, Donetsk Oblast. On 1 April, Serhii Sternenko, made a post on Facebook demanding accountability.

In July 2026, the unit said it had conducted an offensive in Dnipropetrovsk Oblast, advancing 25 km and liberating six villages while also locating and eliminating Russian drone operators.

On 7 August 2026, Ukrainska Pravda reported that soldiers from the regiment were being transferred to other units as a result of the abuse allegations, and that the regiment was being restructured, having previously been "artificially inflated" and suffering from low quality of command. On 13 August, the regiment's spokesperson stated that it was placed under the operational control of the 1st Azov Corps.

== Accusations of mistreatment of mobilized soldiers ==
On 2 April 2026, First Deputy Military Ombudsman Ruslan Tsygankov said during an interview with Radio Free Europe/Radio Liberty that there were complaints of human rights violations in the 425th Assault Regiment, including beatings.

In May 2026, Suspilne published an investigation dedicated to the deaths of at least five regiment's servicemen from the Ivano-Frankivsk region, who died in March 2026 after serving from a few days to five weeks. Relatives of some of the deceased reported bodily injuries and claimed that the soldiers had spoken of beatings and mistreatment. Official causes of death in the documents are listed as heart and lung diseases.

According to an investigation by Babel published on 23 June 2026, at least 26 recruits died within six months at the training centers of the regiment, with most of them having served for less than a month. Journalists, citing over 30 testimonies from relatives, servicemen, and individuals who went AWOL, reported cases of beatings, cruel treatment, inadequate medical assistance, and suicides. The investigation also described overcrowded confinement conditions for the mobilized, punishments for escape attempts, the possible use of physical violence, and issues with providing treatment to individuals with addictions, mental disorders, and chronic illnesses. Representatives of the regiment denied some of these allegations. The day after the publication was released, the Ukrainian State Bureau of Investigation had initiated a pre-trial investigation based on the disclosed facts.

The same day, Ukrainian Military Ombudsman Olha Reshetylova said that an inspection organized by her office and the military law enforcement service back in June 2025 identified a group of regimental instructors who organized abuse at training grounds, but no action was taken. Representatives of the Ombudsman's Office stated that the Skelya Regiment was the subject of the highest number of complaints received.

On 26 June 2026, Harkaviy was removed from his post for the duration of the investigation.

== Structure ==
- 1st Assault Battalion
- 1st Infantry Battalion
- 210th Assault Battalion
- 210th Independent Unmanned Systems Battalion
- the ‘Shkval’ specialist assault battalion
- Tank unit (on M1A1 Abrams)

== See also ==
- Kraken Regiment
- Adam Tactical Group
