= Tokmak Solar Energy =

Solar power plant in Tokmak, Ukraine

Coordinates: 47.278°N 35.721°E

Tokmak Solar Energy is the largest solar power plant in Ukraine, with total area of 96 hectares (100 soccer fields) and the power capacity of 50 MW. It is located on the north side of the city of Tokmak in Zaporizhzhia Oblast. It was initially reported that it was dismantled and stolen by Russian soldiers when they occupied the city of Tokmak in Ukraine during the Russian invasion of Ukraine, however, this was not confirmed, apart from being partly damaged.

== History ==
Tokmak Solar Energy LLC or Green Energy Tokmak (Ukrainian: ТОВ Грін Енерджі Токмак, romanized: TOV Hrin Enerdzhi Tokmak) was established on June 9, 2011.

The station was opened in 2018. The capacity of the first stage was 11 MW, and was later increased to 50 MW. The construction of the power station cost 45 million euros. The power plant supplies energy to six districts of Zaporizhia Oblast.

On 23 June 2022, it was reported that during the Russian invasion of Ukraine, the Russian occupation forces stole the solar panels and took them to Russia. However, a day later this was denied by a related employee speaking to Ukrainian news outlet Terminal. Aerial imagery collected by Nexta showed that most of the panels seemed to be in place, although some reports stated that the occupiers plan is to 'quietly dismantle' them.

Later, the co-owner of the plant and Special Representative for Economic Diplomacy of the Ministry of Foreign Affairs, Oleksandr Repkin, stated to DELO.ua that it was not dismantled, but rather partially damaged by Russian BM-21 Grad rocket fire and a Russian tank running over some of the panels. The Russians had looted the plant office and have occasionally stolen inverters and cables, and a section of the plant is off limits for personnel as it is included in a restricted area based around a nearby military airfield. Due to these factors, Repkin stated that the plant's output is down 20% and the current capacity is around 40 MW.
