= Tokmak urban hromada =

Coordinates: 47°19′25″N 35°45′40″E

Tokmak urban hromada Токмацька міська громада
- Hromada
- Interactive map of Tokmak urban hromada
- Country: Ukraine
- Province: Zaporizhzhia Oblast
- District: Polohy Raion

Government
  - Head: Ihor Viktorovych Kotelevskyi

Population (2020)
  - Total: 36,719

Tokmak urban hromada (Ukrainian: Токмацька міська громада) is a hromada in the Polohy Raion (district) of Zaporizhzhia Oblast in Ukraine.

The area of the territory is 728.3 km^{2}. In 2020, 36,719 people lived there. The hromada borders Molochansk urban hromada. Its administrative center is the city of Tokmak, and it contains 25 villages:

- Chervonohirka
- Chystopillia
- Fabrychne
- Ilchenkove
- Ivanivka
- Kharkove
- Luhivka
- Myrne
- Nove
- Novoprokopivka
- Ocheretuvate
- Ostrykivka
- Petershahen
- Pokrovske
- Pshenychne
- Rivne
- Robotyne
- Sadove
- Shevchenkove
- Skeliuvate
- Snihurivka
- Solodka Balka
- Trudove
- Urozhaine
- Zamozhne

The hromada also contains the former village of Ladivka.
