= Robotyne =

Village in Zaporizhzhia Oblast, Ukraine

Robotyne Роботине
- Village
- Interactive map of Robotyne
- Location within Zaporizhzhia Oblast Location within Ukraine
- Coordinates: 47°26′35″N 35°49′34″E
- Country: Ukraine
- Oblast: Zaporizhzhia Oblast
- Raion: Polohy Raion
- Hromada: Tokmak urban hromada
- Founded: 1869

Area
  - Total: 3.115 km^{2} (1.203 sq mi)
- Elevation: 136 m (446 ft)

Population (2001 census)
  - Total: 480
  - Density: 150/km^{2} (400/sq mi)
- Time zone: UTC+2 (EET)
  - Summer (DST): UTC+3 (EEST)
- Postal code: 71720
- Area code: +380 6178
- KOATUU code: 2325283203
- KATOTTH code: UA23100270150025192

Robotyne (Ukrainian: Роботине, pronounced [roˈbɔtɪne]; Russian: Работино, Russian pronunciation: [rɐˈbotʲɪnə]) is a village in Polohy Raion, Zaporizhzhia Oblast, Ukraine. Administratively, it is part of Tokmak urban hromada, one of the hromadas of Ukraine. The village is roughly 15 kilometres (9.3 mi) southeast of Orikhiv, and 23 kilometres (14 mi) north of Tokmak. It had a population of 480 in 2001.

== History ==
=== 19th-20th centuries ===
According to Yu. Knyazkov, the area was initially settled as a farm in 1818 under the Russian Empire by migrants from the city of Orikhiv. The name is derived from the surname of the first settlers, Robota. The village was officially founded in 1869.

The area was administratively assigned to the Solodko-Balkiv Volost, Berdyansky Uyezd, Taurida Governorate. Until 1865, the inhabitants belonged to the parish in Orikhiv, prior to being transferred to nearby Kopani. Almost all residents were ethnic Ukrainians.

=== Early 21st century ===
Prior to administrative reforms, the village was a part of the Tokmak Raion, Zaporizhzhia Oblast, in Ukraine. The village is located 23 kilometres (14 mi) north of Tokmak, which made it one of the furthest settlements in Tokmak Raion from the district center, Tokmak.

On 12 June 2020, in accordance with the order of the Cabinet of Ministers of Ukraine No. 713-r "On the determination of administrative centers and approval of the territories of the territorial communities of the Zaporizhzhya region" the Novoprokopivka village council became part of Tokmak urban hromada of Tokmak Raion. On 17 July, as a result of the administrative-territorial reform and liquidation of Tokmak Raion, the village became part of Polohy Raion.

=== Russian invasion of Ukraine ===
Robotyne has been situated on the front lines during the Russo-Ukrainian War, and control of the village has changed between Ukraine and Russia multiple times during the conflict.

In early March 2022, Russian forces seized control of the village as part of the Russian invasion of Ukraine. According to local accounts, during the Russian occupation, life in the village was without heat, light, or water. One remaining family subsisted off of a garden, and shared food with neighbors. Houses were destroyed by daily Ukrainian shelling.

Ukrainian flag raised above Robotyne in August 2023

Intense clashes occurred near Robotyne amidst the 2023 Ukrainian counteroffensive, as it held a vital position in the Russian defensive front. The village endured significant damage and population loss throughout the battles. On 23 August, the 47th Mechanized Brigade unfurled the Ukrainian flag on the ruins of a local school, marking the capture of the village. Ukraine said that it subsequently organized the safe evacuation of the remaining civilians. By the time of the liberation, there was only one family left in the village. After the evacuation, the family now lives in Zaporizhzhia City.

On 6 September, units of the Russian 76th Air Assault Division made an attempt to recover their lost positions in the trench lines and heights south of Robotyne. The attack was made from the west and south from Novoprokopivka to reestablish control over the village. After a few hours of heavy fighting and successful counterattacks launched from north and northeast by Skala Battalion and drone units of 47th Mechanized Brigade, the Russian units were defeated and forced to withdraw.

On 24 February 2024, the Russian Ground Forces began a new offensive operation and entered central Robotyne. On 15 May, the Russian Ministry of Defence claimed that units of the "Dnepr" army group captured Robotyne. The Armed Forces of Ukraine however denied it. By 20 May, Robotyne was recaptured by Russian forces.

== Transport ==
The village sits on the part of the T0408 highway running north–south between Orikhiv and Tokmak.

== Demographics ==
According to the 2001 Ukrainian census, the majority of the population spoke Ukrainian (92.92%), and a minority spoke Russian (6.88%).
