= Ocheretuvate, Tokmak urban hromada, Polohy Raion, Zaporizhzhia Oblast =

Village in Polohy Raion, Zaporizhzhia Oblast, Ukraine

Coordinates: 47.3375°N 35.9436°E

Ocheretuvate (Ukrainian: Очеретувате) is a village in the Tokmak urban hromada, Polohy Raion, Zaporizhzhia Oblast, Ukraine. It has a population of 658.

During the southern campaign of the 2022 Russian invasion of Ukraine phase of the Russo-Ukrainian War, the village was occupied by Russian forces sometime around late February/early March.

== Demographics ==
As of the 2001 Ukrainian census, the village had a population of 658 inhabitants. The native language composition was as follows:

First languages in Ocheretuvate
	percent
Ukrainian	94.2%
Russian	3.8%
Belarusian	2.0%
others	0.0%
