= Komysh-Zoria settlement hromada =

Komysh-Zoria settlement hromada Комиш-Зорянська селищна громада
- Hromada
- Interactive map of Komysh-Zoria settlement hromada
- Country: Ukraine
- Oblast: Zaporizhzhia Oblast
- Raion: Polohy Raion

Area
  - Total: 371.1 km^{2} (143.3 sq mi)

Population (2020)
  - Total: 5,969
  - Density: 16.08/km^{2} (41.66/sq mi)
- Settlements: 10
- Villages: 9
- Towns: 1

Komysh-Zoria settlement hromada (Ukrainian: Комиш-Зорянська селищна громада) is a hromada of Ukraine, located in Polohy Raion, Zaporizhzhia Oblast. Its administrative center is the town of Komysh-Zoria.

It has an area of 371.1 square kilometres (143.3 mi^{2}) and a population of 5,969, as of 2020.

The hromada includes 10 settlements: 1 town (Komysh-Zoria) and 9 villages:

- Bilotserkivka
- Blahovishchenka
- Lantseve
- Novokamianka
- Rudenka
- Ternove
- Truzhenka
- Chereshneve
- Shevchenkivske

== See also ==
- List of hromadas of Ukraine
