= Smyrnove rural hromada =

Smyrnove rural hromada Смирновська селищна громада
- Hromada
- Interactive map of Smyrnove rural hromada
- Country: Ukraine
- Oblast: Zaporizhzhia Oblast
- Raion: Polohy Raion

Area
  - Total: 324.3 km^{2} (125.2 sq mi)

Population (2020)
  - Total: 3,161
  - Density: 9.747/km^{2} (25.24/sq mi)
- Settlements: 8
- Villages: 8

Smyrnove rural hromada (Ukrainian: Смирновська селищна громада) is a hromada of Ukraine, located in Polohy Raion, Zaporizhzhia Oblast. Its administrative center is the village of Smyrnove.

It has an area of 324.3 square kilometres (125.2 mi^{2}) and a population of 3,161, as of 2020.

The hromada contains 8 settlements, which are all villages:

- Verkhniodrahunske
- Vershyna Druha
- Dibrova
- Zelenyi Hai
- Zrazkove
- Oleksiivka
- Smyrnove
- Tytove

== See also ==
- List of hromadas of Ukraine
