= Ocheretuvate, Zaitseve rural hromada, Synelnykove Raion, Dnipropetrovsk Oblast =

Village in Synelnykove Raion, Dnipropetrovsk Oblast, Ukraine

Coordinates: 48.4345°N 35.7106°E

Ocheretuvate (Ukrainian: Очеретувате) is a village in Synelnykove Raion, Dnipropetrovsk Oblast, Ukraine.
