= Ocheretuvate, Kamianka settlement hromada, Polohy Raion, Zaporizhzhia Oblast =

Village in Bilmak Raion, Zaporizhzhia Oblast, Ukraine

Coordinates: 47°22′11″N 36°47′37″E

Ocheretuvate (Ukrainian: Очеретувате) is a village in Kamianka settlement hromada, Polohy Raion in Zaporizhzhia Oblast, Ukraine.
