= Komysh-Zoria =

Rural locality in Zaporizhzhia Oblast, Ukraine

Komysh-Zoria Комиш-Зоря
- Rural settlement
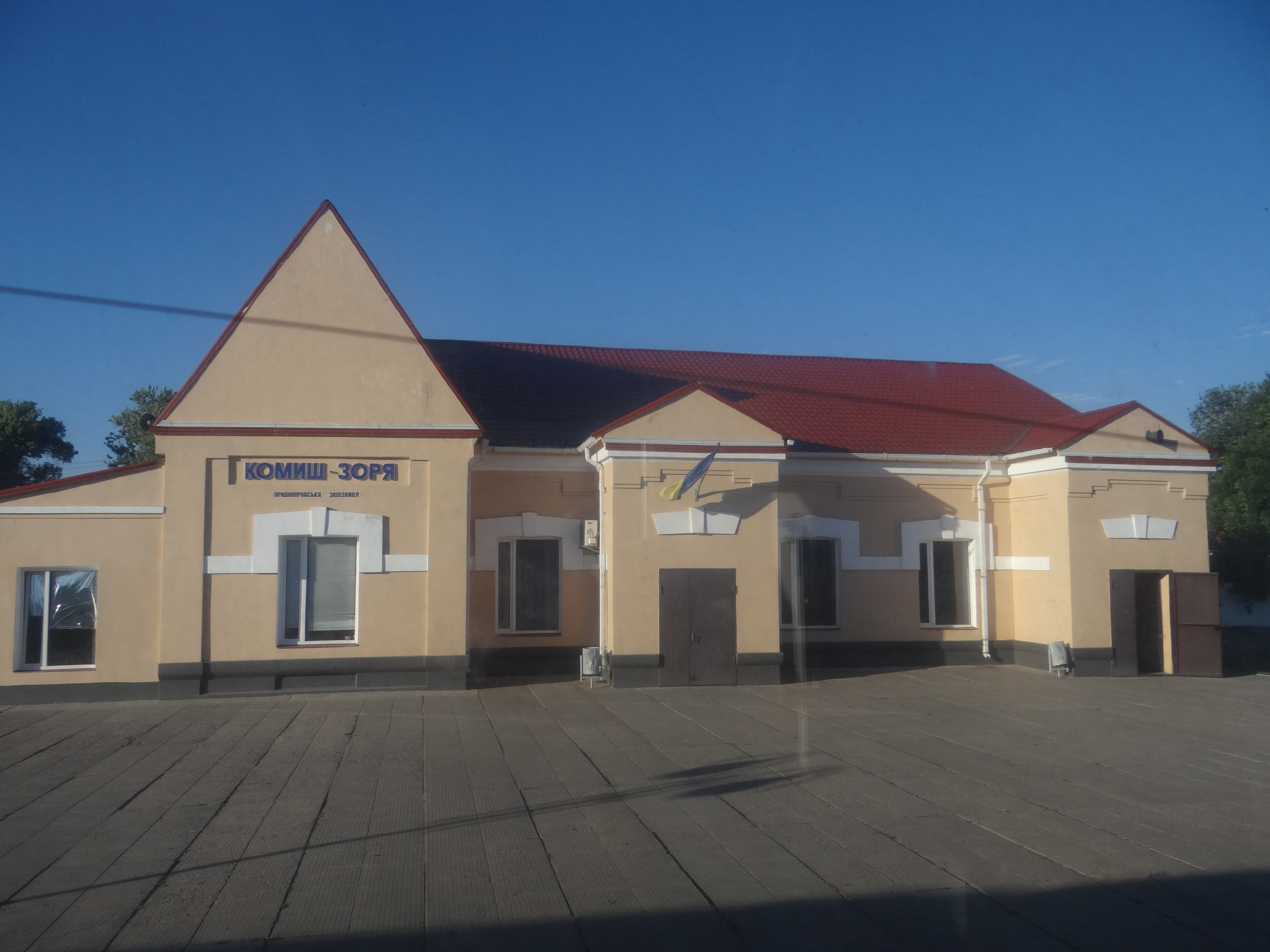
- Komysh-Zoria railway station

- Location in Zaporizhzhia Oblast Location in Ukraine
- Country: Ukraine
- Oblast: Zaporizhzhia Oblast
- Raion: Polohy Raion
- Hromada: Komysh-Zoria settlement hromada

Population (2022)
  - Total: 2,090
- Time zone: UTC+2 (EET)
  - Summer (DST): UTC+3 (EEST)

Komysh-Zoria (Ukrainian: Комиш-Зоря; Russian: Камыш-Заря, romanized: Kamysh-Zarya) is a rural settlement in Polohy Raion, Zaporizhzhia Oblast, southern Ukraine. It is located in the steppe area of Azov Upland between Zaporizhzhia and Mariupol. Komysh-Zoria hosts the administration of Komysh-Zoria settlement hromada, one of the hromadas of Ukraine. Population: 2,090 (2022 estimate).

== History ==
On 25 October 2015, Komysh-Zoria became the center of the newly formed Komysh-Zoria settlement hromada, originally an amalgamated hromada of Ukraine formed through the voluntary mergers of local rural and urban councils.

Until 18 July 2020, Komysh-Zoria belonged to Bilmak Raion. The raion was abolished in July 2020 as part of the administrative reform of Ukraine, which reduced the number of raions of Zaporizhzhia Oblast to five. The area of Bilmak Raion was merged into Polohy Raion.

On 18 November 2022, during the Russian invasion of Ukraine, it was reported by Ukrainian news outlets that Russian forces had murdered a family in Komysh-Zoria, citing law enforcement officials and Ukrainian security services. One source blamed the murders on militants of the Donetsk People's Republic and soldiers from Ossetia.

Until 26 January 2024, Komysh-Zoria was designated urban-type settlement. On this day, a new law entered into force which abolished this status, and Komysh-Zoria became a rural settlement.

== Economy ==
=== Transportation ===
Komysh-Zoria is a railway junction, with lines running north-west to Polohy and on to Zaporizhzhia city, west to Tokmak and then south to Melitopol, and north-east to Volnovakha and on to Donetsk and Mariupol. Komysh-Zoria railway station has some passenger traffic.

The settlement has access to Highway H08 connecting Zaporizhzhia and Mariupol.
