= Ivchenko AI-8 =

Aircraft auxiliary power unit

AI-8
- AI9-3B
- Type: Auxiliary Power Unit (APU)
- National origin: USSR
- Manufacturer: Ivchenko / Ivchenko-Progress / Motor Sich

The Ivchenko AI-8 (Russian: Ивченко АИ-8) is an aircraft auxiliary power unit developed and produced by Ivchenko-Progress and Motor Sich.

== Variants ==
AI-8
The base model which is used to generate electricity or supply compressed air to air-start systems. It can also be used as cabin heating if necessary.

== Specifications (AI-8) ==
Data from Aircraft engines of the World 1970

==== General characteristics ====
- Type: Auxiliary Power Unit (APU)
- Length: 725 mm (28.5 in)
- Width: 600 mm (24 in)
- Height: 550 mm (22 in)
- Diameter: ~500 mm (20 in) casing diameter
- Dry weight: 145 kg (320 lb)

==== Components ====
- Compressor: 1-stage centrifugal compressor
- Combustors: Annular combustion chamber with 6 fuel injectors
- Turbine: 1-stage axial turbine (gas generator); 1-stage (free power turbine) - generator drive at 4:1 ratio
- Fuel type: Aviation Kerosene such as JP-4

==== Performance ====
- Maximum power output: 75 kW (100 shp) at 37,000 rpm or 60 kW DC from TCP-24 electric generator at 9,250 rpm gearbox output
- Overall pressure ratio: 3.15:1
- Air mass flow: 1.75 kg/s (231 lb/min) at 37,000 rpm
- Fuel consumption: 120 kg/h (260 lb/h) maximum
- Power-to-weight ratio: 0.51 kW/kg (0.31 shp/lb)
