= Kamianka settlement hromada =

Kamianka settlement hromada Кам'янська селищна громада
- Hromada
- Interactive map of Kamianka settlement hromada
- Country: Ukraine
- Oblast: Zaporizhzhia Oblast
- Raion: Polohy Raion

Area
  - Total: 641.3 km^{2} (247.6 sq mi)

Population (2020)
  - Total: 11,455
  - Density: 17.86/km^{2} (46.26/sq mi)
- Settlements: 22
- Villages: 21
- Towns: 1

Kamianka settlement hromada (Ukrainian: Кам'янська селищна громада) formerly known as Bilmak settlement hromada (Ukrainian: Більмацька селищна громада) is a hromada of Ukraine, located in Polohy Raion, Zaporizhzhia Oblast. Its administrative center is the town of Kamianka.

It has an area of 641.3 square kilometres (247.6 mi^{2}) and a population of 11,455, as of 2020.

The hromada includes 9 settlements: the town of Kamianka and 21 villages:

- Berezhne
- Berezivka
- Bilmanka
- Vershyna
- Veseloivanivske
- Hoholivka
- Hruzke
- Husarka
- Druzhne
- Dubove
- Marianivka
- Myrske
- Novoukrainka
- Ocheretuvate
- Probudzhennia
- Samyilivka
- Svitle
- Smile
- Trudove
- Chervone Ozero
- Chervonoselivka

== See also ==
- List of hromadas of Ukraine
