= Ocheretuvate, Dubovyky rural hromada, Synelnykove Raion, Dnipropetrovsk Oblast =

Village in Synelnykove Raion, Dnipropetrovsk Oblast, Ukraine

Coordinates: 48.3412°N 36.0923°E

Ocheretuvate (Ukrainian: Очеретувате) is a village in Synelnykove Raion, Dnipropetrovsk Oblast, Ukraine.
