= Verbove, Polohy Raion, Zaporizhzhia Oblast =

Verbove Вербо́ве
- Village
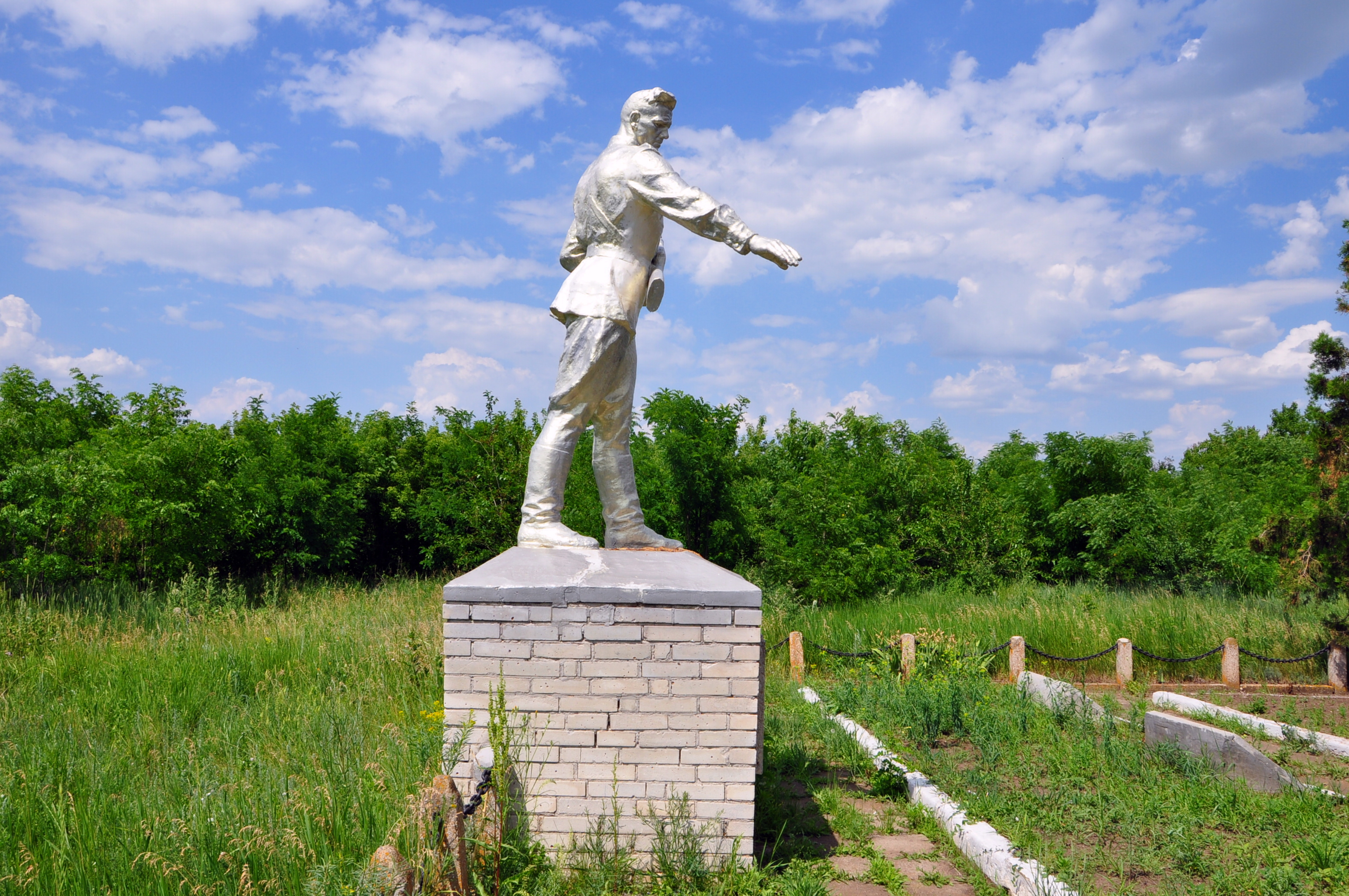
- Memorial of the fallen Red Army soldiers.

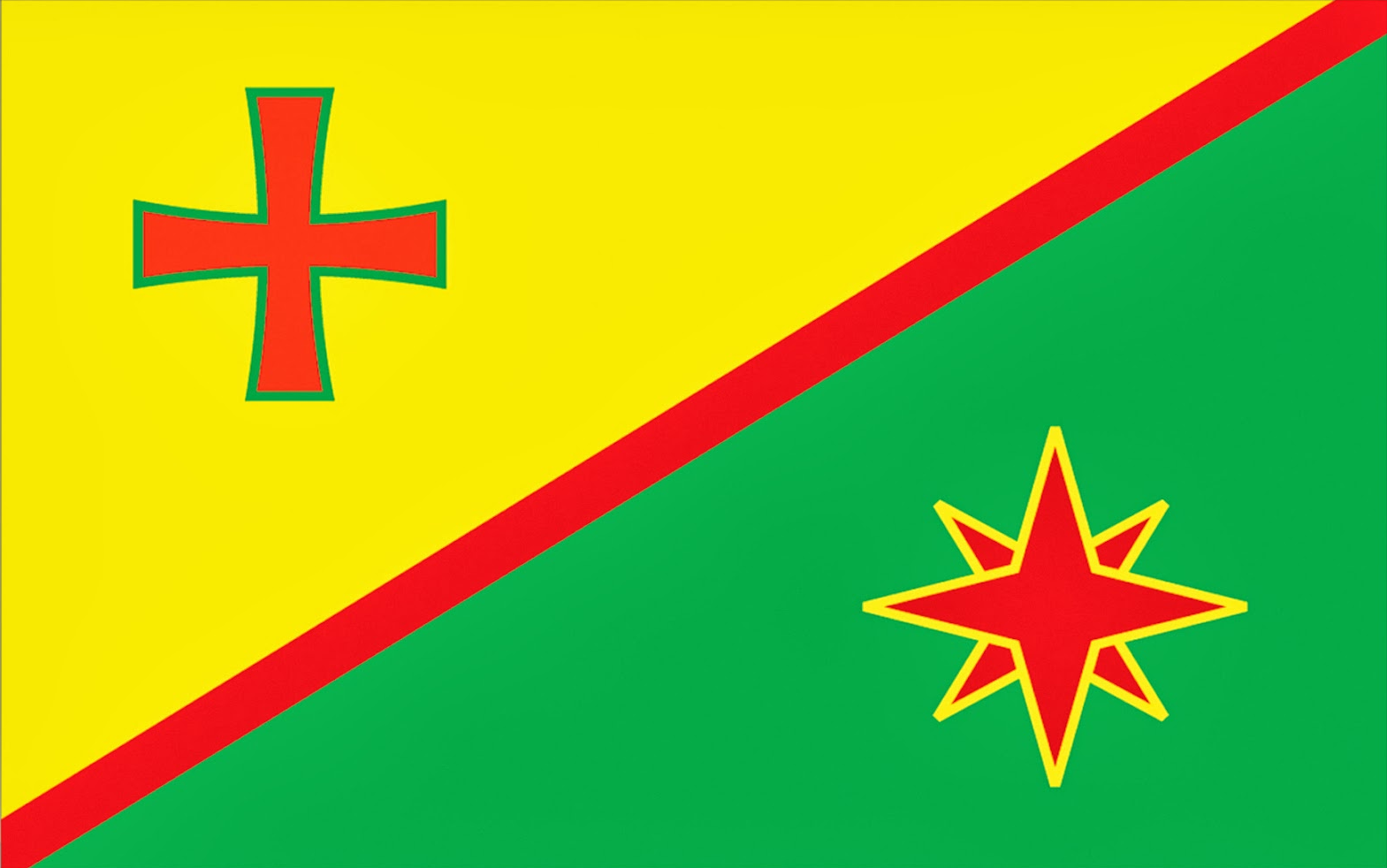
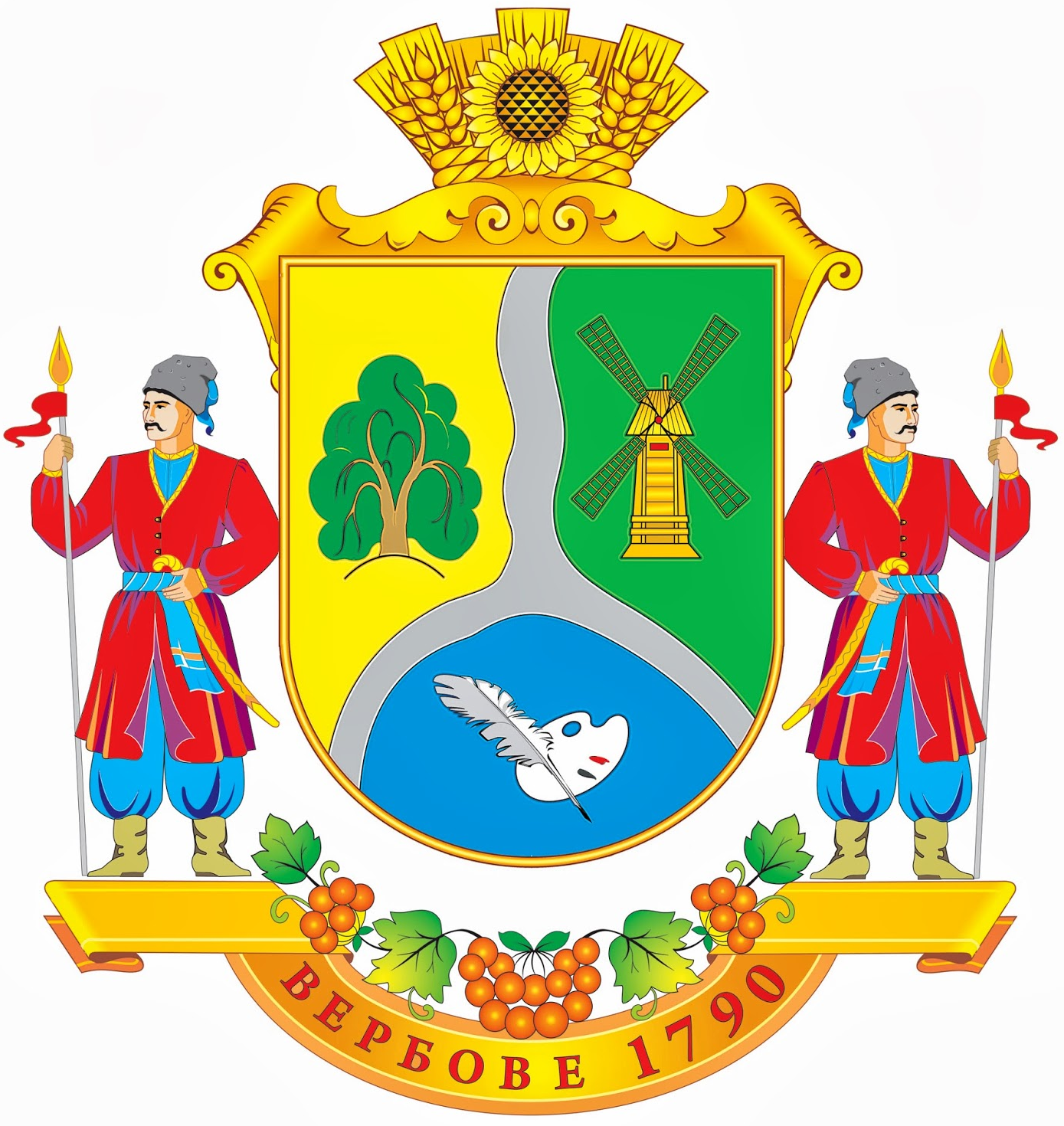
- Flag Seal
- Interactive map of Verbove
- Location of Verbove in Zaporizhzhia Oblast Verbove (Ukraine)
- Coordinates: 47°25′36″N 35°59′49″E
- Country: Ukraine
- Oblast: Zaporizhzhia Oblast
- Raion: Polohy
- Hromada: Polohy urban hromada
- Founded: 1790

Area
  - Total: 8,462 km^{2} (3,267 sq mi)

Population (2001)
  - Total: 1,238
  - Estimate (2024): 0
  - Density: 0.1463/km^{2} (0.3789/sq mi)
- Postal code: 70633
- Area code: +380 6165

Verbove (Ukrainian: Вербо́ве, pronounced [werˈbɔwe]) is a village in Polohy Raion, in the Zaporizhzhia Oblast of southern Ukraine. It is administratively located in Polohy urban hromada. It had a population of 1,246 as of 2001. A small river, the Verbova, flows north-westward through the village and on to Orikhiv, where it joins the Konka river.

== History ==
The village was founded in the 1790s by migrants from the Poltava region.

As a result of the Holodomor, a manmade famine in Soviet Ukraine in the early 1930s, 269 people in the village died.

=== Russo-Ukrainian War ===
During the Russian invasion of Ukraine phase of the Russo-Ukrainian War, in late February or early March 2022 (prior to the battle of Orikhiv), Verbove was occupied by Russian Ground Forces as part of its Southern Ukraine campaign. In June 2022, Russian forces destroyed the Second World War monument "Mother in Sorrow", which stood over a mass grave in the village cemetery where 972 Red Army soldiers are buried.

On 30 August 2023, during the 2023 Ukrainian counteroffensive, Ukrainian troops reached the northwestern outskirts of Verbove. On 6 September, Ukrainian troops advanced along the line of Russian fortifications and entered the northwestern part of the village. By January 2024, Russian forces were engaged in counter-offensive operations in areas close to the village. Ukrainian and Russian forces continue in small-scale engagements along the line of their positions between Verbove and Robotyne.
