= Yana Kholodna =

Ukrainian journalist

- Яна Холодна

Head of the Central TV and Radio Studio of the Ministry of Defense of Ukraine
- Succeeded by: Oleksii Chubashev

Personal details
- Born: Yana Oleksiivna Kholodna; Poltava
- Education: Poltava V.G. Korolenko National Pedagogical University

Military service
- Allegiance: Ukraine
- Branch/service: Ministry of Defense of Ukraine
- Rank: Colonel
- Awards: Honored Journalist of Ukraine

Yana Oleksiivna Kholodna (Ukrainian: Яна Олексіївна Холодна, birth in Poltava) is a Ukrainian journalist, presenter, communicator, media manager, colonel of the reserve of the Armed Forces of Ukraine. Honored Journalist of Ukraine (2017).

== Biography ==
Yana Kholodna is from the city of Poltava.

She graduated from the Faculty of Philology at the Poltava V.G. Korolenko National Pedagogical University.

She worked as a correspondent for a local TV channel and in the press service of the Ministry of Internal Affairs of Ukraine (2005–2014).

In 2015–2020, she served in the Armed Forces of Ukraine. She was the head of the Central TV and Radio Studio of the Ministry of Defense of Ukraine. She was involved in the reform of military media, in particular, she rebranded the Military Television of Ukraine and was one of the initiators of the creation and launch of the only military radio station Army FM. Head of the Department of Communication and Press of the Ministry of Defense (2019–2020).

Since 2020, she has been working on Channel 5, where she hosts the program "Secrets of War".

== Awards ==
- Honored Journalist of Ukraine (16 November 2017)
- Award "For Professional Work" (1 October 2019)
