= Orikhiv railway station =

Railway station in Zaporizhzhia Oblast, Ukraine

Orikhivska Оріхівська
- Station building

General information
- Location: Pryvokzalna Street, Orikhiv; Polohy Raion, Zaporizhzhia Oblast; Ukraine
- Coordinates: 47.5605012°N 35.7843462°E
- Owner: Ukrainian Railways
- Operator: Prydnipro Railways
- Distance: 725 km to Kyiv
- Platforms: 2
- Tracks: 9

Other information
- Station code: 464107

History
- Opened: 1904
Location

Orikhivska railway station is a railway station located on the Zaporizhzhia - Polohy line serving the city of Orikhiv and surrounding villages.

The station was opened in 1904.

The station closed in February 2022 due to the Russo-Ukrainian war.

== Services ==
Until February 2022, the following services called at the station;

- Zaporizhzhia – Polohy
- Kyiv - Berdiansk
- Moscow - Zaporizhzhia
- Moscow - Berdiansk
