= Polohy urban hromada =

Polohy urban hromada Пологівська міська громада
- Hromada
- Interactive map of Polohy urban hromada
- Country: Ukraine
- Oblast: Zaporizhzhia Oblast
- Raion: Polohy Raion
- Admin. center: Polohy

Area
  - Total: 804.31 km^{2} (310.55 sq mi)

Population (2020)
  - Total: 30,246
  - Density: 37.605/km^{2} (97.396/sq mi)
- CATOTTG code: UA23100190000020018
- Settlements: 23
- Cities: 1
- Villages: 22

Polohy urban hromada (Ukrainian: Пологівська міська громада) is a hromada of Ukraine, located in Polohy Raion, Zaporizhzhia Oblast. Its administrative center is the city Polohy.

It was formed on 30 March 2018 through the merger of local settlement councils in Polohy Raion.

It has an area of 804.9 kilometres (500.1 mi), and a population of 29,472.

== Composition ==
The hromada contains 1 city (Polohy) and 22 villages:

- Andriivske
- Bahate
- Basan
- Verbove
- Hryhorivka
- Dmytrivske
- Ivana Franka
- Inzhenerne
- Kostiantynivka
- Nova Dacha
- Novokarlivka
- Novofedorivka
- Ozherelne
- Pavlivske
- Polohy
- Reshetylivske
- Romanivske
- Semenivka
- Tarasivka
- Ukrainske
- Chumatske
- Shevchenkove

== History ==
On 30 July 2021, there were news reports about a project by the hromada to install water treatment systems in public places, to provide places like schools and hospitals with optimal water purification systems.

On 2 March 2022, the sale of alcoholic beverages was prohibited in the hromada in accordance with martial law during the Russian invasion of Ukraine.
