= Orikhiv =

City in Zaporizhzhia Oblast, Ukraine

Orikhiv Оріхів
- City
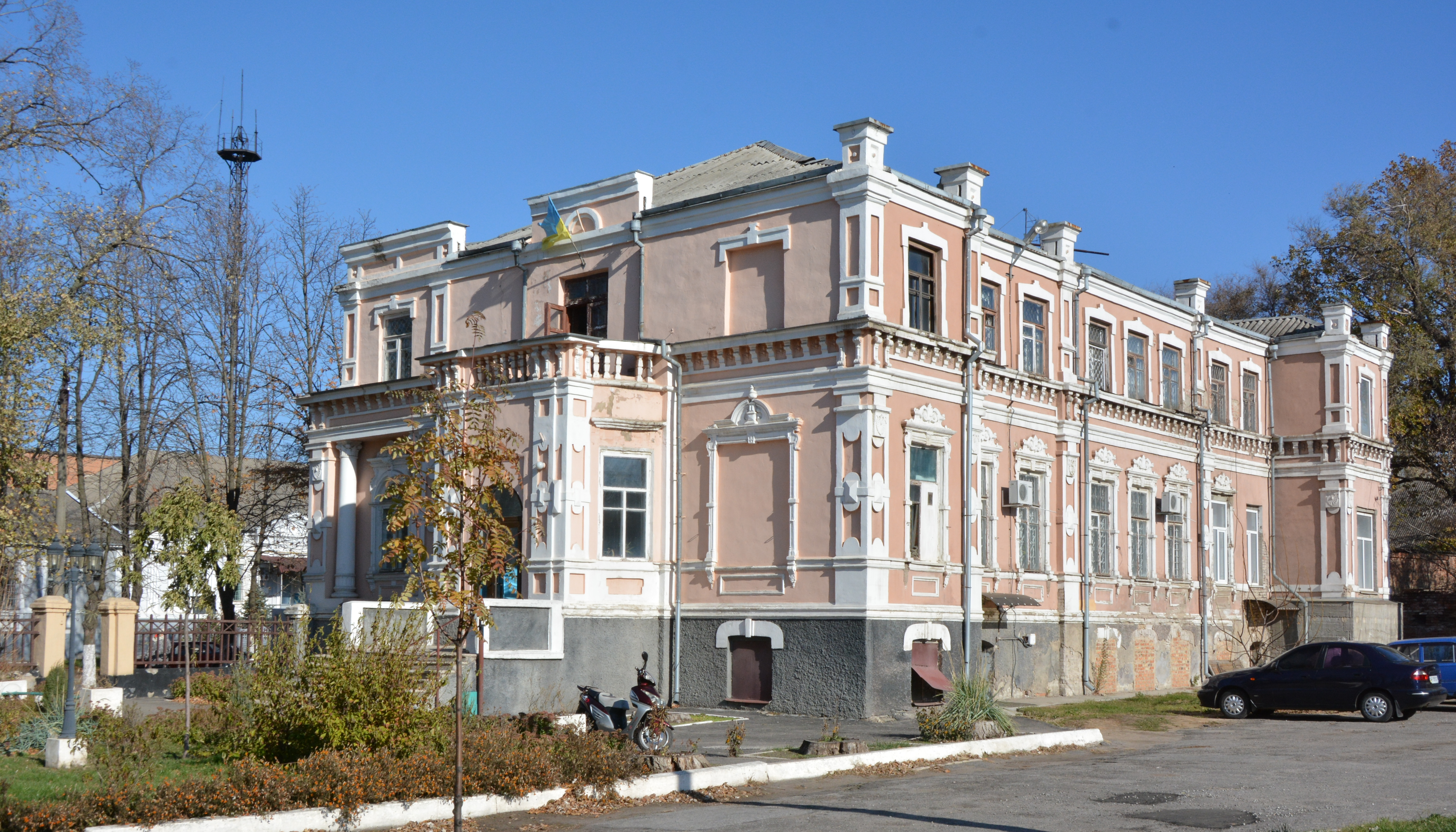
- Heinrich Janzen Manor, city mayor and manufacturer. Current seat of the Orikhiv urban hromada.

- Flag Coat of arms
- Interactive map of Orikhiv
- Location of Orikhiv in Zaporizhia Oblast Location of Orikhiv in Ukraine
- Coordinates: 47°34′10″N 35°46′40″E
- Country: Ukraine
- Oblast: Zaporizhzhia Oblast
- Raion: Polohy Raion
- Hromada: Orikhiv urban hromada
- Founded: 1775
- Incorporated: 1801
- City status: 1938

Area
  - Total: 10 km^{2} (3.9 sq mi)

Population (2025)
  - Total: 600
  - Density: 60/km^{2} (160/sq mi)
- All but 6,000 evacuated during the 2022 Russian invasion.
- Postal code: 70500
- Area code: +380 6141
- Climate: Dfa

Orikhiv (Ukrainian: Оріхів, IPA: [oˈr⁽ʲ⁾ixiu̯]; Russian: Орехов, romanized: Orekhov, IPA: [ɐˈrʲexəf]) is a city in Polohy Raion, Zaporizhzhia Oblast, southern Ukraine. It had an estimated population of 13,896, as of 1 January 2022. Early in the 2022 Russian invasion of Ukraine, many residents were evacuated, with 6,000 remaining by August, and the city being shelled constantly by Russian artillery. In February 2024, it was estimated that around 1,000-1,400 people remained in Orikhiv.

== Name ==
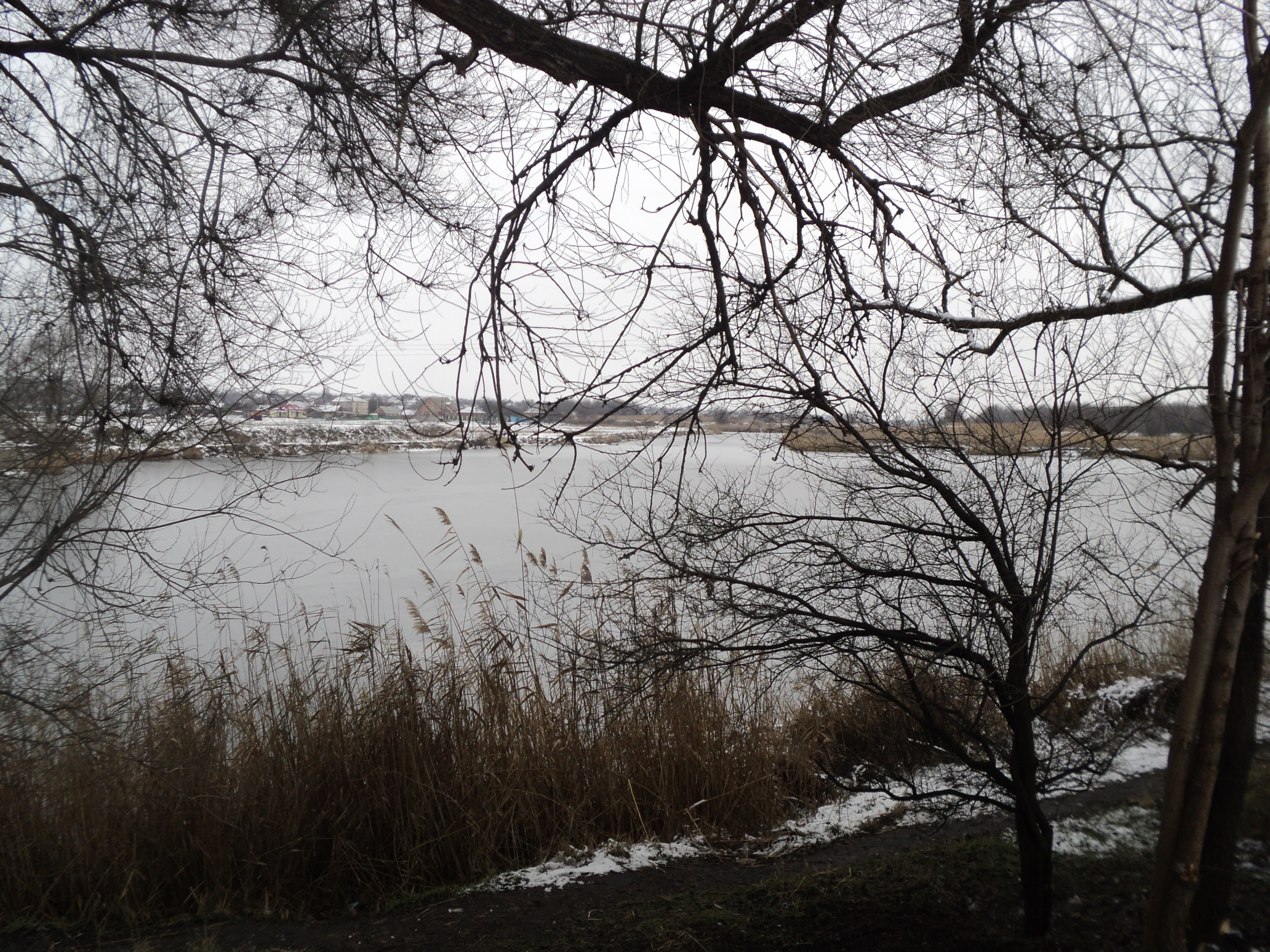
Kinska river near Orikhiv.

There are several versions of the origin of the name of the city of Orekhiv. One version says that most of the settlers who settled on the banks of the Kinska river were from the village of Orekhivka in Poltava Governorate and in memory of their homeland they named the new settlement Orekhiv when in 1787 the natives of those places massively moved to new lands. According to one version, the settlement was named after a beam in which many peanuts grew, thickets of hazel, groundnuts and water nuts, which were abundant in the shallow reaches of the then full-flowing Kinska River.

== Geography ==
The city of Orikhiv is located on the left bank of the Kinska river—a left tributary of the Dnipro, 63 km southeast of the regional center and around 70 km from Melitopol. Upstream at a distance of 2 km is the village of Mala Tokmachka, downstream at a distance of 1 km is the village of Novopavlivka, on the opposite bank— the village of Preobrazhenka.

== History ==
=== 18th and 19th century ===
Orikhiv was founded in 1775 near the Konka river after the fall of the Zaporozhian Sich. It is situated about 50 km (31.07 mi) southeast of Zaporizhzhia (formerly Oleksandrivsk), and almost the same distance north of the Molochna Kolonia (literally, 'milk colony'). The village was settled by Peasants, Cossacks and soldiers from Chernihiv. By 1786 the village had 20-30 households.

On 19 February 1801, the state-owned village was transferred to the category of cities and became the new center of the Mariupol uezd which was formed in 1797 with the village of Tokmak as its centre.

Orikhiv later became the centre of Melitopolsky Uyezd.

In 1818 Orikhiv appeared to be a place where Russian Imperial military personnel were stationed; an officer from Orikhiv came out to finalize arrangements for the tsar's visit to Lindenau in May of that year. As early as 1836 a "Salt Road" (Tschumakemveg) connected Orikhiv with Perekop to the south, the road running through the Molochna Kolonia. This road was still shown on maps of 1852. In 1850 Orikhiv was within the boundaries of Taurida Govenorate, near its northeastern border. A railway constructed to connect Oleksandrivsk to Berdyansk, it went through Orikhiv, presumably to help development of the city and give easy port access at Berdyansk.

Half of Orikhiv burned down in a large fire in 1842. Orikhiv lost its status as a county town, and became a Provincial town, with the centre of Melitopolsky Uyezd being moved to Tokmak.

The first Mennonites likely settled in Orikhiv as early as the 1830s. By 1852 there were two windmills in Orikhiv owned by Mennonites (Kornelius Ediger and Kornelius Heinrichs) as well as a treadmill and oil press operated by Aaron Wiens. In the 1860s a number of families moved from Schoenwiese of the Chortitza Colony to Orikhiv. Among these was Johann Heinrich (Ivan Andreievitch) Janzen, who built two large steam-powered flour mills and encouraged other Mennonite businessmen to follow his example.

By 1874 the small Mennonite community, in cooperation with the equally small Lutheran group, had built a church and a school. Apparently the Mennonites and Lutherans had joint services in the church, but for major festivals the Mennonites tended to go to their home churches, for many this being Schoenwiese in the Chortitza Colony. They also went back to their home churches to allow the young people to meet prospective marriage partners.

In 1874 Johann Heinrich (Ivan Andreievich) Janzen was elected mayor of Orikhiv. Despite some opposition from the business community because Janzen was German, the governor of the province encouraged him to continue in his position. Orikhiv was one of the few cities with a positive balance sheet despite an aggressive school building program. Janzen retired in 1899. At the end of the nineteenth century, of a population of 10,000, there were only about 200 "Germans" in total (called niemsty), which included approximately equal numbers of Mennonites and Lutherans. Only one Mennonite estate, Rosenheim (Epp) was listed as being close to Orikhiv, while Wintergruen Estate was 14 verst (15 kilometres) east-southeast of the city. These estates no longer exist.

A branch of Krieger's agricultural machinery factory opened in Orikhiv in 1895, which produced reapers and haymakers.

=== 20th century ===
Peter Kondratyevitch Pavlenko was principal of the Halbstadt Zentralschule in 1909 and 1910, also teaching in the areas of mathematics and pedagogy; before that he had been on the faculty of the secondary school in Orikhiv. In 1918–1919 Orikhiv was in the centre of the area controlled by the anarchist Nestor Makhno. During the subsequent Civil War it was overrun a number of times as the vicissitudes of war caused frequent changes in the struggles between the Whites and the Reds. Orikhiv was the base from which the Red Army surged southward to finally defeat the Mennonite Selbstschutz – eventually leading to the capitulation in Gnadenfeld, Molotschna (today Bohdanivka).

310 residents of the town died in the Holodomor in 1932-1933.

Orikhiv attained city status in 1938. Two Collective Farms were established in 1943: Orikhivsky and Dymytrov, which became a poultry farm in 1963. The city was heavily destroyed in World War II, and was rebuilt in the 1950s.

In 1972 it was the capital of the Orikhiv Raion of Zaporizhzhia Oblast. The population was 21,200 in 1990. Main industries produced clothing, machinery and building supplies. There is a metallurgy plant, Orikhiv Quarry of Molding Materials, which deals with refractory materials, and a sugar refinery. The city also has a regional museum. There are no obvious traces of the Mennonite past remaining.

The statue to Vladimir Lenin was dismantled on 17 March 2015.

Orikhiv became part of the Orikhiv urban hromada on 11 November 2016.

Orikhiv became part of the Polohy Raion on 19 July 2020 following the abolition of Tokmak Raion.

=== Russo-Ukrainian war (2022–present) ===
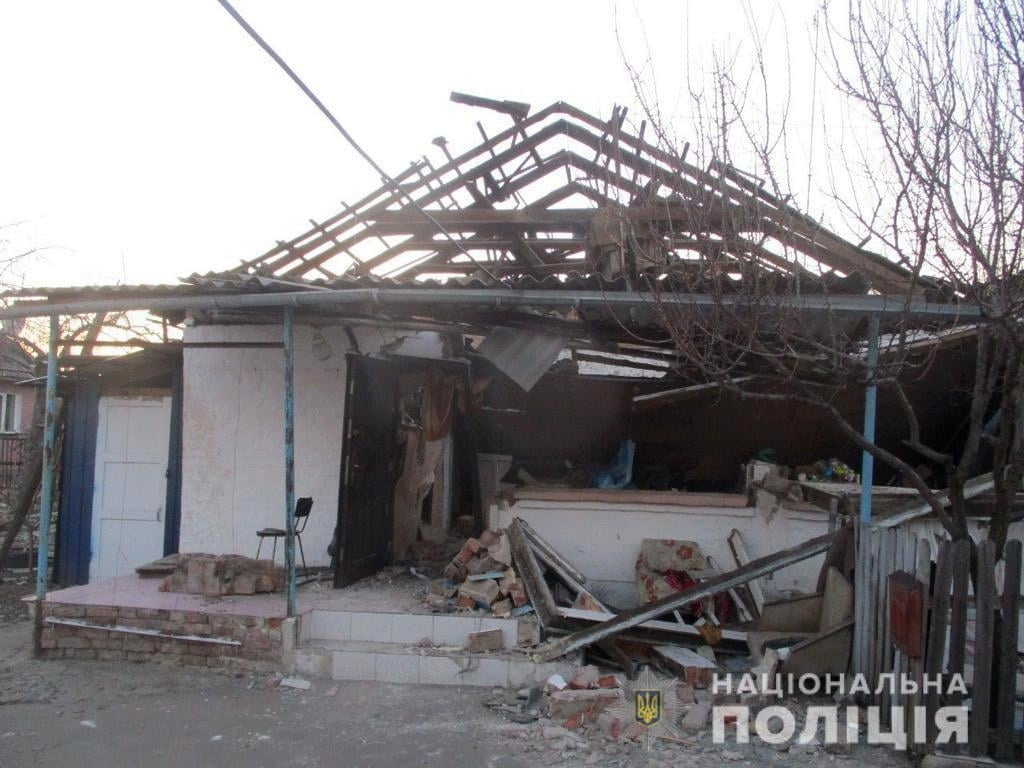
House destroyed by Russian shelling in March 2022

Early in the 2022 Russian invasion of Ukraine, as many residents as possible were evacuated from Orikhiv. By late April 2022, Russian lines were three miles away and Russian artillery was shelling the town constantly. On 7 May 2022, around 21:00, Orikhiv hospital was shelled by Russian forces. According to the local government, Russian forces wanted to finish off the wounded and kill civilian doctors. On 21 May, local media reported that as a result of the Russian shelling, the gymnasium, and the building of the city executive committee were destroyed.

According to OCHA, by 17 August the town's population had dwindled to 6,000. As of October 2022, Russian forces were regularly shelling Orikhiv; according to the city's deputy mayor, 70% of Orikhiv had been destroyed.

In April 2023, Orikhiv's deputy mayor Svitlana Mandrich reported that Russian missile strikes had been so constant that the 2,000 residents who remained in Orikhiv rarely left their basement shelters. She reported that 30 civilians had been killed in Orikhiv since the shelling began. In June 2023, CNN reported that only 1,400 civilians remained in the city, mainly living in basements and makeshift bunkers. In October 2023 it was reported that the Russians were bombing the city 25 to 30 times a day and that there were very few undamaged houses in the city.

In January 2024, it was reported that not a single high-rise building in Orikhiv was left standing and that the city had been without gas and electricity since March 2022. On 21 February 2024, a Russian 550-pound glide bomb tore through the dome of the Church of the Intercession of the Blessed Virgin Mary located in the center of Orikhiv. In March 2024, Orikhiv was characterized by The Economist as a "ghost town", as an estimated 1,000 civilians remained in the city, with every building said to have been either damaged or destroyed.

During 2025, after the capture of Velyka Novoselika, Russian forces launched a large attack through the eastern boundaries of Zaporizhia Oblast, capturing Huliapole at the end of the year. This made Orikhiv a more significant target, as it was the western-most major settlement on the southern front. This led to Russian forces placing more pressure onto the city. In February, increasing air and multiple launch rocket system (MLRS) strikes on the city by Russian forces began. More Russian ground units were also deployed near the city, including motorized rifle units, airborne regiments, and a special forces brigade.

On 14 September 2026, the Russians struck the minibus to Zaporizhzhia with an FPV drone.

A russian FAB-3000 aerial bomb hit the city in July 2026.

== Monuments ==
- Heinrich Janzen Manor
- House of Trade Rows
- Female Gymnasium
- Tavern
- Male School

== Industry ==
A car repair plant was constructed in 1937. Following World War II, the plant changed to produce farm equipment, and was renamed to Orselmash in 1961.

The Institute for the Production of Fertilizer Spreaders was closed due to staff outflow and a decline in production. Due to the dire economic situation in Ukraine, the state-owned Orselmash plant suspended operations in the late 1990s. The plant boasted unique equipment: gear-cutting machines and a line of six 1,000-ton embossing presses. In the early 2000s, the Orikhiv Agricultural Machinery Plant "Agrotech" resumed its work.

Due to Russia's invasion of Ukraine and active military action in the Orikhiv area, the plants ceased production. Part of the Orikhivselmash building was damaged by Russian artillery shelling.

== Transport ==
The city of Orikhiv has a railway station Orikhivska on the Kryvyi Rih — Zaporizhzhia — Polohy. The city is crossed by the national highway N-08 (Boryspil — Zaporizhzhia — Mariupol), as well as the territorial highways T-0812, T-0815 and T-0408. Before the Russian invasion of Ukraine, bus services to Dnipro, Berdyansk, etc. were operated from the Orikhiv bus station.

== Education ==
- Municipal institution "Support institution of general secondary education "Suzir'ya"" (destroyed on 3 April 2023);
- Orikhiv secondary school of I-II grades No. 3;
- Orikhiv educational complex No. 2;
- Orikhiv secondary school of I-III grades No. 5;
- VSP "Orikiv College of the Dmytro Motorny State Technical University";
- Orikhiv vocational lyceum No. 33.

== Demographics ==
=== Population ===
1897	1959	1979	1989	2001	2016	2021
5996	12 945	19 366	21 253	17 955	14 991	14 136

According to the 2001 Ukrainian census, the population was 17,986 people. Ethnic groups according to the same census:

Ethnic groups in Orikhiv
	percent
Ukrainians	89.86%
Russians	8.82%
Belarusians	0.38%
Armenians	0.21%
Bulgarians	0.19%
Germans	0.07%

Native language according to the 2001 Ukrainian census:

Native languages in Polohy
	percent
Ukrainian	90.2%
Russian	9.3%
Others	0.5%

The population of the city in 2024 was 800.

== Notable people ==
- Vsevolod Lazaryan — Soviet mechanical scientist was born in the city.
- From 1929 to 1935, priest Ivan (Blyumovich) served in the city.
- Prikhodko, Ivan Prokofievich — a native of the city, Hero of the Soviet Union.
- Andriy Hlushchenko — Ukrainian footballer
- Valeriy Dudka — Soviet and Ukrainian footballer

== Gallery ==
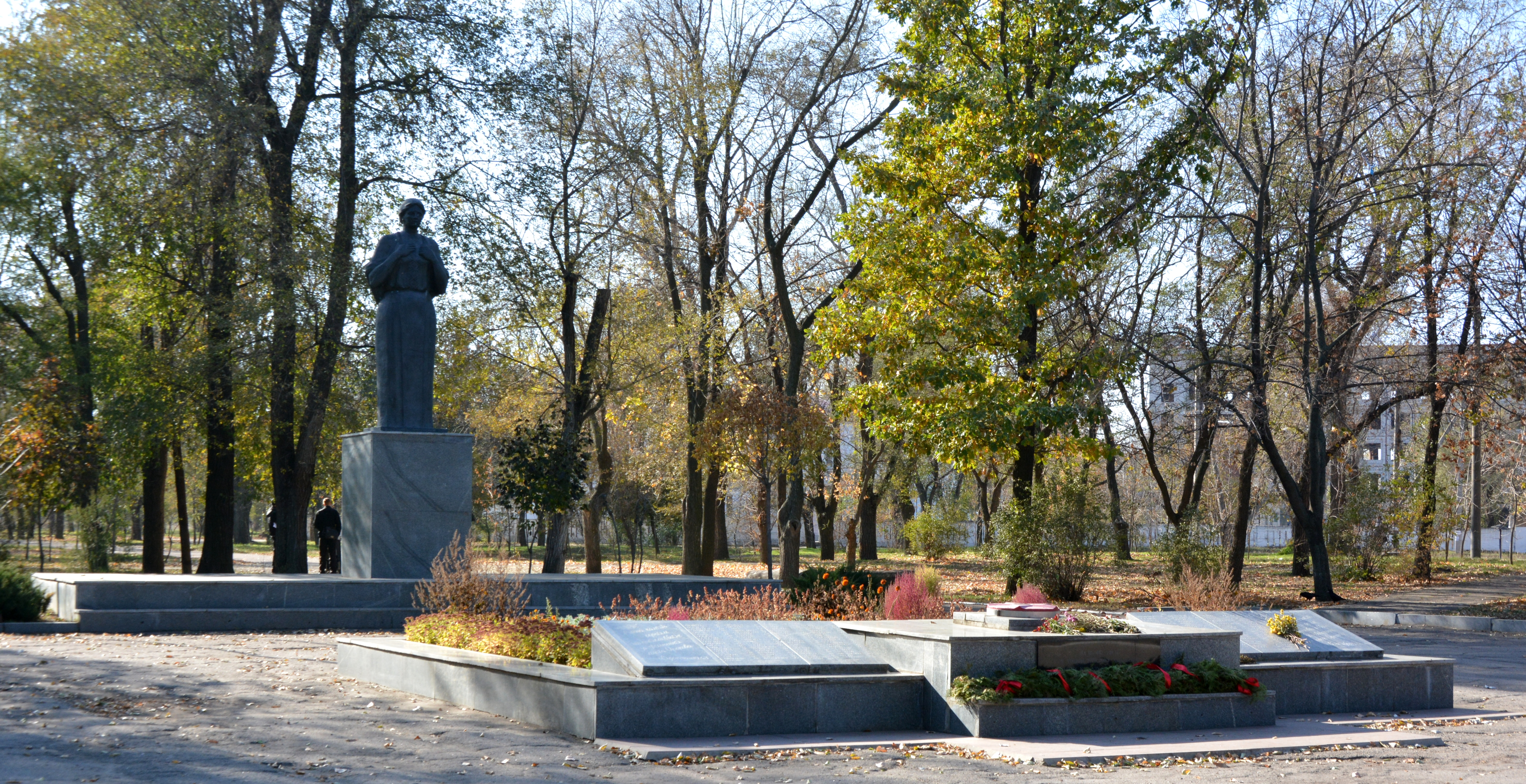
World War II memorial

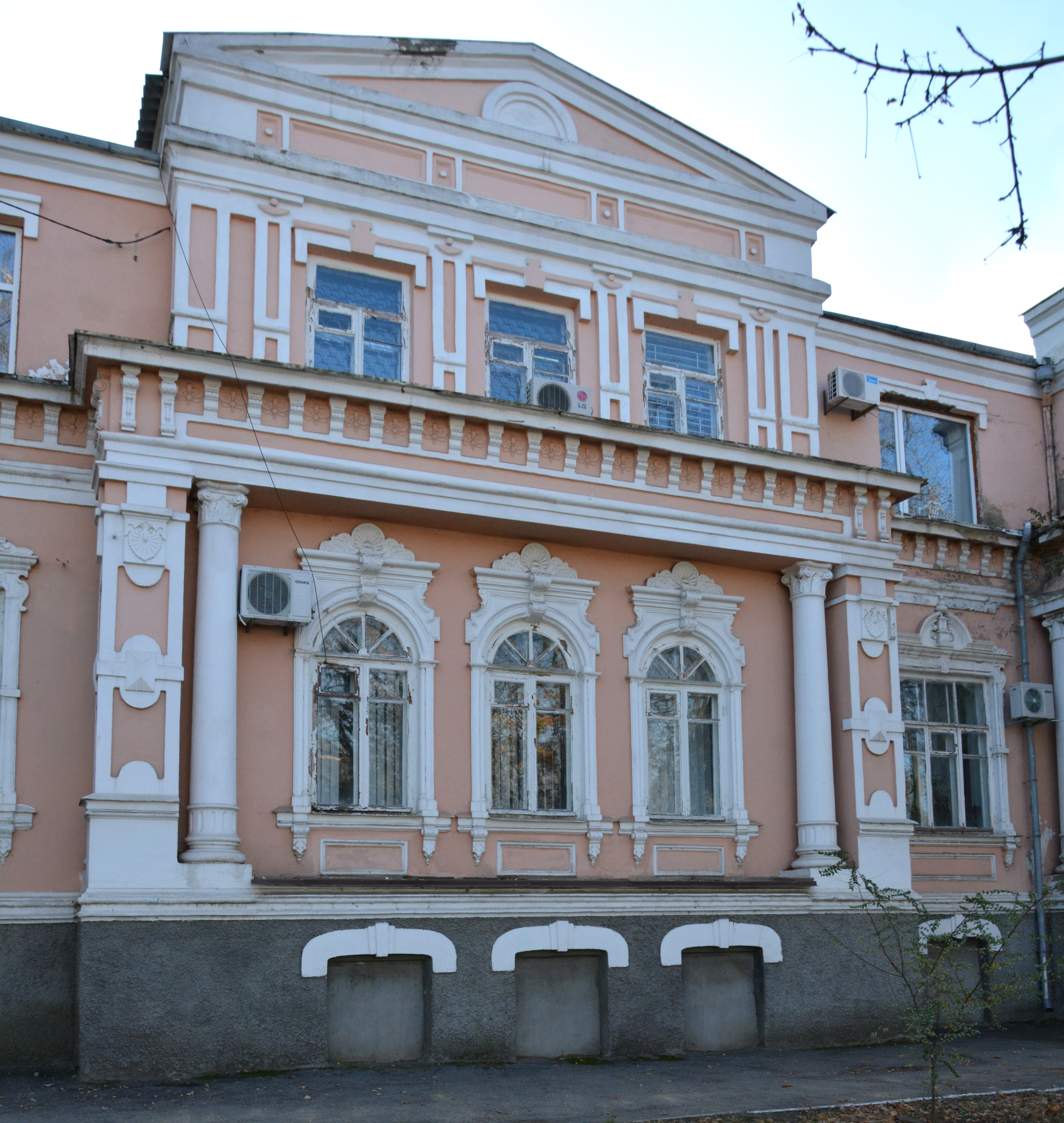
Detail of mansion house of Heinrich Janzen city mayor of Orikhiv in 1874-1899

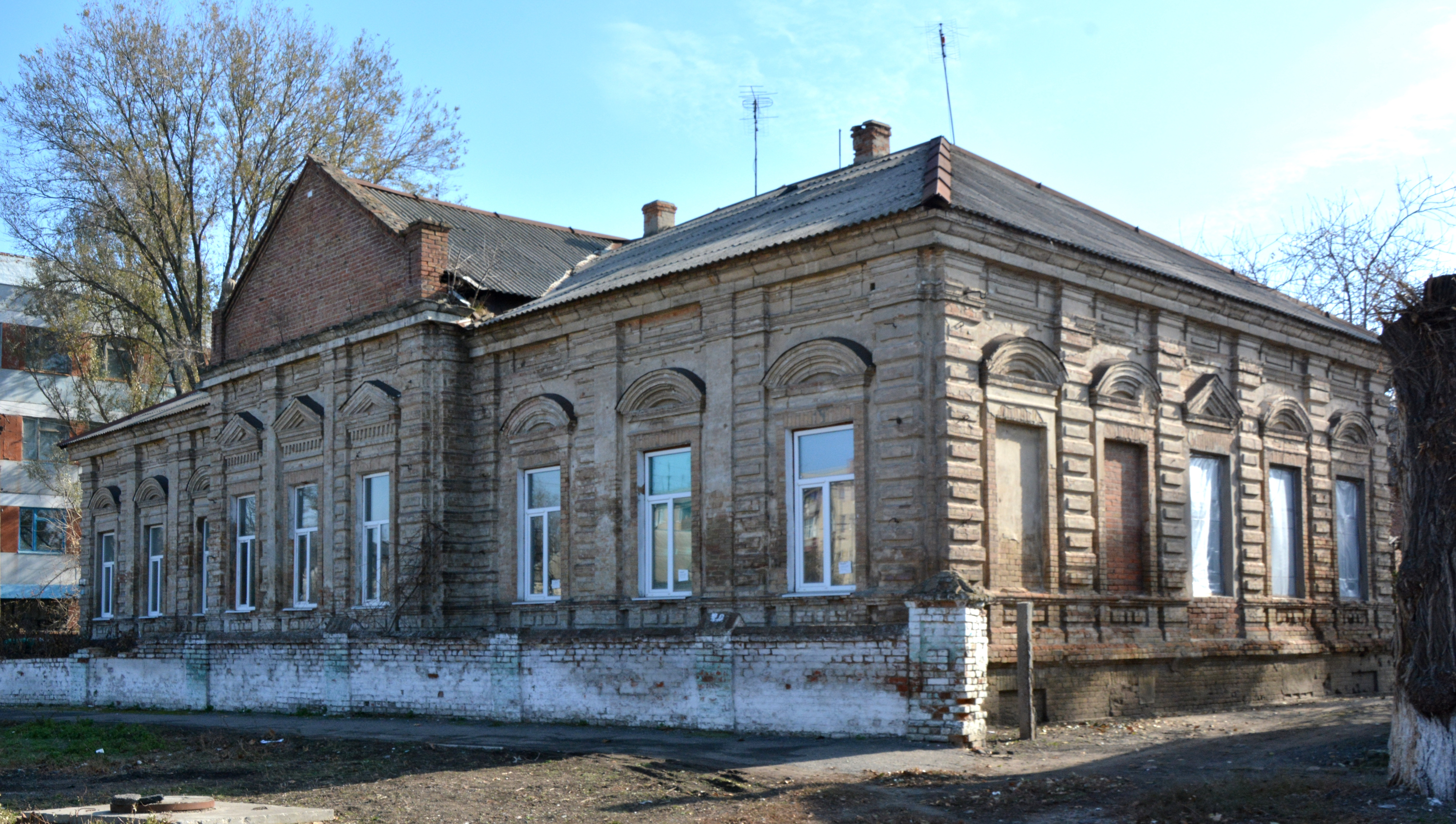
Office house of mills of Heinrich Janzen

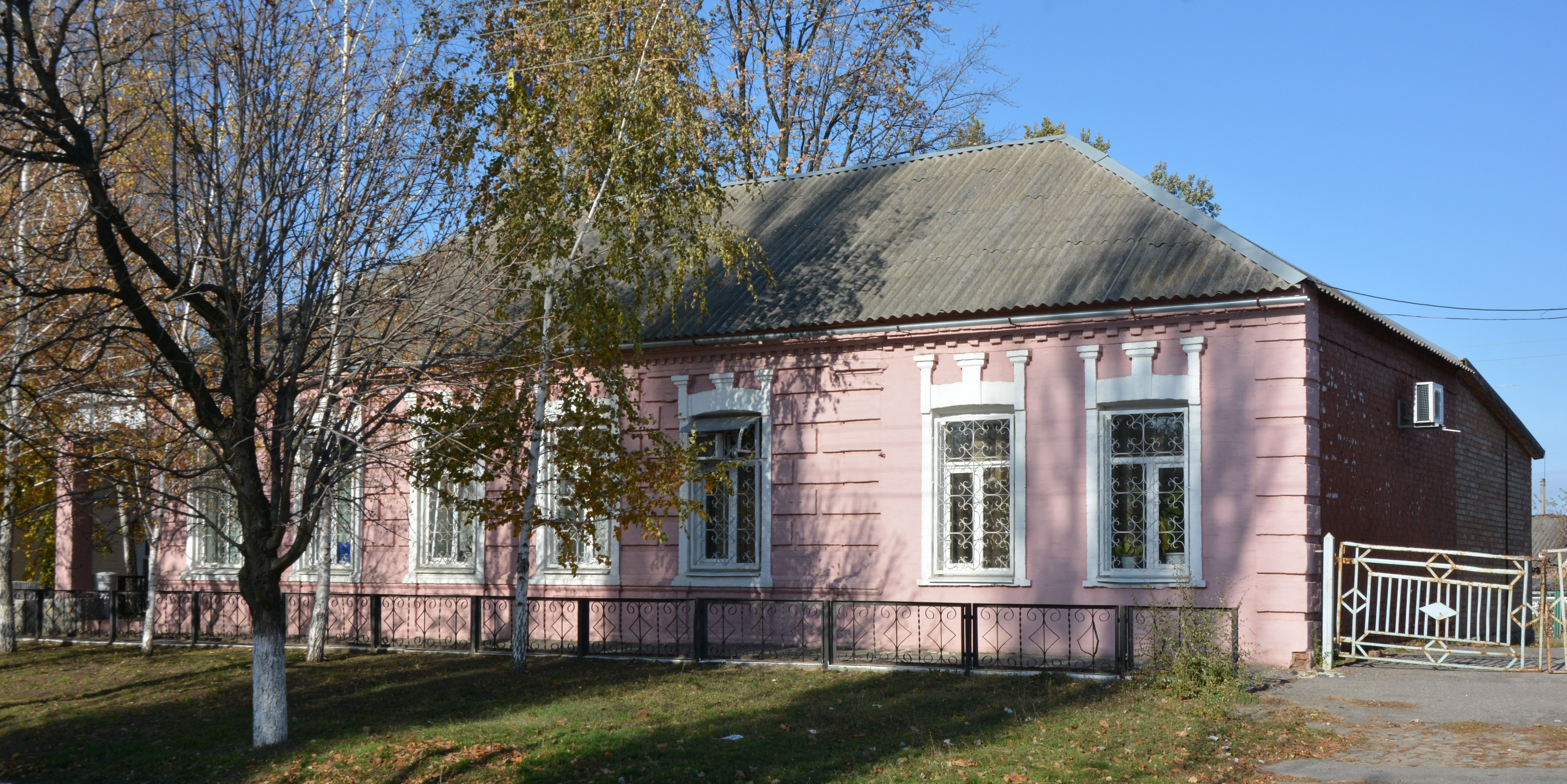
Old town council

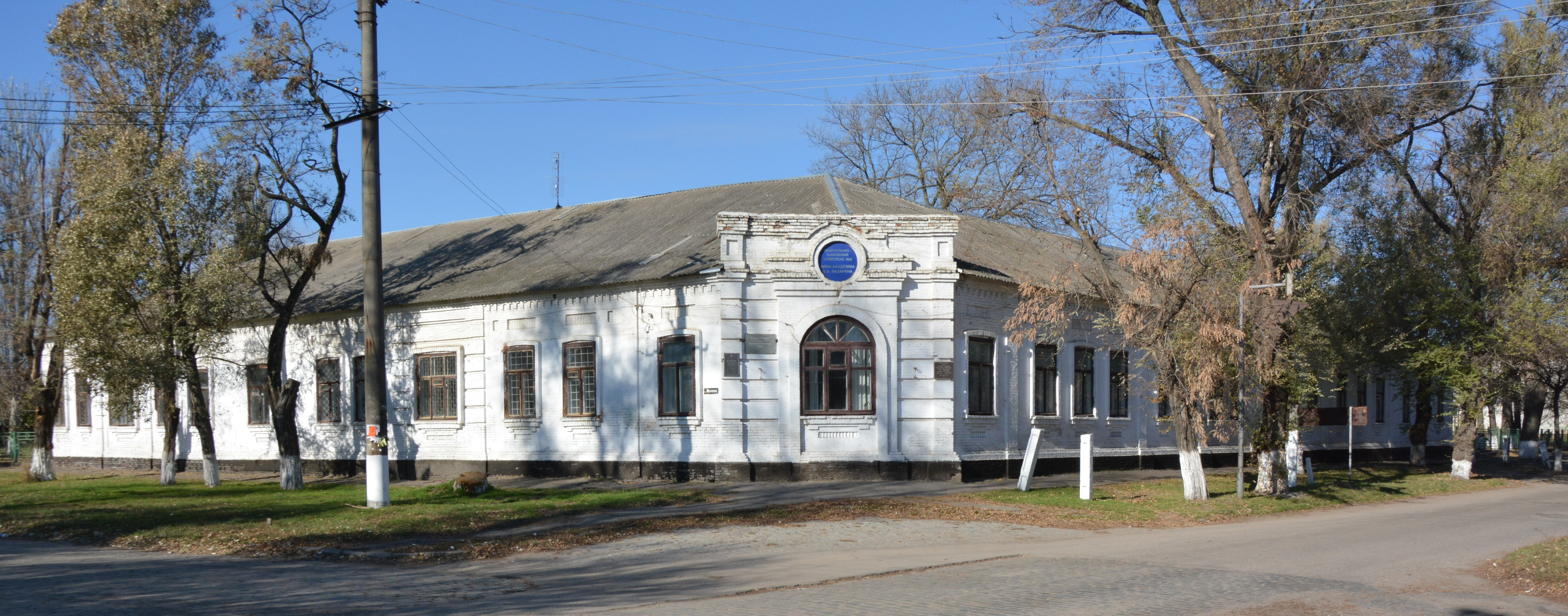
Old Gymnasium for girls

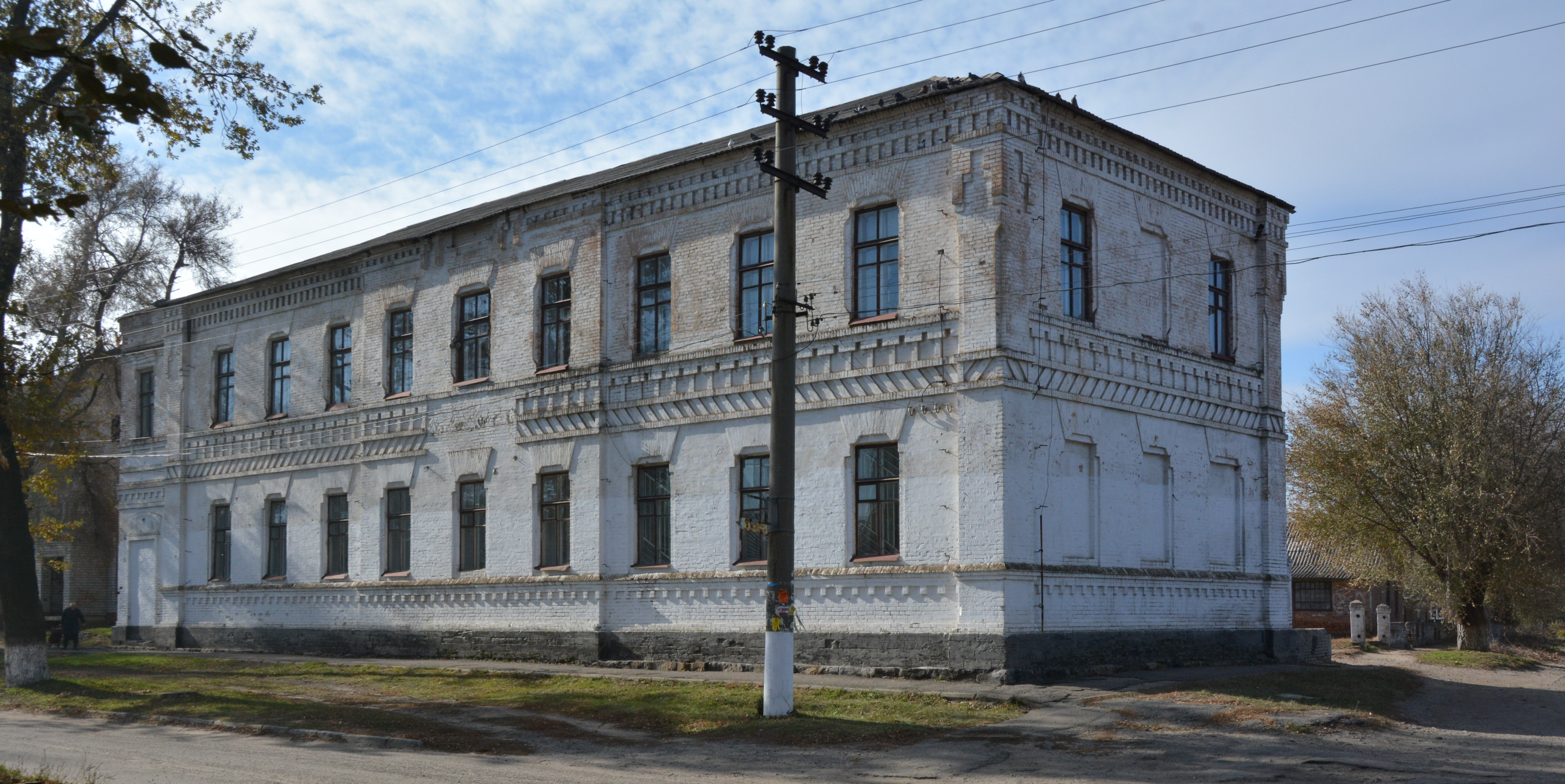
Old non-classical secondary school for boys

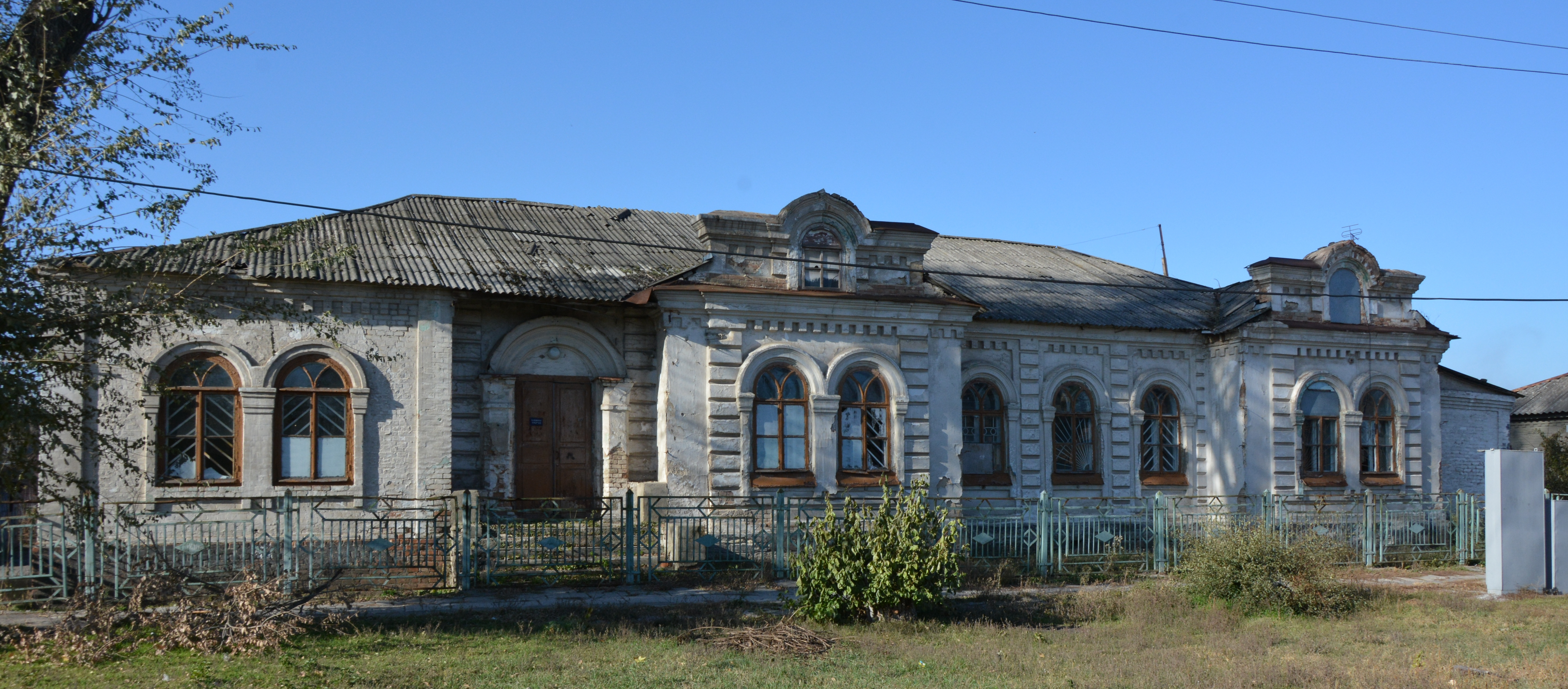
Post station

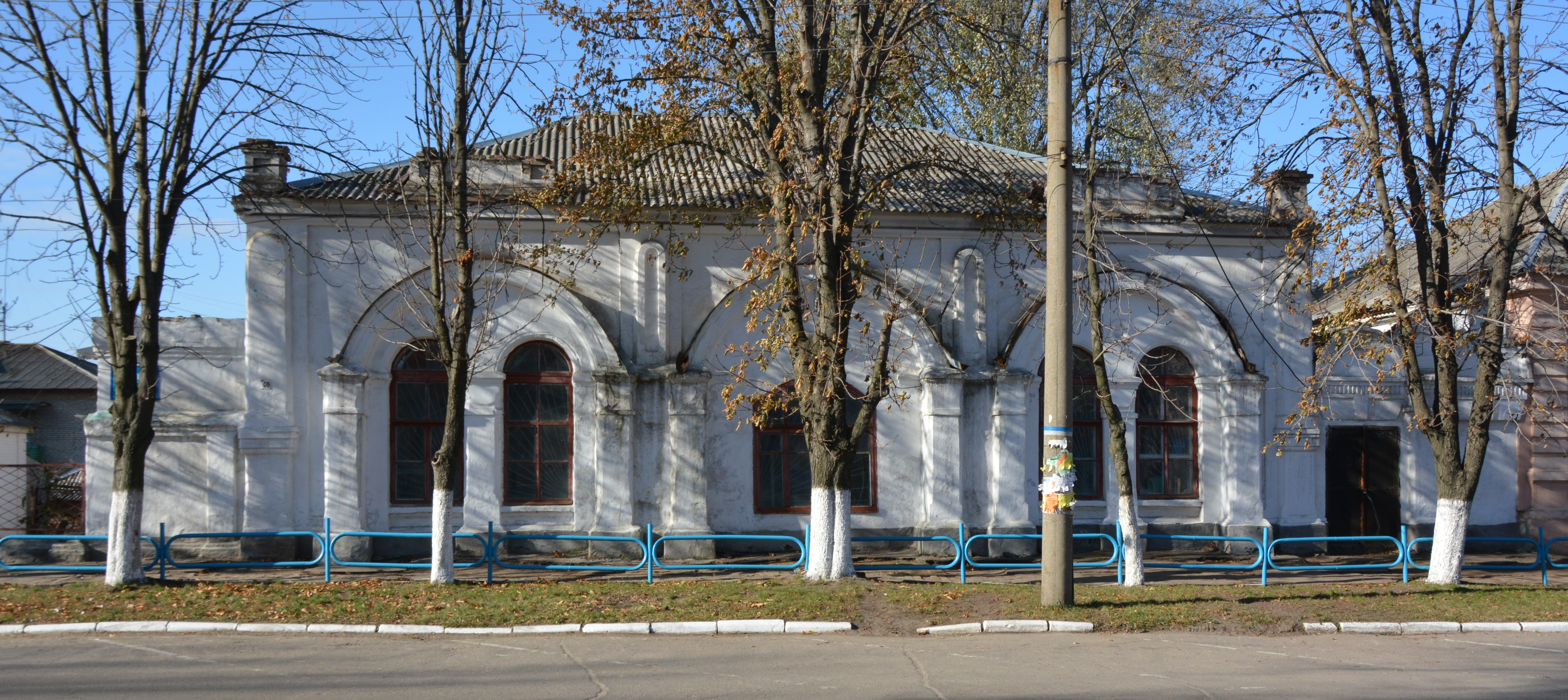
First victualling-house in Orikhiv
