= Viktor Poltavets =

Viktor Vasylyovych Poltavets (Ukrainian: Віктор Васильович Полтавець; 1925–2003) was a Soviet and Ukrainian artist, Merited Art Worker of Ukraine (visual, 1974), National Artist of Ukraine (visual, 1984), member of the National Society of Artists of Ukraine (1952).

Viktor Poltavets was born in Polohy (today Zaporizhia Oblast) on January 11, 1925. In 1950 he graduated from the Kharkiv Art Institute, now known as the Kharkiv State Academy of Design and Arts. Poltavets primarily specialized in painting and drawing.

Among his awards are orders the Badge of Honour (1982), the Patriotic War (2000) as well as some medals. Poltavets is buried at the Baikove Cemetery, Kyiv.

== Works ==
- "Attack's repelled" (1950);
- "Arsenalites" (1959);
- illustrations to books of Nechuy-Levytsky "Mykola Dzherya" and "Kaidashev Family" (1960);
- "Red Cossacks" (1963);
- "Haidamaky" (1964);
- "Moment of rest" (1965);
- Triptych "Oleksandr Parkhomenko" (1967);
- "Couriers" (1970);
- "Partizan land" (1971);
- "Collective farm affairs" (1975);
- "End of war" (1978);
- "Svyatoslav" (1982);
- "Breakthrough" (1983);
- "Bugler" (1984);
- "Eaglet" (1988);
- landscape series "Chernihiv Region" (1985—1990);
- "Spring waters" (1990);
- "Bohdan Khmelnytsky and his associates — Kryvonis and Bohun" (2000).

Number of illustration to works of Taras Shevchenko, Ivan Le, Dmitriy Furmanov.
