= Myrne, Orikhiv urban hromada, Polohy Raion =

Myrne
- Location in Ukraine Myrne (Zaporizhzhia Oblast)
- Country: Ukraine
- Website: Official website

Myrne (Ukrainian: Мирне) a village in Polohy Raion, Zaporizhia Oblast, Ukraine. It is administratively incorporated as part of Orikhiv urban hromada. In 2011, it had a population of 830.

== History ==
It was founded as Yaseny (Ukrainian: Ясени) in 1928 and remained under that name until 1961.
