= Spirit of America (charity) =

American nonprofit organization

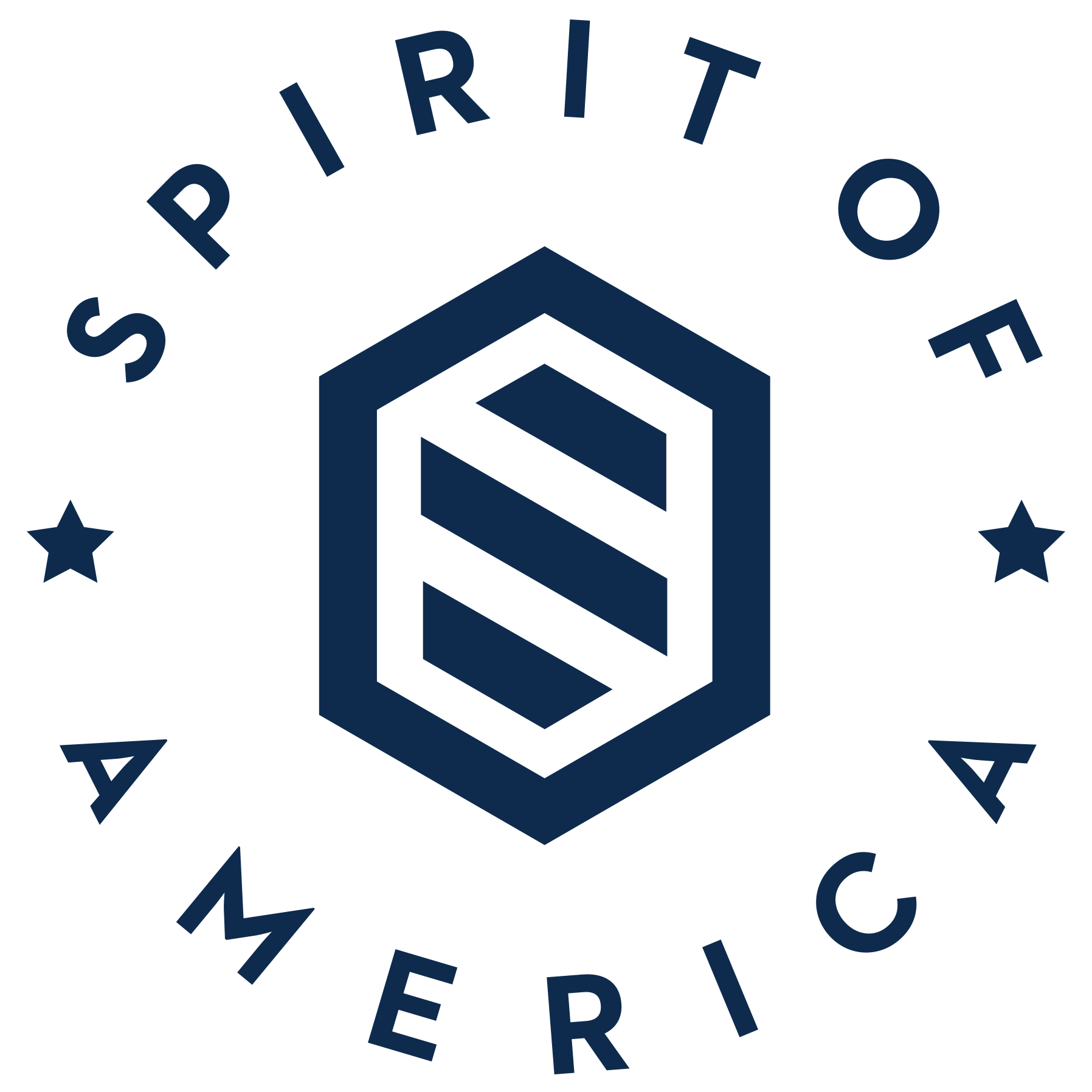
- Formation: 2003
- Founder: Jim Hake
- Type: Non-governmental organization Nonprofit organization 501(c)(3)
- Tax ID no.: 20-1687786
- Headquarters: 3033 Wilson Blvd., Suite 700 Arlington, VA 22201
- CEO: Jim Hake
- CFO: Kimberly Getz
- Revenue: $50,573,155 (FYE December 2022)
- Website: spiritofamerica.org

Spirit of America (SoA) is a US non-governmental and 501(c)(3) nonprofit organization that works alongside American military personnel and diplomats to promote American values abroad by saving and improving lives. The organization provides material goods, programs, and personnel to help the United States Government achieve its objectives. Spirit of America was founded in 2003 by Los Angeles based venture capitalist, Jim Hake, who in the wake of the September 11th attacks sought to directly support conventional military and special operation teams performing reconstruction efforts in Iraq and Afghanistan. The Charity Navigator gave Spirit of America an overall 4-star rating for 2019 fiscal year.

== History ==
Spirit of America was established in 2003 by Jim Hake in response to the September 11th terror attacks. Inspired by the efforts of an Army special operations team building positive relationships with Afghan villagers by teaching them the game of baseball, Jim Hake sought to create an organization that would allow donations from American citizens to directly support the efforts of servicemembers and diplomats on the ground.

== Current efforts ==
=== 2010–2020 ===
By 2010, the organization had evolved from resourcing mission essential items to military personnel in overseas into an organization with an institutional memory, a network of local partners, and a strategic vision on how to best assist American forces conducting civil-military operations. Mr. Hake worked to formalize the ties between commanders in Afghanistan and his organization as a "Commander Support Program" (CSP) with support from senior Marine officers "who had developed a good working relationship with the group in Iraq". This resulted in scrutiny from Pentagon lawyers, who argued that sending goods to commanders violated ethics rules. With help from John Bellinger, Jeh Johnson, General Joe Dunford and General Jim Mattis, the rules were changed to allow the CSP to operate.

In 2014 a report cited SoA's ability to get resources in the right military hands quickly due to its private non-bureaucratic nature and that the materials arrived quickly which was a relief after traditionally dealing with "hierarchical delays in seeking funding support" prior to SoA involvement in Afghanistan.

Working with the US Embassy in Kyiv, in 2016 Spirit of America funded the establishment and optimization of Army FM, a Ukrainian Ministry of Defense radio station that provides information and entertainment to soldiers defending their country in eastern Ukraine, who are suffering from a barrage of Russian propaganda.

In 2018, SoA was recognized by Congress through that year’s NDAA and approved by the Department of Defense to perform official work with the US Military abroad.

SoA has provided aid to American efforts in Syria, Mongolia, and Vietnam.

=== 2020–present ===
Following the fall of Kabul to Taliban forces in August 2021, Spirit of America launched an Afghanistan Emergency Fund to support Afghan evacuees. SoA supported efforts to evacuate at-risk Afghan civilians, including interpreters and their families, in support of the US military’s Operation Allies Refuge.

During the 2022 Russian invasion of Ukraine, Spirit of America provided humanitarian and non-lethal military assistance to the Ukrainian government, including issuing protective equipment to the Territorial Defense Forces.
