= Oleksii Chubashev =

Ukrainian military journalist (1991–2022)

- Олексій Чубашев
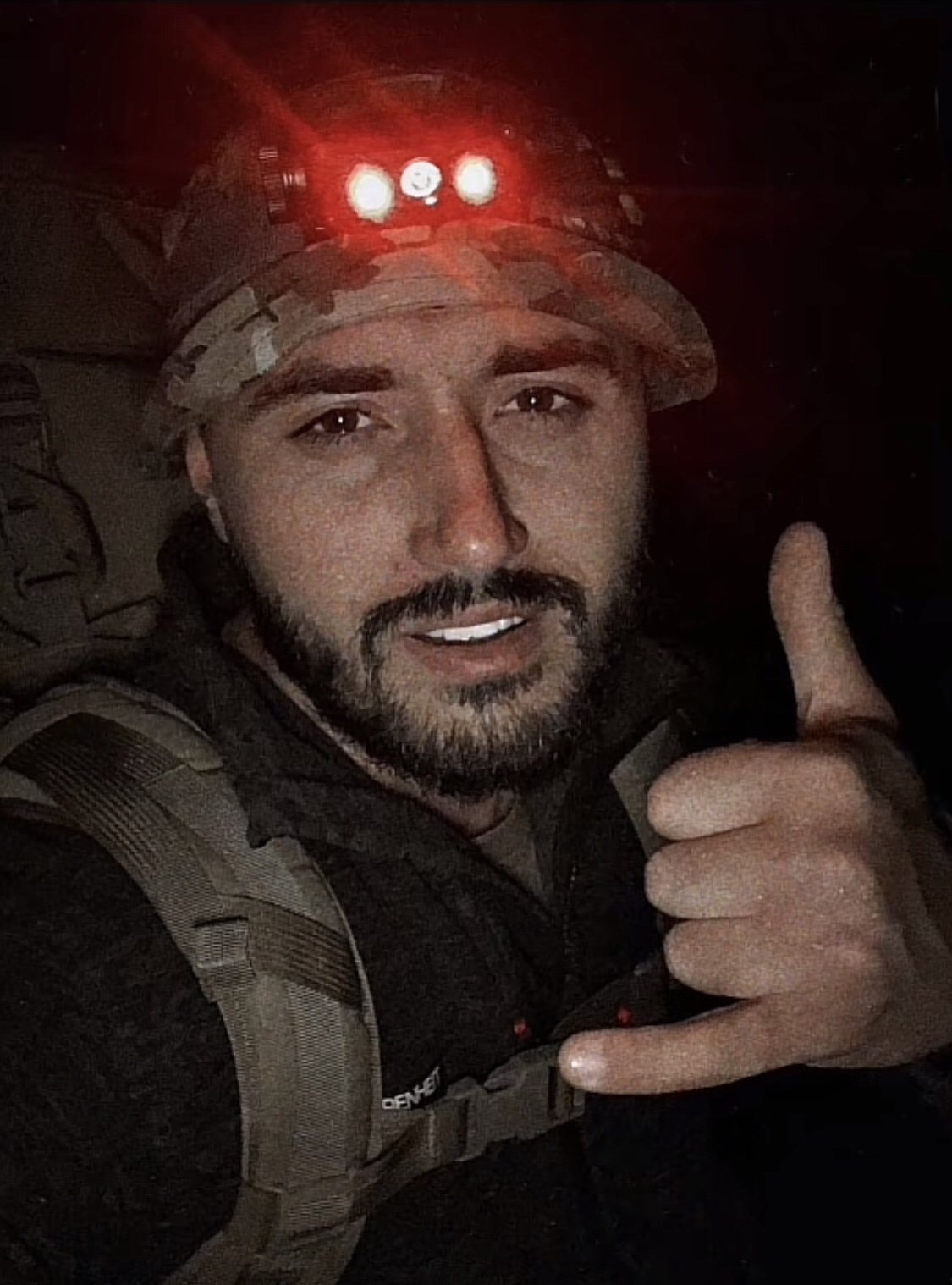

Personal details
- Born: Oleksii Oleksandrovych Chubashev; 16 November 1991 Polohy, Zaporizhzhia Oblast
- Died: 10 June 2022 (aged 30) Sievierodonetsk, Luhansk Oblast
- Education: Ivan Bohun Military High School, Taras Shevchenko National University of Kyiv
- Nickname: Рекрут (Rekrut)

Military service
- Allegiance: Ukraine
- Branch/service: Main Directorate of Intelligence
- Rank: Major
- Battles/wars: Russo-Ukrainian War

Oleksii Oleksandrovych Chubashev (Ukrainian: Олексій Олександрович Чубашев, call sign – Rekrut; 16 November 1991 – 10 June 2022) was a Ukrainian military journalist, serviceman, Major (posthumously) of the Main Directorate of Intelligence, a participant in the Russian-Ukrainian war. From 2019 to 2021, he was the acting head of the Central Television and Radio Studio of the Ministry of Defense of Ukraine (head of Military TV and Army FM radio station).

== Biography ==
Oleksii Chubashev was born on 16 November 1991 in Polohy in Zaporizhzhia Oblast.

In 2010, he graduated from the Ivan Bohun Military High School in Kyiv, and in 2015 from the Military Institute of Taras Shevchenko National University of Kyiv (specializing in journalism).

In 2009, he participated in a military parade on the occasion of the Independence Day of Ukraine.

In 2015, he was deployed to the ATO for the first time, and in the same year he began his service as a military journalist at the Central TV and Radio Studio of the Ministry of Defense of Ukraine. He is the author and host of Ukraine's first military reality show Rekrut.UA. In December 2019, he was appointed acting head of the Central Television and Radio Studio of the Ministry of Defense of Ukraine (head of Military TV and Army FM radio station). On February 28, 2021, he was dismissed from the Armed Forces reserve.

With the beginning of the large-scale Russian invasion of Ukraine in 2022, he performed combat missions as part of a special forces group of the 8th separate Special Forces regiment in the Kyiv region. In April of the same year, he was called up for mobilization, sent to the Defence Intelligence of Ukraine and took up the position of commander of the group of the International Legion of the Main Directorate of Intelligence of the Ministry of Defense of Ukraine.

He died on 10 June 2022 during the defense of the city of Sievierodonetsk. He was buried at the Baikove Cemetery in Kyiv and is survived by his wife, daughter and son.

== Honoring the memory ==
On 24 February 2023, the documentary The Effect of Presence, dedicated to the memory of Oleksii Chubashev, was presented.

On 11 June 2023, a charity race was held in Kyiv in his memory. The event was organized by the public organization Vatra.

== Military ranks ==
- Major (June 28, 2022, posthumously);
- Captain.
