= Heinrich Janzen Manor =

Mansion in Zaporizhzhia Oblast, Ukraine

- Будинок Янцена
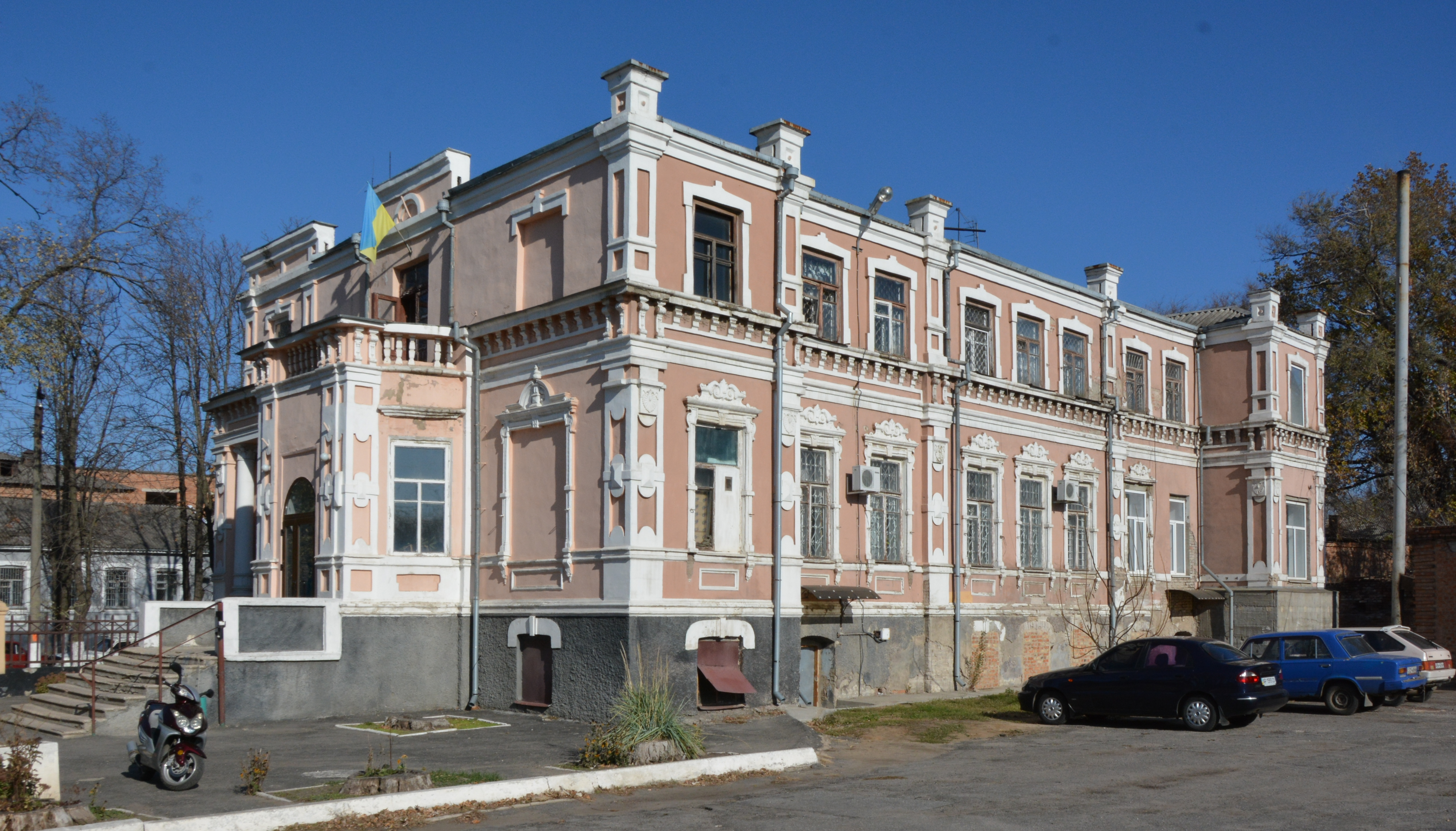

General information
- Location: Orikhiv, Polohy Raion, Zaporizhzhia Oblast, Ukraine, 11 Shevchenko Street
- Owner: Heinrich Janzen

Technical details
- Floor count: 3

The Heinrich Janzen Manor is a 19th century mansion in Orikhiv, Zaporizhzhia Oblast, Ukraine. It currently houses the Orikhiv City Council. The building was damaged by Russian shelling in 2022.

== History ==
Heinrich Janzen was a German Mennonite who moved to Orikhiv. His family built a school, a steam mill and a hospital in the town. Janzen was the first mayor of Orikhiv from 1874 to 1899.

The building was damaged by Russian shelling on May 21, 2022. The walls of the second floor and the roof partially collapsed.

== Gallery ==
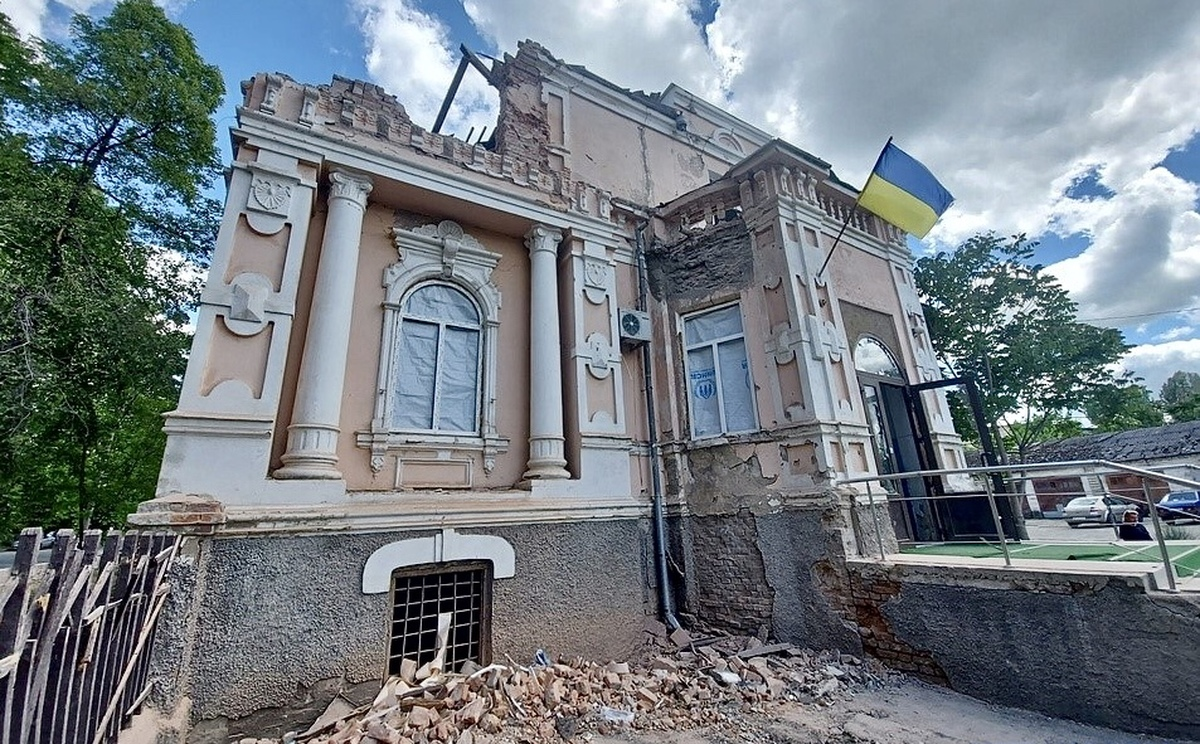
After 2022

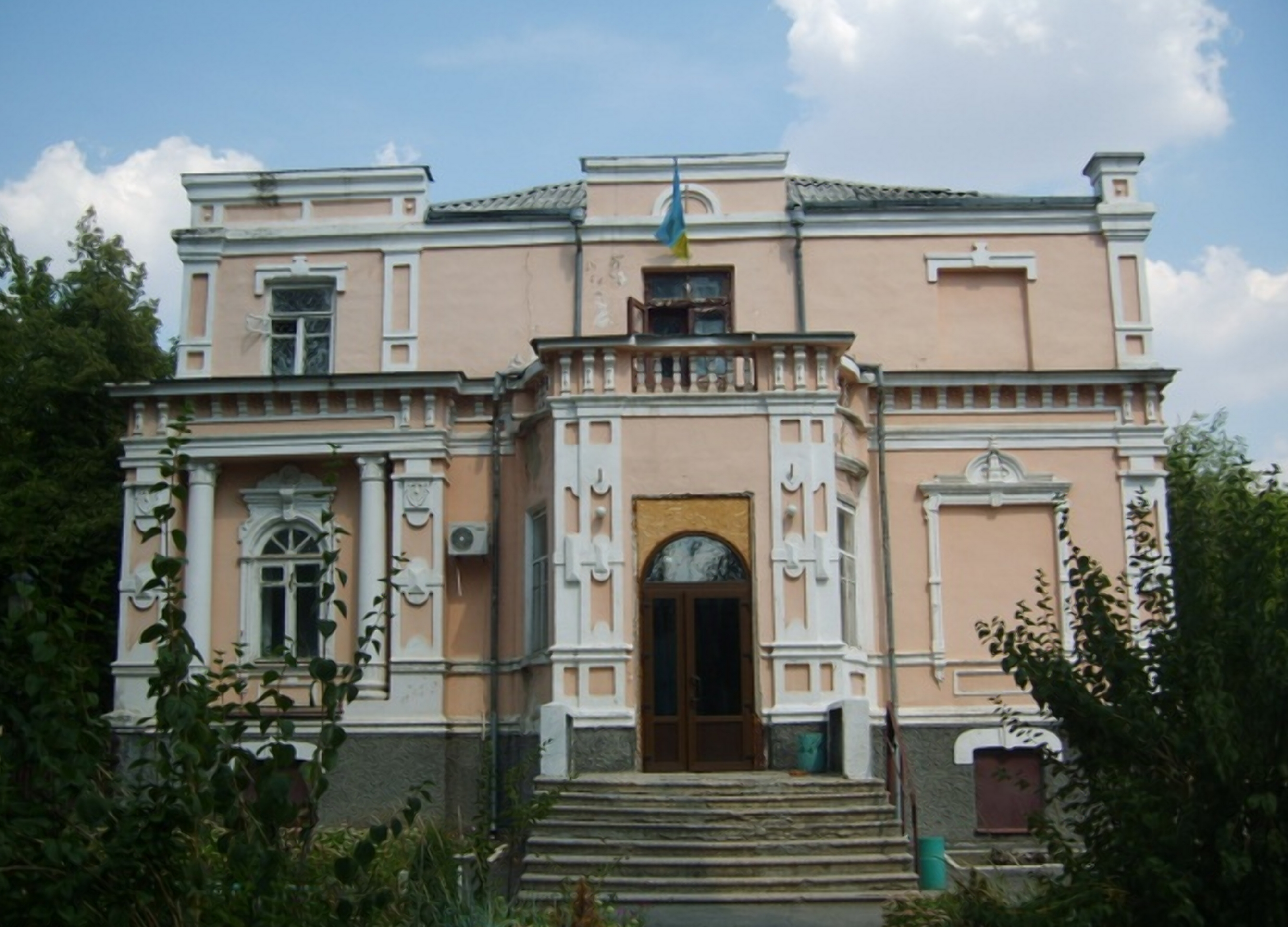

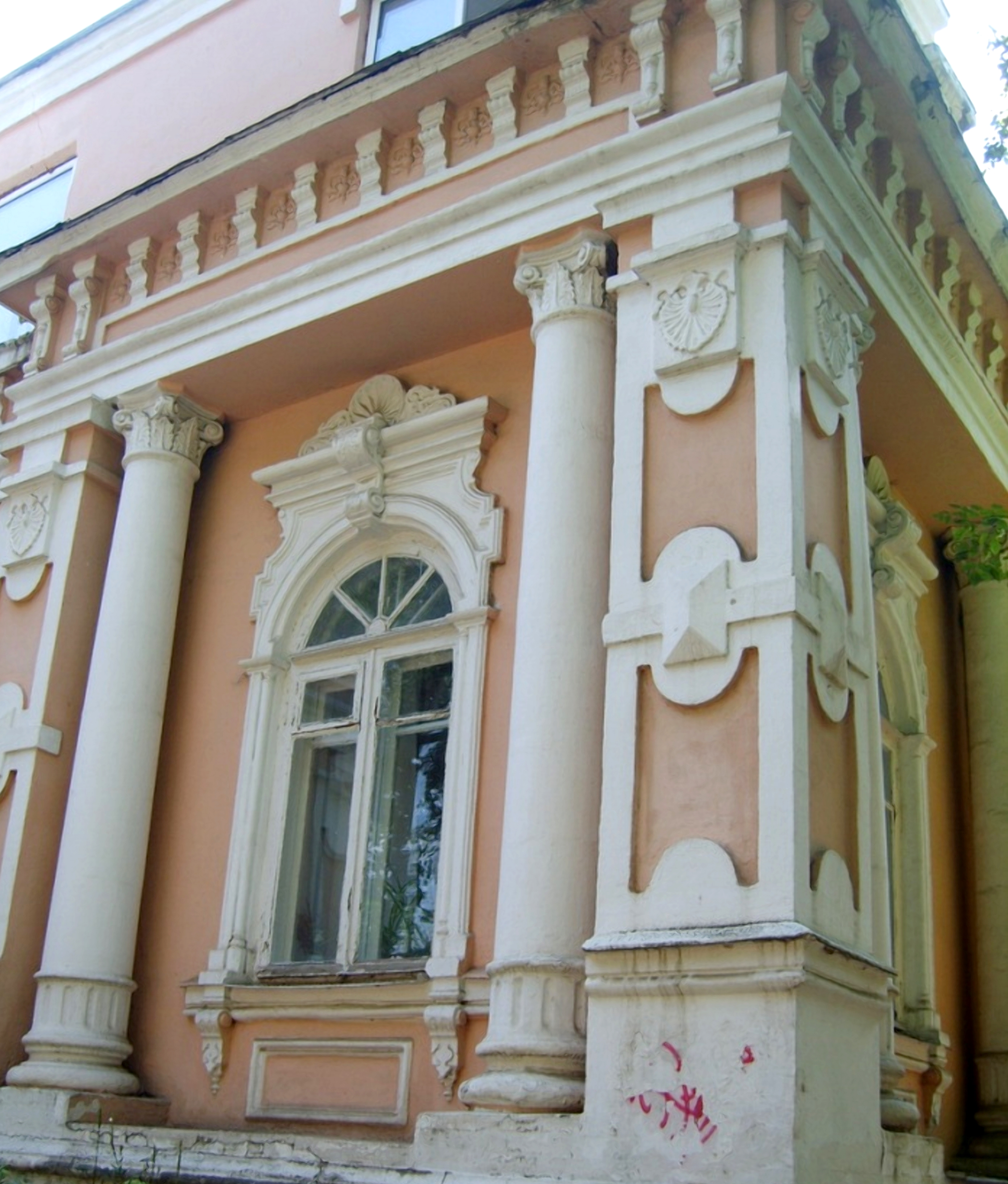

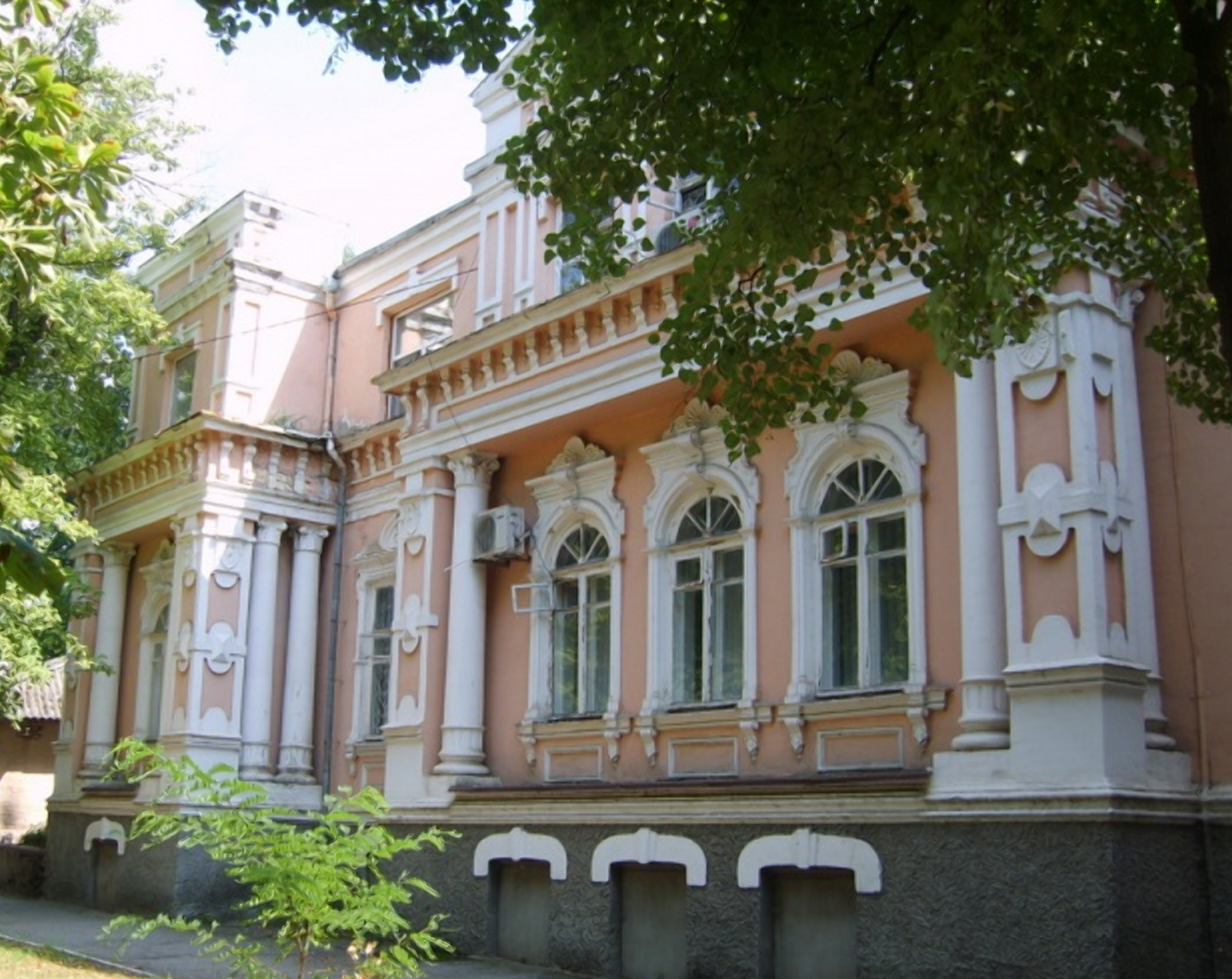
