= Orikhiv urban hromada =

Orikhiv urban hromada Оріхівська міська громада
- Hromada
- Interactive map of Orikhiv urban hromada
- Country: Ukraine
- Oblast: Zaporizhzhia Oblast
- Raion: Polohy Raion

Area
  - Total: 342.8 km^{2} (132.4 sq mi)

Population (2020)
  - Total: 18,493
  - Density: 53.95/km^{2} (139.7/sq mi)
- Settlements: 8
- Cities: 1
- Villages: 7

Orikhiv urban hromada (Ukrainian: Оріхівська міська громада) is a hromada of Ukraine, located in Polohy Raion, Zaporizhzhia Oblast. Its administrative center is the city Orikhiv.

It has an area of 342.8 square kilometres (132.4 mi^{2}) and a population of 18,493, as of 2020.

The hromada contains 8 settlements: 1 city (Orikhiv) and 7 villages:

- Kopani
- Myrne
- Nesterianka
- Novoandriivka
- Novodanylivka
- Novopavlivka
- Shcherbaky

== See also ==
- List of hromadas of Ukraine
