= Novofedorivka, Zaporizhzhia Oblast =

Novofedorivka Новофедорівка
- Village
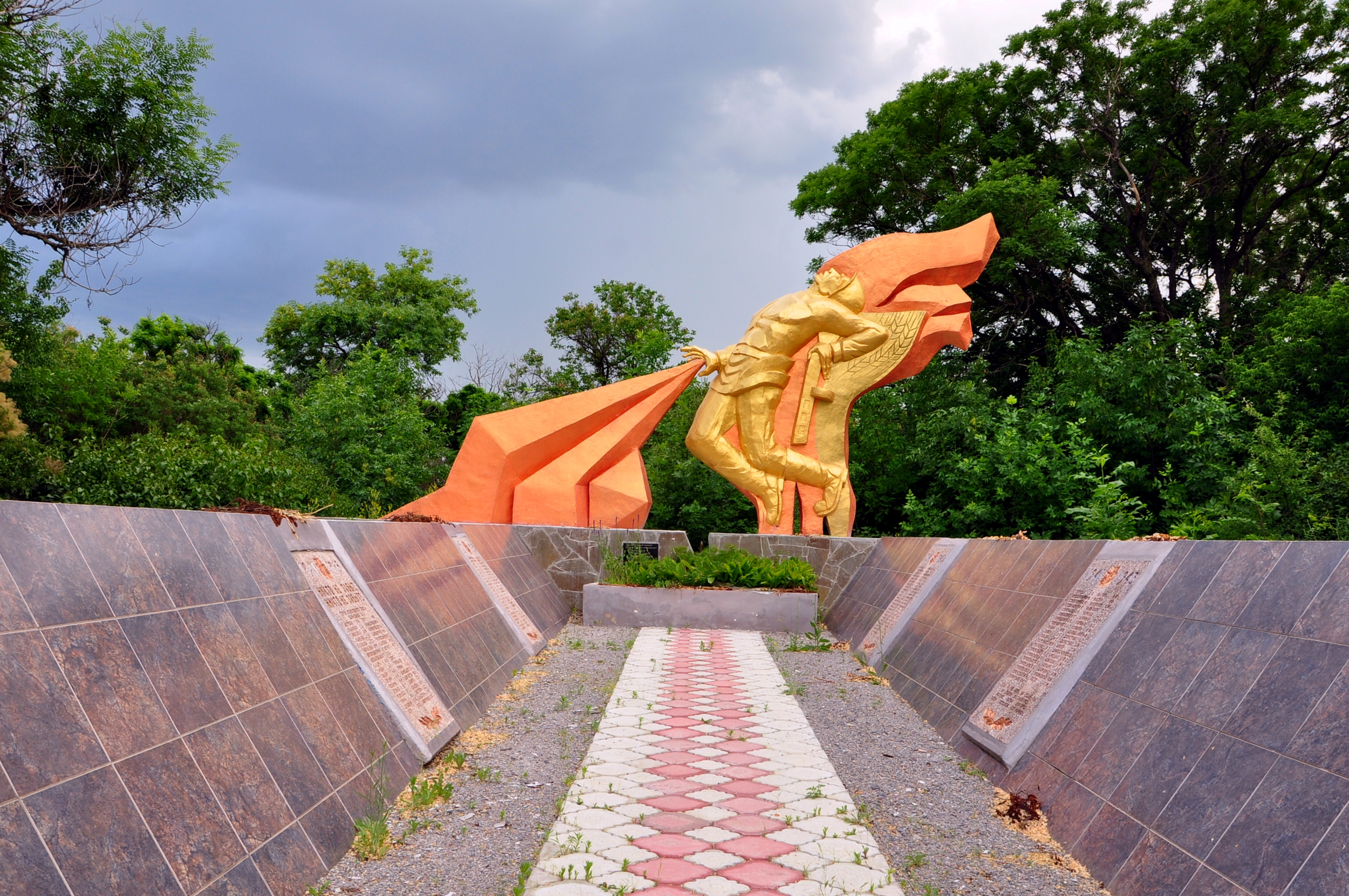
- A memorial for killed Red Army soldiers in Novofedorivka
- Interactive map of Novofedorivka
- Coordinates: 47°28′08″N 36°02′06″E
- Country: Ukraine
- Oblast: Zaporizhia Oblast
- Raion: Polohy Raion
- Hromada: Polohy urban hromada
- Founded: 1880

Population (2001)
  - Total: 447

Novofedorivka (Ukrainian: Новофедорівка) is a village in southern Ukraine, administratively located in Polohy Raion, Zaporizhzhia Oblast. It has a population of 447 as of 2001.

== History ==
It was founded in 1880 as the farm Olhopole (Ukrainian: Ольгополе). In 1918, it was renamed to Ivanivka, and then to its current name of Novofedorivka in 1923.

On 12 June 2020, in accordance with a Verkhovna Rada edict, Novofedorivka became part of Polohy urban hromada.

== Demographics ==
As of the 2001 Ukrainian census the village has 447 residents, 431 (96.42%) of whom are Ukrainians and 15 (3.36%) are Russians.
