= Inzhenerne, Zaporizhzhia Oblast =

Inzhenerne
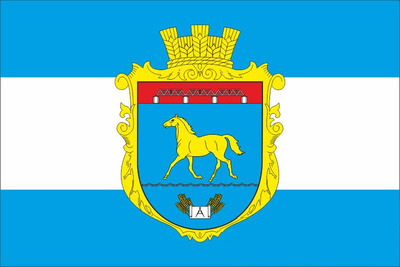
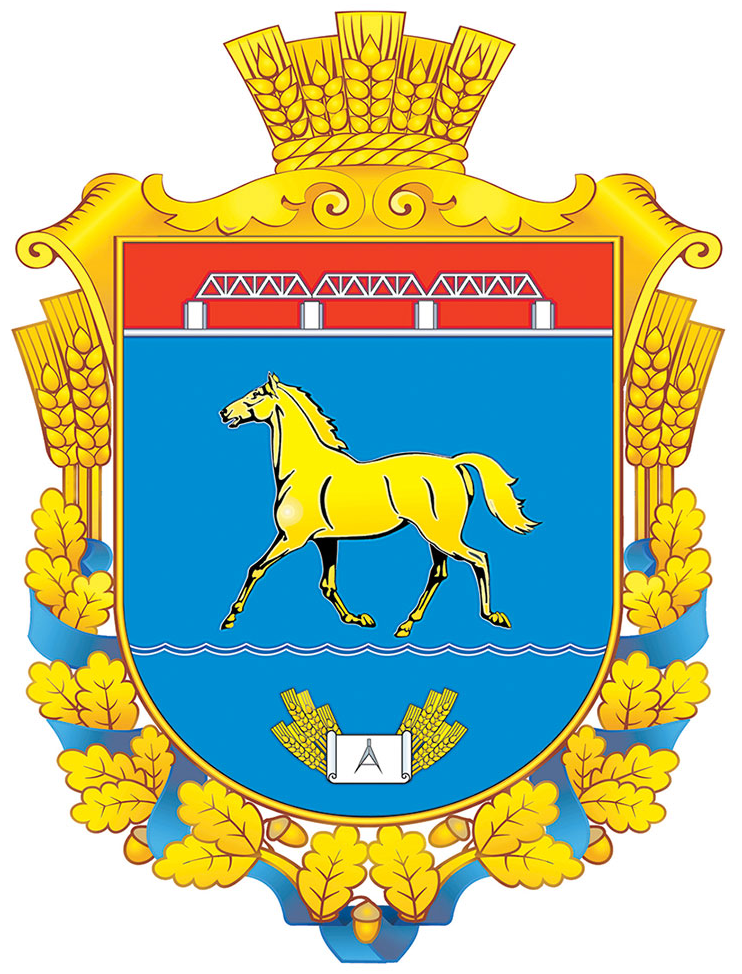
- Flag Coat of arms

- Location of Inzhenerne Inzhenerne (Ukraine)
- Coordinates: 47°29′43″N 36°7′37″E
- Country: Ukraine

Population
  - Total: 1,003

Inzhenerne (Ukrainian: Інженерне) is a village (selo) of Ukraine, in Polohy Raion of Zaporizhzhia Oblast.

== 2022 Russian invasion of Ukraine ==
On 4 April 2022, the Russian army fired on an art school, causing the attic to catch fire. By the time State Emergency Service arrived at the scene, the fire had spread across 40 square meters.
