= Kinska (river) =

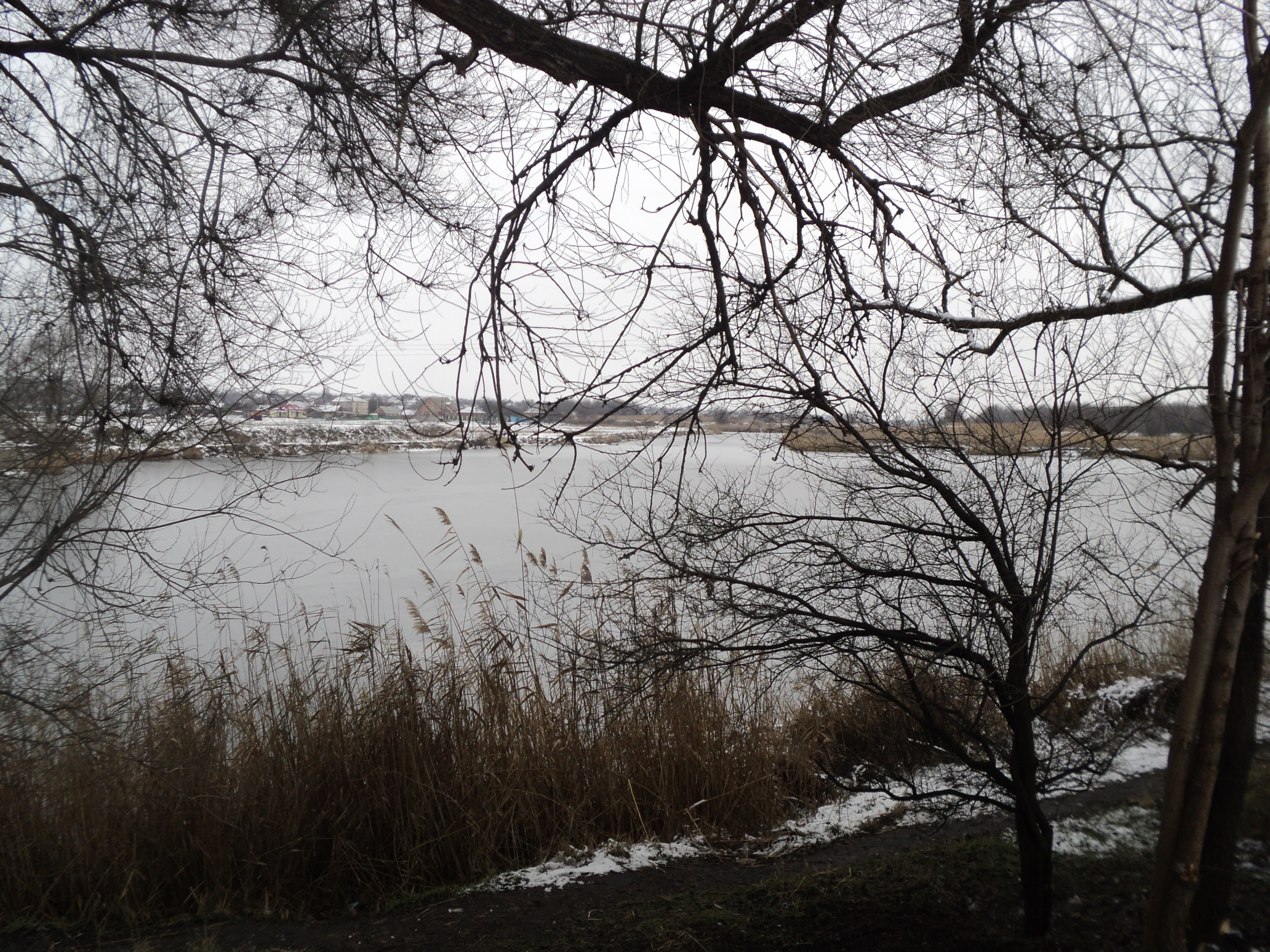

Location
- Country: Ukraine

Physical characteristics
- Source
  - location: Azov Upland
  - coordinates: 47°19′48″N 36°26′46″E
- Mouth: Dnieper
  - coordinates: 47.6388°N 35.2640°E
- Length: 146 km (91 mi)
- Basin size: 2,580 km^{2} (1,000 sq mi)

Basin features
- Progression: Dnieper→ Dnieper–Bug estuary→ Black Sea

The Kinska, also known as the Kinka, Kinski Vody or Konka (Note: Ukrainian: Кінська, Кінка, Кінські Води, Конка; Crimean Tatar: Yilki Su) is a left tributary of the Dnieper, flowing through Zaporizhzhia Oblast, Ukraine. It is 146 km (91 mi) long, and has a drainage basin of 2,580 km^{2} (1,000 sq mi). It originates in the Azov Upland and flows into the Kakhovka Reservoir on the Dnieper. The cities of Polohy and Orikhiv are located on the river.

The name is a calque of the Crimean Tatar name of the river Yilki Su, which means "water of wild horses".

== History ==
A residence of the Mongol military leader Mamai also used to be located at the mouth of the river. In the 18th century it served as a border between the Russian Empire and the Ottoman Empire.

In June 2023, during the Russian invasion of Ukraine, the Kakhovka Dam was blown up, causing the Kinska's water level to drop rapidly.
