= Novopavlivka, Polohy Raion =

Novopavlivka Новопавлівка
- Village
- Interactive map of Novopavlivka
- Location of Novopavlivka in Zaporizhzhia Oblast Novopavlivka (Zaporizhzhia Oblast)
- Coordinates: 47.567665°N 35.784868°E
- Country: Ukraine
- Oblast: Zaporizhzhia Oblast
- Raion: Polohy Raion
- Hromada: Orikhiv urban hromada
- Founded: 1879

Area
  - Total: 3.852 km^{2} (1.487 sq mi)
- Elevation: 41 m (135 ft)

Population (2001 census)
  - Total: 733
  - Density: 190/km^{2} (493/sq mi)
- Time zone: UTC+2 (EET)
  - Summer (DST): UTC+3 (EEST)
- Postal code: 70544
- Area code: +380 6141
- KATOTTH: UA23100170070025759

Novopavlivka (Ukrainian: Новопавлівка; Russian: Новопавловка) is a village in Orikhiv urban hromada, Polohy Raion (district) in Zaporizhzhia Oblast of Ukraine, at about 56.69 kilometres (35.23 mi) south-east (SE) from the centre of Zaporizhzhia city.
