= Polohy =

City in Zaporizhzhia Oblast, Ukraine

Polohy Пологи
- City
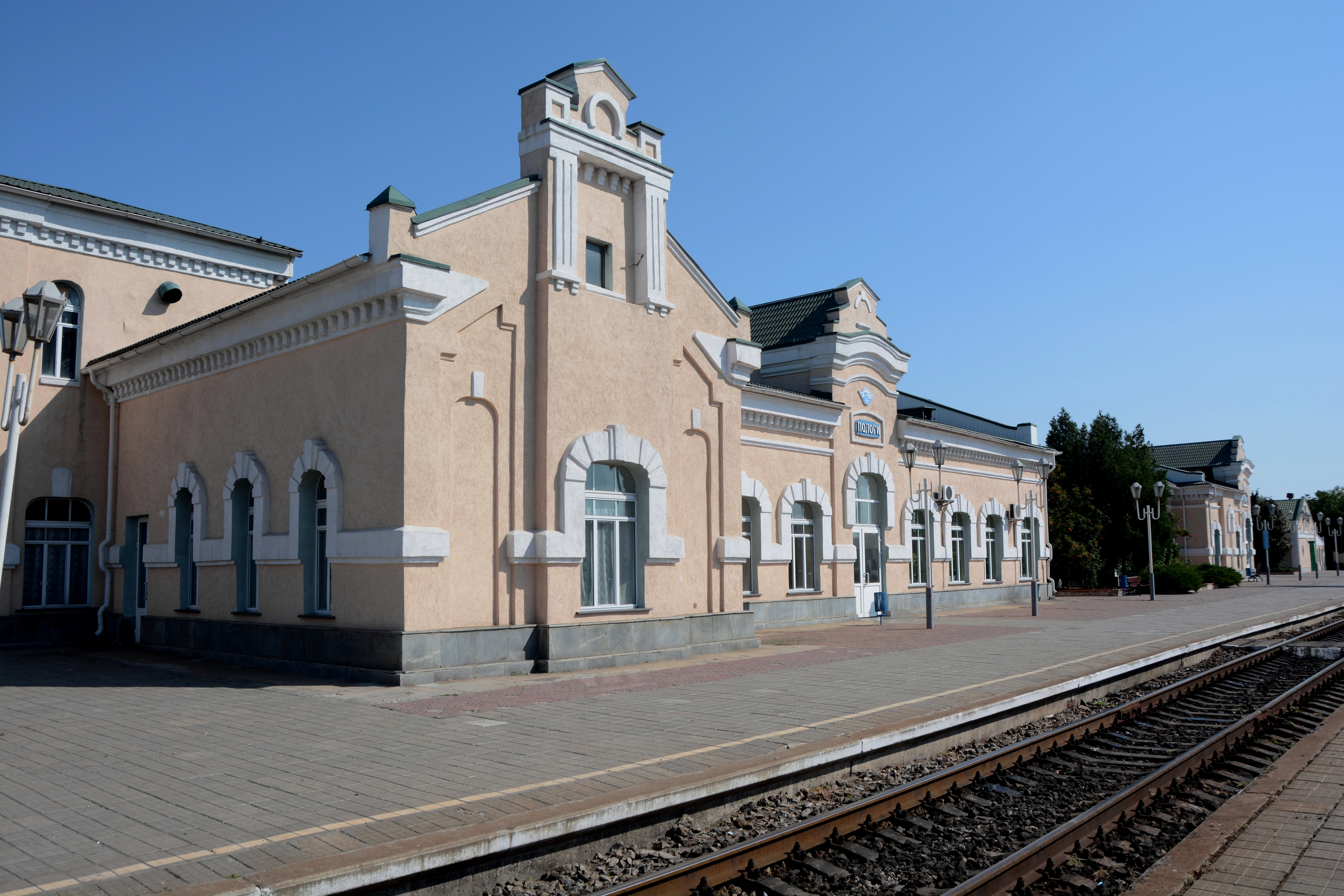
- Polohy railway station

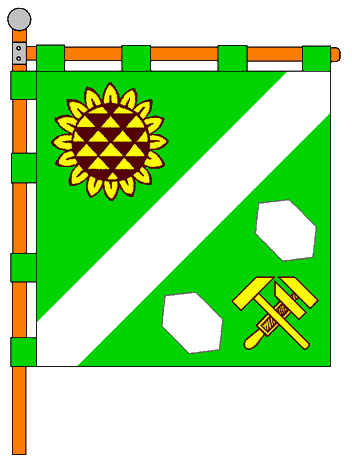
- Flag Coat of arms
- Interactive map of Polohy
- Location within Ukraine Location within Zaporizhzhia Oblast
- Country: Ukraine
- Oblast: Zaporizhzhia Oblast
- Raion: Polohy Raion
- Hromada: Polohy urban hromada
- Founded: 1887

Government
  - Mayor: Yuriy Konovalenko

Population (2022)
  - Total: 18,111
- Climate: Dfa

Polohy (Ukrainian: Пологи, IPA: [poˈlɔɦɪ]; Russian: Пологи, romanized: Pologi) is a city in Zaporizhzhia Oblast, in south-eastern Ukraine. It serves as the administrative center of Polohy urban hromada and Polohy Raion within the oblast. Population: 18,111 (2022 estimate). It is a significant railway junction. Since March 2022, it has been under Russian occupation.

== Geography ==
Polohy is located on the left bank of the Konka river, at the intersection of several railways, making it a significant railway junction. The Polohy railway station is located there.

Across the Konka river is a village, also called Polohy.

== History ==
=== Founding and early history ===
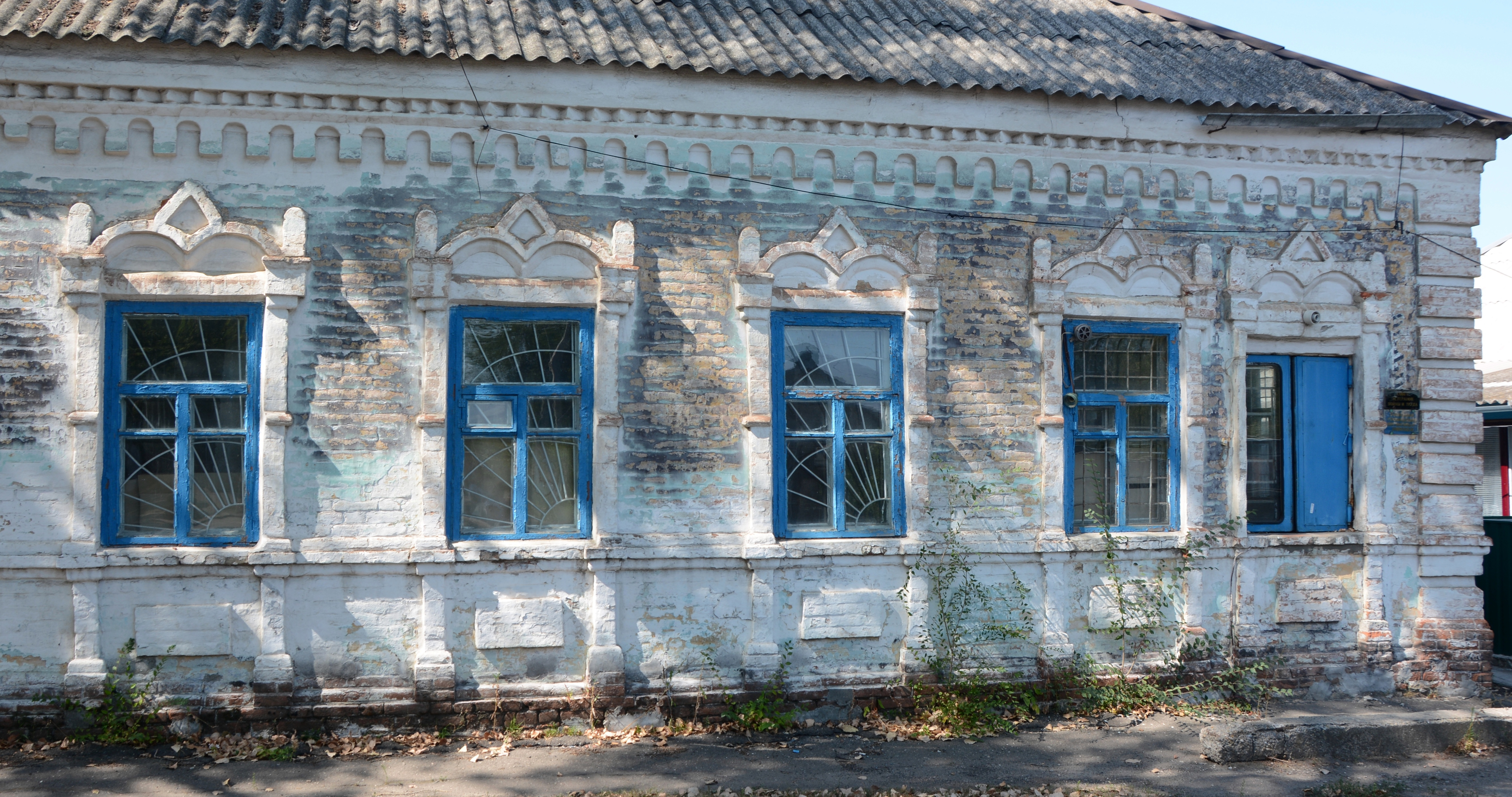
Old victualling house

Polohy was established in 1887 after the construction of a railway that connected Berdiansk with Yekaterinoslav. The city specifically celebrates 17 September as the date of the city's founding.

By 1890, houses for workers had been built in the area. In 1894, the railway station was built, contributing to the growth of the village. By 1904, when a second railway line was built that crossed through the village, Polohy became a railway hub. In 1905, there were "about a hundred thatched huts and dugouts" in the village, and it had a total population of around 700. The population of the village took part in the Russian Revolution of 1905, demonstrating for workers' rights and going on strike.

During the Ukrainian War of Independence, the Bolsheviks took over the village in January 1918. However, in March the same year, Polohy was easily captured by the Central Powers during the 1918 Central Powers invasion of Ukraine, and handed over to the Ukrainian State. Communist partisans were active. It was captured by the anti-communist White Army in late December 1918, before being recaptured by the Red Army on 5 February 1919. Continued fighting took place over Polohy throughout the war, involving Makhnovites, the Army of Wrangel, and South Russia, until an eventual Bolshevik victory in August 1920. Afterwards it was administratively part of the Zaporizhzhia Governorate of Ukraine.

=== In the Soviet Union ===
On 7 October 1923, the All-Ukrainian Central Executive Committee declared the establishment of Polohy Raion inside Berdiansk Okruha of Yekaterinoslav Governorate, with its administrative center in Polohy. Polohy received the status of urban-type settlement in October 1928. From 1928 to 1937, Polohy carried the name of Chubarivka, after the Soviet politician Vlas Chubar. Polohy received city status in 1938.

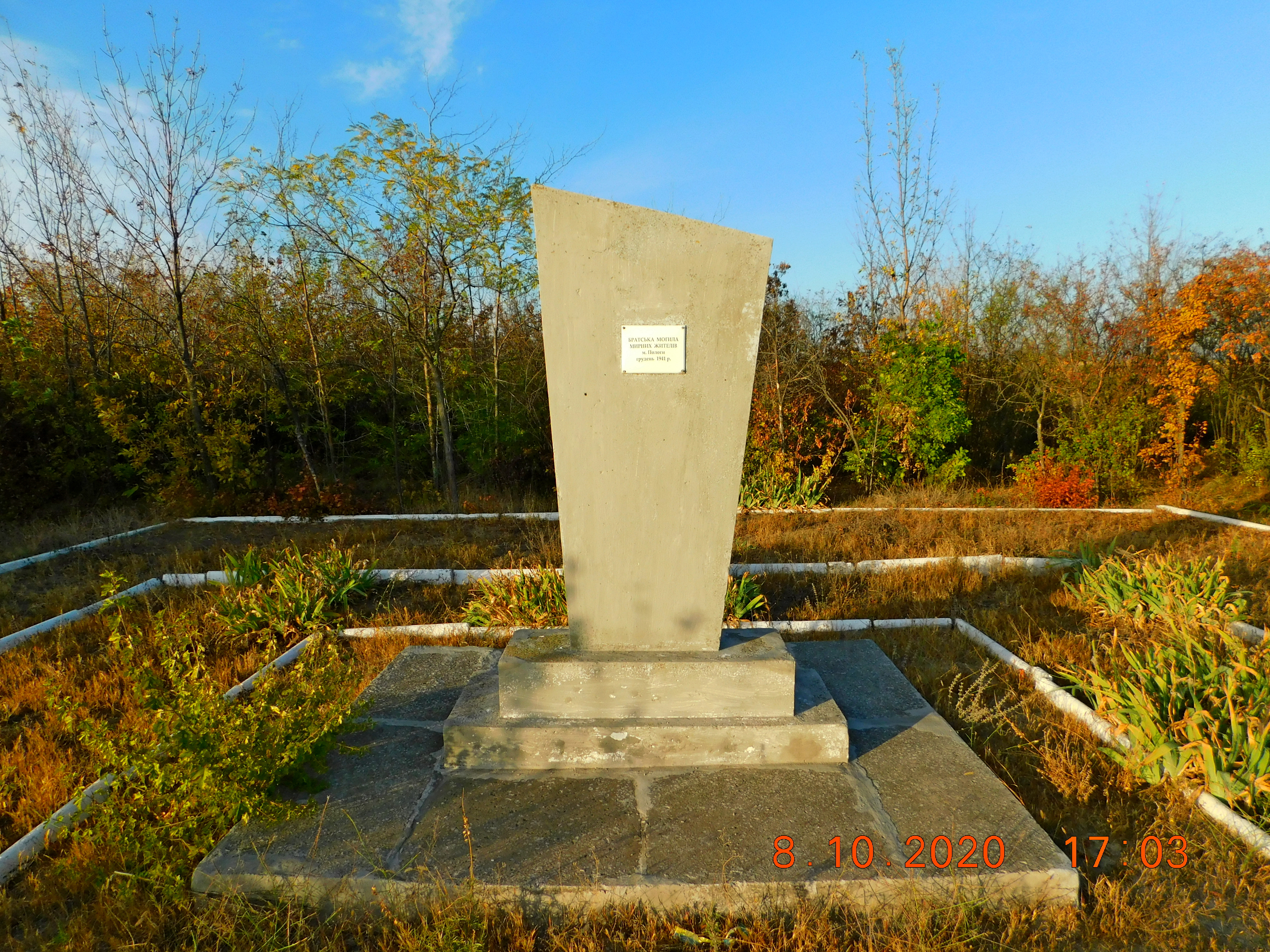
The mass grave of victims of the Nazis in Polohy

During World War II, Polohy was occupied by Nazi Germany beginning 5 October 1941. Oppressions against the local Jewish population - who had comprised 3.2% of the population prewar - began immediately. In December 1941, a large number of Jews - either 70 families or 100 Jews, according to different reports - were murdered at Polohy as part of the Holocaust. There are some reports of subsequent mass killings of Jews and non-Jews at the same site over the following months. Polohy was liberated by the Red Army on 17 September 1943.

A cannery was opened in Polohy in 1967, which processed agricultural products.

=== In independent Ukraine ===
Polohy urban hromada, a hromada (low-level administrative division) of Ukraine with its center in Polohy, was formed on 30 March 2018 from the union of several local councils.

==== Russian invasion of Ukraine ====
On 3 March 2022, Polohy was captured by Russian forces during the Russian invasion of Ukraine. The city was shelled with Grad rockets and other weapons, heavily damaging many houses. Locals have accused Russian forces of deliberately destroying the city's critical infrastructure. Eyewitness reports from the city have also detailed accounts of Russian soldiers murdering civilians, sacking, abducting local activists, and torturing people in the city. Water and electricity infrastructure has stopped working, as well as internet access and cellular communication. Food insecurity has become a problem for residents. While exact population estimates are uncertain, the Ukraine Crisis Media Center said that it was certain at least half of the pre-invasion population had fled by May 2022.

Russian forces heavily fortified areas near the city in anticipation of the 2023 Ukrainian counteroffensive. In May 2023, reports from ordinary residents of Polohy as well as the exiled mayor Yuriy Konovalenko said that Russia was forcibly removing civilians from the city to be transferred to Berdiansk, deeper within Russia-controlled territory. In July 2023, a three-man Ukrainian drone team used an explosive-carrying drone to blow up a Russian electronic warfare system mounted on a tower in Polohy.

On 8–10 September 2023, the 2023 Russian elections took place in the occupied Ukrainian territories, which Melitopol mayor Ivan Fedorov described as "hellish pseudo-elections". During this period, on 9 September, Fedorov reported that the headquarters of United Russia - the Russian ruling party - in Polohy had been blown up. Fedorov alluded to casualties among the occupation authorities, stating on Telegram that "Some went to the hospital, and some went straight to the morgue".

== Culture ==
Polohy has become known in recent years for its ceramics, with Yurii Konovalenko, the head of the Polohy City Military Administration, describing the city as the "capital of ceramics" in Zaporizhzhia Oblast. The best-known brand is "Good Clay" (Ukrainian: Добра глина), which traces its origins to a workshop in the city from the pre-World War II era. After it ceased operations due to the war, the workshop was revived again in 1997. Its products are made from white clay found in Polohy. The founder of the revived workshop was Viktor Nahurnyi, who moved the workshop from Polohy to Zaporizhzhia in 2022, after exhibitions were held in the city.

== Demographics ==
Distribution of ethnic groups according to the 2001 Ukrainian census:

Ethnic groups in Polohy
	percent
Ukrainians	91.25%
Russians	7.23%
Belarusians	0.28%
Azerbaijani	0.23%
Armenians	0.20%
Bulgarians	0.18%
Germans	0.14%

== Notable people ==
- Oleksii Chubashev (1991–2022), Ukrainian soldier
- Volodymyr Kozak (born 1959), Ukrainian politician
- Viktor Poltavets (1925–2003), Soviet and Ukrainian artist
- Vitaliy Satskyi (1930–2017), Ukrainian politician
- Polina Zhemchuzhina (1897–1970), Soviet politician
