= Army FM =

Army FM Армія FM
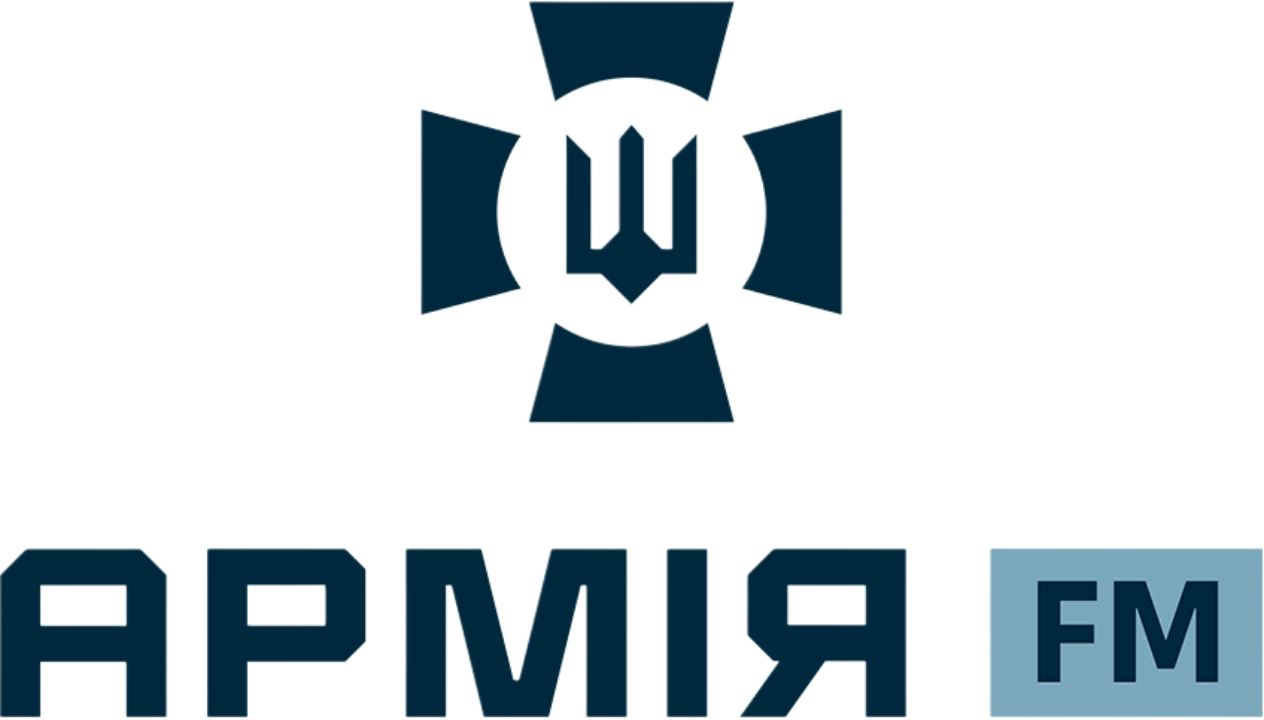
- Kyiv; Ukraine
- Broadcast area: Ukraine including Russian-occupied regions

Programming
- Languages: Ukrainian, Russian

Ownership
- Owner: Ministry of Defence (Ukraine)

History
- First air date: March 1, 2016

Links
- Website: www.armyfm.com.ua

Army FM (Ukrainian: Армія FM) is a Ukrainian radio station owned and operated by the Ministry of Defence. Army FM was sponsored by the American nonprofit, Spirit of America, and started broadcasting on March 1, 2016, in test mode. The station broadcasts news and music in the Ukrainian and Russian languages. It broadcasts online, via satellite and in some cities via FM. Its main aim is to counter pro-Russian propaganda in the Donbas. The signal is broadcast in the Russian occupied eastern regions by a network of 28 transmitters.

The studios and editorial office is located in the former headquarters of the Red Army in Kyiv.

== History ==
At first, Army FM broadcast exclusively on the Internet. Soon, it began satellite broadcasting and began broadcasting its programs on the radio in a number of cities in the Donetsk region.

The format of the radio station was formed quite quickly: news and reports of the General Staff, as well as information, educational, musical and entertainment programs.

In 2017, the National Council issued 11 temporary broadcasting permits in the Donetsk and Luhansk regions. During the same period, Army FM received broadcasting licenses in Kostiantynivka, Pokrovsk, Kreminna and Starobilsk.

In the autumn of 2018, the radio station began broadcasting from a 190-meter tower in Hirnyk. In parallel, Army FM received broadcasting licenses in Shyrokyi and Chonhar.

Every month, journalists of Army FM went to a brigade and introduced their audience to its military. They also conducted broadcasts with residents of de-occupied villages.

Convinced that the task of covering the front line in Donbas was fulfilled, the National Council decided to provide an opportunity for further development of the station. The result was that in spring of 2019, Army FM began broadcasting in Kyiv, Zhytomyr and Vinnytsia. In the same year, the radio station received broadcasting licenses in Berdichev, Zvyagel, Zaporizhzhia, Lviv, Yavoriv, Novoyavorivsk, Mykolaiv, Poltava and Kherson.

Until the full-scale invasion of 2022, Army FM was relayed on the local radio station "Kryvbas" in the city of Kryvyi Rih.

== Programming ==
The target audience is Ukrainian soldiers in the occupied zone. Information is provided about the activities of the Ukrainian army, discussion of the needs of the military in the occupied zone, congratulations to Ukrainian soldiers from peaceful territories of Ukraine, news, legal advice to the military, extraordinary stories about fighters and their commanders, music (Ukrainian and foreign), with Ukrainian music accounting for more than half of the airtime.

At 06:00 and 22:00 the National Anthem of Ukraine plays.

Army FM's staff is composed of professional military and journalists who graduated from the Military Institute of Taras Shevchenko National University of Kyiv.
