= Raduga =

Raduga (Russian: Радуга, lit. 'rainbow') can refer to:

- MKB Raduga, a Russian maker of missile systems formerly known as OKB Raduga
- VBK-Raduga, an uncrewed reentry capsule used to return material from the Russian Mir space station
- Raduga (satellite), a series of Russian communications satellites
- Raduga (Christian publishers), a publishing house of the Russian Empire
- Raduga Publishers, a publishing house of the Soviet Union
- Rainbow (1944 film), Russian: «Радуга», romanized: Raduga, a 1944 film directed by Mark Donskoy
- Raduga (radio), a Russian-language music radio station in Lithuania
- Raduga (nuclear test) a Soviet nuclear test
