= Molochansk Milk Canning Factory =

Milk canning factory in Molochansk

- Native name: Молочанський молочноконсервний комбінат
- Type: Public
- Industry: Dairy
- Founded: 1950, Molochansk, Zaporizhzhia Oblast, Ukraine

The Molochansk Milk Canning Factory is a dairy enterprise in Molochansk, Ukraine on Luhova Street, 83.

== History ==
The factory was opened in 1950, and by the early 1970s was producing milk, cream, butter, sour cream, baby milk, and powdered milk being supplied all over the USSR.

The factory was transferred to the authority of the Ukrainian State Agricultural Industrial Committee in November 1989.

The factory was transferred to the municipal ownership of the Zaporizhzhia Oblast in October 1992.

The factory was declared bankrupt on February 25, 2010 by the Zaporizhzhia Oblast Commercial Court following the 2008 financial crisis.
