= Molochansk =

City in Zaporizhzhia Oblast, Ukraine

Molochansk Молочанськ
- City
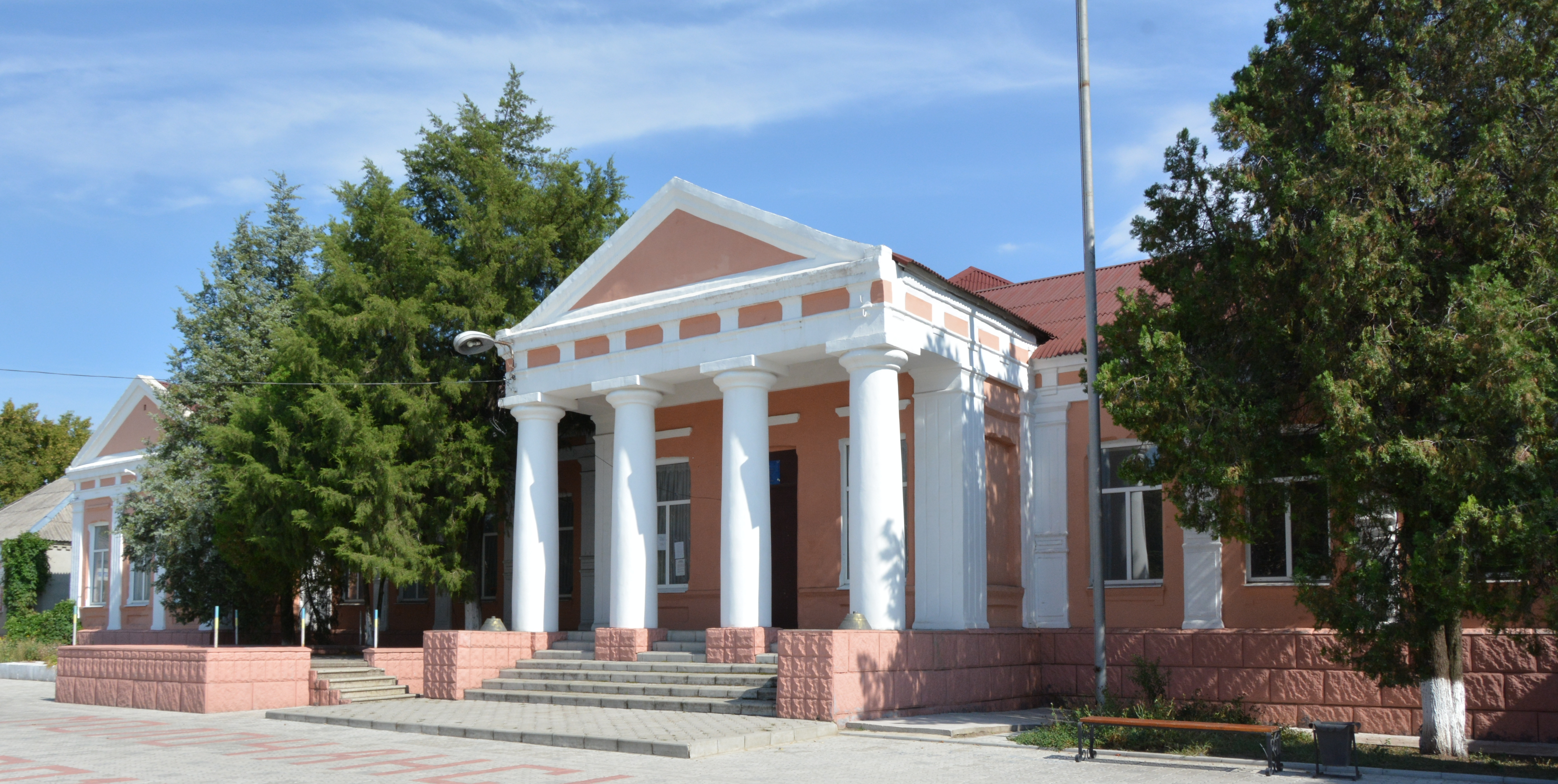
- Centralschule (Boys' School)

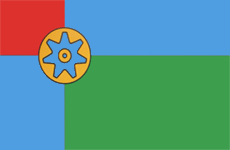
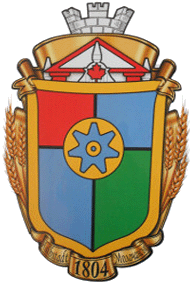
- Flag Coat of arms
- Interactive map of Molochansk
- Location within Zaporizhzhia Oblast Location within Ukraine
- Coordinates: 47°12′26″N 35°35′41″E
- Country: Ukraine
- Oblast: Zaporizhzhia Oblast
- Raion: Polohy Raion
- Hromada: Molochansk urban hromada
- Founded: 1804

Government
  - Mayor: Iryna Volodymyrivna Lypka

Area
  - Total: 8.5 km^{2} (3.3 sq mi)
- Elevation: 32 m (105 ft)

Population (2022)
  - Total: 6,099
  - Density: 720/km^{2} (1,900/sq mi)
- Postal code: 71716, 71717
- Climate: Dfa

Molochansk (Ukrainian: Молочанськ, IPA: [moloˈtʃɑnʲsʲk]; Russian: Молочанск; German: Molotschansk, formerly Halbstadt) is a city in Polohy Raion, Zaporizhzhia Oblast, Ukraine. The Molochna River flows through the city. Population: 6,099 (2022 estimate).

Molochansk was occupied by the southern front of the Russian invasion of Ukraine in late February 2022.

== History ==
=== Ancient and founding period ===
The area of the present village had been inhabited by nomadic tribes since ancient times. 42 burial mounds have been discovered around Molochansk, with 434 burials of the Bronze Age, Scythians, Sarmatians, and the Pechenegs. The area was controlled by the Crimean Khanate until the Late 18th Century.

Under the Russian Empire

Molochansk was founded in 1804 by Plautdietsch-speaking Mennonite settlers who were invited by Empress Catherine the Great to settle on the vast western steppes of the Tsar's Russian Empire, becoming part of the Volga Germans. They called the new village "Halbstadt". Mennonites had earlier, in 1789, founded the Chortitza Colony at the invitation of Catherine the Great. It was the successful founding of Chortitza that encouraged expansion into the Molochna River region. By 1850, there were over 50 Mennonite villages south and east of Molochansk/Halbstadt. Halbstadt was the centre of the Molotschna Colony.

During the Early 19th Century, the towns economy was predominantly agricultural, specifically Sheep farming, but also Horticulture and Sericulture. A brewery and vinegar factory were built in the town in 1832 by Neudels, and later a distillery, and cloth and silk factories. The merchants Franz and Schröder founded a factory in the 1860s that produces mowers, seeders, plows and brick ant tile presses. The factory later became an iron foundry employing 200 workers. A starch factory was opened in 1880 by Williams, which produced Dextrin and rice powder. The factory had 400 workers in the 1880s.

The village of Neu-Halbstadt separated from Halbstadt in the Early 1880s, around the same time of the first emigration of Mennonites to Canada. Markets were held in the town on Wednesdays and Sundays from 1882, where agricultural products were sold. A Zemstvo hospital opened in the Early 1880s, housing 40 beds and serving 31 settlements in the area.

The Christian publisher, Raduga was founded in the town in 1887, chaired by Ivan Prokhanov. The publisher closed during the revolution.

Gospel publishing house "Raduga" (Rainbow) in the German Mennonite colony of Halbstadt (now Molochansk).

200 workers of the iron foundry at the Franz and Schröder plant struck from March 12, 1905. A metalworkers union was founded at the factory with the help of the Social Democratic Group, headed by Bolshevik V. G. Pisklov.

A railway line was built through Halbstadt in 1913. The town was renamed to Molochansk in 1915 due to the outbreak of World War I.

=== Under the Soviet Union ===
Because of hostile national policies toward Mennonites in the 20th century Soviet Union, almost no Mennonites are left in the region. During Soviet rule, a large number of people lost all their possessions, left the country, or were forcibly relocated to remote parts of Kazakhstan.

The Southern State Factory Stables were formed in the 1920s within former stables and farms of the 19th Century.

The town became a city in 1938. The city was renamed back to Halbstadt in August 1941, when the city was occupied by the Nazis and was the centre of the Halbstadt district as part of the Reichskommissariat Ukraine. The city was liberated from the Nazis on September 21, 1943 during the Donbas strategic offensive.

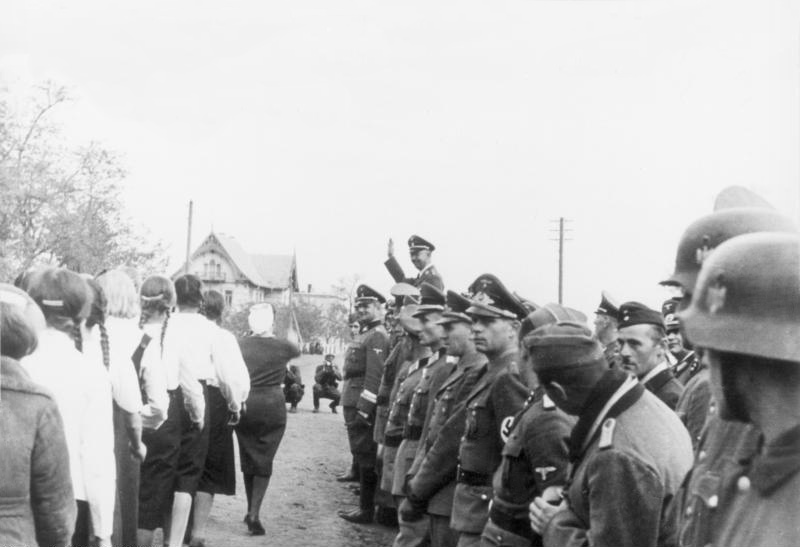
Ethnic German youths marching past Heinrich Himmler, September 1942.

Following the end of the Second World War, the city saw significant industrial development. In 1973, the Molochansk Milk Canning Factory was opened, along with a furniture factory, a grenade factory, a brewery, a foundry, a fruit nursery, and a mechanical shop of the Tokmak Metal Products Factory.

=== In independent Ukraine ===
In 2004, the 200th anniversary of Molochansk/Halbstadt was celebrated with worldwide distinguished guests in attendance. Canada's ambassador to Ukraine was present at the gala event.

The monument to Vladimir Lenin was destroyed on March 17, 2015. More decommunization occurred in 2016, when 18 streets in the city were renamed.

The city has been part of the Polohy Raion since July 19, 2020, following the abolition of the Tokmak Raion.

The city has been occupied by Russia since February 27, 2022.

On August 18, 2026, The Ukrainian Defense Force struck a road bridge over the Molochna River near the city that was used by Russia to support military logistics.

== Demographics ==
=== Historical population data ===
The population of the town in the 1860s was 76 households of 532 people. Until 1914, the population in settlement exceeded 1,000 people. The city's population increased in the coming years, reaching 10,771 in 1959, until it started to decline again to 10,082 in 1979, 9,096 in 1989, 7,964 in 2001 and 6,327 in 2020.

=== Recent population data ===
As of the Ukrainian national census in 2001, Molochansk had a population of 7,964 inhabitants. Ethnic Ukrainians constitute a large majority, followed by a big minority of Russian descendants. Other notable minorities include Black Sea Germans, Belarusians, and Taurida Bulgarians. In terms of spoken languages, the Ukrainian language is mostly spoken, yet native speakers of the Russian language account for over 40%, due it being commonly spoken among other ethnic groups.

Distribution of the population by their ethnicity according to the 2001 Ukrainian census:

Ethnic groups in Molochansk
	percent
Ukrainians	76.34%
Russians	21.17%
Belarusians	0.93%
Bulgarians	0.38%
Germans	0.30%
Tatars	0.13%

Distribution of the population by their primary language according to the 2001 Ukrainian census:

Native languages in Molochansk
	percent
Ukrainian	57.4%
Russian	42.3%
Belarusian	0.1%
Bulgarian	0.1%
others	0.1%

== Transport ==
The P85 highway runs through the city. The city has a railway station (Molochansk railway station).

== Attractions ==
Schroeder's Palace, built Late 19th Century.

== Famous people ==
- Vitaliy Vozianov (born 1935), Director of Ukrinform between 1994 and 1997
- Vladyslav Holota (1934-2026), Ukrainian scientist
- Dmytro Sakharuk, Ukrainian manager and executive director of DTEK)
- Volodymyr Karpov (1911-1987), Ukrainian engineer and deputy of the Verkhovna Rada of Russian ancestry
- Leonid Herasymyuk , Ukrainian militant, who served in the Ukrainian Insurgent Army, Ukrainian Volunteer Army, and the Organisation of Ukrainian Nationalists
- William Neufeld (1901-1992), US-American Javelin thrower of German ethnicity
- Helmut Oberlander (1924-2021), German soldier, who served in the SS
- Ingrid Rimland (1936-2017), US-American novelist of German ethnicity

== Gallery ==
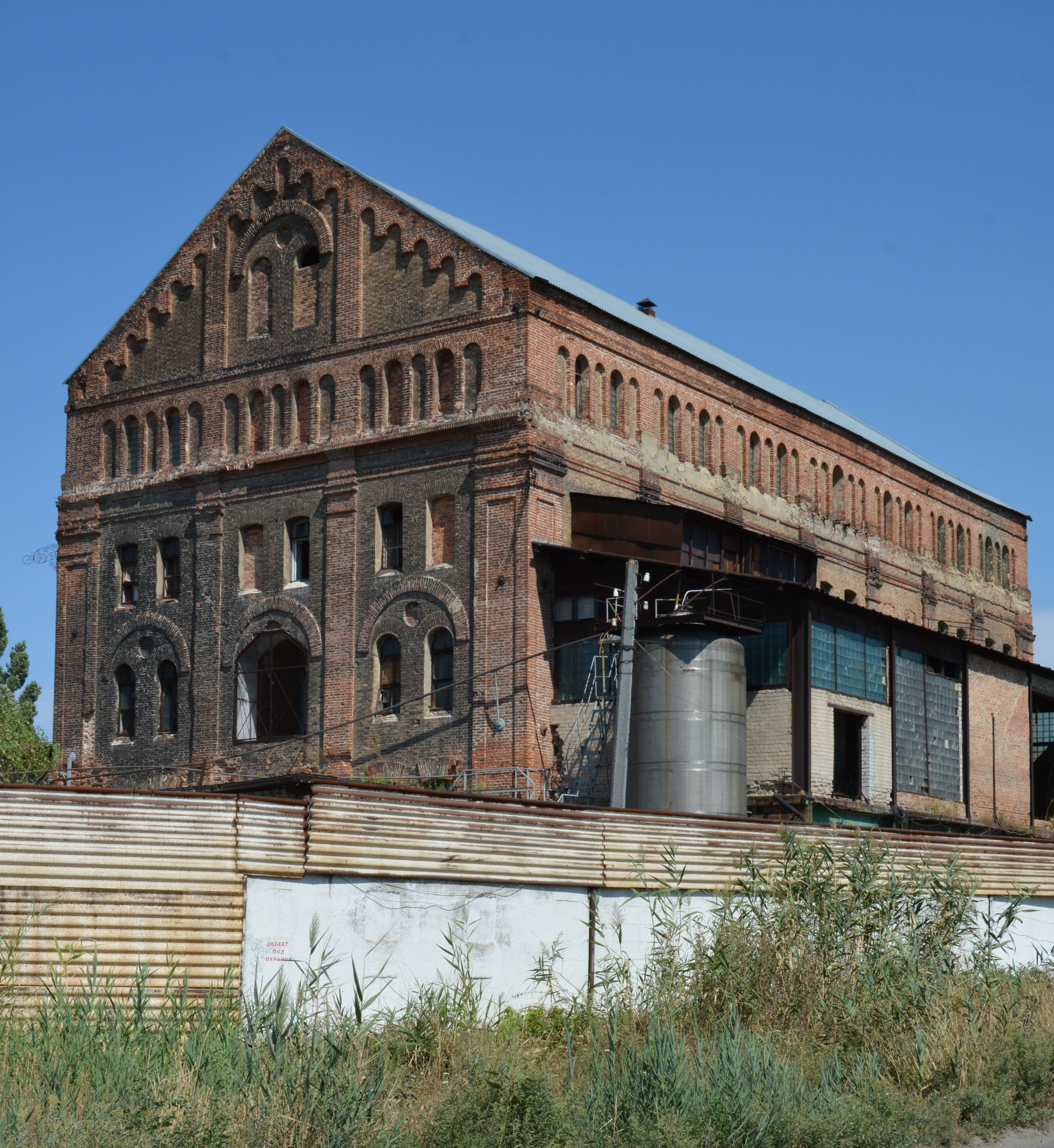
Heinrich H Willms Mill

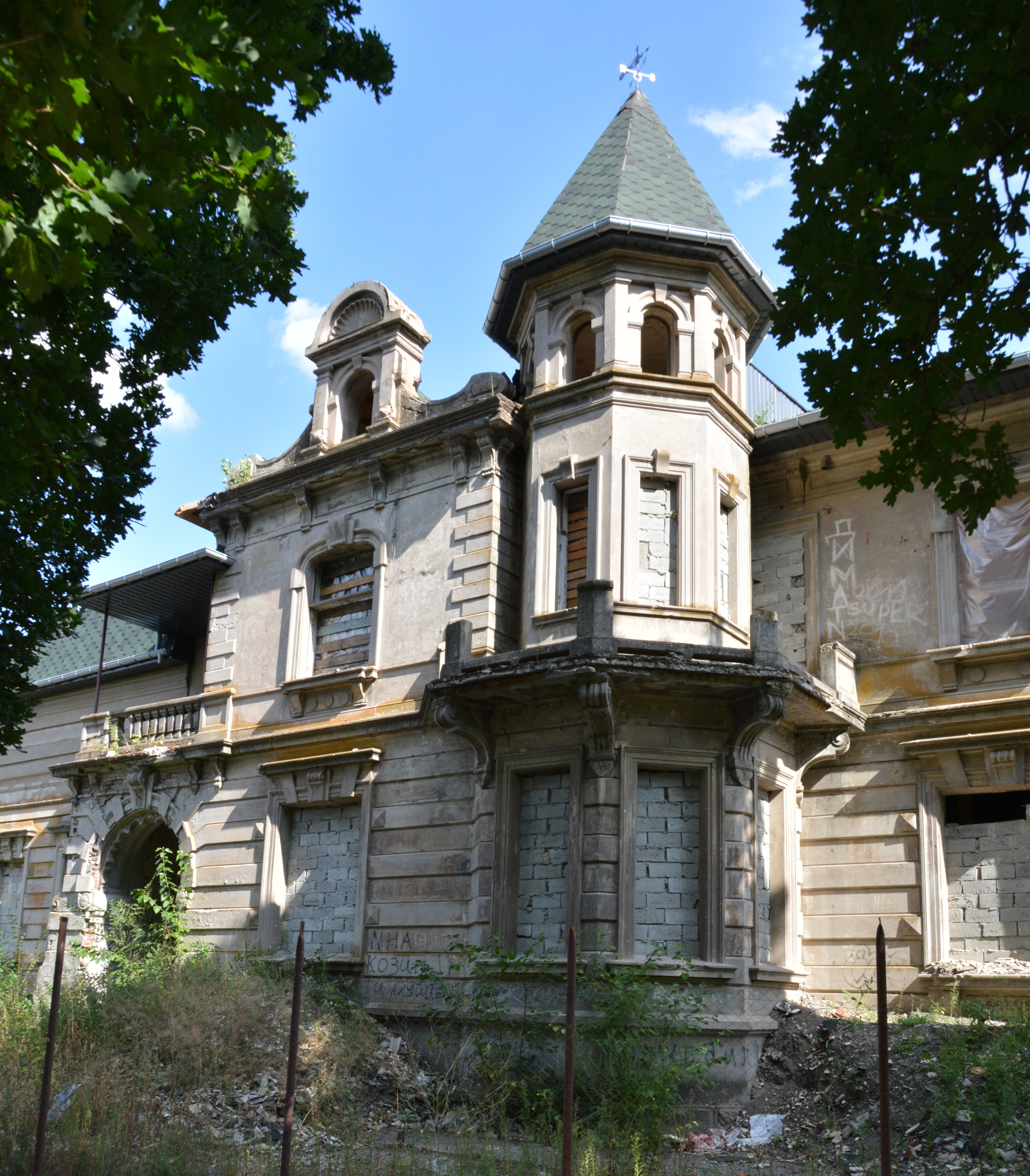
Heinrich H Willms Residence in Molochansk

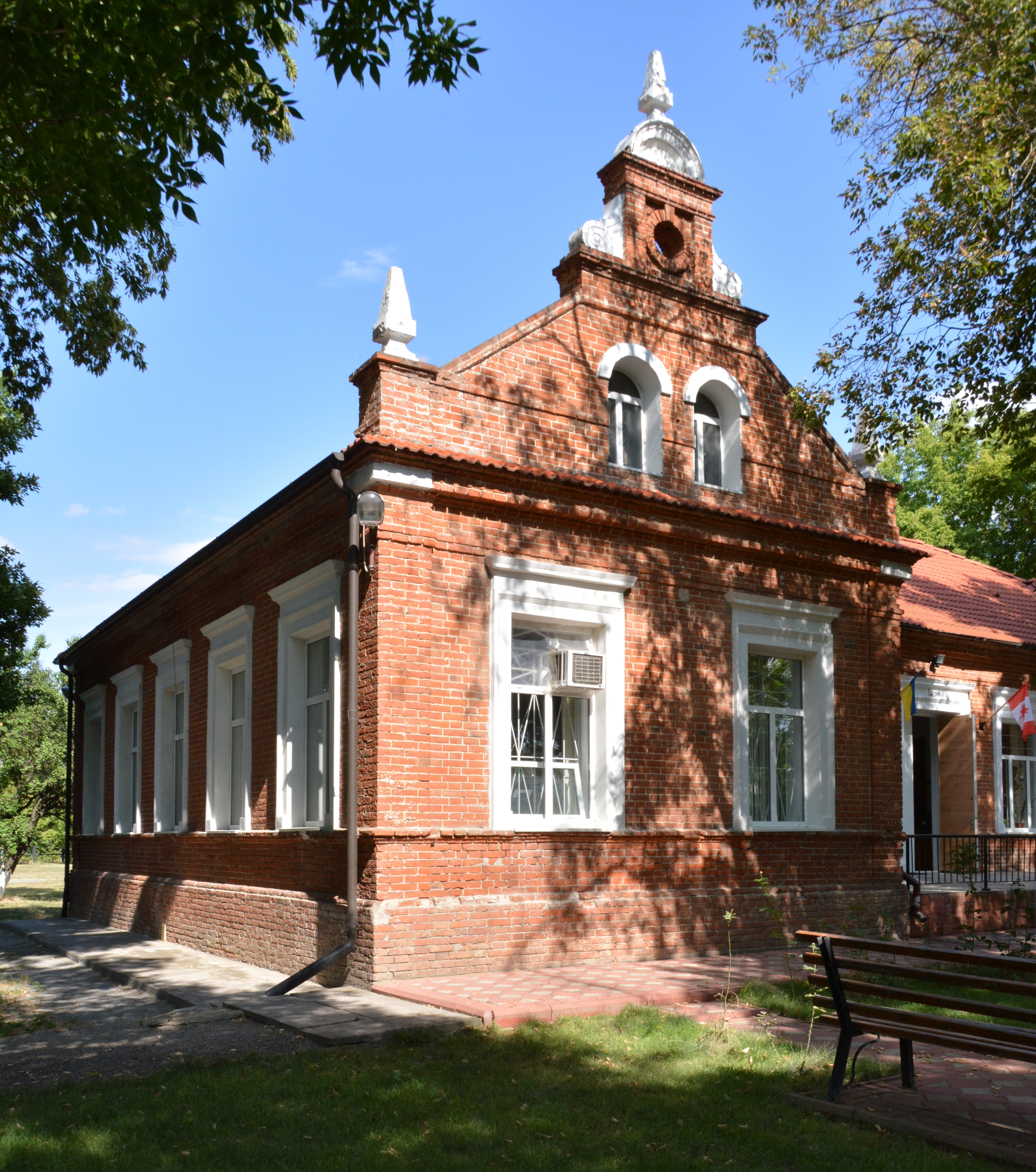
Mädchenschule (Girls' School), presently the Mennonite Centre

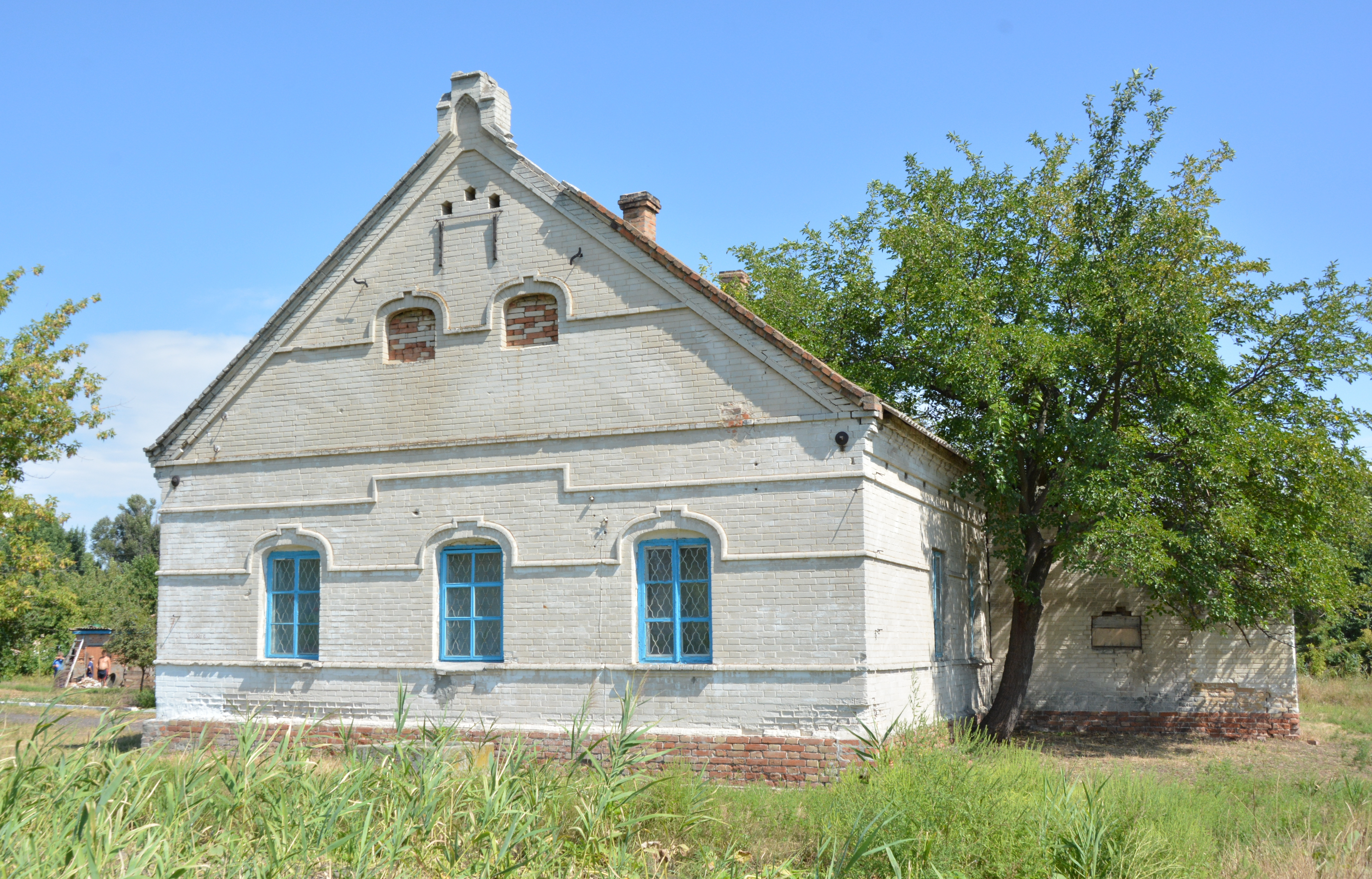
Mennonite Hospital

== See also ==
- Molotschna
