= Vitaliy Vozianov =

Ukrainian journalist

Vitaliy Fedorovych Vozianov
- Born: January 9, 1935 (age 91); Molochansk, Tokmak Raion, Zaporizhzhia Oblast, Ukrainian SSR
- Education: Taras Shevchenko National University of Kyiv
- Occupation: Journalist

Vitaliy Vozianov (born January 9, 1935) is a Ukrainian journalist and former director of the Ukrinform news agency.

== Biography ==
Vozianov was born on January 9, 1935 in Molochansk into a family of civil servants. The family moved to Dymer, Kyiv Oblast upon the death of Vozianov's father. He graduated from the Faculty of History and Philosophy of Taras Shevchenko National University of Kyiv in 1957.

He worked at the newspaper Vpered in Rovenky, Luhansk Oblast in the late 1950s, as well as the Luhansk newspaper Prapor Peremohy. He headed the editorial office of the Kyiv newspaper Molod Ukrainy in 1960.

Vozianov worked in the propaganda department of the Central Committee of Komsomol of Ukraine and in 1965 headed its publishing house Molod. He worked at the Komsomol until the 1980s.

He served as director of Ukrinform between 1993 and 1997, when he retired.
