= Volodymyr Karpov =

Ukrainian politician

Volodymyr Fedorovych Karpov
- Born: November 4, 1911; Molochansk, Taurida Governorate, Russian Empire
- Died: September 23, 1987 (aged 75); Zhdanov, Donetsk Oblast, Ukrainian SSR
- Occupation: Politician

Volodymyr Karpov (November 4, 1911 - September 23, 1987) was a Ukrainian politician and Deputy of the Supreme Soviet of the Ukrainian Soviet Socialist Republic.

== Biography ==
Karpov was born on November 4, 1911 in Molochansk (now Zaporizhzhia Oblast). He graduated from a technical school in 1931, when he became a technician at the Ordzhonikidze Kharkiv Tractor Factory. He was a milling machine operator, foreman and engineer at the Novokramatorsk Machine Building Factory in Kramatorsk, Stalino Oblast.

Karpov graduated from the Kharkiv Mechanical Engineering Institute in 1937.

He was in the Red Army between 1941 and 1945 and was a scout and a major in the Eastern Front.

Following the end of the war, Karpov was deputy chief technologist, production manager, and chief engineer of the Novokramatorsk Machine Building Factory, in which he worked at during the 1930s.

Karpov joined the Communist Party of the Soviet Union in 1949, and was an advisor to the Ministry of Heavy Engineering of the Soviet Union in East Germany. He was the chief engineer of the Machine Building Department of the Economic Council between 1957 and 1961.

Between 1961 and 1976, he was the director of the Zhdanov Heavy Engineering Factory, before becoming the general director of «Zhdanovvazhmash» in Zhdanov until 1980.

Karpov became a deputy of the Verkhovna Rada within the Ukrainian Soviet Socialist Republic in 1965 - a position he held until 1980.

He lived at 213/3, Apartment 18, Metalurhiv Avenue in Zhdanov (now Mariupol) until his death on September 24, 1987. He is buried at the Starokrymske Cemetery near Staryi Krym.

== Awards ==
Karpov received the State Prize of Ukraine in Science and Technology in 1978, the Hero of Socialist Labour in 1971, and the USSR State Prize in 1951. He became an honorary citizen of Mariupol on September 3, 1987 for his work during the Second World War.

== Legacy ==
There is a street named after Karpov in the Kalmiuskyi District of Mariupol, and in 2002 a statue was built to him at the Azovmash entrance.
