= Vladyslav Holota =

Ukrainian Scientist

Vladyslav Yakovych Holota
- Born: August 25, 1934; Molochansk, Ukrainian SSR
- Died: May 9, 2026 (92 years old); Kyiv, Ukraine
- Citizenship: Ukraine
- Education: Kyiv Medical Institute
- Occupation: Scientist
- Father: Yakiv Holota

Vladyslav Holota (August 25, 1934 - May 9, 2026) was a Ukrainian scientist who received the State Prize of Ukraine in Science and Technology.

Holota was a professor at the Kyiv Medical Institute for 30 years as the head of the Department of Obstetrics and Gynecology.

== Biography ==
Holota was born on August 25, 1934 in Molochansk, Zaporizhzhia Oblast.

He graduated from the Kyiv Medical Institute in 1959. He was invited to lead the Department of Obstetrics and Gynecology at the Luhansk Medical Institute in 1963, but he refused. In 1971 he became an associate professor at the Department of Obstetrics, Gynecology and Perinatology at the PL Shupyk National Medical Academy of Postgraduate Education in Kyiv.

He became a Doctor of Science in 1972 and became a professor in 1976. He also became the head of the Department of Obstetrics and Gynecology at the Poltava State Medical and Dental University. He was also the chief obstetrician-gynecologist of Kyiv and founded maternity hospital №2, №3, and №5, as well as a sanatorium for pregnant woman in Koncha-Zaspa.

Holota became a professor at the Kyiv Medical Institute in 1980 and founded the Department of Obstetrics and Gynecology №3.

During the Chornobyl Disaster of 1986, he was one of the first scientists to attend the scene to help children. He was awarded the title of Honoured Worker of Science and Technology of the Ukrainian SSR in 1989.

From 1990-1999, Holota was the dean of the Faculty of Pediatrics. He was awarded the State Prize of Ukraine in Science and Technology in 2006.

Holota retired in 2010 and died on May 9, 2026 at the age of 92.
