= Society for the Promotion of Spiritual and Moral Reading =

The Society for the Promotion of Spiritual and Moral Reading was a Christian society established in 1876 by Vasily Pashkov to publish and distribute Christian literature. 200 titles were produced. The deputy was Modest Korf.

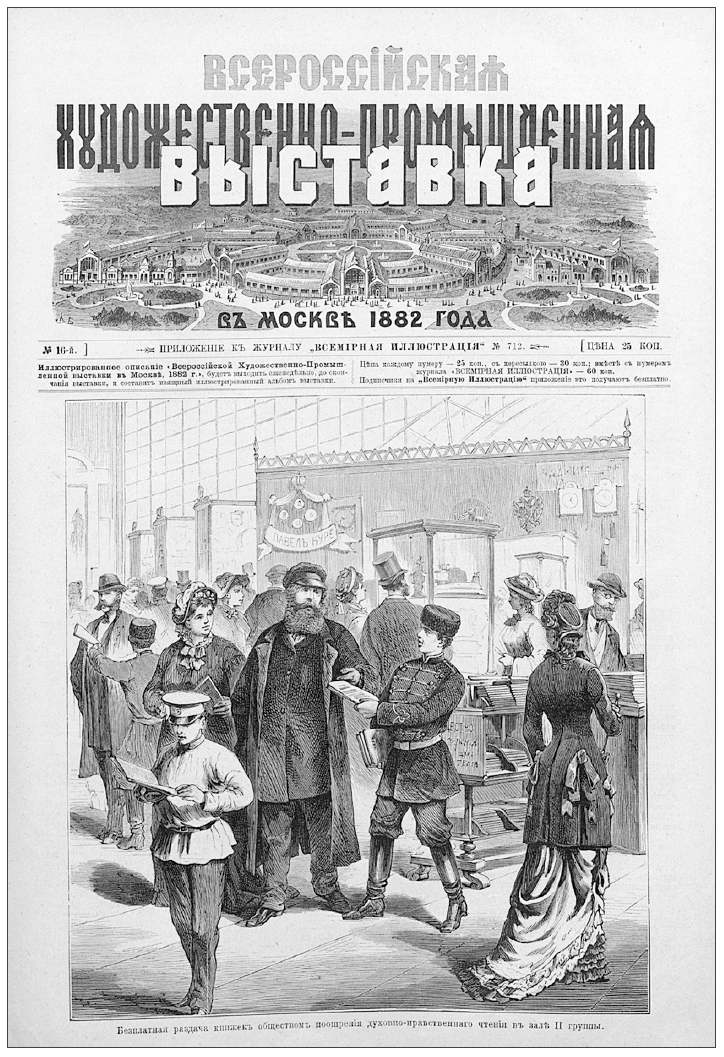
'Law and Faith', 1912 by Raduga

A large donation was from the London Religious Pamphlet Society. In the first two months of its existence, it published 150,000 pamphlets. 2.4 million pamphlets were produced in 1878.

The society's pamphlets were mainly produced in Saint Petersburg, but also in Odesa and Warsaw.

On May 24, 1884, the society was ordered to cease following the arrest of Pashkov and Korf that year, and their expulsion from Saint Petersburg.

Pashkov and Korf lived in exile. Raduga was founded in 1908 and was a successor to the society.
