= Leonid Herasymyuk =

Leonid Panasovych Herasymyuk
- Born: April 23 1926; Oryshchi, Porytsk, Russian Empire
- Died: August 18 2019 (aged 93); Molochansk, Tokmak Raion, Zaporizhzhia Oblast, Ukraine
- Citizenship: Ukraine
- Occupation: Soldier
- Organization: OUN-B

Leonid Herasymyuk (April 23, 1926-August 18, 2019) was an underground member of the Organisation of Ukrainian Nationalists, and a soldier in the Ukrainian Insurgent Army.

== Biography ==
Herasymyuk was born in the village of Oryshchi, near Porytsk, in the Russian Empire.

He was arrested by the Gestapo and sentenced to death for raising the Ukrainian flag on Kniazha Hora hill in Lviv in June 1941. He later escaped and joined the UPA.

He was captured by the NKVD in October 1944 and sentenced to be executed, while his family was sent to Siberia. He served a 10 year sentence of hard labour in copper mines in the Kazakh Soviet Socialist Republic, as well as working on the construction of the Baikonur Cosmodrome.

He was released early (he was supposed to have served 20 years) on September 12, 1954, when he visited his mother in Prokopyevsk, Kemerovo Oblast, where he worked at the Skhidnaya Mine. He moved to Molochansk, in Zaporizhzhia Oblast in 1976.

Herasymyuk became a volunteer in the Right Sector Ukrainian Volunteer Corps in Mariupol, upon the outbreak of the Russo-Ukrainian war.

Herasymyuk passed away on August 28, 2019.
