= Molochansk railway station =

Railway station in Zaporizhzhia Oblast, Ukraine

Molochansk Молочанськ

General information
- Location: Shkilna Street (Note: Formerly Lenin Street), Molochansk; Polohy Raion, Zaporizhzhia Oblast; Ukraine
- Coordinates: 47.2033°N 35.6149°E
- Owner: Ukrainian Railways
- Operator: Prydnipro Railways
- Manager: Vitaliy Repin
- Distance: 780 km to Kyiv
- Platforms: 2
- Tracks: 5

Other information
- Station code: 477203

History
- Opened: 1914
Location

Molochansk railway station is a railway station located on the Fedorivka - Verkhniy Tokmak II - Volnovakha line serving the city of Molochansk and surrounding villages.

The station was opened in 1914 as Poluhorod during the construction of the Tokmak Railway. The station was renamed to its current name in 1974.

The station was renovated in 2014 to coincide with its 100-year anniversary.

The station closed in February 2022 due to the Russo-Ukrainian war.

A passenger carriage was damaged by fire at the station due to Russian attacks in April 2022.

== Services ==
Until February 2022, the following services called at the station;

- 83/84 - Mariupol - Kyiv, Daily
- 67/67 - Mariupol - Lviv, Daily
- 77/78 - Mariupol - Kharkiv/Bakhmut, Every other day
- 141/142 - Mariupol - Odesa, Every other day
- 6893/6894 - Tokmak - Melitopol, cancelled on March 18, 2020.

The station received 840 passengers monthly and handled over 5,000 tonnes of freight in 2014.
