= Raduga (radio station) =

Radio station in Lithuania

Coordinates: 55.6837°N 21.1632°E

- Klaipėda; Lithuania
- Broadcast area: Klaipėda, Lithuania
- Frequency: 100.8 (MHz)
- Branding: "Raduga"

Programming
- Format: Music Radio

Ownership
- Owner: UAB M-1

History
- First air date: 1 September 2001
- Last air date: 17 January 2024

Raduga was a Russian-language music radio station that was licensed to Klaipėda, Lithuania. The station began broadcasting on 1 September 2001.

On 17 January 2024, the radio station ceased broadcasting and was replaced by M-1 Dance.

== Programs ==
- Nauja Diena
- Non Stop
- Geriausias Laikas
- 100 Ir 8 Malonumai
- Užvesk!
- Rožinė Spalva
- TOP-20
