= Raduga (Christian publishers) =

Christian publisher

Raduga (Радуга)
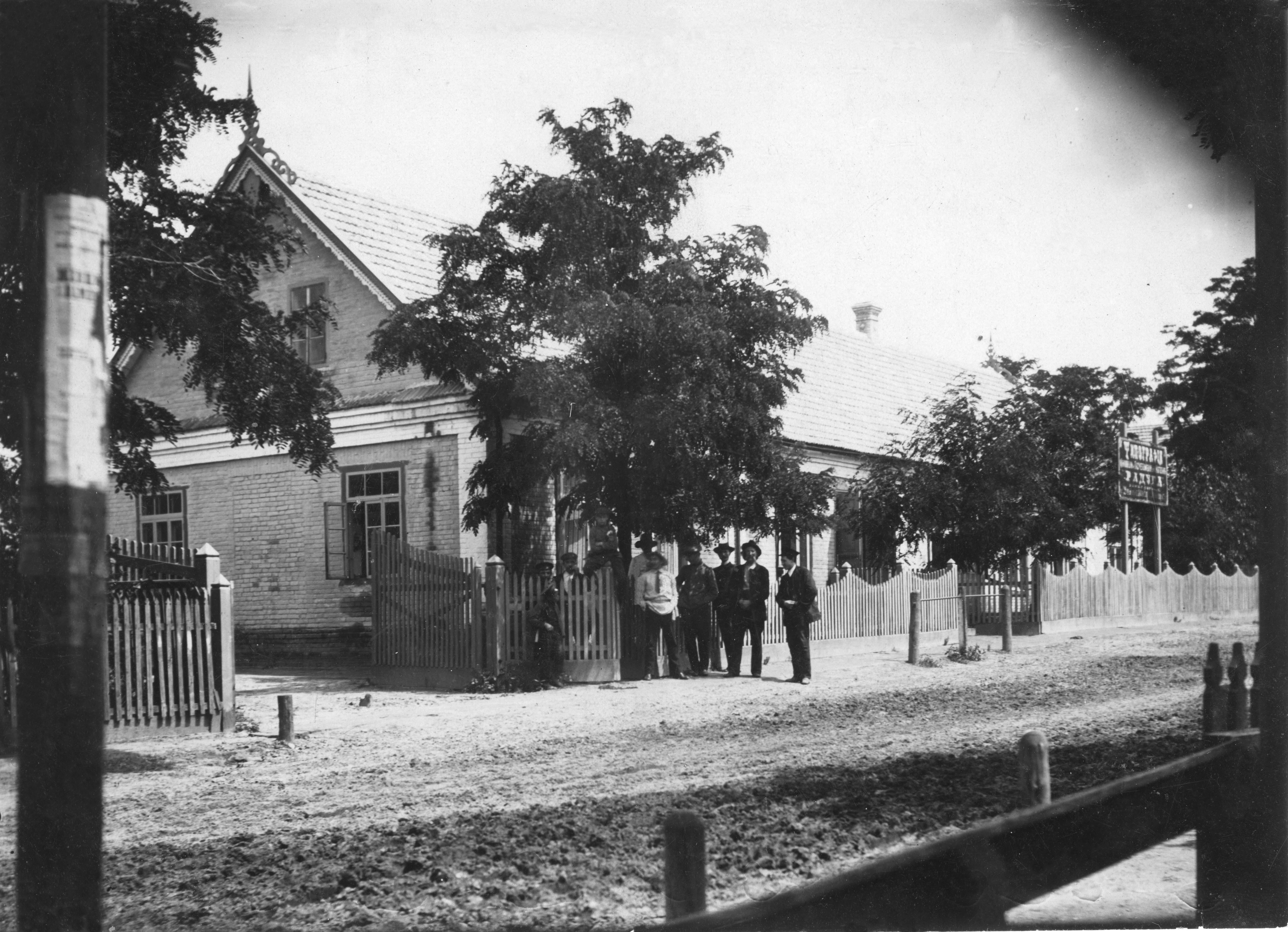
- Predecessor: Society for the Promotion of Spiritual and Moral Reading
- Founded: 1887
- Founder: Peter Neufeld
- Defunct: 1920
- Country of origin: Russian Empire
- Headquarters location: Halbstadt, Taurida Governorate
- Key people: Ivan Prokhanov

Raduga (Russian: Радуга)(German: Raduga) was a Christian publisher founded in 1887. It was based in Halbstadt (now Molochansk) in the Taurida Governorate of the Russian Empire. It had a branch and store in Petrograd (now St. Petersburg). It published religious literature in the Russian and German languages.

== History ==
The publisher was founded in Halbstadt in 1887 by Peter Neufeld, a Mennonite. He was a former teacher since 1850, and opened the publisher in his home. Neufeld was also the first Mennonite photographer.

Raduga was sold by Neufeld in 1903 to Heinrich J. Braun and Abraham Kroeker. The company became known as H. J. Braun and Company around this time.

The publisher opened a bookstore in Halbstadt, and Abraham Kroeker, and his brother Jacob began publishing the church newspaper of the Mennonite Brethren in Berlin. Its editorial office only moved to Halbstadt in January 1906 due to Tsarist censorship.

In 1904, the publisher acquired the bookstore of David Isaac in Oleksandrivsk, as well as the bookstore of Jacob Lotkemann in Halbstadt.

The publisher was renamed to Raduga in 1908 to remember the Russian Revolution of 1905 on the suggestion of the manager Ivan Prokhanov, who was a leader of Evangelical Christians in the Russian Empire. The collaboration with Prokhanov built relationships between the Mennonites and Russians, leading to a large amount of publications in the Russian language, and a store opened in St. Petersburg.

During World War I the store in Petrograd was used for religious meetings.

The publisher was extinguished in 1920.

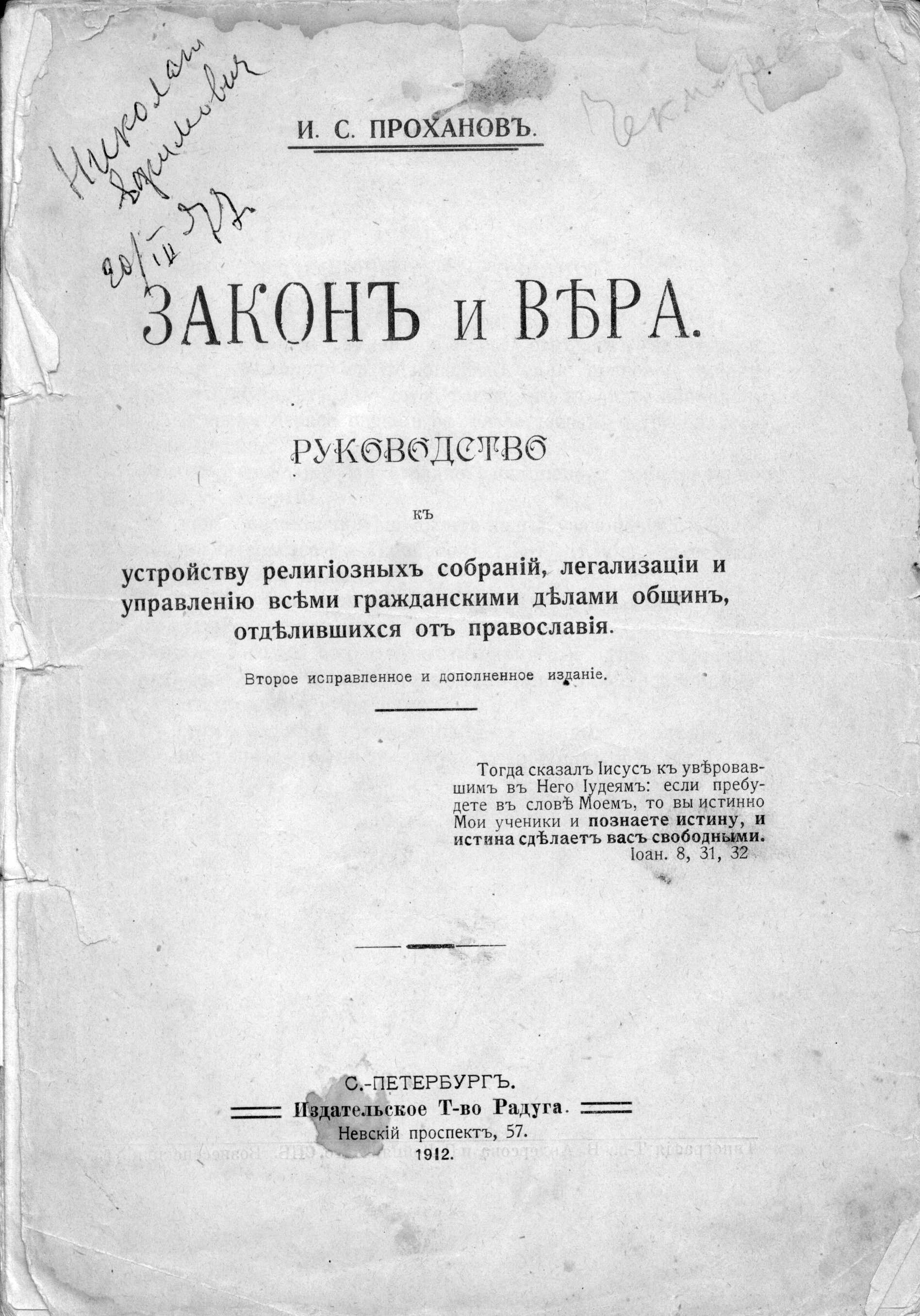
'Law and Faith', 1912 by Raduga
