= 2026 Nobel Peace Prize =

Award

- Navi Pillay
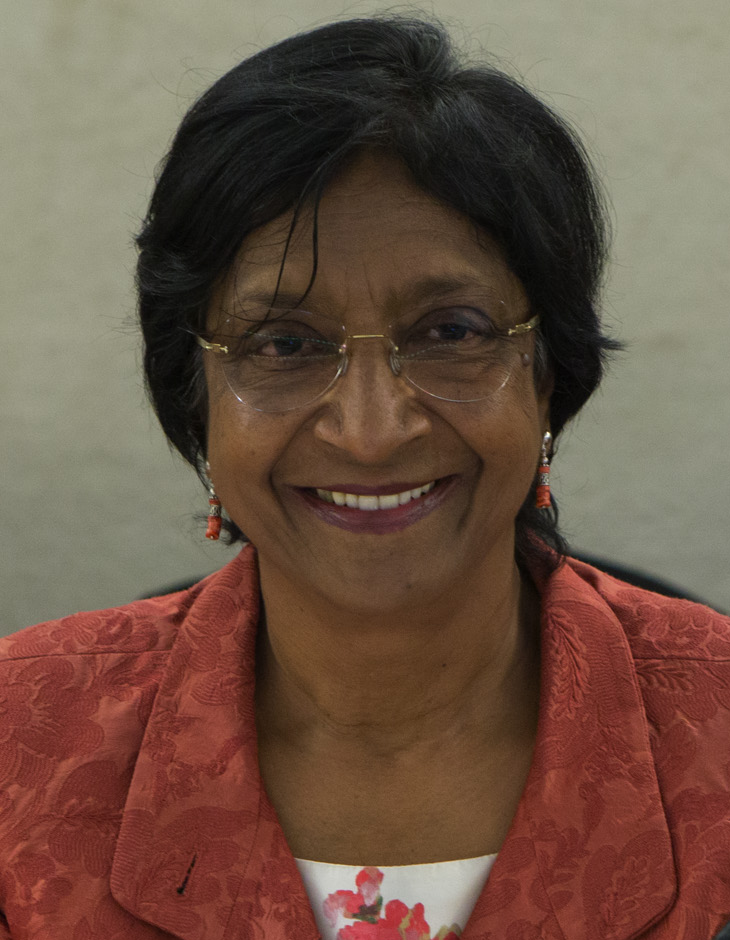
- "For her efforts to promote peace and international law."
- Date: 9 October 2026; (announcement); 10 December 2026; (ceremony)
- Location: Oslo, Norway
- Presented by: Norwegian Nobel Committee
- Reward: 12.0 million SEK
- First award: 1901
- Website: Official website

The 2026 Nobel Peace Prize is to be awarded to South African jurist Navi Pillay. This international peace prize was established according to Alfred Nobel's will that was announced on 9 October 2026 by the Norwegian Nobel Committee, and will be awarded on 10 December 2026 in Oslo, Norway.

== Navi Pillay ==
Pillay was born in Durban, South Africa, in 1941, to a family of Indian Tamil descent. In 1967, she founded her own law firm and defended anti-apartheid activists. She earned a Doctor of Juridical Science degree from Harvard University in 1988. In 1995, she was appointed to the High Court of South Africa. In 1999, she became a judge and President of the International Criminal Tribunal for Rwanda, where she helped establish that sexual violence could constitute crimes against humanity and genocide. She later served as a judge on the International Criminal Court and as United Nations High Commissioner for Human Rights from 2008 to 2014. In 2019, she became an ad hoc judge at the International Court of Justice in the case concerning alleged Rohingya genocide in Myanmar. From 2021 to 2025, she chaired the UN Independent International Commission of Inquiry on the Occupied Palestinian Territory.

Navi Pillay was awarded the 2026 Nobel Peace Prize "for her efforts to promote peace and international law." Pillay became the first South African woman to be awarded the Nobel Peace Prize. She is the fifth South African individual to do so, after Albert Luthuli (1960); Desmond Tutu (1984); and Nelson Mandela and FW de Klerk, who shared the prize in 1993.

Pillay learned of the award while attending an international conference in Courtroom 600 of the Nuremberg Palace of Justice, where the post-war trials of Nazi leaders took place. According to NobelPrize.org, the committee had been unable to contact her before the announcement; Norwegian Nobel Institute director Kristian Berg Harpviken subsequently conveyed the news personally. In a telephone interview, she associated the recognition with the institutions she had served and the people she had worked for.

== Reactions ==
=== South Africa and international institutions previously associated with Pillay ===
South African President Cyril Ramaphosa congratulated Pillay and praised her selection, saying she has "served humanity with principle and the belief that the world can and should be a better place." He celebrated her as the fifth South African to win the award. (Note: After Albert Luthuli, Desmond Tutu, Nelson Mandela and F. W. de Klerk.)

United Nations Secretary-General António Guterres celebrated her award as "a tribute to all those working to uphold and defend international law, the rule of law and human rights, and secure peace, justice and human dignity."

=== International ===
U.S. President Donald Trump criticised the Norwegian Nobel Committee, claiming it has "shamed itself beyond repair" for selecting Pillay, who Trump described as an "unabashed hater of America and Israel." He also repeated his claims that he settled 8 wars and subsequently argued he should have won the award 8 times. After the 2025 Nobel Peace Prize announcement he also claimed to have settled 8 wars and expressed disappointment in not being awarded the prize himself. Following his criticism of Pillay, Trump's administration announced further sanctions on the International Criminal Court, which Pillay served as a judge until 2008. Trump later said "Norway has become a shit house country, actually" and that he did not want immigration from the country "because I didn't get the Nobel Prize ... So I don't want anybody from Norway".

Israeli Prime Minister Benjamin Netanyahu also critiqued the decision, saying the committee "has lost its moral compass" for awarding "a bigot who built her career around inventing and propagating blood libels against the only Jewish state." The Independent International Commission of Inquiry on the Occupied Palestinian Territory, which Pillay chaired, reported that Netanyahu and his government displayed genocidal intent in the Gaza genocide.

Hamas welcomed the decision, described the award as "an important step toward international justice", praising Pillay's involvement in investigating Israel's military operations in Gaza and calling for further international legal action against Israeli officials.

== Other candidates ==
Two hundred and eight individuals and 79 organisations were nominated. While the Norwegian Nobel Committee maintains strict secrecy, individual nominators sometimes make their nominations known, whether to publicise themselves or their preferred candidate.

=== Qualified nominators ===
According to the statutes of the Nobel Foundation, a nomination is considered valid if it is submitted by a person or a group of people within these categories:

- 1. Members of national assemblies and national governments (cabinet members/ministers) of sovereign states as well as current heads of states;
- 2. Members of the International Court of Justice and Permanent Court of Arbitration in The Hague;
- 3. Members of Institute of International Law;
- 4. Members of the international board of the Women's International League for Peace and Freedom;
- 5. University professors, professors emeriti and associate professors of history, social sciences, law, philosophy, theology, and religion; university rectors and university directors (or their equivalents);
- 6. Directors of peace research institutes and foreign policy institutes;
- 7. Persons who have been awarded the Nobel Peace Prize;
- 8. Members of the main board of directors or its equivalent of organizations that have been awarded the Nobel Peace Prize;
- 9. Current and former members of the Norwegian Nobel Committee (proposals by current members of the Committee to be submitted no later than at the first meeting of the Committee after 1 February);
- 10. Former advisers to the Norwegian Nobel Committee.

Nominations confirmed by various news organisations
Nominee	Country/ Headquarters	Motivations	Nominator(s)	Source
Individuals
Mykola Kuleba (1972–)	Ukraine	"for rescuing Ukrainian children"	Peace Research Institute Oslo	
Hussam Abu Safiya (1973–)	Palestine	as [with Albanese] "an expression of respect for the courage, efforts, and perseverance of individuals who defend fundamental human values in the most difficult circumstances, representing a contribution to peace that transcends political divisions."	Matjaž Nemec et al. (Note: Led by Nemec, the nomination was signed by nearly 300 eligible proposers from 33 countries, including Brazil, South Africa, Canada, Australia, New Zealand, and the United Kingdom.) (1980–)	
Sara Al-Saqqa (1992–)	Palestine	as [with Albanese] "an expression of respect for the courage, efforts, and perseverance of individuals who defend fundamental human values in the most difficult circumstances, representing a contribution to peace that transcends political divisions."	Matjaž Nemec et al. (1980–)	
Francesca Albanese (1977–)	Italy	"for through her work, she has upheld the principles of international law and nonviolent accountability while amplifying the rights and voices of those most impacted by war, genocide, and injustice."	International Civil Society Action Network (founded in 2006); Women’s Alliance for Security Leadership (founded in 2015)	
Francesca Albanese (1977–)	Italy	"for her work for peace by reporting on the atrocities in Gaza, promoting concrete measures to end the war and pointing out the duty of Western leaders to stop their complicity in Israel's violations of international law."	Marie Sneve Martinussen (1985–)	
Francesca Albanese (1977–)	Italy	"[with Abu Safiya and Al-Saqqa] as an expression of respect for the courage, efforts, and perseverance of individuals who defend fundamental human values in the most difficult circumstances, representing a contribution to peace that transcends political divisions."	Matjaž Nemec et al. (1980–)	
John Coale (1946–)	United States	"[with Trump] for the successful mediation resulting in the release of over 300 political prisoners in Belarus and the restoration of diplomatic dialogue to stabilize security on the European Union's eastern borders."	Ignas Vėgėlė (1975–); Rimas Jonas Jankūnas (1967–); Petras Gražulis (1958–)	
Alokiir Malual (?–)	South Sudan	"who has worked for many years to advance peace, dialogue and women’s participation in the peace process in South Sudan."	Wolfgang Wagner (1989–); John Hogan (1986–); Vrije Universiteit Amsterdam	
Maia Sandu (1972–)	Moldova	"for her nonviolent struggle for democracy, the rule of law and peace."	Arild Hermstad (1966–)	
Greta Thunberg (2003–)	Sweden	"for her principled and non-violent efforts for peace, justice and international solidarity, especially in her efforts for Gaza, climate, and indigenous peoples."	Frøya Sjursæther (2006–)	
Donald Trump (1946–)	United States	"for his role in brokering a historic ceasefire between Israel and Hamas, a diplomatic breakthrough achieved through direct engagement with Egypt, Qatar, and Turkey."	Anna Paulina Luna (1989–)	
Donald Trump (1946–)	United States	"in recognition of his historic Abraham Accords and his record of advancing decisive diplomacy and delivering peace through strength."	Claudia Tenney (1961–)	
Donald Trump (1946–)	United States	"[with Coale] For the successful mediation resulting in the release of over 300 political prisoners in Belarus and the restoration of diplomatic dialogue to stabilize security on the European Union's eastern borders."	Ignas Vėgėlė (1975–); Rimas Jonas Jankūnas (1967–); Petras Gražulis (1958–)	
Volodymyr Zelenskyy (1978–)	Ukraine	"[with the people of Ukraine] for their efforts to preserve the peace of European democracies against Russian aggression."	Dag Øistein Endsjø (1968–)	
Yulia Navalnaya (1977–)	Russia	"for her work as a Russian opposition leader following the death of her husband, Alexei Navalny"	TBD	
Pope Leo XIV (1955–)	Vatican City; Peru; United States	"for his focus on humility, service, and climate action."	Christopher Hale (1989–)	
Dr. Hak Ja Han	South Korea	"her lifelong dedication to international peacebuilding, interfaith dialogue, humanitarian cooperation, and reconciliation on the Korean Peninsula"	Dr. Ján Figeľ (1960–)	
Nikolai Kurbatov (1990–)	Russia		Konstantin Klimenko-Bogdanov (1962–)	
Arthur Dénouveaux (1986–)	France		Éric Bothorel (1966–)	
Organizations
Save the Children (founded in 1919)	London	"with Mykola Kuleba for rescuing Ukrainian children"	Peace Research Institute Oslo	
International Association of Judges (founded in 1953)	Salzburg	"for their important function in defending democratic principles and controlling the exercise of authority."	Even Eriksen (1995–)	
International Criminal Court & International Court of Justice (founded in 1945)	The Hague	"for their important function in defending democratic principles and controlling the exercise of authority."	Even Eriksen (1995–)	
Sudan's Emergency Response Rooms	Sudan	"creating a, volunteer-led, grassroots network that provides lifesaving aid—food, medical care, and evacuation—amidst the 2023-2026 Sudanese civil war"	Peace Research Institute Oslo	
Minneapolis (founded in 1856)	United States	"for the moral leadership of the people and city of Minneapolis [setting] an example for those struggling against fascism everywhere on the face of a troubled planet."	The Nation (founded in 1865)	
Minneapolis (founded in 1856)	United States	"as tribute to the Minneapolis residents' fight against the immigration police ICE, responding with non-violence and solidarity."	Julie Estdahl Stuestøl (1983–)	
People of Ukraine	Ukraine	"[with Zelenskyy] for their efforts to preserve the peace of European democracies against Russian aggression."	Dag Øistein Endsjø (1968–)	
The Citizen Collective of the 'Light Revolution'	South Korea	"through disciplined, large-scale, and nonviolent civic resistance, the movement played a decisive role in defending constitutional democracy against martial law, protecting fundamental human rights, and preventing the escalation of political crisis into widespread violence."	Euiyoung Kim; Anselmo Lee; Pablo Onate; David Farrell; Azul Aguiar	
Concordis International	Central African Republic	"of peacebuilding work in fragile conflict zones."	Quakers Britian and USA	
United Nations Relief and Works Agency for Palestine Refugees (founded in 1949)	Amman	"for through its continuous and life-sustaining work, UNRWA has made a significant and lasting contribution to peace, human security and stability."	Une Bastholm (1989–)	
World Trade Organisation (founded in 1995)	Geneva	"its role as a cornerstone of the rules-based multilateral trading system, which aids in preventing trade wars and economic coercion, thereby fostering international stability"	Peace Research Institute Oslo	
Yad Vashem (founded in 1953)	Jerusalem	"one of the worlds most significant institutions in the fight against antisemitism, hate ideologies, and historical distortion."	Joel Ystebø (2001–)	
