= Bring Kids Back UA =

Ukrainian humanitarian program

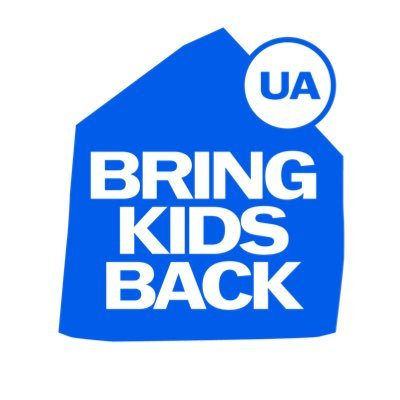

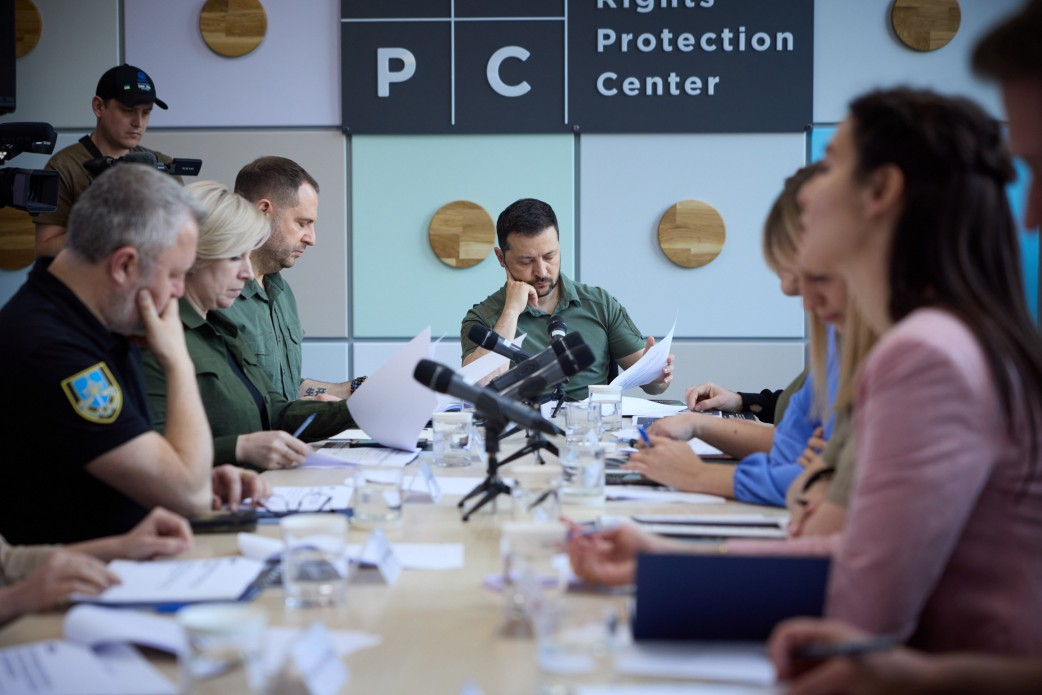
- During the presentation of the program, 31 May 2023
- Formation: 2023
- Type: State program
- Headquarters: Kyiv, Ukraine
- Official language: Ukrainian, English
- Website: bringkidsback.org.ua

Bring Kids Back UA is a Ukrainian humanitarian program created at the initiative of the President of Ukraine Volodymyr Zelenskyy in 2023. It unites the efforts of the authorities of Ukraine, other states, international and non-governmental organizations to return to their homeland all Ukrainian children abducted by Russia during the Russian invasion of Ukraine, which began in 2022. The program provides for the reintegration of deported children, their socialization, the development of family forms of upbringing, as well as the recording of crimes and bringing the Russian Federation to justice for these crimes, in particular at the International Criminal Court in The Hague.

The Bring Kids Back UA Action Plan is aimed at implementing the Peace Formula of President Volodymyr Zelenskyy, in particular paragraph 4 "Release of all prisoners and deportees". The implementation of the action plan is coordinated by the Coordination Council for the Protection and Safety of Children under the President of Ukraine, headed by the Head of the Office of the President of Ukraine Andriy Yermak.

== Background ==
During the Russian invasion of Ukraine, the Russian Federation forcibly moved thousands of Ukrainian children from some territories under their control to other controlled territories, granted them Russian citizenship (depending on age), forced Russian families to adopt them, and created obstacles to the reunification of children with their parents and homeland. Ukrainian children were abducted by the Russian state after their parents were arrested by Russian occupation authorities in the temporarily occupied territories of Ukraine or killed during the invasion, or after being separated from their parents in a zone of active hostilities. Children were also abducted from Ukrainian foster care institutions in the occupied territories and through children's "summer camps" on Russian territory. The abducted children were subjected to forced Russification. Raising children of war in a foreign nation and culture constitutes an act of genocide because it aims to erase their national identity.

The United Nations has stated that these deportations are war crimes, that the allegations are "credible", and that Russian forces sent Ukrainian children to Russia for adoption as part of a large-scale program.

Estimates of the number of Ukrainian children deported to Russia range from 19,546 to 307,000 with no indication of when they will be able to return to their hometowns. As of the beginning of August 2024, more than 750 children were returned, of which 446 were evacuated by the Save Ukraine charitable organization. The number of children affected by the Russian Federation is estimated at about 1.5 million.

On March 17, 2023, the International Criminal Court (ICC) in The Hague issued arrest warrants for Russian President Vladimir Putin and Russian Presidential Commissioner for Children's Rights Maria Lvova-Belova for the illegal deportation of Ukrainian children.

On April 27, the Parliamentary Assembly of the Council of Europe adopted a resolution in which it recognized the forced transfer of Ukrainian children to Russia as genocide.

== History of creation ==
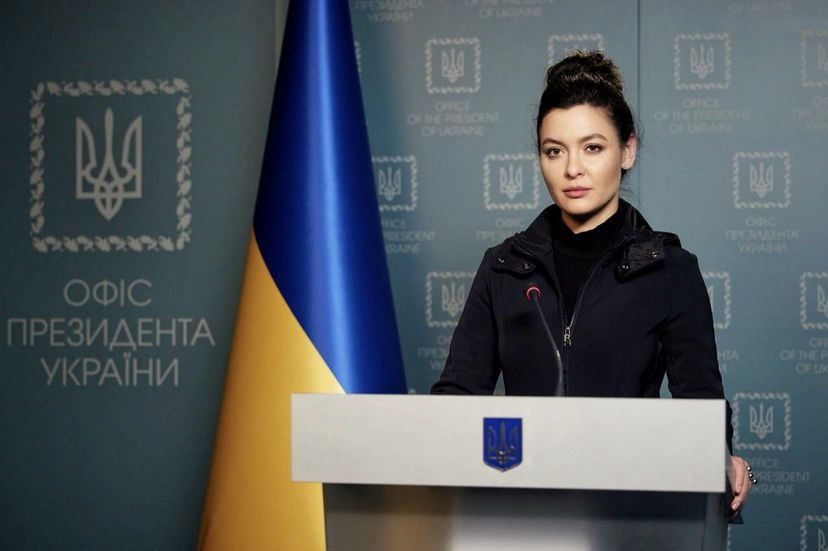
Daria Zarivna, chief operating officer of Bring Kids Back UA

For the first time, Daria Zarivna, Communications Advisor to the Head of the Office of the President and Chief Operating Officer of Bring Kids Back UA, spoke about the program on May 15, 2023. She emphasized that a new movement has been created in Ukraine — "a new foundation, a new Think tank called Bring Kids Back UA." During her speech at the Copenhagen Democracy Summit 2023, in the capital of Denmark, Zarivna invited to join this movement and help bring thousands of Ukrainian children home

"I talked about how Russians kidnap Ukrainian children, take them by force from the temporarily occupied territories, as well as about the launch of our new movement Bring Back Kids UA, around which we want to unite the world in order to stop Russian crimes together and return our children. According to our data, about 20 thousand children were forcibly taken to Russia. Although the number of such crimes may be much higher and reach more than 100 thousand."

— Daria Zarivna

On May 31, 2023, on the eve of International Children's Day, President Volodymyr Zelenskyy opened the Children's Rights Protection Center and presented the Bring Kids Back UA plan for the return of children. The event was also joined by: Head of the Office of the President Andriy Yermak, Minister for Reintegration of Temporarily Occupied Territories Iryna Vereshchuk, Prosecutor General Andriy Kostin, Advisor – Commissioner of the President of Ukraine Daria Herasymchuk, Verkhovna Rada Commissioner for Human Rights Dmytro Lubinets, and Head of the Coordination Center for the Development of Family Education and Child Care Iryna Tuliakova.

"The first step has been taken, 371 children are at home, in Ukraine. We will do everything to bring everyone back, and, probably, the main meaning is in the name of the Bring Kids Back UA program. I sincerely wish us this – to return all children home, to Ukraine, and I fully support this program. I want to return the children as soon as possible. This is the most important thing."

— Volodymyr Zelenskyy

In September 2023, as part of the implementation of the Bring Kids Back UA action plan approved by Volodymyr Zelenskyy, the information campaign "You know, tell me!" (Ukrainian: Знаєш – скажи!, romanized: Znaiesh – skazhy!). It is aimed at motivating people living in Russia to oppose the forced deportation of Ukrainian children and facilitate the return of young Ukrainian citizens to Ukraine. To do this, the FREEДОМ television channel, aimed at Russian-speaking viewers outside Ukraine, will broadcast informational videos, stories, special projects and columns aimed primarily at the audience living in Russia.

On October 16, as part of the Bring Kids Back UA program, four children from 2 to 17 years old, previously deported by Russia, were returned to Ukraine, said the head of the Office of the President Andriy Yermak. This became possible thanks to the negotiations mediated by Qatar.

On October 19, 2023, the "Bring Kids Back UA" platform was launched, which will inform the world community about the deportation of Ukrainian children by Russia.

On October 29, during the third meeting of national security and foreign policy advisers held in Malta, delegates from Canada proposed the creation of an international coalition of countries that would facilitate, among other things, the return of Ukrainian children deported or forcibly displaced by Russia from the temporarily occupied territories of Ukraine. This initiative will be a continuation of the Bring Kids Back UA plan.

== Action plan ==
The Bring Kids Back UA Action Plan consists of seven key blocks that provide for specific actions and measures:

- the return of Ukrainian children deported by Russia (involves the involvement of UN agencies, other international organizations, governments, as well as the creation of a high-level international working group Bring Kids Back UA);
- development of family forms of education;
- reintegration of children returned from the Russian Federation, organization of their socialization and return, as well as educational initiatives;
- the creation of the Child Rights Protection Center (Центру захисту прав дітей), which was opened by the President on May 30, 2023;
- recording crimes and bringing to justice the Russian Federation;
- inter-parliamentary interaction;
- Communication and public events.

Each block is assigned a responsible state body. The coordination of the implementation of the Bring Kids Back UA action plan will be carried out by the Coordination Council for the Protection and Safety of Children under the President of Ukraine, headed by the Head of the Office of the President Andriy Yermak.

=== International Expert Group ===
Within the framework of the Bring Kids Back UA action plan, an International Expert Group (Ukrainian: Міжнародна експертна група, romanized: Mizhnarodna expertna grupa) has been formed, which consists of specialists who are deeply aware of the problems of children's rights.

The group is co-chaired by Head of the Office of the President Andriy Yermak and Helena Kennedy, Baroness Kennedy of The Shaws, a British lawyer who was named by the BBC in 2021 as one of the 100 women who change the world.

The group focuses on developing expert opinions and recommendations on effective mechanisms for the return of children to Ukraine, as well as improving existing international legal mechanisms to prevent similar situations with violations of children's rights around the world.

=== Children's Rights Protection Center ===
On May 31, 2023, the Center for the Protection of Children's Rights (Ukrainian: Центр захисту прав дітей, romanized: Tsentr zakhystu prav ditey) was opened. This is an interdepartmental center for children who have become victims of crimes or witnessed them, where relevant specialists can:

- get information from children and their families;
- conduct a medical examination, in particular for forensic purposes;
- provide the necessary therapeutic assistance.

The center includes a children's corner for leisure, as well as a room where the Center's specialists work according to the Barnahus model.

=== Inter-parliamentary interaction ===
The Bring Kids Back UA Action Plan provides for intensive interaction of the Verkhovna Rada of Ukraine and people's deputies with parliaments of other countries of the world.

On May 3, 2023, people's deputies of Ukraine supported the draft resolution "On the Appeal of the Verkhovna Rada of Ukraine to the Parliaments and Governments of Foreign States, International Organizations and Their Inter-Parliamentary Assemblies to Condemn the Crimes of Forced Deportation of Ukrainian Children Committed by the Russian Federation" (No. 9267). After that, resolutions of parliaments around the world were adopted. The deportation was condemned, for example, by the French Senate, the Polish Sejm, and the Slovak Parliament.

On April 27, 2023, the PACE adopted a resolution on the forced deportation of Ukrainian children and adults by the Russian side, recognizing such actions as genocide. The document was supported by 87 parliamentarians out of 89 present. The resolution states that the Russian Federation must immediately stop the illegal forced transfer and deportation of Ukrainian children and adults, as well as stop granting them Russian citizenship.

== International reactions ==
- Europe: On June 1, 2023, International Children's Day, President of the European Commission Ursula von der Leyen called on Russia to stop the deportation of Ukrainian children and supported the Bring Kids Back UA program.
  "In the meantime, we are committed to doing everything necessary to locate deported Ukrainian children, facilitate their safe return and provide them with the necessary social, medical and educational support upon their return. President Zelenskyy's Bring Kids Back UA plan can play a decisive role in this endeavour."
  — Ursula von der Leyen
- Canada: During the third meeting of National Security and Foreign Policy Advisers held in Malta, the Canadian delegation proposed the creation of an international coalition of countries that would facilitate the return of Ukrainian children forcibly removed by Russia from the temporarily occupied territories of Ukraine. This initiative will be a continuation of the Bring Kids Back UA program.
- Qatar: Qatar took part in the Bring Kids Back UA program at the request of the Ukrainian government and played a significant role in large-scale negotiations that lasted several months. In particular, they helped to return children from 2 to 17 years old to Ukraine, who were illegally deported by Russian citizens. The representative of the Ministry of Foreign Affairs of Qatar, Lolwah Al-Khater, expressed satisfaction with the good news about the reunification of children with their families in Ukraine, the result of which was achieved thanks to the mediation efforts of Qatar.
- Netherlands: The Minister of Foreign Affairs of the Netherlands, Hanke Bruins Slot, announced the Netherlands' intention to support Ukraine in the Bring Kids Back UA project on family reunification using DNA. Using rapid DNA tests, the Netherlands aims to help Ukraine create a DNA database that will allow it to quickly establish family ties for children abducted by Russia and facilitate their early return to their families.
- Germany: On September 7, 2023, a panel discussion was held in the German Bundestag in support of the Bring Kids Back UA program, dedicated to deepening cooperation between Ukraine and Germany for the return home of Ukrainian children abducted by Russia. The event was organized by a group of German deputies with the assistance of the Embassy of Ukraine in Germany and the German-Ukrainian Parliamentary Group.
