= Mykola Kuleba =

Ukrainian children's rights activist

- Микола Кулеба
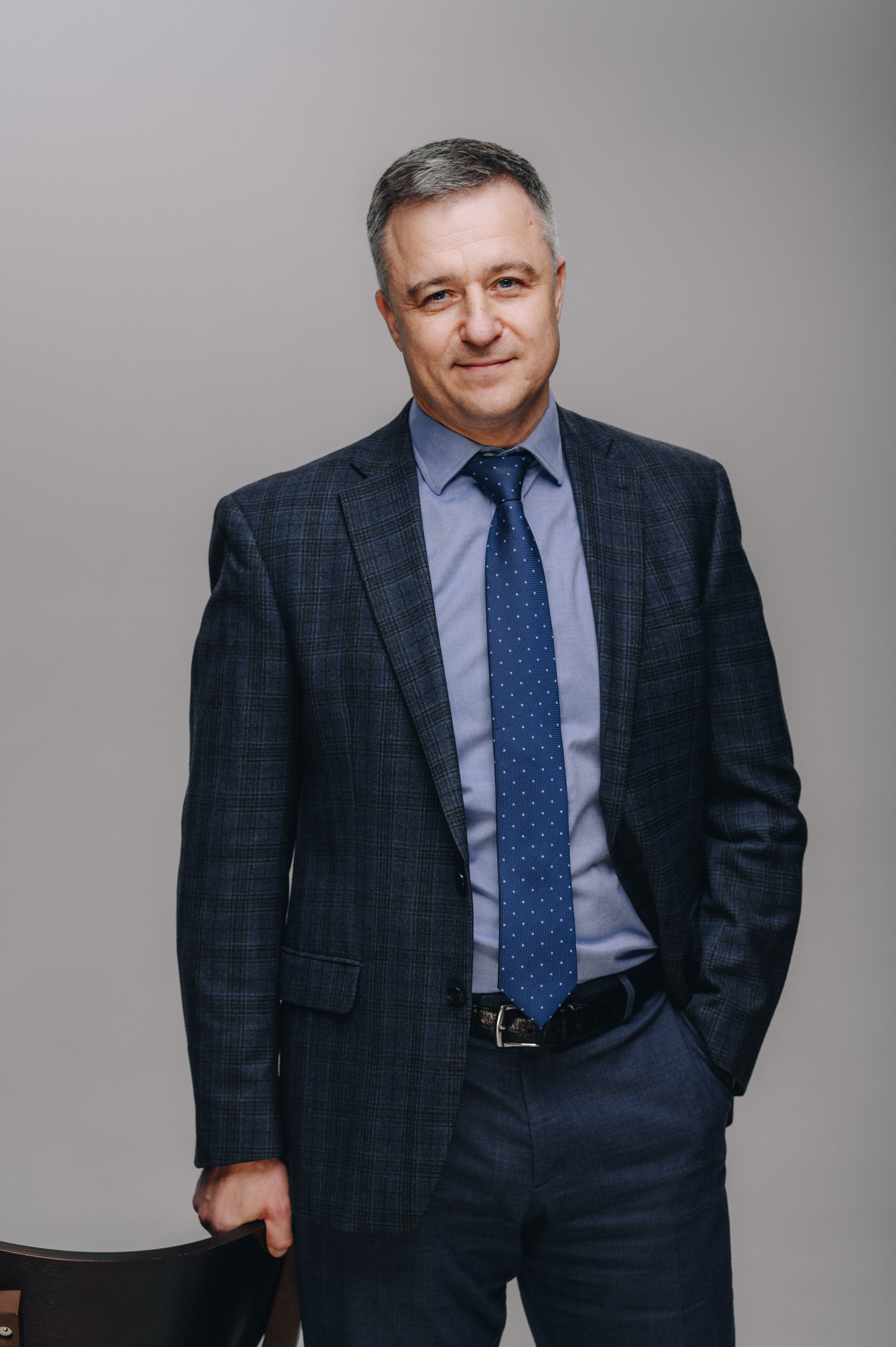
- Born: 23 March 1972 (age 54); Kyiv, Ukrainian SSR, Soviet Union
- Organization: Save Ukraine
- Website: www.saveukraineua.org

Mykola Mykolaiovych Kuleba (Ukrainian: Микола Миколайович Кулеба) is a Ukrainian children's rights activist. He is a pioneer of Ukraine's children's rights movement and initiated child welfare reforms and legislation to move Ukraine away from Soviet-era policies towards Western practices.

Kuleba was a winner in the 2023 Magnitsky Human Rights Awards for “Outstanding Human Rights Activist”.

== Life and education ==
Kuleba was born on 23 March 1972 in Kyiv, in the then Ukrainian Soviet Socialist Republic of the Soviet Union. In 1994 he graduated from the Kyiv Institute of National Economy. In 2008 Kuleba graduated from the European University of Finance, Information Systems, Management and Business.

Kuleba is married and has four children.

== Work in children's rights ==
Mykola decided to devote his life to saving children when he met a group of homeless children who lived next to a sewer drainage site near Kyiv's Demiivska Square. As a result of that experience, Mykola Kuleba created a network of centers in Kyiv to care for orphans, with the goal of returning them to their homes or placing them with a foster family them.

Kuleba continued to support this cause, and was the head of the Kyiv Children's Service (2006-2014). Following this, he was appointed the Commissioner of the President of Ukraine for Children's Rights 17 December 2014. In this role, he united and coordinated the government and the public sector to develop a cohesive state-level policies and programs that created effective mechanisms for preventing, detecting and combating human trafficking and providing assistance to victims of human trafficking. Kuleba is credited with reducing levels of human trafficking in Ukraine through these initiatives. He authored the national strategy for deinstitutionalization, and created policies and introduced penalties to protect children from bullying, including cyberbullying. He ended his service as the commissioner in 2021.

Kuleba co-founded Save Ukraine and the Ukraine Without Orphans Alliance. He serves as the head of Save Ukraine.

Kuleba has presented on children's rights in the House of Commons of Canada, the US Congress, the Foreign Affairs Committee of the UK Parliament, the UN Security Council, and participated in panel discussions at the World Economic Forum, the Clinton Global Initiative, and the Global Peace Summit.

== Activities after the beginning of the Russian-Ukrainian war ==
With Russia's invasion of Crimea and Donbas in 2014, he co-founded the Save Ukraine rescue network, with coordinates dozens of organizations, volunteers, individuals and legal entities to help internally displaced persons, with a special emphasis on children. Save Ukraine has evacuated over 160,000 people from the frontlines and provided more than 120,000 people with psychological assistance. Every day, the Save Ukraine hotline receives more than 300 requests for assistance and runs an expanding network of community centers that addresses war-related trauma and works to restore dignity to people's lives by providing food, shelter, medical and mental health care. Since the beginning of the full-scale invasion, Save Ukraine been engaged in the return of deported children to Ukraine. Mykola Kuleba's team has returned over 565 forcibly transferred children back to Ukraine from Russia and the temporarily occupied territories.

Save Ukraine cooperates with the Office of the President of Ukraine, the Verkhovna Rada Commissioner, the Advisor to the Presidential Commissioner for Children's Rights and Child Rehabilitation, the Office of the Prosecutor General of Ukraine and regional prosecutor's offices, and is a member of the Presidential Initiative Bring Kids Back UA.

At the international level, Save Ukraine cooperates with global and national organizations and authorities from 5 continents — Canada, the United Kingdom, the United States, Germany, Poland, Japan, South Korea, the Netherlands, Switzerland, Australia, Brazil, Uganda, and the European Parliament, European Union, UN, World Economic Forum, International Committee of the Red Cross, UNDP, UNICEF, OSCE, European Commission, UNHCR, 41 countries of the International Coalition for the Return of Ukrainian Children, and the International Criminal Court.
