= Belarus Red Cross =

Humanitarian non-governmental organization in Belarus

Belarusian Red Cross
- Беларускі Чырвоны Крыж; Белорусский Красный Крест
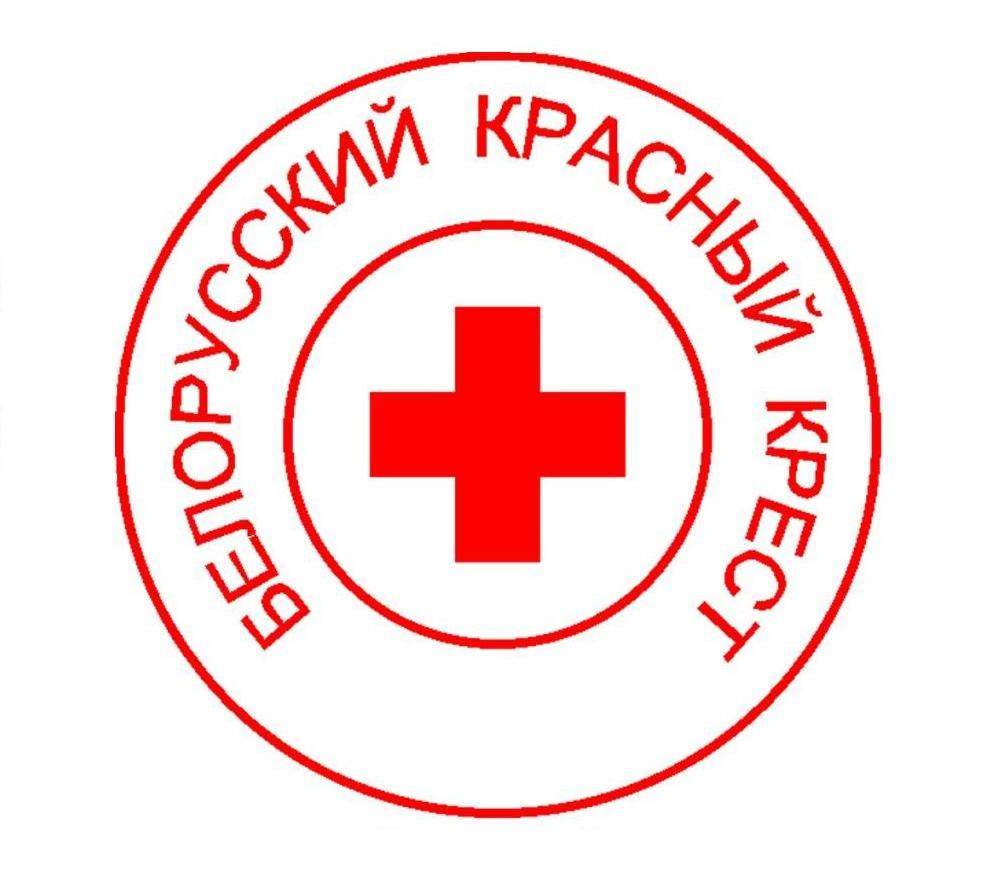

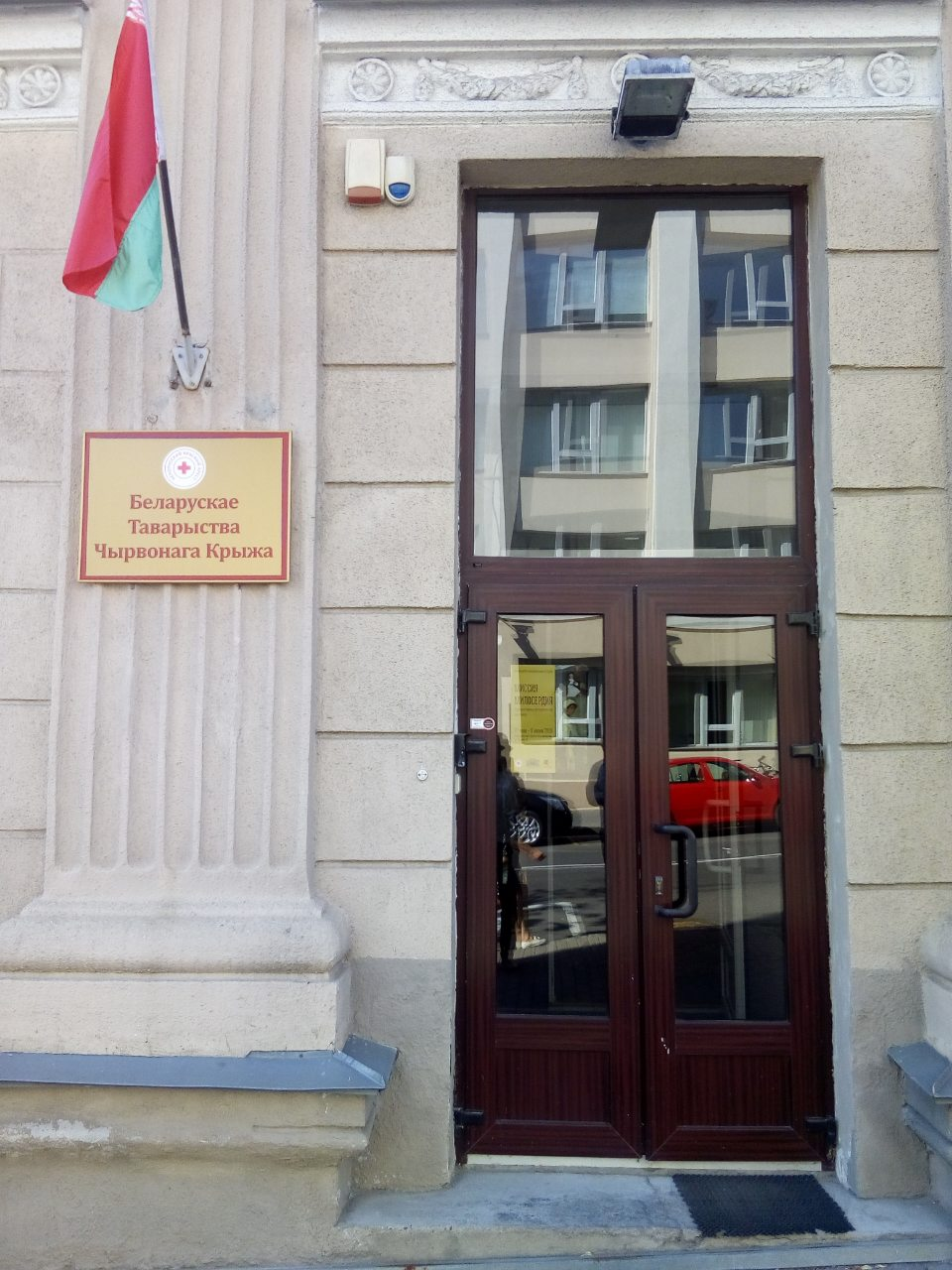
- BRC office in Minsk
- Formation: 1967
- Headquarters: Minsk, Belarus
- Region served: Belarus
- Secretary General: Dzmitry Shautsou
- Chairman: Dmitry Cherednichenko
- Parent organization: International Federation of Red Cross and Red Crescent Societies (suspended)
- Staff: 366 (2016)
- Volunteers: 22,459 (2016)
- Website: redcross.by

The Belarusian Red Cross Society (Belarusian: Беларускае Таварыства Чырвонага Крыжа, romanized: Bielaruskaje Tavarystva Čyrvonaha Kryža; Russian: Белорусское Общество Красного Креста, romanized: Belorusskoye Obshchestvo Krasnogo Kresta) is a Belarusian humanitarian organization and national Red Cross society of Belarus. It is currently suspended from the International Red Cross and Red Crescent Movement since 2023, because the current head of the Belarusian Red Cross (Dzmitry Shautsou) was involved in child abductions during the Russo-Ukrainian war.

Though first operating in the territory of what is now Belarus in 1872 as the Minsk local branch of the Russian Red Cross, the organization was officially founded in 1967. Within Belarus, it currently operates 166 regional and local branches.

== Involvement in the Russo-Ukrainian War ==
In an interview in Russian-occupied Lysychansk, Luhansk Oblast, Ukraine that was aired on state TV channel Belarus-1 on 19 July 2023, the head of the organization, Dzmitry Shautsou, wearing military clothes with the Z symbol, openly admitted to the abduction and deportation of Ukrainian children from Russian-occupied areas to Belarus for “health improvement” reasons during the Russian invasion of Ukraine, saying that it would continue to do so.

The International Federation of Red Cross and Red Crescent Societies dissociated itself from his statements, while expressing "grave concern" and demanding a halt to the practice. It also triggered an investigation by the body's investigative committee.

On 4 October 2023 the IFRC completed its investigation, finding that Shautsou breached the organisation's guidelines, and called for him to be removed by 30 November 2023 under the threat of suspending the BRC's membership. After the BRC refused to take any action on removing Shautsou, the group was formally suspended on 1 December 2023. Shautsou condemned the organisation's suspension, calling it "absolutely politicised" and claiming that he was assisting the safe return of Ukrainian children. On December 5, 2023, the United States Department of the Treasury’s Office of Foreign Assets Control has added Dzmitry Shautsou to its Specially Designated Nationals and Blocked Persons List.

In January 2024, the Buro Media project published an investigation that the BRC spent a significant part of the funds (including those received from the IFRC) on maintaining an inflated staff and on business trips for its own management.

In February 2024, the European Union announced the 13th round of sanctions on Russia, and Shautsou was included in the sanctions list. He was also blacklisted by Australia on the same day, by Switzerland in March and by New Zealand in September.
