= Dzmitry Shautsou =

Belarusian doctor and politician

- Дзмітрый Шаўцоў; Дмитрий Шевцов
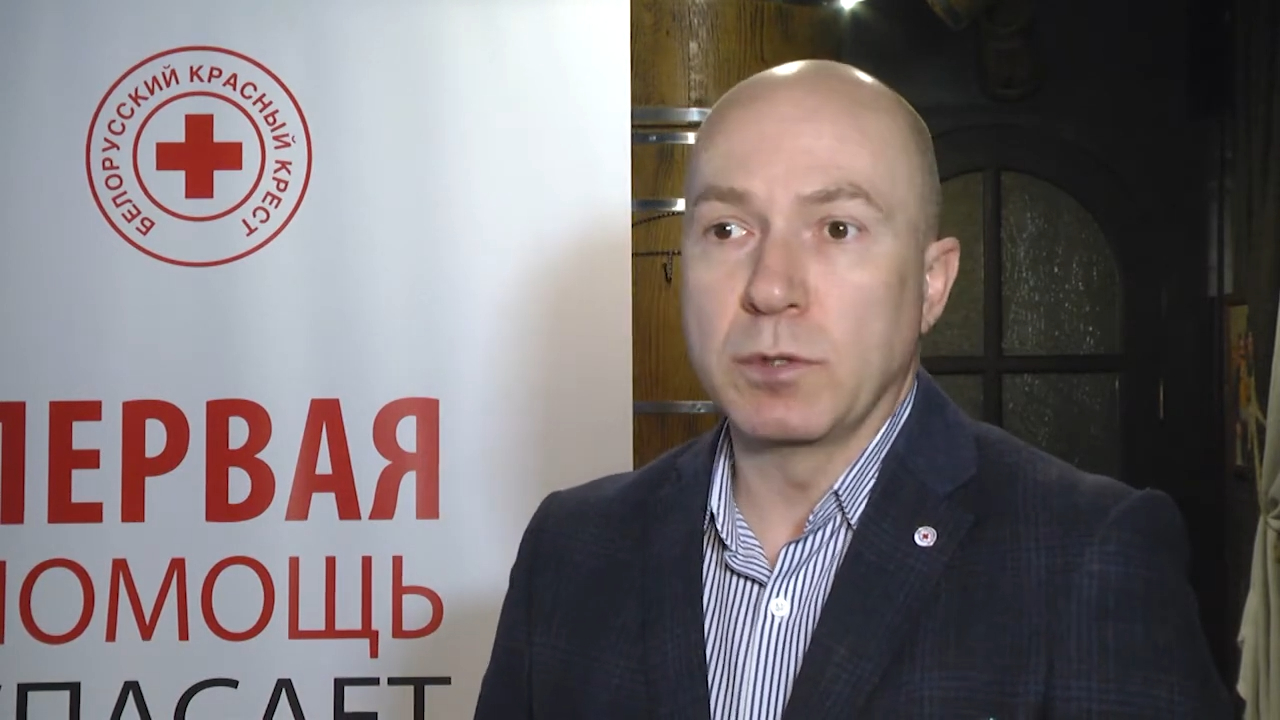

General Secretary of the Belarus Red Cross
- Incumbent
- Assumed office 10 June 2021
- Preceded by: Volha Myčko

Deputy of the House of Representatives
- Incumbent
- Assumed office 2024
- Preceded by: Galina Lagunova
- Constituency: Minsk-Paŭnocnaja
- In office 18 October 2012 – 6 December 2019
- Preceded by: Halina Palianskaja
- Succeeded by: Siarhiej Dzik
- Constituency: Minsk-Kolasaŭskaja
- In office 2003 – 17 October 2004
- Succeeded by: Nina Kabiernik
- Constituency: Zhlobin

Personal details
- Born: 3 November 1973 (age 52)
- Party: Independent
- Education: Belarusian State Medical University; Gomel State Medical University; Academy of Public Administration

Dzmitry Yaŭhienavič Shautsou (Belarusian: Дзмітрый Яўгенавіч Шаўцоў, romanized: Dzmitry Yaŭhienavič Šaŭcoŭ; Russian: Дмитрий Евгеньевич Шевцов, romanized: Dmitry Yevgenyevich Shevtsov; born 3 November 1973) is a Belarusian physician and politician currently serving as head of the Belarus Red Cross since 10 June 2021. He is currently served as a deputy of the House of Representatives since 2024, and had been a deputy before, most recently from 2012 to 2019. Shautsou has acquired controversy as head of the Belarus Red Cross for statements in support of homophobia, Child abductions in the Russo-Ukrainian War, and the stationing of Russian nuclear weapons in Belarus, for which the group was suspended from the International Federation of Red Cross and Red Crescent Societies on 1 December 2023.

== Early life and career ==
Dzmitry Shautsou was born on 3 November 1973. He was raised in the city of Zhlobin, before graduating from the Belarusian State Medical University. He later studied at Gomel State Medical University.

In 2000 Shautsou became the deputy main doctor at Zhlobin District Central Hospital. In 2005 Shautsou moved to the Belarusian capital, Minsk, where he worked at the 34th Clinic. Within a year, he became the clinic's head doctor.

== Political career ==
From 2003 until the 2004 Belarusian parliamentary election Shautsou briefly served as a deputy of the House of Representatives from Zhlobin. In this time, he sought to acquire further funding for the Zhlobin District Central Hospital. After this, he became a deputy of the Minsk City Council of Deputies before returning to national politics in the 2012 Belarusian parliamentary election, successfully running as a candidate in the Minsk-Kolasaŭskaja electoral district. He was re-elected in 2016, and served as head of the Minsk Electoral Commission during the 2019 Belarusian parliamentary election. After protests broke out, Shautsou defended the results, accusing protesters of being "provocateurs".

== Belarus Red Cross ==
On 10 September 2021, Shautsou was appointed as head of the Belarus Red Cross by the body's presidium, succeeding Volha Myčko after her five-year term expired. Myčko praised Shaustou after his appointment, saying that he had a "human heart". After being appointed, Shautsou began to attack members of the LGBT community, referring to homosexuality as "perversion" and "psychological retardation". He also called on LGBT individuals to be "treated", a statement which drew condemnation from the Belarusian Helsinki Committee.

In June 2022, Shautsou visited Mariupol amidst the Russian siege of the city during the Russian invasion of Ukraine. Shautsou's appearance in the city, where he wore a military uniform bearing the Z symbol used by Russian pro-war authorities. He also met with Russian separatist officials during his visit. During his appearance, he admitted in an interview to Belarusian state television to involvement in child abductions in the Russo-Ukrainian War, claiming that the Belarus Red Cross "does everything to make children forget the horrors of war and relax and feel that there is an island of happiness."

Shautsou's remarks were met with intense criticism from the government of Ukraine, the Belarusian opposition, and the International Federation of Red Cross and Red Crescent Societies. Dmytro Kuleba urged the International Criminal Court to issue an arrest warrant against Shautsou, while Pavel Latushko, head of the National Anti-Crisis Management and deputy head of the United Transitional Cabinet called on the IFRC to remove the Belarusian Red Cross. The IFRC launched an investigation into the Belarusian Red Cross for breaches of the federation's principles and urged the group to express further independence from the governments of Belarus and Russia.

On 21 July 2023, Shautsou triggered further controversy by expressing his support for the deployment of nuclear weapons to Belarus, which led to further condemnation by the IFRC. The website of the Belarusian Red Cross was also hacked by the Belarusian hacktivist Cyber Partisans group, which revealed further documents about the BRC's involvement in child abductions.

On 4 October 2023 the IFRC completed its investigation, finding that Shautsou breached the organisation's guidelines, and called for him to be removed by 30 November 2023 under the threat of suspending the BRC's membership. After the BRC refused to take any action on removing Shautsou, the group was formally suspended on 1 December 2023. Shautsou condemned the organisation's suspension, calling it "absolutely politicised" and claiming that he was assisting the safe return of Ukrainian children.

On December 5, 2023, the United States Department of the Treasury’s Office of Foreign Assets Control has added Shautsou to its Specially Designated Nationals and Blocked Persons List.

In February 2024, the European Union announced the 13th round of sanctions on Russia, and he was included in the sanctions list. He was also blacklisted by Australia on the same day, by Switzerland in March and by New Zealand in September.

Following the 2024 election, Shautsou once again became a deputy of the House of Representatives of Belarus.

== Personal life ==
Shautsou is married to Natallia Shautsova, whom he met while studying at the Belarusian State Medical University. They have two sons, both of whom are adults. He lives in Minsk.
