= Sara Al-Saqqa =

Palestinian surgeon

- سارة السقا
- Born: c. 1992; Gaza Strip
- Education: Islamic University of Gaza; Queen Mary University
- Occupation: surgeon
- Employer: United Nations Office for the Coordination of Humanitarian Affairs (UNOCHA)
- Known for: first woman surgeon in Gaza

Sara Al-Saqqa (Arabic: سارة السقا, romanized: Sārah al-Saqqā; born c. 1992) is a Palestinian surgeon. She was the first woman surgeon in Gaza and she was recognised as a member of the BBC's 100 influential women in 2024. She became a de facto reporter on the Gazan medical effort during the humanitarian crisis involving a forced wave of Palestinian refugees in the armed conflict between Israel and Gaza in 2023 and 2024.

Her coverage of the day-to-day hospital events and the care for Palestinian victims, before and during the war escalation of October 2023, gave her significant media attention.

== Life ==
Al-Saqqa was born in the Gaza Strip in about 1992. She studied medicine at the Islamic University of Gaza and she then obtained a master's degree in laparoscopic surgery at Queen Mary University in London. After graduating, she began working at the Al-Shifa hospital and she became the first woman surgeon in the Gaza Strip. There she lived with the harsh sanitary conditions and the scarcity of resources resulting from the Israeli restrictions. Her work brought her a salary of $300 every forty days at a time when the UN estimated that a thousand more doctors were needed to meet the health emergency.

After the October 2023 attacks by Hamas and Israel's offensive air response there was a mass exodus of Palestinian civilians to northern Gaza. Al-Saqqa decided to remain at the hospital. She chose to continue both her medical work and her social media activity. She had used Instagram to spread news from Gaza. She began to report the Gazan emergency; the thousands of dead, the crisis in the management of the wounded and the destruction of a large part of the city.

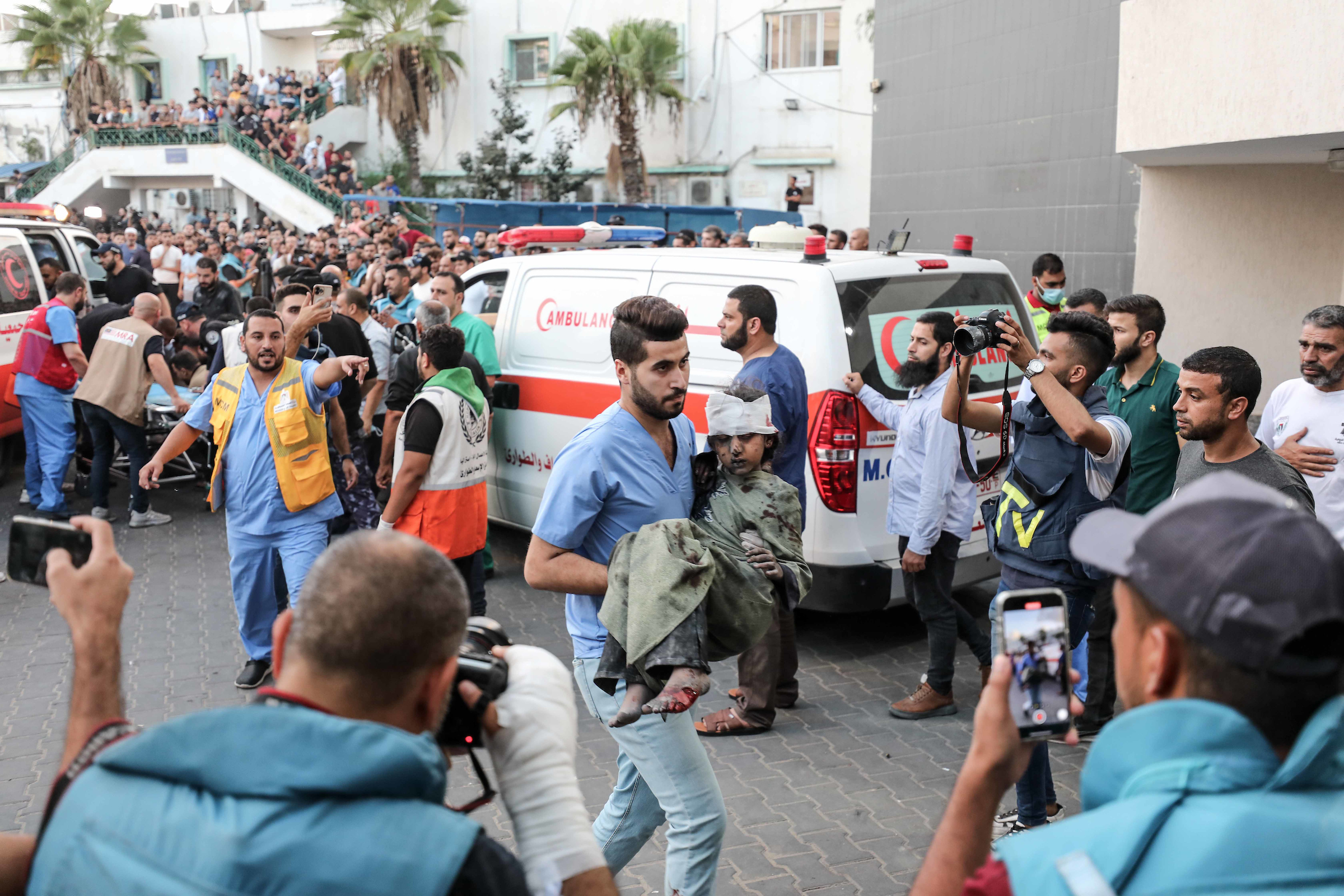
Injured child being carried into Al-Shifa Hospital in October 2023

Al-Saqqa chose to start recording injuries (including to babies and toddlers) in the hospital. These were possible evidence of war crimes that she thought could constitute crimes against humanity. The Israelis alleged that the hospital complex was a military operations center for Hamas. One of her colleagues, Dr. Ayman Abu al-Auf, and all of his family, died during the attacks. She said that she was most upset by the children that they were unable to help, she said she went into paediatrics never expecting "to feel so helpless in front of crying children".

She was chosen as one of the hundred most inspiring and influential women by the BBC's 100 Women in autumn 2023. After this, Al-Saqqa refused Israel's orders to evacuate civilians to northern Gaza and continued working in hospitals in the south of the Strip. Conditions became worse with cuts to telephone communications, the internet and to the electricity supply. The cuts added to the problems caused by the accumulation of hundreds of wounded in the hospital and the damaged facilities. The priority became reconverting the facilities into an emergency center where citizens could seek refuge from the bombings, Al-Saqqa assisted pregnant women as they gave birth after being rescued. The proximity of the artillery meant that in the beginning of 2024 she went to Rafah, in the south of Gaza, to continue practicing there as a surgeon near her family.

In February 2024 she reported on the Nasser Hospital siege.

In April 2024 the United Nations Office for the Coordination of Humanitarian Affairs (UNOCHA) noted that dead bodies were being removed from Al Shifa hospital. Their news release used a photo of Al-Saqqa (of their staff) when they made an urgent appeal for $2.3 billion so that they could help 3.1 million people in the West Bank, Gaza and west Jerusalem. Even with those funds UNOCHA noted that they needed to be sure that their workers were safe and that they had access to visas and communications.
