= Barnahus =

Model for responding to child violence

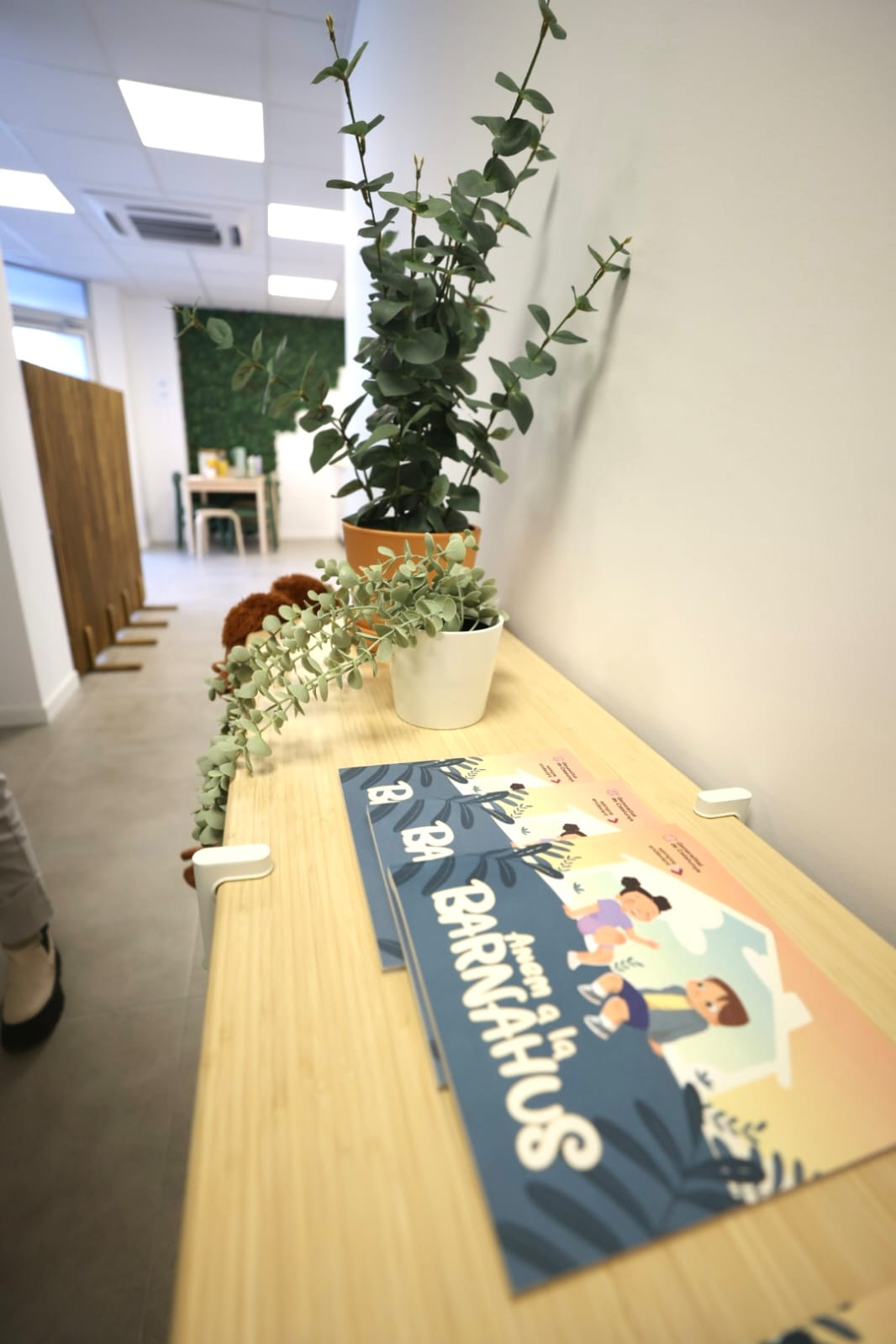
Interior of a Barnahus in Catalonia

Barnahus (derived from the Icelandic word for "children's house") is a child-friendly, multidisciplinary and interagency model for responding to child violence and witnesses of violence. The purpose of Barnahus is to offer each child a coordinated and effective child protection and criminal justice response, and to prevent traumatisation and retraumatisation during investigation and court proceedings.

The model is recognised by the Lanzarote Committee at the Council of Europe as a good practice example for child-friendly multidisciplinary responses, and has been the recipient of the Multidisciplinary Award from the International Society for the Prevention of Child Abuse and Neglect (IPSCAN). The model has the support of the UN Special Representative on Violence Against Children. The UN Committee on the Rights of the Child has noted with appreciation the legislative, institutional and policy measures taken to implement the Convention on the Rights of the Child, in particular the implementation of the Barnahus model in at least one party country. The EU Strategy on the rights of the child notes that “The promotion of integrated child protection systems is intrinsically linked to the prevention and protection from violence. With the child at the centre, all relevant authorities and services should work together to protect and support the child, in their best interests. The Commission will further support the establishment of Children’s houses (Barnahus) in the EU.“

While the local name may differ, the model as implemented in Europe has become widely known in English as Barnahus.

== History ==
=== Child Advocacy Centers in the United States ===
The Child Advocacy Center Model (CAC) was first set up in the US in 1985. The aim of the center was to prevent retraumatisation by providing a child-friendly, safe and neutral environment for forensic interviews, medical examination and treatment. Today there are more than 900 children's advocacy centers across the United States, housing multidisciplinary teams including law enforcement officers, child protection personnel, prosecutors, lawyers, advocates, mental health therapists and medical personnel, working together to minimize duplication and reduce trauma.

=== Barnahus Iceland ===
Iceland established Barnahús in 1998, which was inspired by the Children's Advocacy Centre Model and initiated by Bragi Guðbrandsson, the then director of the Government Child Protection Agency. Barnahús differed from the Children's Advocacy Center model in that its services were integrated into the national public welfare system and the judicial system. This provided a legal standing as a public organization financed by the regular budget of the national government. It also meant that instead of contributing to official child welfare and criminal justice procedures, the services at Barnahus are the official procedures. One such adaptation is providing that the child's audio visually recorded testimony at Barnahus is valid evidence for court proceedings, thereby eliminating the need for the child to wait many months or years to appear in court, all while respecting the rights of the defense.

Other considerations for the child-friendliness of the first Icelandic Barnahus were the specialization of staff and the physical environment. Starting with the environment, the service was established in home a residential neighborhood and was designed and furnished with the needs of children of all ages and abilities in mind. At this location, the child is interviewed by a highly trained investigative interviewer who specializes in meeting child victims of violence. In a nearby observation room, a multidisciplinary team watches the interview via the audio-visual recording system. The team includes the judge, a social worker, the police, the prosecution, the defense attorney and the child’s advocate. Because this team is present at the first interview, only one interview of the child is required to record their testimony and to have the essential information required for any child protection proceedings, as well as physical and mental health treatment and follow-up. After the interview the child may receive a non-invasive physical evaluation, and any evidence found will be recorded. Further assessments may happen all at the same place and on the same day.

This innovative and child friendly approach for providing official, coordinated, and parallel criminal and welfare proceedings to child victims of violence gathered increased interest around Europe and eventually inspired additional countries to adopt the model.

=== Nordics ===
The model then was adopted in other Nordic countries based on the Icelandic practice, first by Sweden (called barnahus in Swedish) in 2005, Norway (called barnehus in Norwegian) in 2007 and Denmark (called børnehus in Danish) in 2013. In total there are more than 50 Barnahus locations throughout the Nordics.

=== Europe ===
The adoption of the model by additional European countries has since accelerated, with approximately 20 countries being at least in the early stages of running a Barnahus.

== Definition ==
Barnahus is a place where a multidisciplinary and interagency team of law enforcement, criminal justice, child protective services, and medical and mental health workers cooperate to provide streamlined child protective services and child-friendly justice. Their work includes assessing the situation of the alleged child victim or witness of violence, and decide upon and then coordinating the services provided and any follow-up. This work is grounded in evidence-based practices, including forensic protocols, therapeutic interventions and medical examinations. Services are at no cost to children and their families.

=== Key criteria ===
Barnahus offers a child-friendly, safe environment for children, bringing together law enforcement, criminal justice, child protective services, and medical and mental health services at the same location according to the following criteria:

1. Forensic interviews of suspected child victims and witnesses of violence are carried out according to an evidence based protocol.
2. The evidentiary validity of the child's statement is ensured and is in line with the principles of due process. The child does not have repeat her/his statement during court proceedings if an indictment is made.
3. Medical evaluations are available for forensic investigative purposes, and fort the child's physical well-being and recovery.
4. Psychological support is available for and short and long term therapeutic services for trauma to the child and non-offending family members and caretakers.
5. An assessment of protection needs of the victim and potential siblings in the family is made and followed-up on.

=== Target group ===
The Barnahus target group includes all children who are victims and/or witnesses of crime involving all forms of violence. Child is defined according to article 19 of UN Convention on the Rights of the child as, "every human being below the age of eighteen years unless under the law applicable to the child, majority is attained earlier." Forms of violence include but are not limited to physical and mental abuse, domestic violence, sexual abuse and exploitation, commercial exploitation, trafficking, genital mutilation and crime with honour motives.

Non-offending family/care-givers are included as a secondary target group.

It is common that Barnahus when they are first starting up focus on a smaller target group, such as child sexual abuse cases.

=== Child-friendly environment ===
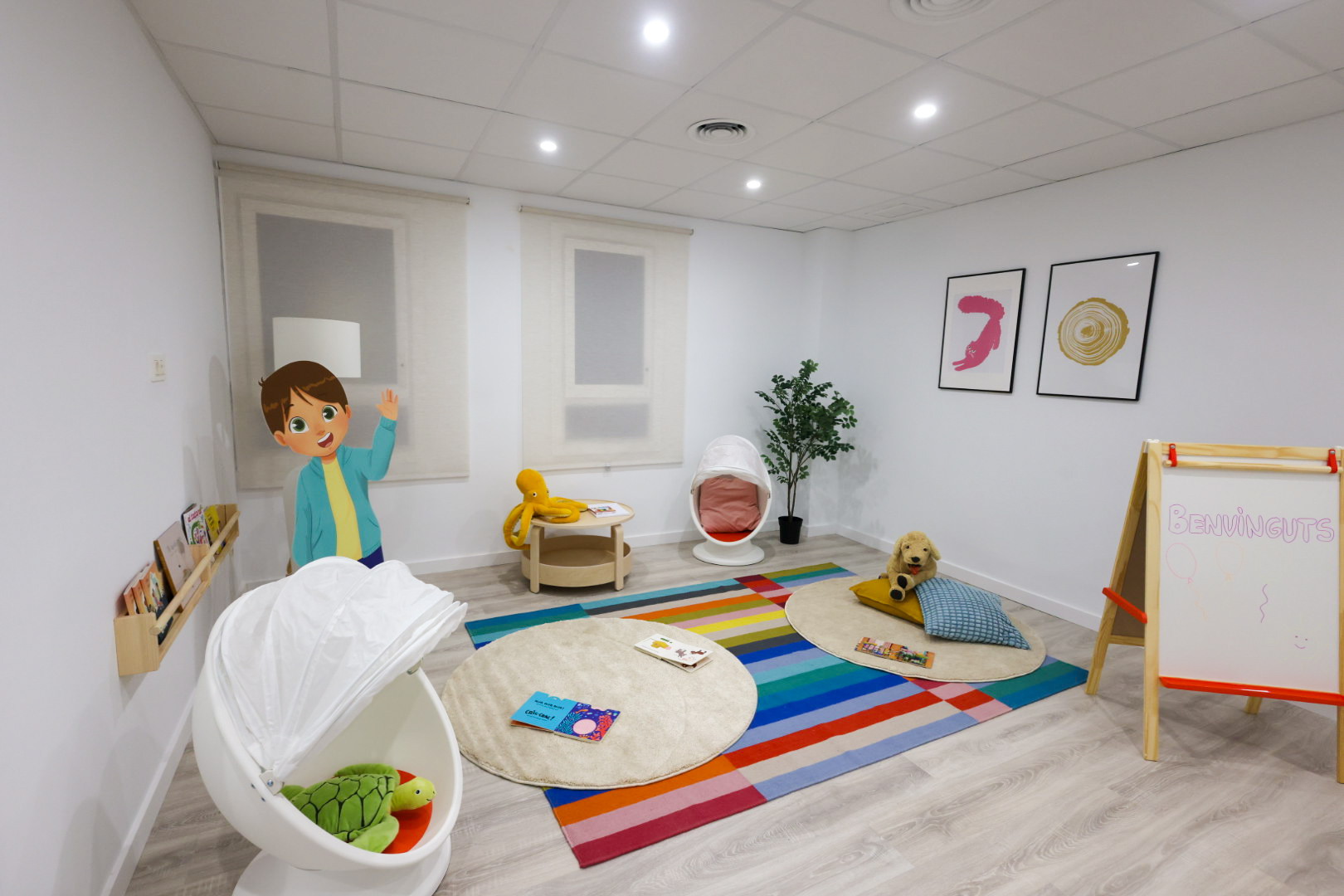
A comfortable, child-friendly environment in a Catalan barnahus

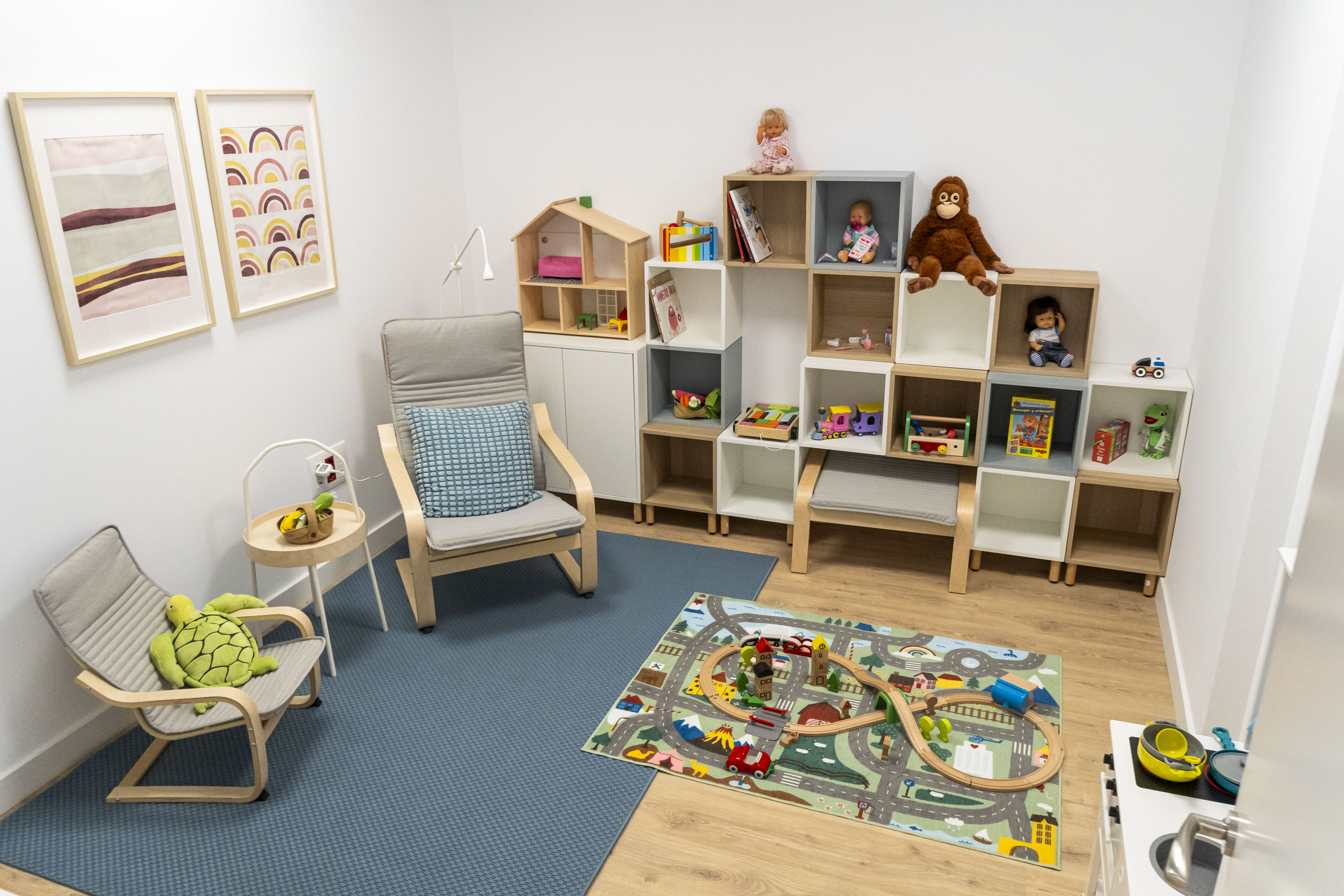
Another child-friendly space

The child-friendly environment of Barnahus reduces the level of anxiety of the child which supports the child to tell everything that has happened and to be an active participant in the process. That children are supported to tell everything that has happened is especially important because in many cases the child's story is the only or strongest evidence available.

Common child-friendly environmental factors include establishing Barnahus in house in a residential neighbourhood, such as the Barnahus in Reykjavik, Iceland. This is opposed to being established in a courthouse, police station, or hospital, which can be intimidating locations for children. It can also lead to the child believing that they have criminal responsibility for what has happened, something their abuser might have told them would happen. In the case of going to a hospital, it might increase their fears that their body has been permanently harmed.

In addition to location, Barnahus interiors are designed to maximize the child's comfort with age appropriate toys, pictures and furnishings. Rooms are soundproof and the building provides safety and privacy. The alleged offender never comes to Barnahus or, if such services are co-located, steps are taken to eliminate the possibility of contact between the alleged offender and victim.

=== The child's disclosure ===
The investigative interview at Barnahus which elicits the child's testimony is the central event at Barnahus. This is in part because it gives many professionals the core information they need to provide services to the child, and in part because often the most substantial or even the only evidence available is the story from the child. Moreover, as a result of the interview, the testimony is used to identify and investigate child abuse for criminal, child protection, and therapeutic purposes.

To elicit the child's disclosure, a forensic or investigative interview and a medical examination of the child will take place. The child is interviewed using an evidence based protocol, such as the NICHD or NCAC protocol, or following the ABE guidance. The interviewer adapts to the needs of the child, including age, level of development, cultural background, abilities, and type of suspected violence.

A multidisciplinary team observes the interview from a nearby room. Exactly who is involved differs slightly from country to country. Using the example of Iceland, the interview is observed by a judge. The team may request that the judge ask the interviewer to ask certain questions. It is the judge who decides if the question is appropriate and necessary for the case, and the interviewer, who in Iceland is a clinical psychologist, formulates the question in an appropriate way for the child and according to the evidence-based protocol.

Following the interview, the police will investigate the situation around the alleged criminal offence and the prosecutor, judge and the lawyer of the accused will be involved. The need for short-term and long term therapeutic and family support will also be assessed and provided either at Barnahus or through referrals. Same with medical and even dental services.

Often only one interview is needed. However, sometimes more than one interview is performed, but no more than is absolutely necessary. This may be done either to safeguard equality of arms and due process, or because disclosure is a process and the child has become ready to tell more of the story.

=== Due process and rights of the defence ===
The European Convention of Human Rights in article 6.3d provides the right of the defence to cross-examine a witness. The ECHR contains no absolute requirement to hear a child in court if the process by which the testimony has been taken in the pretrial investigation respects the rights of the defendant to a fair trial.

At Barnahus, the defence has the opportunity to pose questions to the child victim/witness via a forensic interviewer. If the accused has legal right to observe the child's testimony, this is done by audio-visual transmission to avoid potential contact between the accused and the child. The defence lawyer is offered an opportunity to pose question to the child after the first interview, for example through a second interview of the child. The number of interviews is limited to the absolute minimum necessary for the criminal investigation.

Some Barnahus are able to provide cross examination, for example through pre-recorded interviews or via live streaming to courts.

=== Coordinated process ===
From before the child comes to Barnahus through to any follow-up stages, the multidisciplinary team regularly meets to share information about the case in order protect the child from the traumatisation or retraumatisation from having to tell the story of their abuse many times. One or more staff members coordinates this work. This collaboration is established through interagency and other agreements which clarify the roles and responsibilities of all the professionals involved. A steering committee with representatives from all agencies oversees the implementation of the formal foundational agreements.

After the forensic interview, the child receives a non-invasive medical examination, the exact format of which depends on the needs of the case and could include top-to-toe, non-penetrative gynecological, forensic, and dental. Children who need additional medical services may be seen at Barnahus or referred to nearby services. Children often report that meeting with a doctor to learn that their bodies are OK is a relief, and professionals report that it is an important part of the psychological healing process.

The police investigate the situation around the alleged criminal offence and the prosecutor, judge and the lawyer of the accused are involved.

The need for short-term and long term therapeutic and family support is assessed and provided either at Barnahus or through referrals.

The result is that children are able to get all the support they need to recover from any violence that has happened to them, and to return to a healthy and happy childhood as soon as possible.

=== Embedded in the national system ===
This collaboration is embedded in the national or local child welfare and criminal systems, and has formal recognition from the judicial systems. This provides a legal standing as a public organisation financed with public funds. It also provides for parallel and coordinated criminal and welfare procedures. As a result, it means that instead of contributing to official child welfare and criminal justice procedures, the services at Barnahus are the official procedures. As an example, the child's audio visually recorded forensic interview at Barnahus is valid evidence for court proceedings, thereby eliminating the need for the child to wait many months or years to appear in court, all while respecting the rights of the defence. This setup has been confirmed by the European Court of Human Rights to in Case nr. 34209/96 be in line with the European Convention on Human Rights.

=== Under one roof ===
Barnahus services are provided at the same location because a key principle of the Barnahus model is putting the child in the centre of the services. This means that the services bend to the child's needs, not the other way around. Part of this child-centred approach is the progressive integration of the different working methods of the professions represented in Barnahus. Through working at the same place, staff members gradually get more insight about each other's work culture, and become aligned on their mission. This can lead to improved shared working methods and mutual support for updated policies and laws. Additional benefits include flexibility in being able to help children. For example, a child could start off an appointment refusing to be seen by a doctor, but once given time to feel comfortable with the staff and the location, could change their mind and then be seen immediately.

=== Adaptations ===
While Barnahus is named as a model, each Barnahus is adapted according to the contexts in which they operate, including legal systems, social structures, cultural traditions and professional practices. The PROMISE Barnahus Quality Standards establishes guidelines and limits for these adaptations in order for any given service to be considered a Barnahus.

== Relevant laws and guidance ==
=== International ===
- UN Convention on the Rights of the Child
  - Best interests - Article 3 establishes the best interest of the child as a general principle and a rule of procedure. At Barnahus, according to PROMISE Barnahus Quality Standard 1.1, the best interests of the child are a primary consideration in all actions and decisions concerning the child and the non-offending family/caregivers/support persons.
  - Right to be heard and receive information - Article 2 states that a child should in particular be provided with the opportunity to be heard in any judicial and administrative proceedings affecting the child.
  - Non-discrimination - is a general principle of the UNCRC set out in article 2 and is an essential principle for the implementation of article 19 on children's right to freedom from violence.
- UN Committee on the Rights of the Child General Comment no 1354
  - Undue delay - In this General Comment, the Committee states that effective help requires that actions, once decided through a participatory process, must not be subject to undue delay.
- Optional Protocol to the UN CRC on the Sale of Children
- UN Protocol to Prevent, Suppress and Punish Trafficking in Persons, Especially Women and Children

=== European ===
- Council of Europe Guidelines of the Committee of Ministers of the Council of Europe on child-friendly justice and their explanatory memorandum 2011
  - Child-friendly justice - refers to justice systems which guarantee the respect the effective implementation of all children's rights at the highest attainable level.
- Council of Europe Convention on the Protection of Children against Sexual Exploitation and Sexual Abuse (Lanzarote Convention)
- European Convention of Human Rights
- EU Child Sexual Abuse & Exploitation Directive
- EU Victims’ Rights Directive
- EU Anti-Trafficking Directive
- Council of Europe Convention on Trafficking
- European Protection Order

=== Key legal obligations on assistance, protection and procedural safeguards ===
The laws and guidance listed above, in combination with national law and policy, elaborate the following legal obligations that Barnahus responds to:

- Avoiding repeat or secondary victimisation of victims
- Ensuring the best interests is a primary consideration
- Non-discrimination
- Taking due account of the views of the child
- Identifying child victims
- Assistance and support to the victims
- Provision of information
- Right to interpretation & translation
- Individual assessment of each child’s circumstances and non-offending family members’ needs
- Safeguards relating to abuses within the “circle of trust”
- Representation where appropriate for children deprived of parental care or where their interests conflict with those of their parents
- Legal counselling and representation
- Reporting obligations
- Initiation of criminal proceedings
- Adapted procedures in investigations and judicial proceedings involving children
- No unjustified delay between the reporting of the facts and interviews take place
- Provision for medical examinations
- Interviews take place, where necessary, in premises designed or adapted for this purpose
- Interviews are carried out by or through professionals trained for this purpose
- The same persons, if possible and where appropriate, conduct all interviews with children
- Considerations as to the gender of professionals involved in interviews in cases of sexual violence et al
- The number of interviews is as limited as possible and interviews are carried out only where strictly necessary and for the purpose of the investigations and proceedings
- Accompaniment by legal representative or where appropriate by an adult of his or her choice unless a reasoned decision has been made to the contrary in respect of that person.
- All interviews with a child victim or where appropriate a child witness, may be audio-visually recorded and that such recordings may be used as evidence in criminal court proceedings
- Possibility to order that the hearing take place without the presence of the public
- Possibility to order that the child victim be heard through the use of appropriate communication technologies
- Necessary measures to protect the privacy, identity and image of child victims and to prevent the public dissemination of any information that could lead to their identification.
- Right to avoid contact between victim and offender
- Necessary measures to find durable solutions for trafficked children
- Training & tools
- Multi-disciplinary/coordination/cooperation
- Data & monitoring
- Awareness Raising/ Prevention
- Other (compensation, non prosecution & non punishment)

== International support ==
Many international actors are providing funding and other formats of support to national actors working to bring Barnahus to their countries, including but not limited to (alphabetically):

- Barnahus Network
- Council of Europe
- Council of the Baltic Sea States
- ECPAT International including country offices
- EEA and Norway Grants
- Estonian development cooperation
- European Commission
- Europol
- Oak Foundation
- Organisation for Economic Co-operation and Development (OECD)
- Save the children including country offices
- Swedish International Development Cooperation Agency
- Terre des Hommes including country offices
- World Childhood Foundation including country offices
- UNICEF including country offices
- World Health Organization
- World Vision

== See also ==
- Violence against children
- Child sexual abuse
- Child online sexual abuse
