= Save Ukraine =

Ukrainian charitable organization

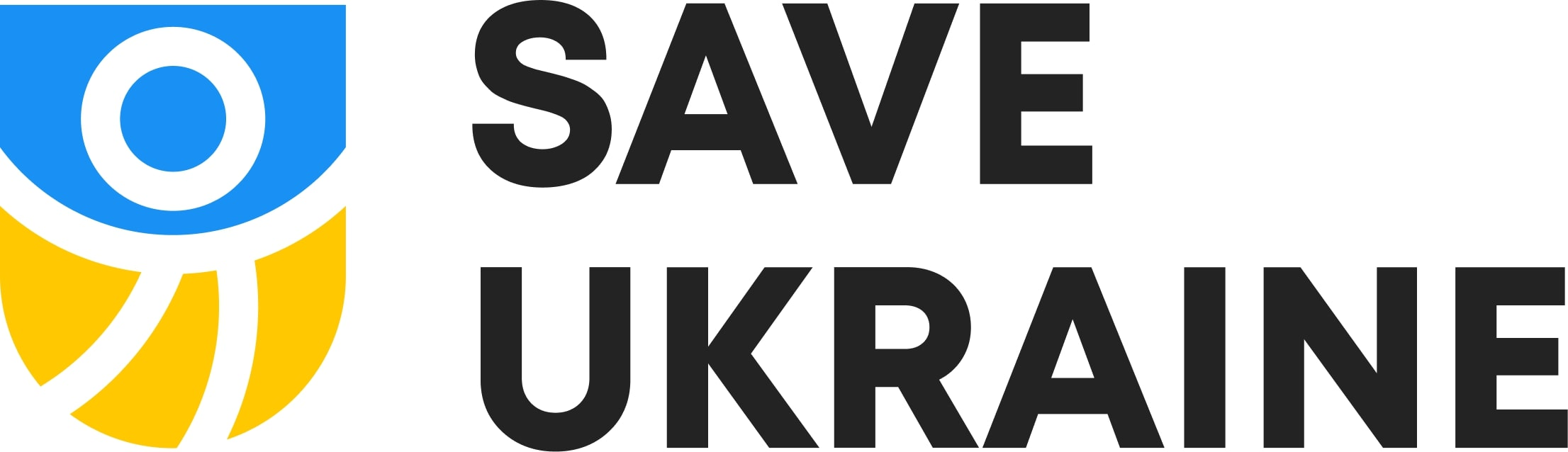
- Type: Charitable organization
- Founded: 2014
- Founder: Mykola Kuleba
- Headquarters: Kyiv, Ukraine
- Website: www.saveukraineua.org

Save Ukraine is a Ukrainian charitable organization established in 2014 to support vulnerable groups including orphans, children from orphanages, family-type orphanages, families with children, children with disabilities, children returned from temporarily occupied territories and Russia, pregnant women, families of fallen soldiers, the elderly, and internally displaced persons. Since the onset of the full-scale invasion in 2022, the organization has been instrumental in rescuing and rehabilitating displaced persons and abducted children. Save Ukraine was founded by Mykola Kuleba.

== Overview ==
Save Ukraine operates the largest network for the rescue of children from TOT and Russia, often at the request of government agencies. Since 2014 more than 160,000 people been rescued. Between February 2022 and January 2025, the organization returned 565 children, comprising 55% of the 1,032 children recovered from TOT and Russia. Save Ukraine has documented testimonies from returned children, highlighting indoctrination, identity deprivation, and information concealment, which serve as evidence for the International Criminal Court and raise global awareness.

The organization is led by Mykola Kuleba, its head and co-founder. Save Ukraine has been recognized by Forbes Ukraine as one of the 50 largest charitable foundations in the country.

== Key activities ==
=== Evacuation and relief ===
Since its establishment, Save Ukraine has prioritized the evacuation of people from frontline areas and war zones. Between 2014 and 2016, the organization evacuated 55,000 individuals, and since 2022, more than 108,000 people have been rescued. The UN Refugee Agency includes Save Ukraine among its key partners in the shelter and non-food items cluster.

=== Humanitarian aid ===
Save Ukraine provides temporary housing, humanitarian assistance, and rehabilitation services. It operates transit hubs, social services, and support centers for internally displaced persons (IDPs) across Ukraine. Centers of Hope and Recovery offer comprehensive support, including psychological, legal, and educational services for families and children.

=== Advocacy and partnerships ===
Save Ukraine collaborates with Ukrainian governmental bodies, such as the Office of the President and the Ukrainian Parliament Commissioner, and participates in the Presidential Initiative Bring Kids Back UA. Internationally, it works with organizations and authorities across five continents, including the UN, European Parliament, and World Economic Forum. Mykola Kuleba has represented Save Ukraine in prominent international forums like the US Congress and the UN Security Council

=== Rehabilitation and reintegration ===
Save Ukraine emphasizes long-term community integration. Projects like Fort Home and Back to School provide housing and educational resources to IDPs. The organization has also opened rehabilitation centers, including one for children with disabilities in Irpin, and launched social services such as day care centers and social taxis.

=== Child rescue operations ===
Save Ukraine's rescue teams specialize in retrieving children abducted or displaced to Russia and TOT. These operations involve armored vehicles and trained personnel due to the high-risk environment. By January 2025, Save Ukraine had successfully returned 565 abducted children. Detailed documentation of these rescues is submitted to international judicial bodies as evidence of war crimes.

== Historical milestones ==
=== Founding and early years (2014–2022) ===
Save Ukraine began as an association of volunteers evacuating civilians from Donbas in 2014. The organization conducted its first evacuation operation on May 11, 2014, transporting children from an orphanage in Sloviansk. In January 2015, it was formally established as a charitable organization. Early efforts focused on evacuating orphanages and fostering family reunification, later expanding to all vulnerable populations.

By mid-2016, Save Ukraine had evacuated 55,000 people, coordinated aid for over 120 frontline settlements, and created a network of support centers for IDPs, including 60 social canteens.

=== Activities during the full-scale invasion (2022–present) ===
Following Russia's full-scale invasion in 2022, Save Ukraine expanded its operations, rescuing over 108,000 individuals and setting up transit hubs and social services nationwide. It has evacuated 41,000 children and adults from war zones, including 1,200 orphans from 22 orphanages.

The organization's hotline and chatbot, launched in March 2022, provide evacuation advice and psychological support, assisting an average of 300 people daily as of early 2025. Save Ukraine has also responded to man-made disasters, such as the evacuation efforts following the destruction of the Kakhovka reservoir dam.

== International cooperation ==
Save Ukraine's partnerships span organizations like the International Committee of the Red Cross, UNICEF, OSCE, and the European Commission. It is a member of the International Coalition for the Return of Ukrainian Children and collaborates with over 40 countries. Its leaders actively engage in global advocacy, emphasizing the plight of displaced and abducted children.

== Vision and mission ==
Save Ukraine's mission centers on creating a safe and inclusive environment for children and families, fostering a culture of community belonging and respect for children's rights. The organization's holistic approach aims to rebuild lives while preserving and strengthening family units.

== Documenting war crimes ==
The organization meticulously records evidence of crimes committed against Ukrainian children, including indoctrination and concealment of their identities. These efforts contribute to international legal proceedings and advocacy.

== Notable achievements ==
- Rescued 565 children from TOT and Russia since 2022.
- Evacuated over 160,000 individuals from war zones.
- Recognized by Forbes Ukraine as one of the 50 largest charitable foundations.
- Partnered with the UN Refugee Agency and other global organizations.
- Established numerous support centers and rehabilitation facilities nationwide.
- Save Ukraine continues to lead efforts in humanitarian relief, advocacy, and the protection of children's rights amid the ongoing conflict.

== Awards and Recognition ==
Save Ukraine has been recognised by The Last Girl Awards (2023), Manhae Peace Prize (2023), International Four Freedoms Award (2024), and The OXI Day Award (2024).

== See also ==
- Bring Kids Back UA - A plan initiated by President Zelenskyy to bring home all Ukrainian child deported and forcibly transferred by Russia.
