= Child abductions in the Russo-Ukrainian war =

Forced Russian adoption of Ukrainian children

- Part of the Russo-Ukrainian war and war crimes in the Russian invasion of Ukraine
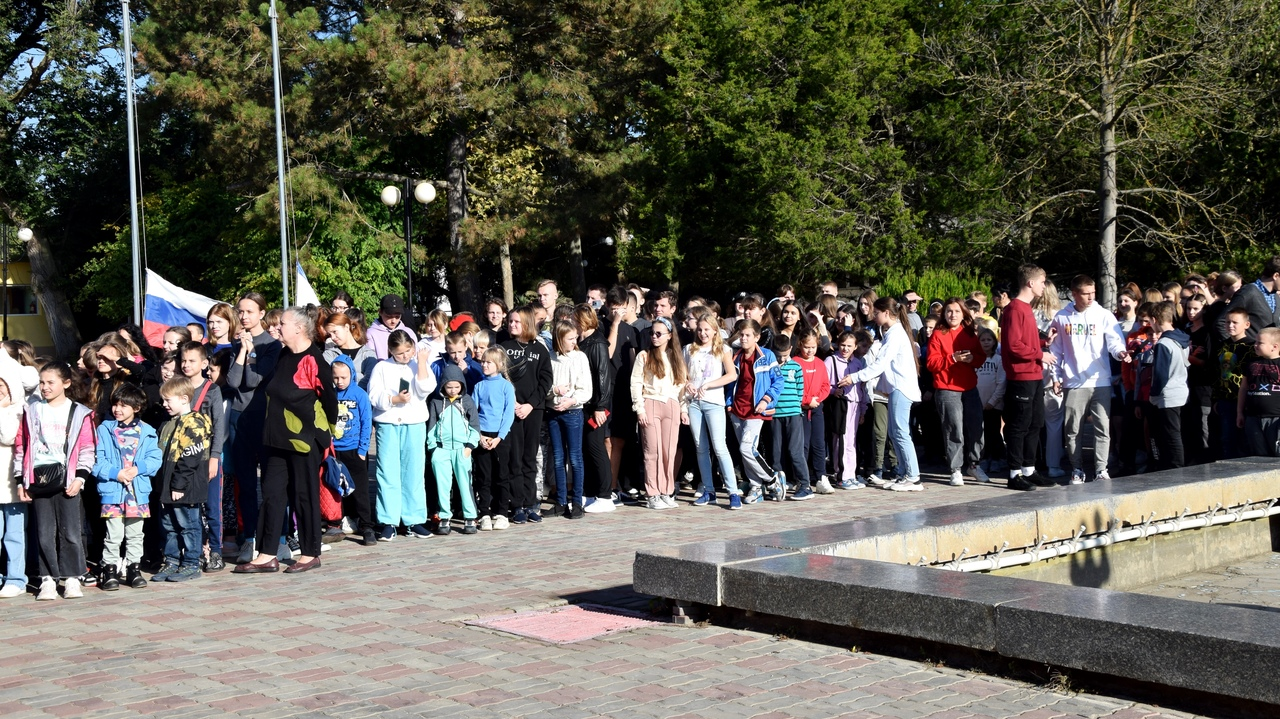
- 1,500 Ukrainian children from Kherson and Zaporizhzhia oblasts at Yevpatoria, Russian-occupied Crimea, October 2022
- Location: Russian-occupied territories of Ukraine
- Date: 2014 – present
- Target: Ukrainian children
- Attack type: Deportation; forced displacement; population transfer; Russification; war crime; crimes against humanity
- Deaths: 765
- Injuries: 1,867
- Victims: 20,651 – 307,000 (as of August 2022); 700,000 (as of July 2023)
- Perpetrators: Vladimir Putin; Maria Lvova-Belova
- Litigation: International Criminal Court arrest warrants for Putin and Lvova-Belova

During the Russo-Ukrainian war, Russia has forcibly transferred almost 20,000 Ukrainian children to areas under its control, assigned them Russian citizenship, forcibly adopted them into Russian families, and created obstacles for their reunification with their parents and homeland. The International Criminal Court (ICC) has issued arrest warrants for President of Russia Vladimir Putin (who has explicitly supported the forced adoptions, including by enacting legislation to facilitate them) and Children's Rights Commissioner Maria Lvova-Belova for their alleged involvement. According to international law, including the 1948 Genocide Convention, such acts constitute genocide if done with intent to destroy, in whole or in part, a nation or ethnic group. (Note: Article II. In the present Convention, genocide means any of the following acts committed with intent to destroy, in whole or in part, a national, ethnical, racial or religious group, as such: ... (e) Forcibly transferring children of the group to another group.)

Ukrainian children have been abducted by the Russian state after their parents had been arrested by Russian occupation authorities or killed in the invasion, or after becoming separated from their parents in an active war zone. Children have also been abducted from Ukrainian state institutions in occupied areas, and through children's "summer camps" on Russian territory. The abducted children have been subject to Russification; raising children of war in a foreign nation and culture may constitute an act of genocide if intended to erase their national identity.

Ukrainian authorities have verified the identities of over 19,000 abducted children, compiling and actively updating the data as part of an online platform: "Children of War". Russian authorities have claimed that over 700,000 Ukrainian children have been transferred by mid-2023, and Ukraine's ombudsman on children's rights believes that the actual number of abducted children may be in the hundreds of thousands. A charitable organisation, Save Ukraine, facilitates the repatriation and family reunification of abducted Ukrainian children.

In August 2025, Russian occupation authorities in Ukraine created an internet based catalogue where Russians can choose Ukrainian children based on photos and descriptions like "obedient" or "calm", and filtering by age, eye color and hair color. A UN inquiry found that Russian forces had carried out war crimes and crimes against humanity, consisting of forcible transfer, deportation and enforced disappearance.

== History ==
=== 2010s ===
Russia started transferring children from Ukrainian territories in 2014, the first year of the Russo-Ukrainian war. The first such large-scale program was initiated by Russian charity celebrity Elizaveta Glinka. In early February 2022, Russia "evacuated" 500 supposed orphans from Donetsk Oblast to Russian territory.

=== 2022 ===
The first reports of forced deportations to Russia as part of the Russian invasion of Ukraine came mid-March 2022, during the siege of Mariupol. The same month, Russian children's rights commissioner Maria Lvova-Belova has stated that a group of Ukrainian children transferred to Russia from Mariupol had initially asserted their Ukrainian identity, but that it had since transformed into a love for Russia, saying that she had adopted one of the children herself.

Map of the February 2022 Russian invasion of Ukraine

On 22 March, Ukraine and U.S. authorities claimed more than 2,300 children had been kidnapped by Russian forces from the Donetsk and Luhansk Oblasts.

On 30 May, Vladimir Putin signed a decree that streamlined the process of adopting Ukrainian orphans or those without parental care and giving them Russian citizenship.

By 11 April, two-thirds of Ukraine's 7.5 million children had been displaced according to the U.N. Ukraine's human rights commissioner, Lyudmila Denysova, and U.N. ambassador Sergiy Kyslytsya, stated at that time that more than 120,000 children had been deported to Russia. By 26 May, more than 238,000 Ukrainian children were reported to have been deported to Russian territory.

Ukraine raised the issue at a meeting of the Organization for Security and Co-operation in Europe (OSCE) in early June, where the head of Ukraine's mission, Yevhenii Tsymbaliuk, quoted a message from a Ukrainian child who had been forcibly adopted despite having close living relations; addressed to his aunt, it read, in part, "They say I'm an orphan. But I'm not an orphan, I have you, I have grandparents. There are so many children like me here. They say they want to leave us in Russia. And I don't want to stay in Russia!"

According to Ukrainska Pravda, Russia has taken 267 orphans from Mariupol to Rostov to be made Russian citizens, supervised by Maria Lvova-Belova. It also reported that Russian authorities had looked for and collected orphaned children, to be taken to an unknown destination.

Sky News released CCTV footage dated June of Russian FSB officials entering an orphanage in Kherson to search for orphans. Aware of the risk of child abductions, the staff hid the children prior to their arrival. Finding the orphanage empty, the FSB agents seized records, computers, and the CCTV system from the orphanage in an apparent effort to track down the missing children. Russian authorities subsequently sent 15 abducted children to be housed in the orphanage, only to be taken away by the Russian occupiers as they retreated from Kherson. Russian forces also successfully abducted children from a different Kherson orphanage, an eyewitness told Sky News.

In June, Mikhail Mizintsev, head of the National Defense Management Center, claimed 1,936,911 Ukrainians had been deported to Russia, of whom 307,423 were children.

On 7 September a United Nations official reported that there were credible accusations that Russian forces had sent Ukrainian children to Russia for adoption as part of a forced deportation programme, and the US ambassador informed the UN Security Council that more than 1,800 Ukrainian children had been transferred to Russia in July alone.

Child abduction during "filtration" procedures was documented in a 10 November Amnesty International report entitled "Russia’s Unlawful Transfer And Abuse Of Civilians In Ukraine During 'Filtration'". An 11-year-old boy testified to Amnesty International:

They took my mom to another tent. She was being questioned... They told me I was going to be taken away from my mom... I was shocked... They didn’t say anything about where my mom was going. A lady from Novoazovsk [child protection] service said maybe my mom would be let go... I didn’t get to see my mom... I have not heard from her since.

In December, a report published by the Eastern Human Rights Group and the Institute for Strategic Research and Security concluded that the deportations in Donbas were prepared by the Russian Federation under the guise of "evacuation" ahead of time.

=== 2023 ===
As early as 28 April 2023 the abductions were a matter of interest at the UNSC.

According to an August Reuters report, Alexei Petrov, an aide to the office of Russia's presidential commissioner for children's rights, had employed neo-Nazi rhetoric and symbols in his online activity, and associated himself with neo-Nazi, white supremacist, and Russian far-right movements online.

=== 2024 ===
On 2 February 2024 the International Coalition for the Return of Ukrainian Children launched itself with 37 partner nations. It was co-chaired by Ukraine and Canada.

In February NPR interviewed two formerly kidnapped children after they had been heard by the House Foreign Affairs Committee. Later during the 118th United States Congress, Rep Susan Wild proposed H.Res 149: "Condemning the illegal abduction and forcible transfer of children from Ukraine to the Russian Federation"; it earned 39 co-sponsors. The House agreed to the resolution on March 19, 2024, passing it by a vote of 390 to 9. The members voting against the resolution were: Marjorie Taylor Greene, Tom Tiffany, Eric Burlison, Andy Biggs, Clay Higgins, Thomas Massie, Matt Rosendale, Warren Davidson, and Chip Roy.

In June Ukrainians became aware that Russia had placed photographs of several of the abductees in an online format.

=== 2025 ===
In October 2025 it was announced by United States First Lady Melania Trump that due to ongoing talks with Putin she had assisted in the reunification of eight children that had been "displaced". Per Trump, three of the eight children had been separated from their families and "displaced" into Russia due to front line fighting, while the remainder were separated from family members across borders due to the fighting.

== Abductions ==
The vast majority of the abducted children have been abducted from southern and eastern Ukraine (Kherson, Kharkiv, Zaporizhzhia, Donetsk, Luhansk and Mykolaiv regions). According to Ukraine's ombudsman on children's rights, Russia is carrying out the abductions with the goal of supplementing its own population, and that Russia is conducting health examinations on the children in order to integrate only healthy Ukrainian children into the Russian nation.

=== Parental separation ===
Some children have been abducted after becoming separated from their parents while fleeing active war zones, and some have been abducted after their parents were detained in filtration camps. Some children have been abducted and taken to Russia by family friends or relatives seeking financial and material gain from incentives instituted by the Russian state intended to promote adoption of Ukrainian children by Russian families. Ukraine's ombudsman on children's rights has alleged that Russian occupation authorities have used abductions as a punitive measure against parents who disobey occupation authorities, revoking their parental rights as punishment for dissent. Some children are abducted by Russian authorities after their parents are killed by Russian forces, Ukrainian officials have said.

=== State institutions ===
Children have been abducted from Ukrainian state-run institutions such as orphanages, group homes, care homes, hospitals, and boarding schools; many of the forcibly transferred children were taken from orphanages and group homes. State institutions furthermore lost track of thousands of children in their care amid the turmoil of the war.

Most children in the care of Ukrainian state institutions (including some of those in orphanages) are not orphans but were only temporarily or permanently placed under the care of the state by parents facing personal hardships such as poverty, illness, or addiction. The Ukrainian state facilitates the voluntary temporary or permanent placement of children under the care of state institutions by parents. Some 90% of Ukrainian children living under state care were thus "social orphans" – children with family members who are for various reasons unable to care for them. The United Nations estimated that some 90,000 children resided in state-run homes in Ukraine prior to the 2022 invasion. Regardless of whether the children had living parents or were indeed wards of the state, such forced transfers during wartime likely constitute a war crime.

The BBC said that many of the abducted children were sent to "re-education camps or psychiatric hospitals" in Russia. The Yale School of Public Health has documented a “systematic” effort to brainwash the Ukrainian children.

=== Summer camp stays ===
Parents in Russian-occupied areas have been encouraged by Russian occupation authorities, Russian forces, and teachers to send their children to so-called "summer camps" (in fact re-education camps for Ukrainian children) for a respite from the Russo-Ukrainian war. Some parents were pressured to allow their children to go to the camps, while others agreed in order to get their children out of an active war zone, or to take advantage of an opportunity to provide them a free trip (many families that agreed to send their children were economically disadvantaged) or better living conditions amid the ravages of war.

Some of these children have been subsequently detained in the camps indefinitely, while others were returned weeks or months later than promised. Some parents who sent their children to the "summer camps" were subsequently told that their children would be returned only if their parents pick them up in person, but travel between Ukraine and Russia is difficult, dangerous and expensive, some camps are located far from Ukraine (including as far as Magadan Oblast in the Russian Far East, which abuts the Pacific coast), and many children are from low-income families that cannot afford the journey (some had to sell their belongings to afford the journey and travel through four countries to collect their children from the camps); even relatives granted power of attorney by parents are not allowed to collect the children, and all men (including parents) of ages between 18 and 60 are forbidden from leaving Ukraine as they are eligible for conscription and additionally risk "filtration" and possible persecution when attempting to enter Russia, so that in practice, in most cases only the mothers are able to retrieve the children. In some instances, camp officials said that the return of children was dependent upon Russia recapturing since liberated Ukrainian territory where the child's family lives, and one child was told that he would not be returned home due to his "pro-Ukrainian views". Some children said they were told they would be given up for adoption or placed into foster homes if their parents did not come to collect them soon. Some children were retrieved through intervention by the Ukrainian government. Parents' ability to communicate with their children during their stay in the camps has been curtailed, and parents have been denied information about their child's status.

== Maltreatment ==
According to witness testimonies obtained by the United Nations Commission of Inquiry on Ukraine, some of the children have experienced poor living conditions, inadequate care, and verbal abuse while living under the custody of the Russian state. Some returned children have attested to harsh punishments and restrictive living conditions while in Russia. The Ukrainian government has claimed that some children have experienced sexual exploitation after being forcibly transferred to Russia. Children detained in summer camps have testified to frequent punishment, bullying by peers, and pressure to sing the Russian anthem.

Abducted children are offered a three-month-long rehabilitation with mental health care teams upon returning to Ukraine.

== Russian policies ==
=== Adoptions ===
Russian law prohibits adoptions of children who are citizens of other countries by Russian citizens without the consent of the child's home country. In May 2022, Vladimir Putin signed a decree facilitating the granting of Russian citizenship to Ukrainian children to enable their permanent adoption into Russian families - this change represents a legal obstacle to future reunification of the abducted children with their Ukrainian families or their repatriation to Ukraine. Orphanages, group homes, and social service agencies are also allowed to file for adoption of abducted children, thus initiating their naturalisation.

The Russian government created a register of Russian families that may adopt Ukrainian children, and a hotline for Russian families seeking to adopt Ukrainian children from Donbas. Adoptive families receive a cash payment for each adopted Ukrainian child that is granted Russian citizenship. Lvova-Belova suggested the creation of a database of Ukrainian (ostensible) orphans to improve matching of these children with prospective adoptive families in occupied Ukraine or Russia, and expressed a wish to systematise the adoption process.

BBC news reported that Sergey Mironov, a Putin ally, had illegally adopted a toddler from a children's home in Ukraine.

=== Russification and re-education ===
According to The New York Times, "Russian officials ... made clear that their goal is to replace any childhood attachment to home with a love for Russia". Upon arriving in Russia, the children are placed in homes and subjected to re-education. During the occupation of Novopskov, occupation authorities threatened to deprive parents of parental rights if their child did not attend a school with a Russian curriculum.

In 2022, the Russian government established a large-scale system of at least 43 children's camps in Russia and Crimea (most of which previously served as children's summer resorts) the main purpose of which appears to be "integrating children from Ukraine into the Russian government's vision of national culture, history, and society", according to a report by Yale School of Public Health's Humanitarian Research Lab. Some children have been placed in summer camps in Belarus that are run by Belarusian state-owned corporations by virtue of a decree issued by the Russo-Belarusian Union State. Children in such camps have been subjected to Russification, Russian state propaganda, and military education (including firearm training). Children have also been provided with formal education in accordance with Russia's educational standards (either at the camps or at local schools) in an effort to steer them towards attending university in Russia.

Parents in Russian-occupied areas are encouraged or coerced to send their children to these camps (described to them as children's "summer camps") for a respite from the war, with the children subsequently subject to indoctrination during their stay and sometimes not returned to the parents as promised. Orphans, children from Ukrainian state institutions, and children who have become separated from their legal guardians due to the conflict are also sent to these camps before their eventual adoption and/or placement in foster care in Russia. At least 6,000 Ukrainian children have attended such camps; analysis of information from public accounts and satellite imagery has indicated the number of children housed in such camps to be far higher.

All levels of the Russian government - federal, regional, and local - are involved in the operation of the camps, and their operation is supported by Russian occupation authorities and proxies, and by members of Russia's civil society and private sector. Vladimir Putin and Maria Lvova-Belova advocated for the camps.

=== Using children for propaganda ===
The Russian state begun using abducted Ukrainian children for propaganda purposes during the War in Donbas. The domestic narrative of the Russian state is that abandoned children are rescued from the ravages of war by the magnanimous Russian state. The forced transfer of Ukrainian children forms part of a broader propaganda strategy by Vladimir Putin attempting to portray Ukraine as part of the Russian nation, justify the invasion, and bolster support for the war. Abducted children were paraded at a government pro-war rally marking the first anniversary of the invasion, where they were shown thanking Russian soldiers for "saving them". The Russian state has carefully crafted the portrayal of the forced transfers of children to the Russian public. Russian state television has broadcast footage of Russian officials handing out teddy bears to newly arrived abducted children, and Russian officials in Donetsk have invited reporters to events where gifts were handed out to abducted children.

=== Preventing repatriation and family reunification ===
Many parents wish to reunite with their children (some do not, either due to financial reasons or previous estrangement). Russian authorities do not make any attempt to contact parents to notify them that their children are in the custody of the Russian state and have refused to cooperate with the Ukrainian government and international organisations in tracking the children. Likewise, they do not release any information regarding the identities of the transferred children, making it difficult for Ukrainian and international authorities to locate and identify the children. The first and last names of the abducted children are also changed, making it even more difficult to track down and identify the children.

Ukraine's ombudsman on children's rights has said the process of tracking down abducted children is especially difficult with young children that may not remember where they are from. Even in cases where parents have successfully tracked down their children and formally applied to the Russian authorities to be reunited with them, Russian officials have attempted to pressure or persuade the parents and children to consent to transfer, promising creature comforts and a better life. In cases where parents (or other legal guardian) and children are unable to establish contact or parents are unable or unwilling to personally come collect the children, children are deported to Russia even if they personally express a desire to remain in Ukraine. Abducted children have been lied to by Russian officials about their parents having abandoned them.

=== Funding ===
For the year of 2024, according to an investigation published in February 2024 by a coalition of journals including VSquare, Delfi, Expressen and Paper Trail Media, Lvova-Belova was scheduled to be paid from the Russian Federation budget the equivalent of €420,000 "for the removal of children from the Special Military Occupation Zone".

== Belarusian involvement ==
The Belarusian state and state-affiliated organisations have actively participated in the forced transfers of Ukrainian children. Ukrainian children have been deported to Belarus where they are held in recreational camps. The National Anti-Crisis Management Group, a Belarusian organisation headed by Belarusian opposition figure Pavel Latushka, used open-source information to report in August 2023 that at least 2,100 Ukrainian children had been transferred to Belarus. According to Latushka, they were being held in summer camps administered by state-owned corporations. He also said that to state documents showed the transfers are being conducted under the authority of the Union State. The transfers of Ukrainian children have been shown on Belarusian state television. There are indications of re-education efforts by the Belarusian state. Much of the information about the child abductions has come from their parents; children that have been deported to Belarus were abducted from regions of Ukraine which were still under Russian occupation as of August 2023, impeding investigations.

According to international humanitarian law, children in war zones should be evacuated to neutral third countries whenever possible; Belarus lent its territory to be used as a staging ground for the 2022 Russian invasion of Ukraine.

In a July 2023 interview with the Belarusian state TV channel Belarus-1, Dzmitry Shautsou, the head of the Belarus Red Cross, clad in military clothing embellished with the Z symbol, admitted to the abduction and deportation of Ukrainian children from Russian-occupied areas to Belarus for “health improvement” reasons, saying that it would continue to do so. The International Federation of Red Cross and Red Crescent Societies distanced itself from his statements while expressing "grave concern", demanded a halt to the practice, and launched an investigation by its investigative committee.

Belarusian president Alexander Lukashenko has dismissed concerns regarding the transfers, suggesting that Ukrainian children were instead being trafficked to Western countries for organ harvesting.

In February 2024, the European Union blacklisted Shautsou, as well as several other persons and organizations from Belarus for their involvement in the Ukrainian child abductions. The United States, Ukraine, Australia and New Zealand have also imposed sanctions in relation to the forced deportations.

== North Korean involvement ==
Ukraine reported that at least two children (a 12 year old and a 16 year old) were sent to the Songdowon International Children's Camp in North Korea. The matter was discussed in a U.S. Senate subcommittee.

== Genocide question ==
The 1948 Genocide Convention states:

Article II. In the present Convention, genocide means any of the following acts committed with intent to destroy, in whole or in part, a national, ethnical, racial or religious group, as such: ... (e) Forcibly transferring children of the group to another group.

Russia's kidnapping and forcible transfer of Ukrainian children to Russify them has sometimes been mentioned as meeting the requirements of the Genocide Convention. According to a May 2022 report by the Raoul Wallenberg Centre for Human Rights in Montreal and the New Lines Institute in Washington, there are "reasonable grounds to conclude" that Russia is in breach of two articles of the 1948 Genocide Convention, among them the forcible transfer of Ukrainian children to Russia, in itself a genocidal act.

Genocide scholar Timothy D. Snyder tweeted: "Kidnapping children en masse and seeking to assimilate them in a foreign culture is genocide according to Article 2 Section E of the 1948 genocide convention." Professor in Law Yulia Ioffe wrote that the child abductions satisfy the prima facie elements of the crime of genocide. Lily Muelrath of the University of Wisconsin Law School agreed with such classification, as did Azeem Ibrahim, Research Professor at the Strategic Studies Institute.

British sociologist Martin Shaw included it as just one of several Russian acts in Ukraine amounting to genocide. Criminal law Professors Denys Azarov, Dmytro Koval, Gaiane Nuridzhanian and Volodymyr Venher argued that the permanent separation of Ukrainian children from their families and national identity amounts to a larger plan of the destruction of Ukrainian nation. Others have compared it to a cultural genocide. American-Ukrainian lawyer Askold Lozynskyj identified three attempted genocides against Ukrainian people, the Holodomor, Operation Vistula, and the Russian invasion and attack against Ukraine since 2014, including deportation of Ukrainian children.

In April 2023, the Council of Europe deemed the forced transfers of children as constituting an act of genocide in with an overwhelming majority of 87 in favour of the resolution to 1 against and 1 abstaining.

== Sanctions ==
Russian children's rights commissioner Maria Lvova-Belova has been sanctioned by the United States, the European Union, the United Kingdom, Canada and Australia.

== Arrest warrants ==
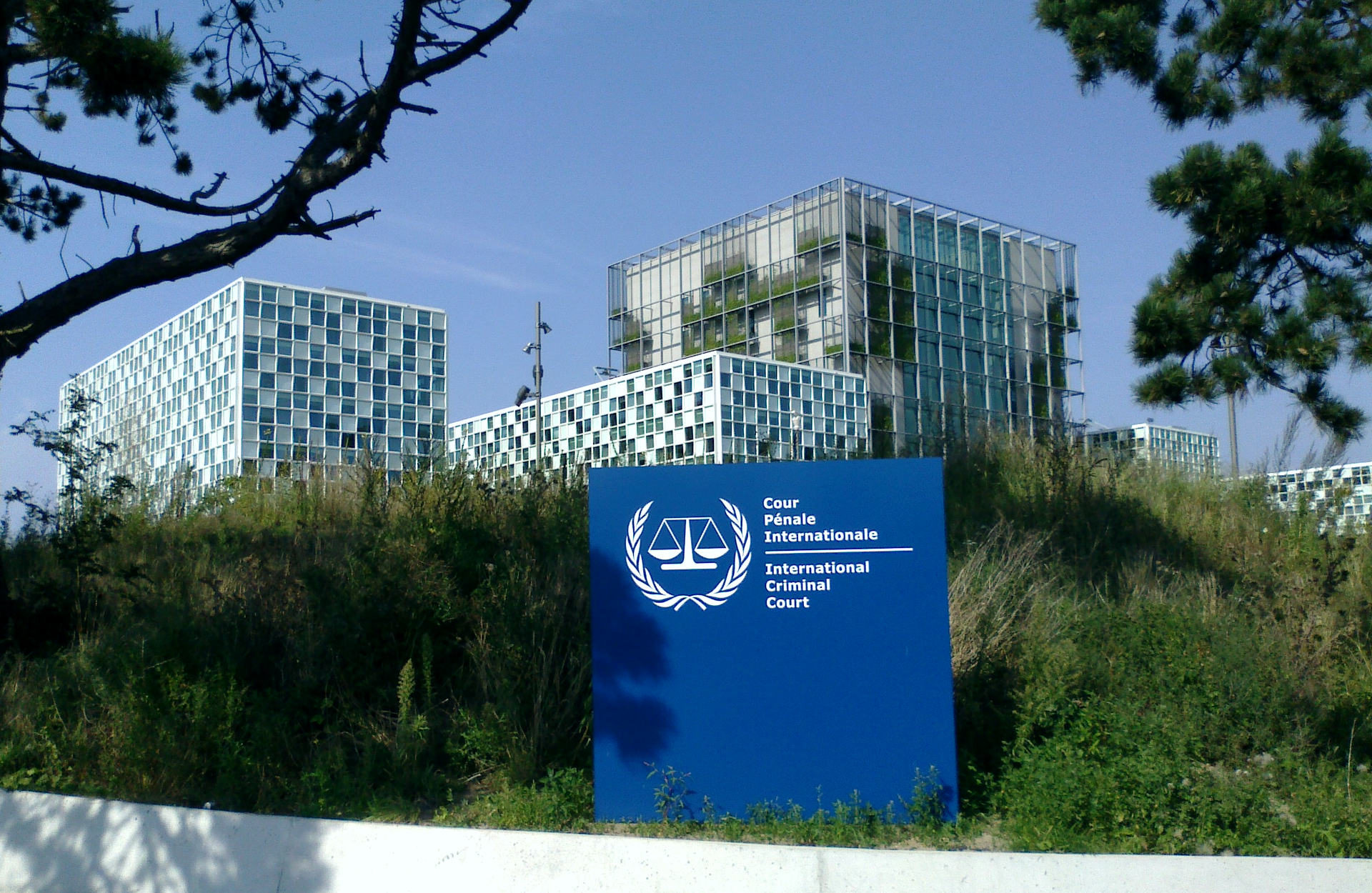
International Criminal Court building at The Hague

On 17 March 2023, the International Criminal Court issued arrest warrants for Putin and Lvova-Belova, alleging criminal responsibility for the unlawful deportation and transfer of population (children) from occupied areas of Ukraine to Russia. It decided that they are covered by articles 8(2)(a)(vii) and article 8(2)(b)(viii) of the Rome Statute and intended by Russia as permanent. The charges carry a potential life sentence. It is the first time the court has issued an arrest warrant against the leader of a permanent member of the United Nations Security Council. ICC Prosecutor Karim Khan said, "We must ensure that those responsible for alleged crimes are held accountable and that children are returned to their families and communities. We cannot allow children to be treated as if they are the spoils of war."

== Reactions ==
=== Ukraine ===
Ukrainian authorities have claimed Putin's decree to be a way to "legalize the abduction of children from the territory of Ukraine". They have maintained this "grossly violate[s]" the 1949 Geneva Convention Relative to the Protection of Civilian Persons in Time of War, and the 1989 UN Convention on the Rights of the Child.

The Foreign Ministry of Ukraine also believes that the actions may qualify as a forcible transfer of children from one human group to another. In a statement: "The most serious international crimes against children committed by Russian high-ranking officials and servicemen in Ukraine will be investigated, and the perpetrators will be prosecuted. Russia will not be able to avoid the strictest accountability."

By 31 May 2023, Radio Free Europe/Radio Liberty's Ukrainian Service reported that Zelenskiy said 371 deported Ukraine children have been returned by Russia. More than 19,000 children have been deported to Russia.

=== Russia ===
Lvova-Belova has claimed that the Russian state is entirely willing to reunite the children with their parents if they come forward.

On 17 June 2023, Vladimir Putin rejected the request of a peace delegation from Africa to return the children back home, saying that "We moved them out of the conflict zone, saving their lives and health."

In June 2025, during the Istanbul talks, Ukraine handed over a list of 339 children, which was a partial list of the nearly 20,000 children it said it had verified as abducted by Russia. Vladimir Medinsky, head of the Russian delegation, emphasized that this figure was far smaller than the reported 20,000. Medinsky also said that Russia would review the list, while insisting that "not a single child was abducted" and that many Ukrainian children had been "rescued from the combat zone." On 23 July, Medinsky stated that the list of 339 children is being reviewed, saying that some have been returned to Ukraine, while the rest are being checked for the presence of legal guardians.

=== United Nations ===
UNICEF Emergency Programs Director Manuel Fontaine told CBS News that UNICEF was "looking into how we can track or help on that", though stating they did not have ability to investigate at the moment.

Michelle Bachelet, the United Nations High Commissioner for Human Rights, announced on 15 June 2022 that her agency had started an investigation into allegations of children forcibly deported from Ukraine to the Russian Federation.

On 15 March 2023, the Office of the United Nations High Commissioner for Human Rights (OHCHR) released a report declaring these forced transfers of children are illegal and a war crime. It broadly gave three categories of deported children: those who lost contact with their parents due to the Russian invasion, those who were separated when their parents were sent to a Russian filtration camp, and those who were in institutions. The report concluded:

International humanitarian law prohibits the evacuation of children by a party to the armed conflict, with the exception of a temporary evacuation where compelling reasons relating to the health or medical treatment of the children or, except in occupied territory, their safety, so requires. The written consent of parents or legal guardians is required. In none of the situations which the Commission has examined, transfers of children appear to have satisfied the requirements set forth by international humanitarian law. The transfers were not justified by safety or medical reasons. There seems to be no indication that it was impossible to allow the children to relocate to territory under Ukrainian Government control... The Commission has concluded that the situations it has examined concerning the transfer and deportation of children, within Ukraine and to the Russian Federation respectively, violate international humanitarian law, and amount to a war crime.

In March 2026, a UN inquiry found Russian forces guilty of war crimes and crimes against humanity, consisting of forcible transfer, deportation and enforced disappearance.

=== Holy See ===
The Holy See has pursued the return of Ukrainian children through both formal diplomacy and humanitarian channels. In April 2023, Pope Francis met with Ukrainian Prime Minister Denys Shmyhal and pledged the Vatican would do "all that is humanly possible" to reunite families. In May 2023, Francis appointed Cardinal Matteo Zuppi as personal papal envoy, with the return of deported children as a central priority. Zuppi made two visits to Moscow, in June 2023 and October 2024, meeting Russian officials including Maria Lvova-Belova to discuss family reunification.

By November 2025, roughly 1,600 Ukrainian children had been returned, in part through Vatican efforts. Later in November, Pope Leo XIV received a delegation of returned Ukrainian children and officials at the Apostolic Palace, as President Zelenskyy formally requested the Holy See formalise its mediation role. Meeting Zelenskyy in December 2025, Leo acknowledged that progress remained "very slow" but confirmed the Holy See was continuing to work to "get those children back to their homes, to their families."

=== Civil society ===
==== France ====
On 21 December 2022, a French NGO, "For Ukraine, for their Freedom and Ours!", submitted via the law firm Vigo a communication to Karim Khan, Chief Prosecutor for the International Criminal Court, to contribute to "the investigation opened on 2 March 2022 by the Office of the Prosecutor, upon referral of the situation in Ukraine by a coordinated group of States Parties to the Rome Statute".

==== Ukraine ====
The Ukrainian charitable organization "Save Ukraine", which was established in 2014, has been instrumental in rescuing and rehabilitating displaced persons and abducted children during the Russian invasion of Ukraine. "The Mothers of Kherson" opera about these child abductions opened at the National Opera of Ukraine in Kyiv in June 2026. Internationally, this opera "will be fully staged in Warsaw this autumn and there will be a New York premiere at the Metropolitan Opera in spring 2028."

== See also ==
- War crimes in the Russian invasion of Ukraine
- Save Ukraine – Ukrainian charitable organization
- Deportation of Ukrainian children to Belarus
- American Indian boarding schools – Schools for assimilating Native Americans
- Canadian Indian residential school system – Schools to assimilate Indigenous children
  - Sixties Scoop – Canadian policy of forcibly putting Indigenous children up for adoption
- Cultural genocide – Genocide involving destruction of culture
- Kidnapping of children by Nazi Germany – Cultural genocide of children in Nazi Germany
  - Lebensborn – Nazi Germany eugenics program
- Kinder der Landstrasse – Swiss project to remove Yenish children from their families
- Little Danes experiment – 1951 Greenlandic social experiment
- Native schools – Schools established to acculturate Māori into white New Zealander society
- Norwegianization – Forced assimilation of minorities in Norway
- Sōshi-kaimei – 1939, 1940 Japanese regulations on names in Korea
- Stolen Generations – Indigenous Australian children forcibly acculturated into White Australian society
- Yemenite Children Affair – Disappearance of thousands of children in 1950s Israel
