= Daria Zarivna =

Ukrainian presidential adviser (born 1989)

- Дарія Зарівна
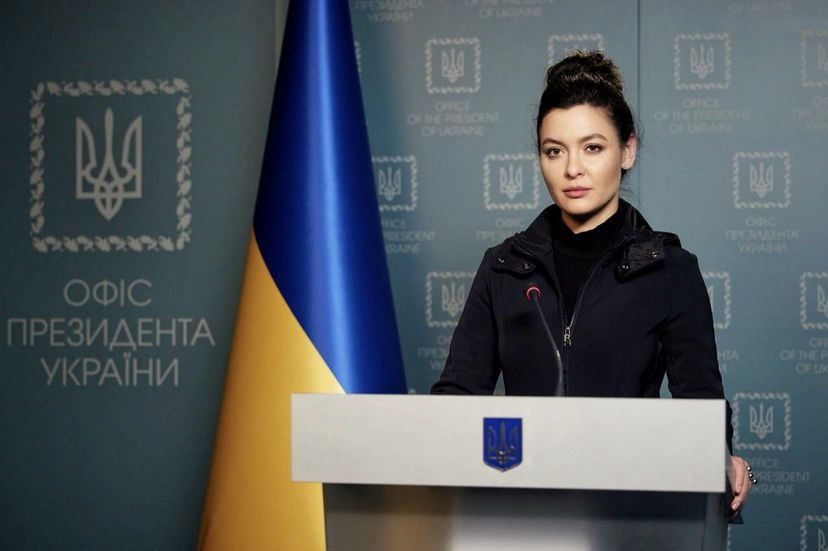
- Zarivna in 2022

Personal details
- Born: 4 July 1989 (age 37) Kherson, Ukrainian SSR
- Education: Taras Shevchenko National University of Kyiv
- Occupation: Ukrainian advisor, press secretary

Daria Oleksandrivna Zarivna (Ukrainian: Дарія Олександрівна Зарівна; born 4 July 1989) is a social activist, and entrepreneur. She was involved in media business, creative industry and charity before joining state service. Zarivna became an advisor of the National Security and Defense Council of Ukraine in June 2019, and an advisor of the Head of the Office of the President of Ukraine Andriy Yermak in February 2020. She resigned from this position on 4 July 2025.

Since the beginning of the 2022 Russian full-scale invasion of Ukraine she has been participating in information digests providing latest war updates on behalf of the president of Ukraine's Office.

She is a member of Yermak-McFaul Expert Group on Russian Sanctions, Group on International Security Guarantees (Yermak-Rassmussen Group), The Council on Youth Affairs under the President of Ukraine, Working Group on Hunger Prevention ("Grain from Ukraine" humanitarian food program) and OECD Working Group on Bribery. She is also in charge of launching the International Working Group on Environmental crimes committed by Russia against Ukraine and International Working Group "Bring Kids Back UA" on protection of the rights of Ukrainian children deported by Russia.

Daria is responsible for communications support of prisoners of war exchange processes cooperating with the Coordination Headquarters on the treatment of prisoners of war.

Daria promotes Spend with Ukraine volunteering initiative to help people from all around the world discover Ukraine's products and services.

In 2021, she entered the top 100 most influential women in Ukraine according to Focus magazine (34th place).

== Early life ==
Daria Zarivna was born in Kherson, Ukraine.

She graduated from Taras Shevchenko National University of Kyiv.

She also passed Strategic Marketing Course at Stanford University, Values and Society course in Aspen Institute.

Daria graduated a special Course of the Strategic Communications conducted by the UK Government.

== Career ==
In 2014, she launched the online version of the L'Officiel Ukraine magazine, where Zarivna was the editor-in-chief.

Zarivna is a co-founder of the Elevate Conference, and she was also a director at the ANGRY advertising agency.

In July 2018, she founded the Vector media about technology and business. Also, Zarivna is the co-founder and CEO of the social platform Charitum, an online auction service that helps raise money for various charitable foundations and initiatives, and at the same time is an online social media where articles tell about people in need of help.

On February 11, 2020, Daria Zarivna became the Adviser of Andriy Yermak, who was appointed Head of the Office of the President of Ukraine.

In December 2020, Zarivna and her business media Vector launched the podcast "What are you doing?" (Ukrainian: "Що ви творите?”), in which she communicates with Ukrainian entrepreneurs and creatives.

List of major podcasts "What are you doing?" conducted by Daria Zarivna: Vladyslav Chechotkin, Сo-founder and co-owner of the biggest Ukrainian marketplace Rozetka.ua; Yaroslava Gres, Ukrainian public figure, journalist, entrepreneur and philanthropist, co-owner of Gres-Todorchuk PR Agency, author of multimedia exhibition "Ukraine WOW", UNITED24 Global Initiative Coordinator; Dmytro Shvets, CEO of Reface application.

In January 2022 Daria Zarivna was assigned to participate in governmental youth policy making within newly created The Council on Youth Affairs under the President of Ukraine.

Few weeks after full-scale Russian invasion of Ukraine Daria Zarivna has been responsible for information support of the Coordination Headquarters for Humanitarian and Social Affairs established by President of Ukraine Volodymyr Zelenskyy on March 2, 2022.

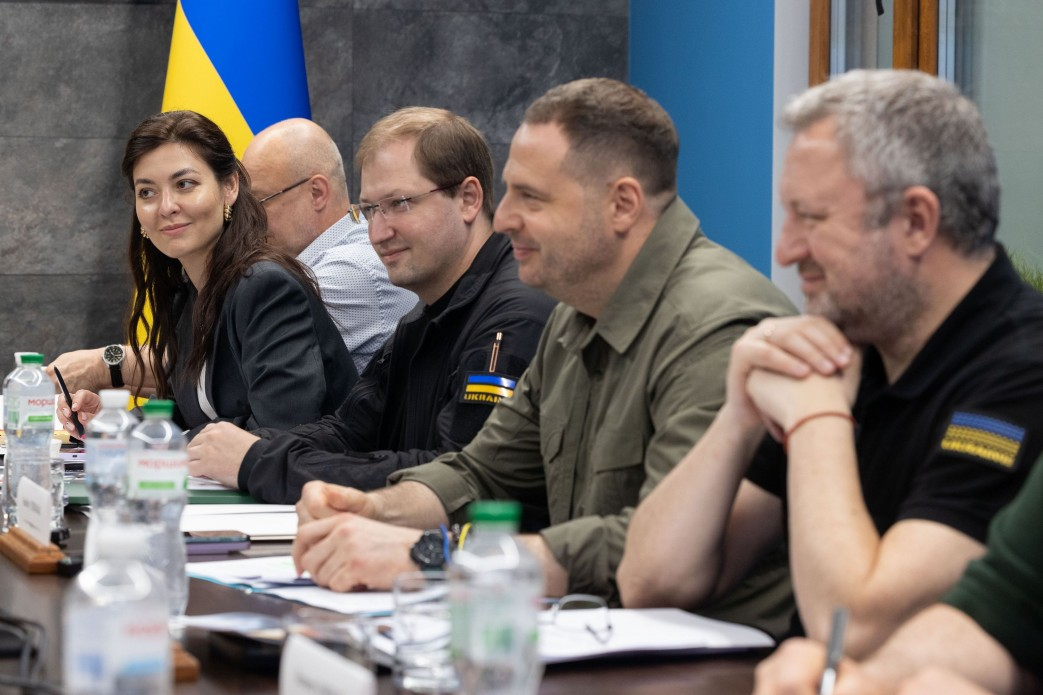
During the first meeting of the International Working Group on the Environmental Consequences of War

In April 2022 Daria Zarivna became a member of the International Working Group on sanctions against Russia, launched by Andriy Yermak and former Ambassador of the US to Russia Michael McFaul (Yermak-McFaul Expert Group on Russian Sanctions) being responsible for communications.

On 1 July 2022 Daria Zarivna was appointed as project-manager for Group on International Security Guarantees for Ukraine held by Andriy Yermak and Anders Fogh Rasmussen (Yermak-Rassmussen Group) together with Oleksandr Bevz.

In July 2022 Daria Zarivna was appointed by President Volodymyr Zelenskyy as a member of OECD Working Group on Bribery.

She participates as Working Group on Hunger Prevention member ("Grain from Ukraine" humanitarian food program) to address the global food security risks since November 3, 2022.

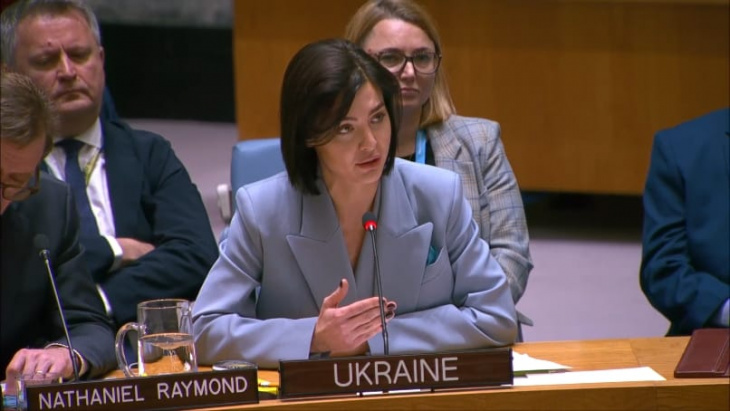
At the UN Security Council meeting

In December 2024, Zarivna spoke at the UN headquarters in New York, where she presented a report on Russia's war crimes in Ukraine. She demonstrated to members of the UN Security Council how Russia forged documents on Ukrainian children to destroy their identities. Zarivna showed the birth certificate of Margarita Prokopenko, who was 10 months old when she was forcibly deported from the Kherson baby home, illegally adopted, her name changed and her place of birth falsified. Inna Varlamova, the wife of Russian politician Sergey Mironov, organised the girl's move to Moscow. During her speech, she also drew attention to the illegality of Russia's membership in the UN Security Council. According to Zarivna, "Russia's imperial exhibitionism must be put to an end".

== Recognition ==
According to the investigation of the LIGA.net media about the Office of the President of Ukraine, Daria Zarivna, together with Mykhailo Podolyak, is responsible for the information direction of the Office.
