= Ukrainian-African Renaissance =

Ukrainian establishment of diplomacy with African nations

The Ukrainian-African Renaissance is the conventional name given to Ukraine's political and diplomatic efforts to establish relations with African states, starting in 2022. The term was first used by the Minister of Foreign Affairs of Ukraine, Dmytro Kuleba, in October 2022.

== Content ==
The conceptual basis of the Ukrainian-African Renaissance was laid by the Strategy for the Development of Ukraine’s Relations with African States, developed by the Ministry of Foreign Affairs of Ukraine. Prior to its implementation, Africa was mentioned in the program and strategic documents of Ukrainian state authorities only in passing, usually in conjunction with the Middle East region. The outlined plan was instituted on January 14, 2022, prior to the beginning of Russia's full-scale invasion of Ukraine. As a result of the invasion, Kyiv sought increased support for its war efforts as a key task of its renewed approach to building relations with African states.

Key steps instituted by Ukraine to enhance ties to African nations included the appointment of Maksym Subh as the Special Representative of Ukraine for the Middle East and Africa, four tours of Africa by the Minister of Foreign Affairs of Ukraine Dmytro Kuleba, along with an African-Middle East tour conducted by newly-appointed Foreign Minister Andrii Sybiha. Kyiv also launched Ukrainian embassies in Ghana, the Democratic Republic of the Congo, Ivory Coast, Mozambique, Botswana, Rwanda, Mauritania, and Tanzania between 2023 and 2025, increasing the total number of Ukrainian diplomatic missions in Africa from ten to eighteen.

== Results ==
Preliminary results of the activities within the conditional framework of the Ukrainian-African Renaissance included the acquisition of contacts between Ukraine and the leaders of African states, as well as the expansion of interparliamentary and interdepartmental cooperation with the bodies of individual states and associations of African states.

Ukraine's increased focus on African diplomacy resulted in strengthened mutual engagement between Ukraine and African nations, particularly as African economies faced impacts from the Russo-Ukrainian War's effects on global markets. African nations became the primary beneficiaries of the "Grain from Ukraine" humanitarian initiative, which helped address food security concerns. Africa's growing interest in Ukraine was further demonstrated by the June 16, 2023 visit to Kyiv by the presidents of Senegal, Comoros, South Africa, and Zambia, along with Egypt's Prime Minister, who came to present their proposals for ending the Russo-Ukrainian War. Strengthening ties were also reflected in the support of fourteen African nations for the Joint Communiqué on the Foundations of Peace following the Ukraine Peace Summit in June 2024.
