= Robert Otto Pohl =

German-American physicist (1929–2024)

- Born: December 17, 1929; Göttingen, Germany
- Died: August 30, 2024 (aged 94); Göttingen, Germany
- Education: University of Freiburg (B.A); University of Erlangen–Nuremberg (PhD)
- Known for: 3ω-method
- Father: Robert Wichard Pohl
- Awards: Oliver E. Buckley Prize (1985)
- Scientific career
- Fields: Condensed matter physics
- Workplaces: Cornell University
- Doctoral students: Venkatesh Narayanamurti

Robert Otto Pohl (December 17, 1929 – August 30, 2024) was a German-American physicist, specialized in condensed matter physics topics such as amorphous solids, glass, thermal conductivity, and thin films, who was the Goldwin Smith Emeritus Professor of Physics at Cornell University. He developed the 3ω-method, widely used to measure thermal conductivities. He is also known for showing that thermal properties of glass are different from crystalline solids at low temperatures.

== Biography ==
Pohl was born in Göttingen in 1929. His father was the physicist Robert Wichard Pohl, whose maternal grandfather was Wichard Lange (1826–1884), a member of the Hamburg Parliament. After completing undergraduate study at the University of Freiburg, Pohl matriculated as a graduate student at the University of Erlangen–Nuremberg. There he graduated with a Diplom (M.S.) in 1955 and a doctorate in 1957 and worked as an assistant in physics for the academic year 1957–1958. He immigrated to the United States in 1958.

At Cornell University, he was a research associate from 1958 to 1960, an assistant professor from 1960 to 1963, an associate professor from 1963 to 1968, a full professor from 1968 to 2000, and Goldwin Smith Emeritus Professor of Physics from 2000 to 2024. He held visiting appointments at RWTH Aachen University (1964), the University of Stuttgart (1966–1967), LMU Munich, the University of Konstanz, the University of Regensburg, New Zealand's University of Canterbury, China's Tongji University, and the Nuclear Research Center Jülich.

=== Research ===
Robert O. Pohl has done research on experimental investigations of glass and glassy materials, as well as heat transport and lattice transport behavior in crystalline solids and in amorphous solids, structure of glass, cryogenic techniques, and energy problems.

With R. C. Zeller, Pohl worked on glass at low temperatures. They showed in 1971 that glasses behave similarly at low temperature but do not follow the Debye model.

His doctoral students included Venkatesh Narayanamurti.

Springer published Robert Wichard Pohl's 3-volume edition of Einführung in die Physik (vol. 1, Mechanik und Akustik, 1930; vol. 2, Elektrizitätslehre, 1927; vol. 3, 1940, Optik) with many later editions and a 2-volume edition edited by Klaus Lüders and Robert O. Pohl (vol. 1, Mechanik, Akustik und Wärmelehre, 19th edition, 2004; vol. 2, 22nd edition, 2006). Robert O. Pohl added videos of demonstration experiments for the latest editions.

Pohl died in Göttingen, Germany on August 30, 2024, at the age of 94.

== Pohl's opinions on nuclear waste disposal ==
In addition to his main research interests, Robert O. Pohl was concerned about radioactive waste disposal and its effects on the environment and human health. During the Carter administration he served on a Presidential advisory committee on nuclear waste disposal.

In a 1982 article published in Physics Today, Pohl wrote:

In discussing adequate protection from the nuclear waste, the proper yardstick, in my opinion, is not how many people will be killed by it on a statistical basis (sometimes even expressed as the number of cancer fatalities per megawatt-year of electrical energy produced). Rather, the point is whether we want to impose on future generations the need to live permanently with radiation monitors, something we do not have to do right now—apart from some unfortunate exceptions. In my opinion, we should make every effort to avoid subjecting our descendants to this additional concern. This would require find permanently safe disposal methods for all forms of radioactive wastes, since any disposal of long-lived radioactive species in shallow landfills, or through ocean dumping, as is currently practiced for the many of low-level waste arising in the nuclear fuel cycle, would be unacceptable.

== Honors and awards ==
In 1985 he received the Oliver E. Buckley Condensed Matter Prize for "his pioneering work on low energy excitations in amorphous materials and continued important contributions to the understanding of thermal transport in solids." It was considered the highest recognition in condensed matter physics.

Pohl was elected in 1972 a fellow of the American Physical Society, in 1984 a fellow of American Association for the Advancement of Science and in 1999 a member of the National Academy of Sciences. For the academic year 1973–1974 he was a Guggenheim Fellow. In 1980 he received the Humboldt US Senior Scientist Award.

== See also ==
- Nuclear Waste Policy Act
- Ocean disposal of radioactive waste

== Selected publications ==
=== Articles ===
- Walker, C. T.; Pohl, R. O. (1963). "Phonon Scattering by Point Defects". Physical Review. 131 (4): 1433–1442. Bibcode:1963PhRv..131.1433W. doi:10.1103/PhysRev.131.1433.
- Narayanamurti, V.; Pohl, R. O. (1970). "Tunneling States of Defects in Solids". Reviews of Modern Physics. 42 (2): 201–236. Bibcode:1970RvMP...42..201N. doi:10.1103/RevModPhys.42.201. (over 500 citations)
- McNelly, T. F.; Rogers, S. J.; Channin, D. J.; Rollefson, R. J.; Goubau, W. M.; Schmidt, G. E.; Krumhansl, J. A.; Pohl, R. O. (1970). "Heat Pulses in NaF: Onset of Second Sound". Physical Review Letters. 24 (3): 100–102. Bibcode:1970PhRvL..24..100M. doi:10.1103/PhysRevLett.24.100.
- Zeller, R. C.; Pohl, R. O. (1971). "Thermal Conductivity and Specific Heat of Noncrystalline Solids". Physical Review B. 4 (6): 2029–2041. Bibcode:1971PhRvB...4.2029Z. doi:10.1103/PhysRevB.4.2029. (over 2200 citations)
- Slack, Glen A.; Tanzilli, R.A.; Pohl, R.O.; Vandersande, J.W. (1987). "The intrinsic thermal conductivity of AlN". Journal of Physics and Chemistry of Solids. 48 (7): 641–647. Bibcode:1987JPCS...48..641S. doi:10.1016/0022-3697(87)90153-3. (over 1050 citations) See aluminium nitride.
- Swartz, E. T.; Pohl, R. O. (1987). "Thermal resistance at interfaces". Applied Physics Letters. 51 (26): 2200–2202. Bibcode:1987ApPhL..51.2200S. doi:10.1063/1.98939. (over 400 citations)
- Cahill, David G.; Pohl, R. O. (1987). "Thermal conductivity of amorphous solids above the plateau". Physical Review B. 35 (8): 4067–4073. Bibcode:1987PhRvB..35.4067C. doi:10.1103/PhysRevB.35.4067. PMID 9941934.
- Klitsner, Tom; Pohl, R. O. (1987). "Phonon scattering at silicon crystal surfaces". Physical Review B. 36 (12): 6551–6565. Bibcode:1987PhRvB..36.6551K. doi:10.1103/PhysRevB.36.6551. PMID 9942367.
- Cahill, D. G.; Pohl, R. O. (1988). "Lattice Vibrations and Heat Transport in Crystals and Glasses". Annual Review of Physical Chemistry. 39: 93–121. Bibcode:1988ARPC...39...93C. doi:10.1146/annurev.pc.39.100188.000521. (over 450 citations)
- Klitsner, Tom; Vancleve, J. E.; Fischer, Henry E.; Pohl, R. O. (1988). "Phonon radiative heat transfer and surface scattering". Physical Review B. 38 (11): 7576–7594. Bibcode:1988PhRvB..38.7576K. doi:10.1103/PhysRevB.38.7576. PMID 9945485.
- Swartz, E. T.; Pohl, R. O. (1989). "Thermal boundary resistance". Reviews of Modern Physics. 61 (3): 605–668. Bibcode:1989RvMP...61..605S. doi:10.1103/RevModPhys.61.605. (over 3050 citations)
- Cahill, David G.; Fischer, Henry E.; Watson, S. K.; Pohl, R. O.; Slack, G. A. (1989). "Thermal properties of boron and borides". Physical Review B. 40 (5): 3254–3260. Bibcode:1989PhRvB..40.3254C. doi:10.1103/PhysRevB.40.3254. PMID 9992262.
- Cahill, David G.; Fischer, Henry E.; Klitsner, Tom; Swartz, E. T.; Pohl, R. O. (1989). "Thermal conductivity of thin films: Measurements and understanding". Journal of Vacuum Science & Technology A: Vacuum, Surfaces, and Films. 7 (3): 1259–1266. Bibcode:1989JVSTA...7.1259C. doi:10.1116/1.576265.
- Cahill, David G.; Pohl, R.O. (1989). "Heat flow and lattice vibrations in glasses". Solid State Communications. 70 (10): 927–930. Bibcode:1989SSCom..70..927C. doi:10.1016/0038-1098(89)90630-3.
- Cahill, David G.; Watson, S. K.; Pohl, R. O. (1992). "Lower limit to the thermal conductivity of disordered crystals". Physical Review B. 46 (10): 6131–6140. Bibcode:1992PhRvB..46.6131C. doi:10.1103/PhysRevB.46.6131. PMID 10002297. (over 2000 citations)
- Olson, J. R.; Pohl, R. O.; Vandersande, J. W.; Zoltan, A.; Anthony, T. R.; Banholzer, W. F. (1993). "Thermal conductivity of diamond between 170 and 1200 K and the isotope effect". Physical Review B. 47 (22): 14850–14856. Bibcode:1993PhRvB..4714850O. doi:10.1103/PhysRevB.47.14850. PMID 10005859.
- Kumar, G. S.; Prasad, G.; Pohl, R. O. (1993). "Experimental determinations of the Lorenz number". Journal of Materials Science. 28 (16): 4261–4272. Bibcode:1993JMatS..28.4261K. doi:10.1007/BF01154931. S2CID 121983892.
- Olson, J. R.; Topp, K. A.; Pohl, R. O. (1993). "Specific Heat and Thermal Conductivity of Solid Fullerenes". Science. 259 (5098): 1145–1148. Bibcode:1993Sci...259.1145O. doi:10.1126/science.259.5098.1145. PMID 17794394. S2CID 24872117.
- Liu, Xiao; White, Jr, B. E.; Pohl, R. O.; Iwanizcko, E.; Jones, K. M.; Mahan, A. H.; Nelson, B. N.; Crandall, R. S.; Veprek, S. (1997). "Amorphous Solid without Low Energy Excitations". Physical Review Letters. 78 (23): 4418–4421. Bibcode:1997PhRvL..78.4418L. doi:10.1103/PhysRevLett.78.4418.
- Pohl, Robert O.; Liu, Xiao; Thompson, Eunjoo (2002). "Low-temperature thermal conductivity and acoustic attenuation in amorphous solids". Reviews of Modern Physics. 74 (4): 991–1013. Bibcode:2002RvMP...74..991P. doi:10.1103/RevModPhys.74.991. (over 400 citations)
- Pohl, R.O. (2006). "Lattice vibrations of glasses". Journal of Non-Crystalline Solids. 352 (32–35): 3363–3367. Bibcode:2006JNCS..352.3363P. doi:10.1016/j.jnoncrysol.2006.01.102.

=== Books ===
- Lüders, K.; Pohl, R. O., eds. (13 July 2017). Pohl's Introduction to Physics: Volume 1: Mechanics, Acoustics and Thermodynamics. Springer. ISBN 9783319400464. translated from Pohls Einführung in die Physik, Band. 1 : Mechanik, Akustik und Wärmelehre by William D. Brewers (Vol. 1 contains 77 videos of experiments.)
- Lüders, K.; Pohl, R. O., eds. (5 February 2018). Pohl's Introduction to Physics: Volume 2: Electrodynamics and Optics. Springer. ISBN 9783319502694. translated from Pohls Einführung in die Physik, Band.2 : Elektizitaetslehre und Optik by William D. Brewer (Vol. 2 contains 41 videos of experiments.)
