= Alexander Smakula =

Ukrainian physicist

- Born: 9 September 1900; Dobrovody, Austria-Hungary (today Ukraine)
- Died: 17 May 1983 (aged 82); Auburn, Massachusetts, USA
- Education: University of Göttingen
- Known for: anti-reflective coating
- Scientific career
- Fields: Physicist
- Workplaces: Odessa University; Carl Zeiss AG; Massachusetts Institute of Technology
- Doctoral advisor: Robert Pohl

Alexander Smakula (Ukrainian: Олександр Теодорович Смакула) (1900 in Dobrovody, Austria-Hungary, today Ukraine – 17 May 1983 in Auburn, Massachusetts, USA) was a Ukrainian physicist known for the invention of anti-reflective lens coatings based on optical interference.

== Biography ==
Smakula was born to a peasant family in Dobrovody village, Austria-Hungary (today Ternopil Oblast, Ukraine). After finishing his studies at the Ternopil gymnasium he applied to the University of Göttingen from which he graduated in 1927. Afterwards he worked as an assistant of Prof. Robert Pohl. After his short stay at Odessa University, Smakula returned to Germany as head of an optics laboratory in Heidelberg. From 1934 he worked at the Carl Zeiss AG company in Jena. While at Zeiss, in 1935, Smakula invented and patented interference-based optical anti-reflective coatings, a significant advance in optical technology. The patent mentions practically almost no light absorbing organic and inorganic materials can be used for such coatings. These coatings remained a German military secret for several years, until the Allies discovered the secret during World War II. During World War II, Smakula collaborated with the Nazi regime and worked on infrared guidance for missiles. After the end of World War II Smakula went to the US with other German physicists, where he first worked in Virginia investigating materials for infrared technology. In 1951 he was offered a professorship at MIT, where he mainly did research into crystalline materials. Olexander Smakula died on May 17, 1983, and is buried in Auburn, Massachusetts, USA.
