= Andriy Pyshnyi =

Ukrainian politician and banker (born 1974)

- Андрій Пишний
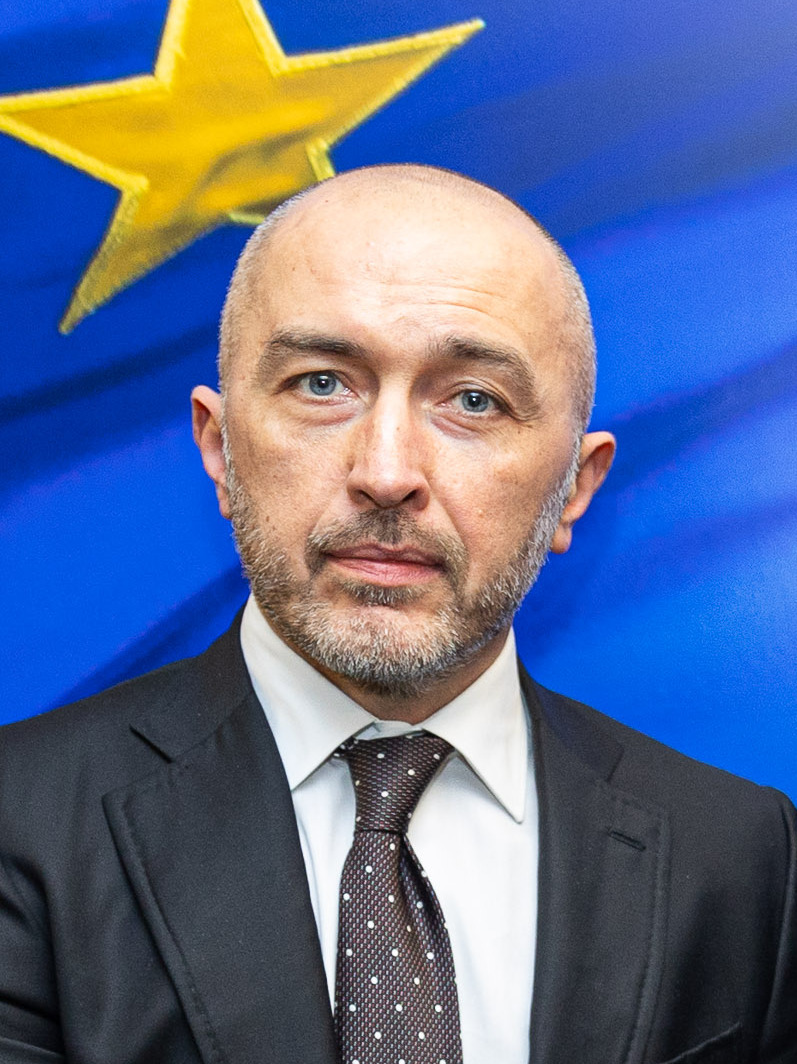
- Pyshnyi in 2024

Governor of the National Bank of Ukraine
- Incumbent
- Assumed office 7 October 2022
- President: Volodymyr Zelenskyy
- Preceded by: Kyrylo Shevchenko

People's Deputy of Ukraine
- In office 12 December 2012 – 27 November 2014

Personal details
- Born: October 26, 1974 (age 52) Dobrovody, Zbarazh Raion, Ternopil Oblast, Ukrainian SSR, Soviet Union (now Ukraine)
- Party: Batkivshchyna
- Spouse: Liudmyla Heorhiyivna
- Children: 2
- Education: Chernivtsi University
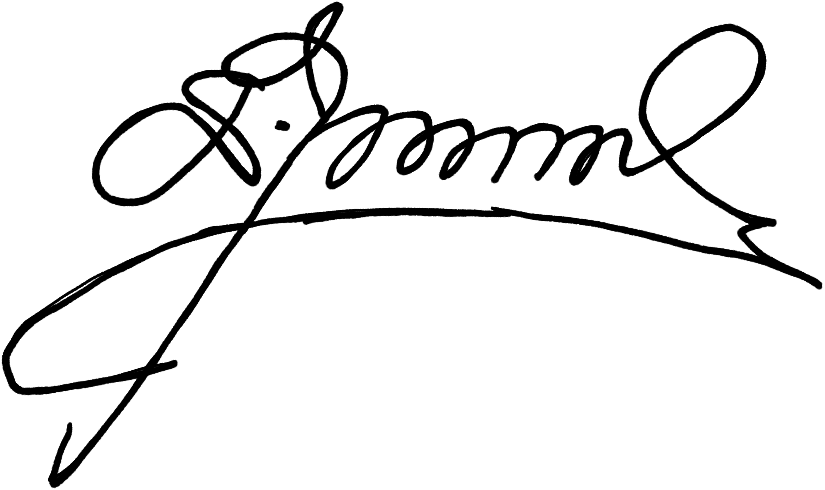
- Signature

Andriy Hryhorovych Pyshnyi (Ukrainian: Андрій Григорович Пишний; born 26 October 1974) is a Ukrainian politician and banker, who's currently serving as Governor of the National Bank of Ukraine since October 2022. Since 25 October 2022, he's a member of the National Security and Defense Council of Ukraine. From 2014 to 2022, he was head of Oschadbank and from 2012 to 2014, he was People's Deputy of Ukraine.

== Biography ==
Pyshnyi was born on October 26, 1974 in the Dobrovody village of Zbarazh Raion, Ternopil Oblast. His parents divorced when he was 11 years old. His mother worked at the city police department and later received the rank of major while battling cancer.

From 1991 to 1996, Pyshnyi studied law at Chernivtsi University, where he met Arseniy Yatseniuk. After graduating, from 1996 to 2000, he remained there as a trainee teacher and assistant at Department of Constitutional, Administrative, and Financial Law.

Since 1998, Pyshny headed the law firm "Pravkon" in Chernivtsi and was its co-owner. From 1998 to 2005, Pyshny was a co-owner (2%) of the LLC "Teleradiocompany "Inter-Chernivtsi" together with local politician and journalist Vasyl Zabrodsky (the latter owned 98%). Later, the firm was acquired by pro-Russian oligarchs Dmytro Firtash and Valeriy Khoroshkovskyi.

In 2008, he received a PhD in Law from the Institute of Legislation of the Verkhovna Rada in Kyiv. He defended his dissertation on the topic "Legal Status of State Banks of Ukraine".

=== Political career ===
In May 2007, Pyshnyi was appointed Deputy Secretary of the National Security and Defense Council of Ukraine. He was dismissed from the position by a decree of President Viktor Yushchenko in June 2009.

In 2010, Pyshnyi focused on Arseniy Yatsenyuk's party project "Front for Change", where he headed the party control committee. In the 2012 parliamentary elections, he was the deputy head of the Batkivshchyna headquarters, and in December, he became People's Deputy of Ukraine and was the leader of the "Yatsenyuk group" in the Batkivshchyna faction and the first deputy chairman of the parliamentary committee on rules of procedure.

On June 15, 2013, after the merger of the Front for Change and Batkivshchyna, he was elected deputy chairman of Batkvishchyna.

=== Banking career ===
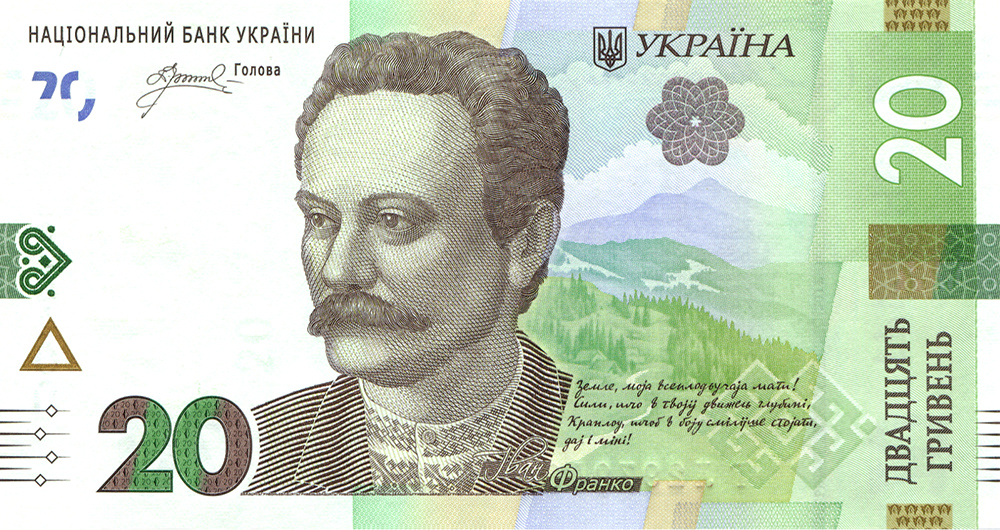
Ukrainian hryvnia banknotes have featured Pyshnyi's signature since his election as National Bank Chairman

In 2000, he moved to Kyiv to lead the legal department of Oschadbank. In 2001, he became director of the department.

From 2003 to 2007, Pyshnyi was First Deputy Chairman of the Board of Oschadbank. From December 2004 to May 2005, he served as Chairman of Oschadbank. In 2005, he graduated the Ukrainian Academy of Banking of the National Bank of Ukraine. From 2007, he worked at Ukreximbank.

Since March 26, 2014, he has been the Chairman of the Board of JSC Oschadbank.

On October 7, 2022, the Verkhovna Rada supported the election of Andriy Pyshnyi as Chairman of the National Bank of Ukraine. 290 People's Deputies supported the decision.

After the beginning of the Russian invasion of Ukraine, Pyshnyi, as National Bank Chairman, joined the Yermak-McFaul Expert Group, which developed proposals for new sanctions against Russia.

Under Pyshnyi's chairmanship, the Ukrainian kopiyka was proposed to be renamed back as a shah. Pyshnyi supported the change.

== Personal life ==
Pyshnyi is married to Liudmyla Heorhiyivna (born 1973), a university lecturer. They have two children together, Svitlana (born 1998) and Daryna (born 2003). Liudmyla and Andriy dated for three years before their marriage. For his 50th birthday, Pyshnyi asked Ukrainians to donate to charity, specifically to medical aid volunteer Tata Kepler.

=== Health ===
Since the age of 34, Pyshnyi has lost much of his hearing. Since then, he has been an activist for deaf rights as member of the "Vidchuy" ("Відчуй", lit. 'Feel') public organization. Pyshnyi, who now reads lips and used to play the accordion, said that he misses music a lot and has not heard a new song since 2009.

== Criticism ==
=== The legitimacy of his educational degree ===
In 2024, public doubts emerged in the media and political circles regarding the authenticity of the law degree held by the Governor of the NBU, Andriy Pyshnyi. Member of Parliament Dmytro Razumkov called on him to appear before the Verkhovna Rada to clarify the circumstances of obtaining the diploma or to resign. Specifically, journalists have questioned the procedure of Pyshnyi's transfer between higher education institutions in the 2000s—from Chernivtsi University to the Ukrainian Academy of Banking—suggesting that the process may have involved irregularities.

=== Personnel policy and the Dmytro Oliynyk case ===
Andriy Pyshnyi has been criticized for his personnel appointments, particularly for favoring members of his former team from "Oschadbank." The most significant resonance was caused by the activities of his deputy, Dmytro Oliynyk: he is the subject of journalistic investigations regarding undeclared real estate in Dubai and potential links to sanctioned bankers (specifically Oleg Bakhmatyuk), as well as an active criminal proceeding by NABU.

=== AIC investigation and Mindich-gate ===
The leadership of the NBU faced criticism in connection with the work of the Temporary Ad Hoc Commission (AIC) of the Verkhovna Rada, which investigated "Operation Midas". During the commission's meetings, NBU representatives were unable to clearly explain the origin of significant volumes of cash foreign currency featured in the case materials. This served as the basis for accusations against NBU Governor Andriy Pyshnyi regarding insufficient financial control by the regulator.

== Awards and titles ==
- Honorary weapons, a Fort-17 (26 May 2014) and a Glock 26 (21 August 2014)
- "Banker of the Year" by the Business.ua weekly (2017)
