= Coordination Headquarters for Humanitarian and Social Affairs (Ukraine) =

- Координаційний штаб з гуманітарних та соціальних питань

Agency overview
- Formed: March 2, 2022
- Headquarters: Kyiv, Ukraine
- Agency executive: Andriy Yermak, Chief of Staff
- Website: www.president.gov.ua

The Coordination Headquarters for Humanitarian and Social Affairs was established by the President of Ukraine to assist the country's citizens in overcoming difficult life circumstances in connection with the 2022 Russian invasion of Ukraine. He quickly coordinates volunteer initiatives, international humanitarian organizations and financial issues.

== History ==
The Coordination Headquarters for Humanitarian and Social Affairs was established by President of Ukraine Volodymyr Zelenskyy on March 2, 2022, during the full-scale Russian invasion of Ukraine.

He works in three areas: humanitarian aid from foreign governments and international organizations; assistance from big business to military administrations and communities; assistance from the authorities to military administrations and communities.

Andriy Yermak, Head of the Office of the President of Ukraine, has been appointed Chief of Staff. Yuliya Sokolovska, Deputy Head of the Office, is in charge of operational processes, and Daria Zarivna, Communications Adviser to the Head of the Office of the President of Ukraine, will provide information support.

According to the decree, the Government of Ukraine must ensure prompt cooperation between representatives of regional military administrations and the Coordination Headquarters. The government should also establish effective cooperation with diplomatic missions and consular posts of foreign countries, international organizations, foreign donors in providing humanitarian assistance to Ukraine.
