= 3ω-method =

Thermal conducitivity measurement technique

The 3ω-method (3 omega method) or 3ω-technique, is a measurement method for determining the thermal conductivities of bulk material (i.e. solid or liquid) and thin layers. The process involves a metal heater applied to the sample that is heated periodically. The temperature oscillations thus produced are then measured. The thermal conductivity and thermal diffusivity of the sample can be determined from their frequency dependence.

The process was first published by David Cahill and Robert Otto Pohl in 1987 in a paper titled "Thermal Conductivity of Amorphous Solids above the Plateau" in Physical Review.

== Theory ==
The 3ω-method can be accomplished by depositing a thin metal structure (generally a wire or a film) onto the sample to function as a resistive heater and a resistance temperature detector (RTD). The heater is driven with AC current at frequency ω, which induces periodic joule heating at frequency 2ω (since $P = I^{2}R$) due to the oscillation of the AC signal during a single period.

There will be some delay between the heating of the sample and the temperature response which is dependent upon the thermal properties of the sensor/sample. This temperature response is measured by logging the amplitude and phase delay of the AC voltage signal from the heater across a range of frequencies (generally accomplished using a lock-in-amplifier).

Note, the phase delay of the signal is the lag between the heating signal and the temperature response. The measured voltage will contain both the fundamental and third harmonic components (ω and 3ω respectively), because the Joule heating of the metal structure induces oscillations in its resistance with frequency 2ω due to the temperature coefficient of resistance (TCR) of the metal heater/sensor as stated in the following equation:

$$V=IR=I_0e^{i\omega t}\left (R_0+\frac{\partial R}{\partial T}\Delta T \right )=I_0e^{i\omega t}\left (R_0+C_0e^{i2\omega t} \right )=I_0R_0e^{i\omega t} + I_0C_0e^{i3\omega t}$$,

where C_{0} is constant. Thermal conductivity is determined by the linear slope of ΔT vs. log(ω) curve. The main advantages of the 3ω-method are minimization of radiation effects and easier acquisition of the temperature dependence of the thermal conductivity than in the steady-state techniques. Although some expertise in thin film patterning and microlithography is required, this technique is considered as the best pseudo-contact method available.
