= Squat32 =

- Сквот32
- Directed by: Sasha Lidagovsky
- Written by: Lyuko Dashvar
- Produced by: Andriy Yermak
- Starring: Oleksandr Bohachuk, Anna Adamovich, Rimaida Onadska, Serhiy Luzanovsky, Ihor Levenets, Ivan Blyndar
- Cinematography: Volodymyr Ivanov
- Music by: Viacheslav FAME Semenchenko
- Production company: Garnet International Media Group
- Distributed by: MMD UA (Ukraine)
- Release date: April 11, 2019
- Running time: 100 min
- Country: Ukraine
- Language: Ukrainian
- Budget: ₴12.5 million
- Box office: ₴0.5 million

Squat32 (Ukrainian: «Свот32», working titles "Wall" and "Prioritization Fixation") is a Ukrainian film from 2019, a youth romantic drama directed by Sasha Lidagovsky. The theatrical premiere of the film took place on April 11, 2019, in Ukraine and around the world.

== Plot ==
The main character, Lisa, who works at a passport center, unexpectedly finds herself in a Kyiv squat. In a dilapidated, semi-ruined building, she meets a community of free and talented creators: artists, dancers, and musicians. Elements of daily life are imbued with hip-hop culture: rap battles, graffiti, breaking, DJing, performances. The only lawful resident of the building is an eighty-year-old woman named Faina, who is the last obstacle for a local deputy to demolish the building and build an entire quarter.

Lisa is captivated by the energy and freedom of the squat residents. They fight for their way of life, create, and influence the world. Meeting these people changes the girl's life and worldview. She begins to move towards her dream, becomes more confident in herself, develops her own vision and style. Eventually, she is offered a job as a photographer.

== Starring ==
- Anna Adamovich – Lisa
- Oleksandr Bohachuk
- Rimayida Onadskaka
- Serhiy Luzanovskiy
- Ihor Levenets
- Ivan Blindar
- Sandra Sambo
- Kateryna Bahirka
- Vladyslav Partika
- Vyacheslav Semenchenko
- Nataliya Yefremova
- Serhiy Shadrin
- Yana Isayenko

== Budget ==
In December 2011, director Irina Gromozda's film project titled "The Wall" (initial name of "Squatt32") was submitted for pitching to the Ukrainian State Film Agency by the film company Prima Film LLC. It became one of the winners of the Second Pitching of the State Cinema Agency in the "Feature Films" section with 43.1 points and received state funding (the amount of money to be allocated from the state budget for this and other projects of the second pitching was not publicly disclosed by the State Cinema Agency) However, work on the project was halted in 2012 due to organizational issues, and on April 9, 2013, the film project was removed from the Program for the Production and Distribution of National Films for 2012/2013 by order of the Ministry of Culture.

In 2016, Irina Gromozda's film project titled "Priorities Fixation" (second working title "Squatt32") was submitted again for pitching to the State Cinema Agency, this time by the film company Garnet International Media Group LLC, and became one of the winners of the Ninth Pitching of the State Cinema Agency, receiving state funding as a directorial debut film in the amount of ₴10 million from a total budget of ₴12.5 million.

== Release ==
The theatrical premiere of the film in Ukraine and worldwide took place on April 11, 2019.

The television premiere of the film in Ukraine and worldwide took place on August 22, 2020, on the Suspilne Kultura channel.

== Reviews ==
The film received mostly positive reviews from Ukrainian film critics.
