= Dobrovody, Ternopil Raion, Ternopil Oblast =

Rural locality in Ternopil Oblast, Ukraine

Dobrovody Доброводи
- Location in Ternopil Oblast
- Coordinates: 49°43′17″N 25°37′55″E
- Country: Ukraine
- Oblast: Ternopil Oblast
- Raion: Ternopil Raion
- Hromada: Zbarazh urban hromada
- Time zone: UTC+2 (EET)
  - Summer (DST): UTC+3 (EEST)
- Postal code: 47341

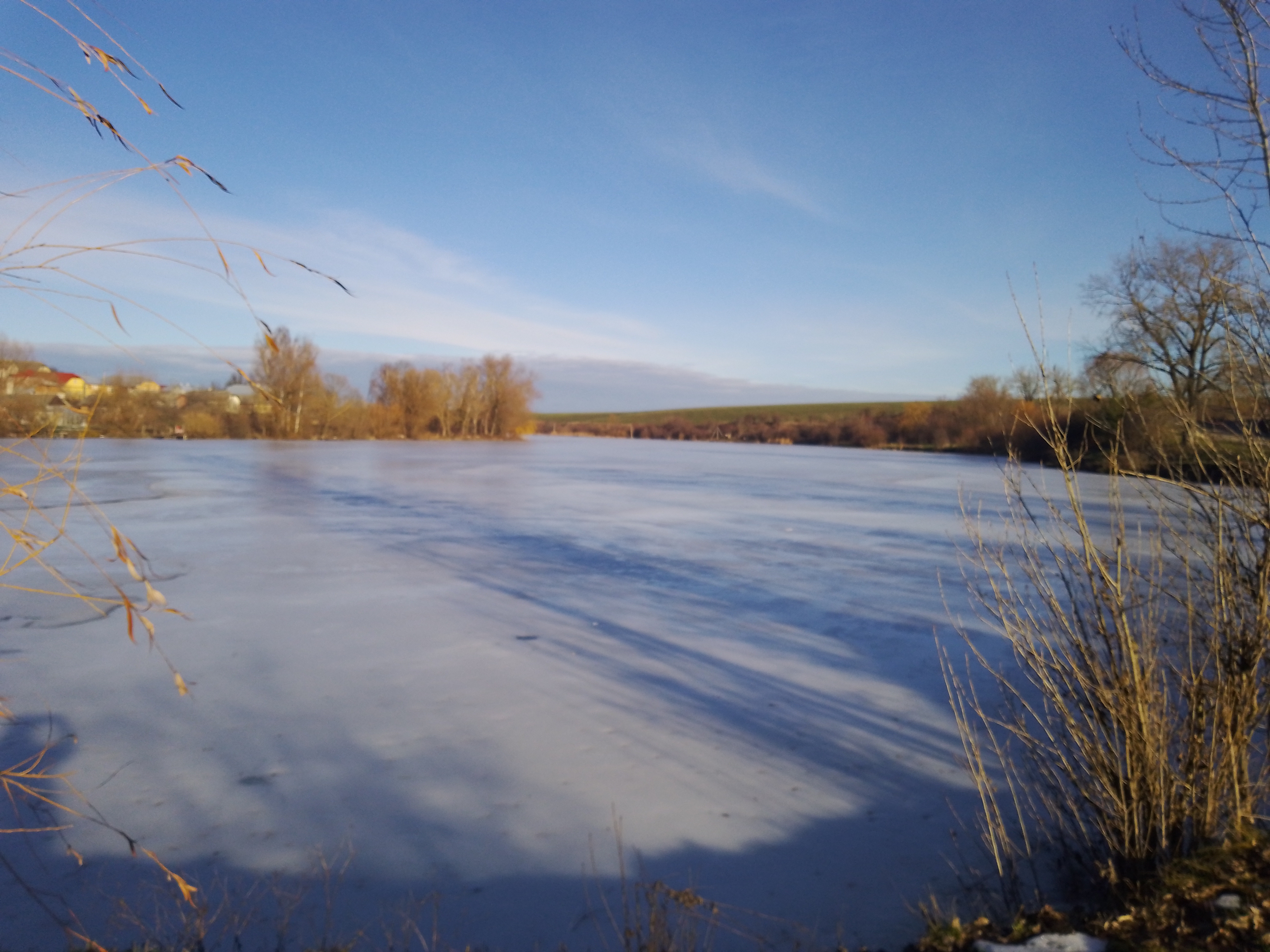
Dobryvidskyi Pond

Dobrovody (Ukrainian: Доброводи) is a village in the Zbarazh urban hromada of the Ternopil Raion of Ternopil Oblast in Ukraine.

== History ==
The first written mention of the village was in 1463.

After the liquidation of the Zbarazh Raion on 19 July 2020, the village became part of the Ternopil Raion.

== Religion ==
- Saint Paraskeva church (1794, brick).

== Notable residents ==
- Oleksander Smakula (1900–1983), Ukrainian physicist known for the invention of anti-reflective lens coatings based on optical interference
- Andrii Pyshnyi (born 1974), Ukrainian banker and politician

The village was visited by writers Ivan Drach, Roman Ivanychuk, Dmytro Pavlychko, and Borys Kharchuk.

== Sources ==
- (in Ukrainian) Пиріжо А., Уніят В., Доброводи // Ternopil Encyclopedic Dictionary: in 4 v. / editorial board: H. Yavorskyi and other, Ternopil: "Zbruch", 2004, V. 1: А—Й, S. 510—511. — ISBN 966-528-197-6.
- "Dobrowody 2.) D., wś, pow. zbaraski". Geographical Dictionary of the Kingdom of Poland (in Polish). 2. Warszawa: Kasa im. Józefa Mianowskiego. 1881. p. 80.
- Назар М. Добриводи: історичний нарис. — Збараж : Медобори, 1997. — 20 с.
- Назар М. Село Доброводи у пам'ятниках: історико-краєзнавчий нарис. — Тернопіль : Воля, 2008. — 32 с.
