= Andriy Yermak =

Ukrainian film producer and politician (born 1971)

- Андрій Єрмак
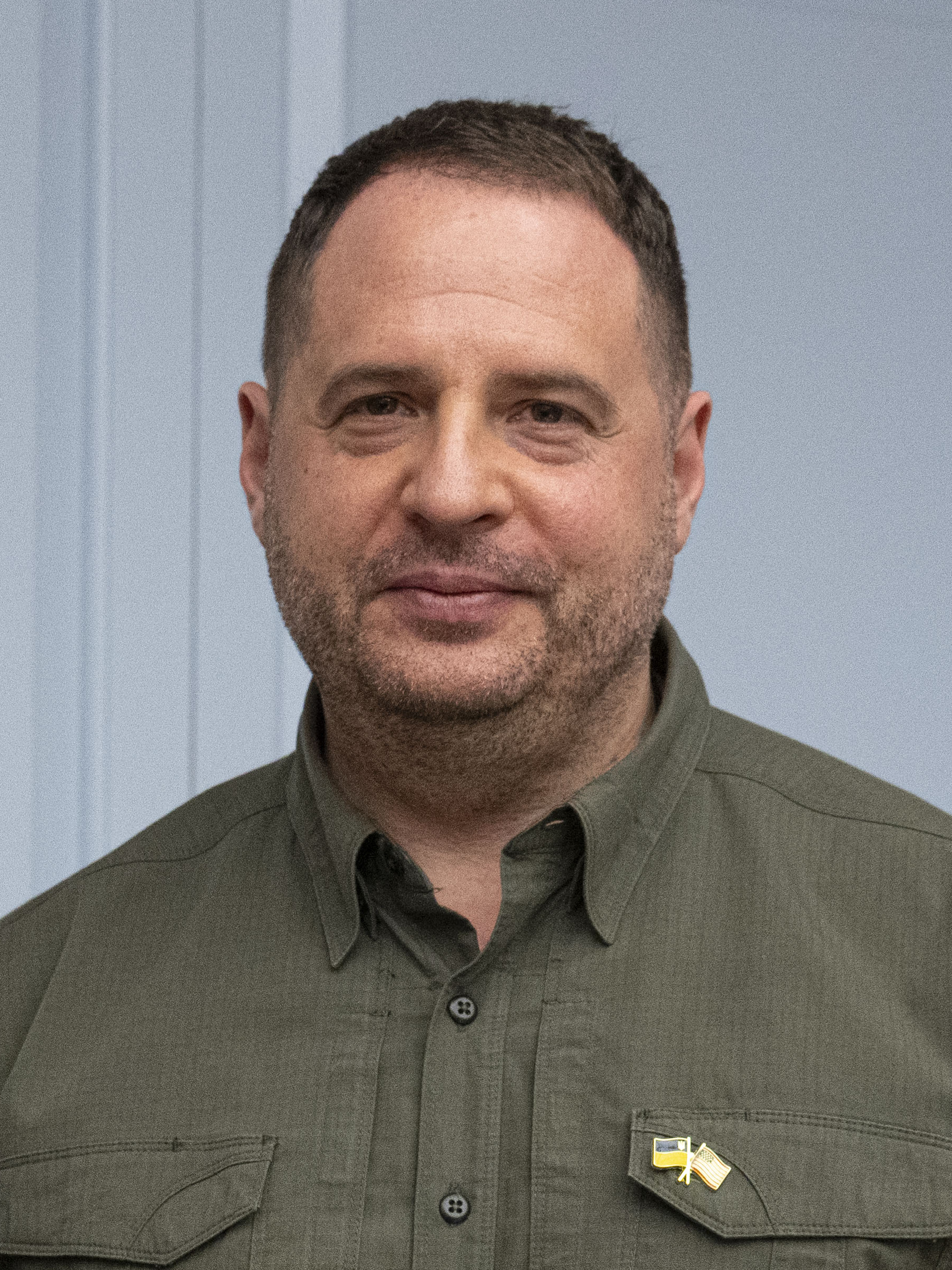
- Yermak in 2023

Head of the Office of the President of Ukraine
- In office 11 February 2020 – 28 November 2025
- President: Volodymyr Zelenskyy
- Preceded by: Andriy Bohdan
- Succeeded by: Kyrylo Budanov (2026)

Member of the National Security and Defense Council of Ukraine
- Incumbent
- Assumed office 12 February 2020

Member of the Headquarters of the Supreme Commander-in-Chief
- Incumbent
- Assumed office 24 February 2022
- Preceded by: Office established

Chief of staff of the Coordination Headquarters for Humanitarian and Social Affairs
- Incumbent
- Assumed office 2 March 2022
- Preceded by: Office established

Personal details
- Born: 21 November 1971 (age 54) Kiev, Ukrainian SSR, Soviet Union (now Kyiv, Ukraine)
- Party: Independent
- Relations: Denys Yermak, brother
- Education: Taras Shevchenko National University (Institute of International Relations)
- Occupation: Politician
- Profession: Lawyer, film producer, civil servant
- Known for: Time-100 Most Influential People (2024 nominee)
- Cabinet: Svyrydenko Government; Shmyhal Government; Honcharuk government
- Portfolio: The Line (2017 film), Rules of the Fight, Squat32, Forebodings

Andriy Borysovych Yermak (Ukrainian: Андрій Борисович Єрмак; born 21 November 1971) is a Ukrainian politician and former film producer who served as the head of the Office of the President of Ukraine from 2020 to 2025.

As head of the presidential office, Yermak was a member of the Headquarters of the Supreme Commander-in-Chief, the highest command and control body for the Armed Forces of Ukraine. He was described as Volodymyr Zelenskyy's right-hand man and a "real power broker" in Ukraine. In 2023, Politico called him Kyiv's "Green Cardinal". In 2024, Time magazine named Yermak to the Time 100 list of the most influential people in the world.

On 28 November 2025, Yermak resigned from his position as the head of the Office of the President of Ukraine after his home was raided by anti-corruption agents. He was formally removed from the Headquarters of the Supreme Commander-in-Chief and the National Security and Defense Council of Ukraine by presidential decree on 6 December 2025.

On 2 January 2026, Kyrylo Budanov was appointed to replace Andriy Yermak as the Head of the Office of the President of Ukraine.

== Biography ==
Andriy Yermak was born on 21 November 1971 in Kyiv, Ukraine (then part of the Soviet Union). Yermak's Russian mother Maria met his Kyiv native father Borys on a school trip of a Leningrad school to Kyiv. Yermak's father is Jewish. They met through mutual acquaintances. The couple married in 1971, and she moved to Kyiv. Yermak has a brother Denys, who is eight years younger.

In 1995, Yermak graduated from Kyiv's Taras Shevchenko National University's Institute of International Relations with a master's degree in international private law. The same year he received his license for law practice. In his second year of university, at the request of one of his professors, he started working for the "Proxen" law firm.

In 1997, Yermak founded his own law firm and worked in the field of intellectual property and commercial law. He also became a member of the Association of Lawyers of Ukraine during that time. Between 2006 and 2014 he, in his profession as lawyer, aided Party of Regions MP Elbrus Tedeyev. In 2009, he founded and headed the public organization "Association of Entrepreneurs of the City of Kyiv". In the 2010 Ukrainian presidential election, he was a proxy of candidate Arseniy Yatsenyuk in Kyiv's 216th constituency. In 2011 he became the head of the “Association of Small Business Owners”.

He also founded the Garnet International Media Group in 2012 and is the producer of such films as Rules of the Fight and The Line. He is a member of the Ukrainian Film Academy, and a member of the European Film Academy (2017).

Yermak became acquainted with Volodymyr Zelenskyy in 2011, when Zelenskyy was the general producer of the TV channel Inter. The two became friends. He worked in Zelenskyy's election campaign team in the 2019 Ukrainian presidential election. On 21 May 2019, newly elected President Zelenskyy appointed Yermak as Presidential Aide for Foreign Policy Issues. In this role he negotiated major prison exchanges with Russia during the war in Donbas. He became the main point of contact between Ukraine and US President Trump's circle, and was the point of contact for Kurt Volker and Rudy Giuliani on behalf of Zelenskyy during the buildup of the Trump–Ukraine scandal. Yermak promised that, in response to their request, Zelenskyy would publicly pledge to investigate Burisma, a company that employed Hunter Biden. However, Zelenskyy never made such a public statement.

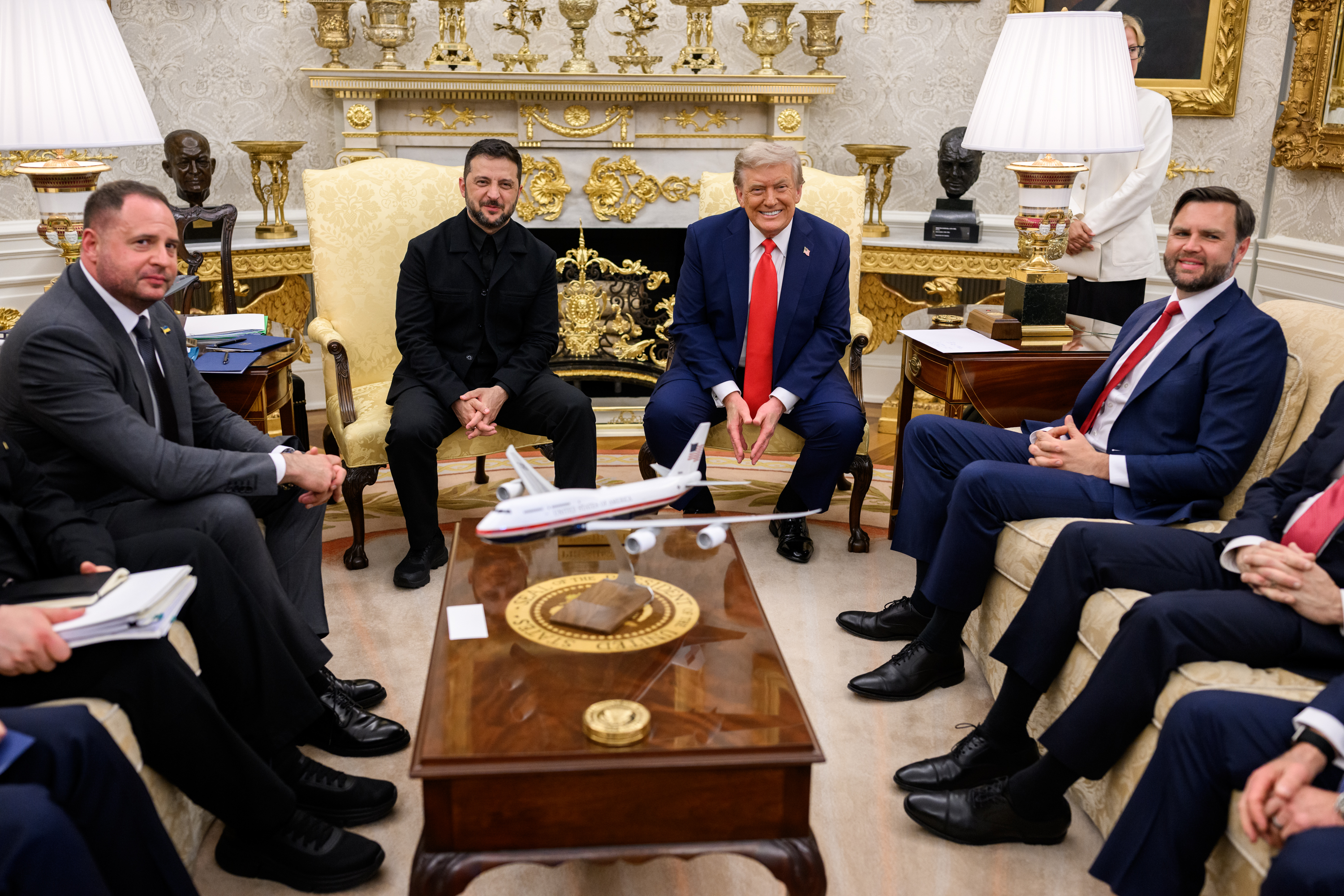
Yermak at a meeting of President Trump and President Zelenskyy in the White House on 18 August 2025

President Zelenskyy appointed Yermak as Head of the Office of the President of Ukraine on 11 February 2020. He became a member of the National Security and Defense Council the following day. As the Head of the President's Office, he provides administrative, legal, consultative, advisory, media, analytical and other assistance and support to the President. Yermak was appointed chairman of the Coordination Headquarters for Humanitarian and Social Affairs on 2 March 2022.

Citing unnamed Ukrainian officials involved in military planning, the Financial Times reported that he was a major proponent of the defence of Bakhmut in 2022, against frontline commanders who urged a strategic retreat. On 20 December, Zelenskyy and Yermak made a risky visit to the Bakhmut frontline. By June 2023, Russian forces had captured Bakhmut following a major battle.

In 2023, Politico called him Kyiv's "Green Cardinal", commanding both private and public arenas in his olive-colored combat fatigues.

In 2024, the Financial Times wrote that he had a major influence on Ukraine's foreign relations and drafted peace plans, often acting with presidential authority, and stated "among Ukrainians, foreign leaders and diplomats, he is a person of immense and polarising influence." Detractors stated that Yermak was eroding democratic checks and balances. Time named Yermak to their 2024 annual list of the 100 most influential people in the world. In 2025, The Kyiv Independent reported that officials said Yermak was regarded unfavorably in EU and U.S. political circles, and that in Ukraine his reputation was even worse.

In summer 2025, as anti-corruption watchdogs began targeting presidential insiders, Yermak and Zelenskyy's office supported legislation to place NABU and the Specialized Anti-Corruption Prosecutor's Office under the politically appointed prosecutor general; the effort sparked the first major anti-government street protests since Russia's full-scale invasion began in 2022, and Zelenskyy reversed course amid EU pressure. Two weeks before Yermak's dismissal, the anti-corruption agencies dismantled an alleged criminal organization involving current and former energy officials, government ministers, and a former deputy prime minister in a widening of the ongoing $100 million energy sector corruption scandal.

On 28 November 2025, Yermak's apartment was raided by agents from NABU and the Specialized Anti-Corruption Prosecutor's Office, amid the ongoing Operation Midas. Later that day, Zelenskyy dismissed Yermak as head of the presidential office. In May 2026, Yermak was formally named a suspect in a corruption investigation.

== Personal life ==
Yermak has lived in Kyiv his whole life. He is single and has no children.

== See also ==
- Yermak-McFaul Expert Group on Russian Sanctions
- Timur Mindich

Political offices
Preceded by Andriy Bohdan	Head of the Presidential Office; 2020–2025	Succeeded by Kyrylo Budanov
