= Venkatesh Narayanamurti =

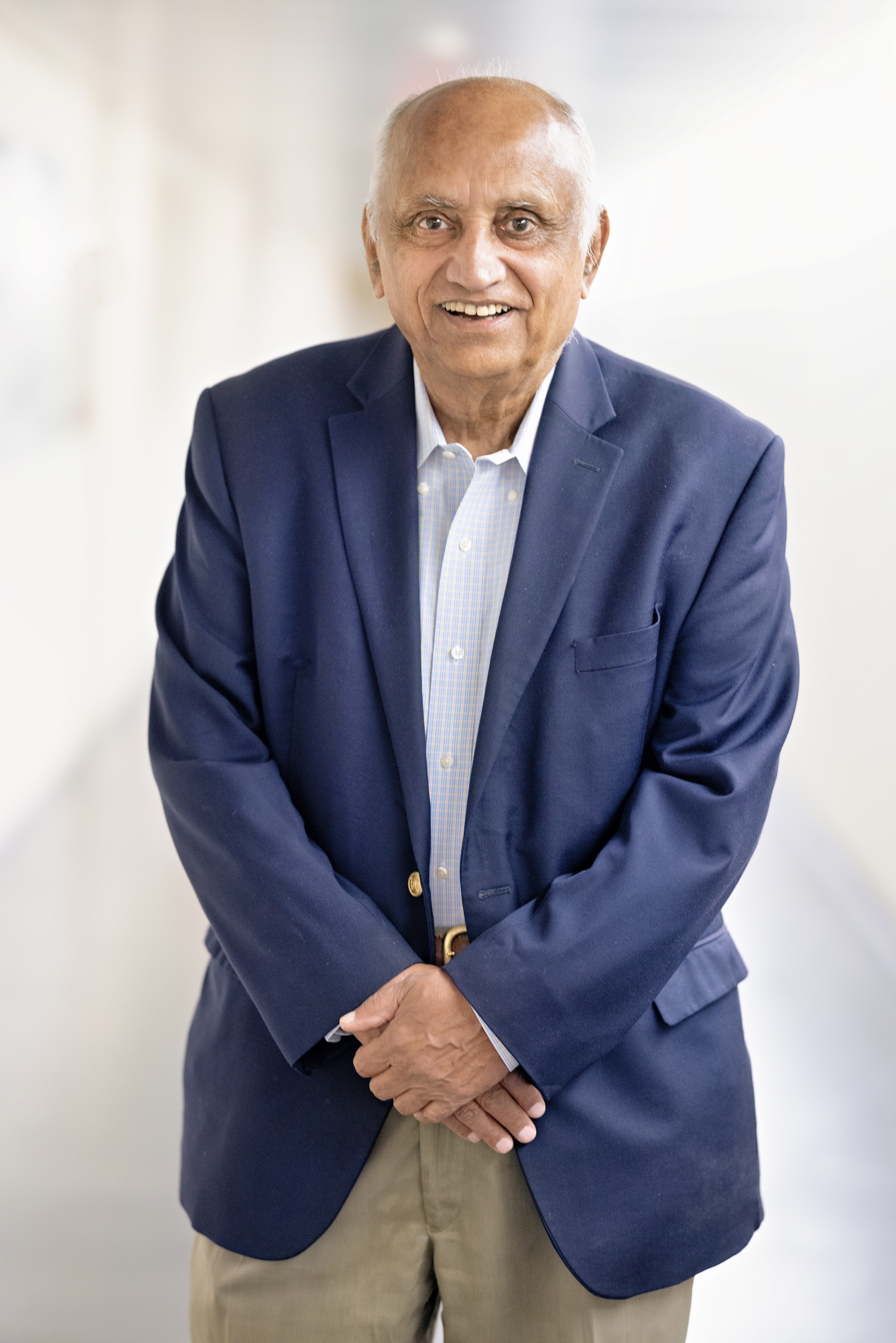
Venkatesh Narayanamurti in 2023

Venkatesh Narayanamurti is an American scientist, public policy leader and academic administrator.

He studied physics at St. Stephen's College, Delhi, where he gained his bachelor's degree in 1958 and a master's degree in 1960. He was awarded a PhD by Cornell University in 1965.

Narayanamurti is the Benjamin Pierce Research Professor of Technology and Public Policy at Harvard University where he is a former dean (1998–2008) of the School of Engineering and Applied Sciences. Narayanamurti was elected to membership in the National Academy of Engineering in 1992 for "developments in the field of phonon optics and leadership in electronic materials and device research and development". He also served on the Engineering and Computer Science jury for the Infosys Prize from 2011 to 2015.

== Publications ==
- Narayanamurti, Venkatesh; Odumosu, Toluwalogo (2016). Cycles of Invention and Discovery: Rethinking the Endless Frontier. Harvard University Press. ISBN 9780674967960.
- Narayanamurti, Venkatesh; Tsao, Jeffrey Y. (2021). The Genesis of Technoscientific Revolutions: Rethinking the Nature and Nurture of Research. Harvard University Press. ISBN 9780674251854.
