= Ukraine WOW =

Interactive exhibition

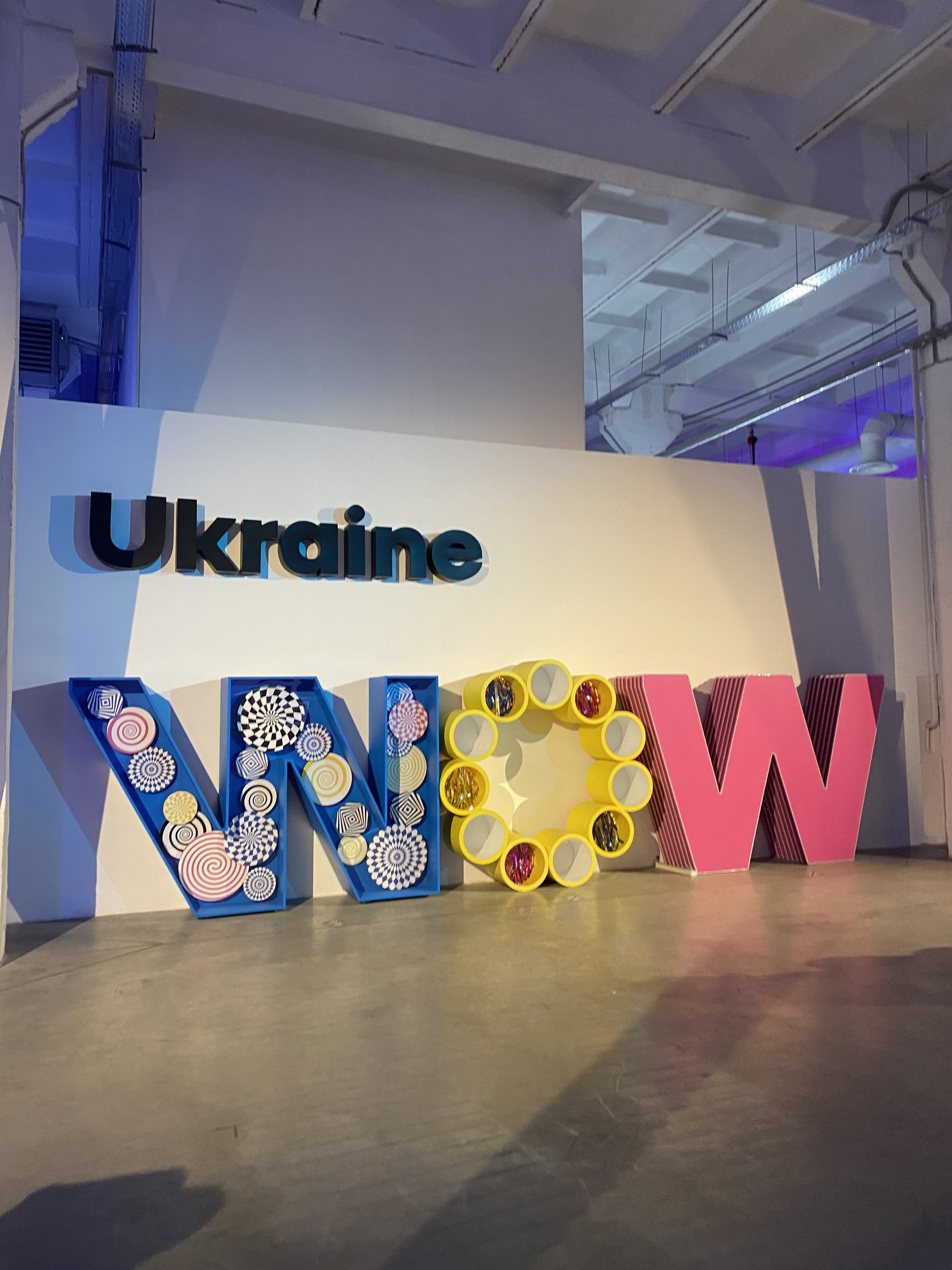

Ukraine WOW is an interactive exhibition created by Ukrzaliznytsia on the occasion of the opening of a new exhibition space at Kyiv's Central Railway Station. It was held from 14 November 2019 to 12 March 2020. Ukraine WOW became the largest exhibition project in Ukraine — more than 333,000 people visited it in four months, which allowed the exhibition to enter the National Register of Records of Ukraine.

== Aims ==
The main goal of Ukraine WOW was to acquaint visitors with the geography, industry, history, and culture of Ukraine. The exhibition was designed to tell about all the best that is in Ukraine, and to inspire Ukrainians to actively travel and study within Ukraine.

== Description ==
The total area of the exhibition was more than 3900 m2. The Hres Todorchuk agency worked on the concept and implementation of the project. The heads of the project were Yaroslava Hres and Yuliya Solovei; the curators were the art critic Ksenia Malykh and the literary critic Yevhenii Stasinevych. The visual identity was developed by the Banda agency. In total, more than 200 people worked on Ukraine WOW.
