= Yermak-McFaul Expert Group on Russian Sanctions =

Zelenskyy administration investigations team formed to counter Ukraine's invasion

The Yermak-McFaul Expert Group on Russian Sanctions is an international group of independent experts working on the implementation of sanctions against Russia and Belarus as a response to the Russian invasion of Ukraine. The Yermak-McFaul Expert Group publishes documents, strategies and roadmaps that contain plans and recommendations for sanctions against Russia and Belarus and monitors their effectiveness. The Group's work is used by the officials of the sanction coalition. Many experts of the Group were sanctioned by Russia.

The Yermak-McFaul Expert Group was created at the initiative of President Volodymyr Zelenskyy. It is led by the Head of the Presidential Office of Ukraine Andrii Yermak and the Director of the Freeman Spogli Institute for International Studies (FSI) Michael McFaul. The analytical materials for the group are provided by the KSE Institute, the Institute for International Finance, the Yale School of Management, as well as the Economists for Ukraine association. The KSE Institute is mandated by the government and Presidential Office of Ukraine to monitor the implementation of sanctions, analyse their effectiveness and prepare other analytical documents on the need to introduce new restrictions on the Russian economy.

== List of documents ==
- Plan of action to strengthen sanctions against the Russian Federation
- Roadmap of energy sanctions
- Roadmap of individual sanctions
- Roadmap of financial sanctions, etc.
- Working Group Paper #5 The Case for Designating the Russian Federation as a State Sponsor of Terrorism
- Working Group Paper #6 Why and How to Confiscate Russia's Sovereign Assets to help Rebuilt Ukraine
- Working Group Paper #7 IT & Supporting Technologies: Recommendations for Sanctions against the Russian Federation
- Working Group Paper #8 Rosatom and Civilian Nuclear Power: Recommendations for Sanctions against the Russian Federation
- Working Group Paper #9 Measures to Increase The Effectiveness of Sanctions
- Working Group Paper #10 Implementation of the Oil Price Cap
- Working Group Paper #11 Action Plan 2.0 Strengthening Sanctions against the Russian Federation
- Working Group Paper #12 Strengthening Sanctions to Stop Western Technology from Helping Russia's Military Industrial Complex
- Statement from the International Working Group on Russian Sanctions on the G-7 Summit
- Statement on Sixth Sanction Package
- Statement on European Energy Security and Siemens Turbines
- Statement on Why Russia Should Be Excluded from the Financial Task Force on Money Laundering (FATF)
- The International Working Group on Russian Sanctions Calls for Introducing a Low Price Cap on Russian Oil Products

== The purpose and composition of the group ==
The purpose of the Yermak-McFaul Expert Group is to provide a comprehensive list of possible economic and political measures to strengthen the sanctions of the United States, Europe and the world against Russia and Belarus.

The Group includes more than 100 experts, most of whom come from the US and Ukraine. Among them are Swedish-American economist and diplomat Andres Oslund, former US Ambassador to Ukraine William B. Taylor Jr., American political sociologist Larry Diamond, American philosopher, political economist and publicist Francis Fukuyama, Honorary President of the Kyiv School of Economics Tymofiy Mylovanov, KSE Institute Head Natalia Shapoval, Director General of Naftogaz of Ukraine Yuriy Vitrenko, former head of Oshchadbank Andriy Pyshnyi, chairman of the economic affairs committee of the Verkhovna Rada of Ukraine Dmytro Natalukha, prominent Ukrainian journalist Serhiy Leshchenko, Ambassador extraordinary and plenipotentiary Oksana Markarova, as well as Russian economists Sergey Aleksashenko and Sergey Guriev. Group secretaries: Vladyslav Vlasyuk from the Ukrainian side and Bronte Kass from the US side. Daria Zarivna, communications manager of the international working group of independent experts on sanctions against Russia. Experts will always comment on sanctions implied, and on impact on Russian's economy.

== Published sanctions documents ==
On April 20, 2022, the Expert Group published an Action Plan for Strengthening Sanctions against the Russian Federation. The document contains recommendations for the international democratic community regarding further sanctions and economic measures, designed to force the Russian leadership in the shortest possible time to end the war in Ukraine and to punish those who committed war crimes.

The plan covers ten key areas of sanctions policy, including: expansion of oil and gas sanctions; recognition of Russia and Belarus as states that sponsor terrorism; strengthening individual sanctions against persons who support the war; expansion of export control measures and imports.

On May 10, 2022, the Expert Group published a Roadmap on Energy Sanctions. The document defines proposals, including specific mechanisms, to provide a step-by-step guide to the introduction of a complete ban on imports of all Russian oil and a gradual embargo on gas imports from the Russian Federation. The road map also provides strategies and recommendations to reduce European dependence on Russian energy resources and counteract the Russian government's weaponisations of energy resources.

On June 6, 2022, the Expert Group presented a Roadmap on Individual Sanctions. The document defines the purpose of these sanctions and the principles behind their application, outlines categories of people on whom personal sanctions should be imposed, and proposes a strategy for strengthening sanction pressure. The list of recommended candidates subject to sanctions contains close to 12,000 individuals and 3,000 legal entities. As stated in the document, the 100 richest people listed by the Russian edition of Forbes are a key sanctions priority.

On June 23, 2022, the Expert Group presented a Roadmap on Financial Sanctions, which provides an analysis of the impact of previously imposed restrictions on the financial system of the Russian Federation, a list of recommendations for increasing pressure on the aggressor state, and a risk card, detailing the implementation of sanction policy. The map defines the three main steps of a specific sanctions policy: to impose full blocking sanctions on the 30 largest Russian banks with state capital; to completely block access to services and cooperation with the aggressor in the financial sphere; to introduce strict tools to monitor the execution of sanctions.

The document also offers new directions for increasing market and public pressure on companies that cooperate with Russia, through the introduction of new transparency limits and the public disclosure of these organizations.

On April 25, 2023, the Yermak-McFaul International Expert Group presented a new action plan for strengthening sanctions against Russia, Action Plan 2.0, which was a continuation of the plan published last year. The role of this document as a basis for the introduction of important sanctions was noted by the Head of the Office of the President. He is convinced that the new plan should be communicated as soon as possible to world leaders and relevant organizations that take care of the issue of imposing sanctions.

== The main directions of sanction policy ==
The Action Plan on Strengthening Sanctions Against the Russian Federation, presented on April 20, 2022, proposes ten main strands of sanctions policy:

1. Expansion of oil and gas sanctions: full ban and oil embargo, additional import duties on Russian energy and EU plan to provide gas supply.
2. Expansion of transport and insurance sanctions: prohibition of maritime, ground and rail transport from Russia.
3. Introduction of new financial sanctions: deepen measures to disconnect all Russian financial institutions from the global financial system.
4. International recognition of Russia as a state sponsor of terrorism.
5. Strengthening individual sanctions against certain categories of persons: impose sanctions on major figures in the government, media and institutional spheres and their families.
6. Strengthening sanctions on state-owned enterprises.
7. Expanding export control measures and import prohibitions: prohibit exports to Russia of all strategically important high-tech products.
8. Secondary sanctions: be prepared to impose secondary sanctions on any financial institution or company that, by its activities, provides a service to Russia-related businesses which was previously provided by a member of the sanction coalition.
9. Increasing transparency to oblige legal entities and organizations to disclose information about existing business relations with enterprises and their subsidiaries in Russia and Belarus.
10. Deepening of sanctions coordination; linking of the sanctions lifting with the achievement of peace and subsequent reconstruction.

== Results ==
Andriy Yermak emphasized that the group achieved an embargo on Russian oil and oil products, their price caps, full blocking sanctions against about 20 of the largest Russian banks, and Russia's deprivation of all rights in the FATF. In addition, an unprecedentedly wide list of dual-use goods was subject to trade restrictions, individual sanctions were imposed on thousands of individuals from various fields, and a coordination mechanism for the implementation of the G7 sanctions was created.
