= Robert Wichard Pohl =

German physicist (1884–1976)

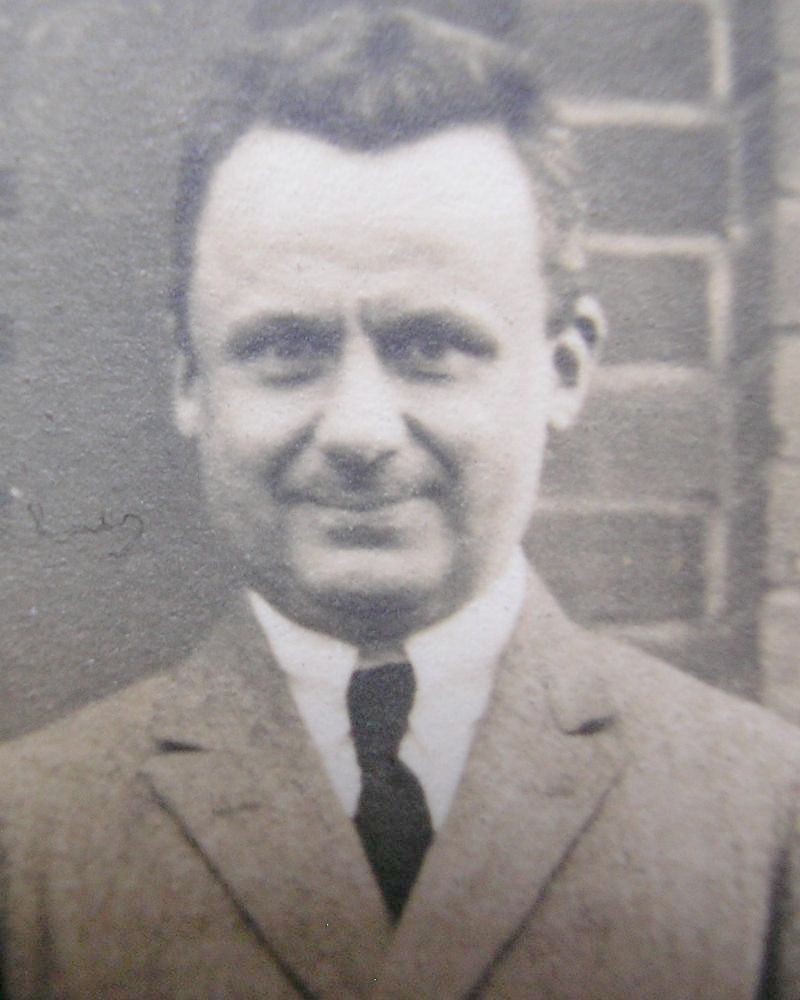
- Robert Pohl, Göttingen 1923
- Born: Robert Wichard Pohl; 10 August 1884; Hamburg, German Empire
- Died: 5 June 1976 (aged 91); Göttingen, West Germany
- Education: University of Heidelberg; Humboldt University of Berlin
- Known for: F-center
- Children: Robert Otto Pohl
- Relatives: Erwin Madelung (brother-in-law)
- Scientific career
- Fields: Solid state physics
- Workplaces: Humboldt University of Berlin; University of Göttingen
- Doctoral advisor: Emil Warburg

Robert Wichard Pohl (10 August 1884 – 5 June 1976) was a German physicist and professor of the University of Göttingen. The physical institute in Göttingen led by Pohl was one of the first schools in solid state physics and Nevill Francis Mott described Pohl as the "father of solid state physics.". He is known for relating color in alkali metal halides with the presence of vacancies and F-centers (also called color centers), a type of crystallographic defect. He also demonstrated the first transistor based on color centers. The Gudden–Pohl effect and the Pohl torsion pendulum (Pohl wheel) are named after him.

== Early years and education ==
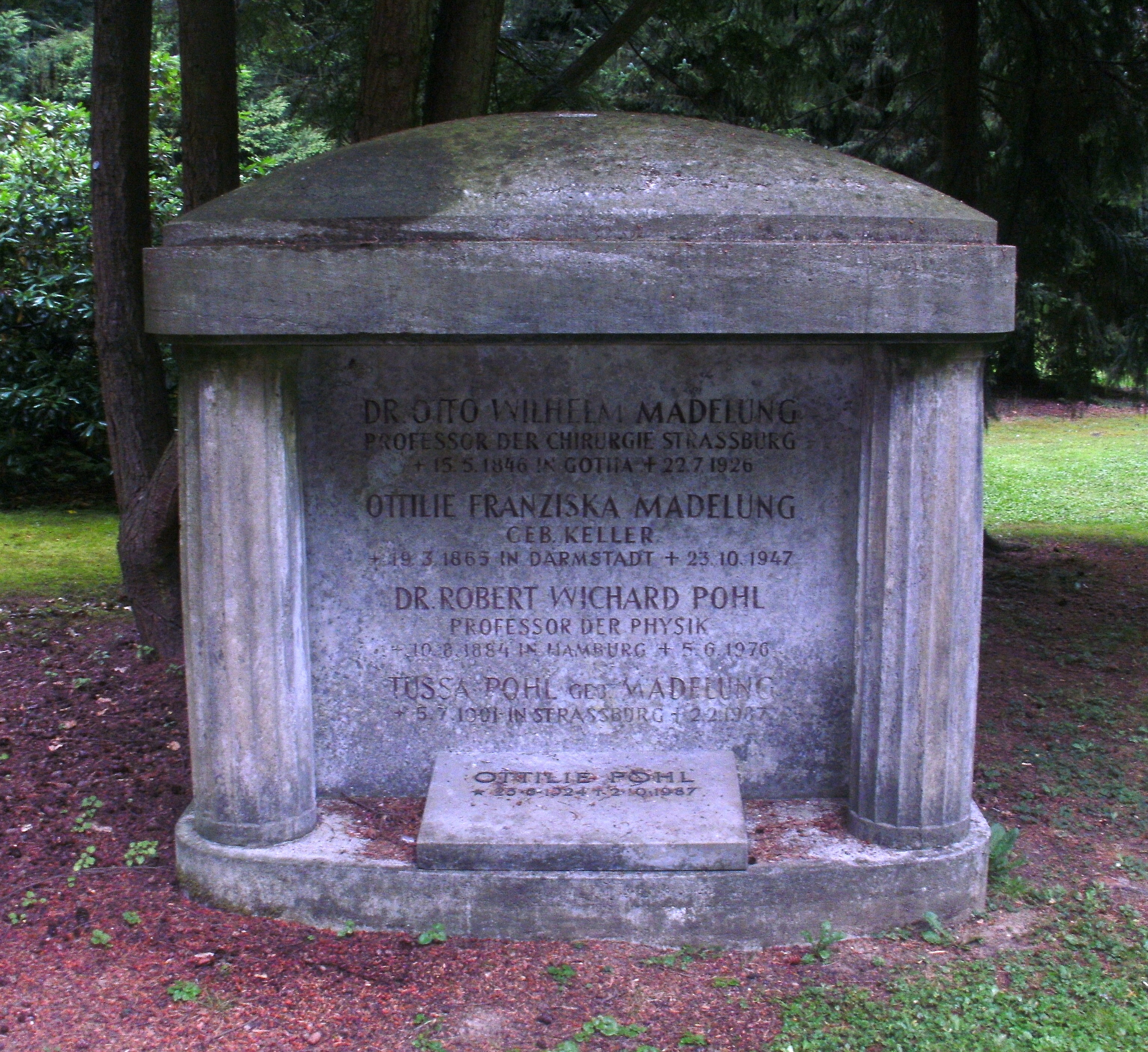
Göttingen, City Cemetery: The gravestone of Prof. Robert Wichard Pohl and his father-in-law, Prof. Otto Wilhelm Madelung, as well as their wives, Tussa Madelung Pohl and Ottilie Franziska Madelung, and the Pohls' daughter, Ottilie Pohl.

Robert Wichard Pohl was born in Hamburg as the son of the naval engineer Eugen Robert Pohl and his wife Martha. She was the daughter of Wichard Lange, founder of the private 'Dr. Wichard Lange School', and granddaughter of Wilhelm Middendorff, who founded the first German kindergarten, together with Friedrich Fröbel.

After completing the Dr. Wichard Lange School, Pohl entered the 'Gelehrtenschule des Johanneums' in 1895 and obtained his Abitur. In the summer semester of 1903, he enrolled for studies of natural science at the University of Heidelberg. There, he met James Franck, who up until Franck's death in 1964 remained a close friend. In the winter semester of 1903, Pohl transferred to the University of Berlin, where he majored in physics. Beginning in the summer semester of 1904, he had already begun scientific work in the Physics Institute with Emil Warburg on the topic which became his doctoral thesis. His first publication dates from this period, motivated by Bernhard Walter of the Hamburg State Physical Laboratory, where Pohl worked during his vacations, in particular attempting to observe the diffraction of X-ray radiation.

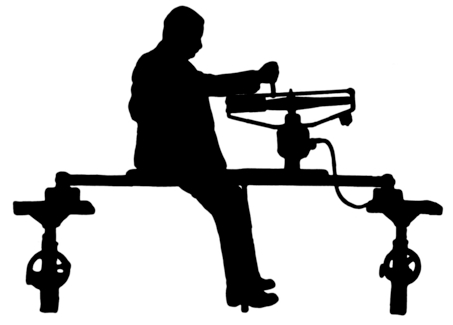
Monorail: RWP demonstrates the stabilization of a monorail vehicle using a gyroscope (R. W. Pohl, Mechanics. all editions).

== Career up to World War I ==
In the summer of 1906, Pohl completed his doctorate (Dr. Phil.) and took an assistantship in Berlin, working as instructor in the physics teaching labs under Heinrich Rubens, the Institute's director. He published joint articles with James Franck on ionic mobility in gases and on the propagation velocity of X-rays. From 1909 onward, he carried out research on the normal and the selective photoelectric effect in metals, and from 1910 he worked with Peter Pringsheim, on, among other things, the technically important problem of the fabrication of metal mirrors. In 1910, his monograph on the remote transmission of images appeared, and in 1912 he completed the Habilitation. In an addendum, his Habilitation thesis contains a discussion of Max von Laue's discovery of X-ray diffraction.

Following his Habilitation, Pohl began giving lecture courses on experimental physics, which also motivated him to start acquiring a private collection of lecture-demonstration apparatus. He also performed demonstration experiments at the meetings of the German Physical Society. By the outbreak of World War I, he had published 54 scientific articles and three books.

When war broke out, Pohl attempted unsuccessfully to volunteer for military service, but was refused for health reasons. His suggestion, together with Erich Regener, to set up and operate privately-funded diagnostic X-ray apparatus in two military reserve hospitals was gratefully accepted. In November 1914, he began cooperating with military radio operators on locating enemy transmission stations; this led to his appointment to a position as chief engineer with the rank of captain on the Board of Transport Examiners (VPK), which he held until the end of the war.

== Professorship in Göttingen ==
In February 1916, Pohl received the offer of an associate professorship at the University of Göttingen (as successor to Eduard Riecke), but due to the war, he was unable to accept the position until early 1919. In his baggage for the move to Göttingen were more than 40 boxes with apparatus for his lectures. Because of the offer of a professorship at the Technical University of Stuttgart in September 1919, Pohl was promoted to Full Professor in Göttingen in December 1920 and became director of the 1st Physical Institute there. In June, 1922, he was offered a position in Würzburg, which he also refused. Thus, he was a participant in the golden age of physics in Göttingen during the 1920s as one of the three full professors there, along with James Franck (director of the 2nd Physical Institute) and the theoretician Max Born.

On Christmas 1922, Pohl married Tussa Madelung, the sister of Erwin Madelung, who was a research assistant in Göttingen when Tussa moved there from Strasbourg with her family in May, 1920. Robert and Tussa had three children: Ottilie, Eleonore, and Robert Otto, later physics professor at Cornell University.

=== Color centers ===
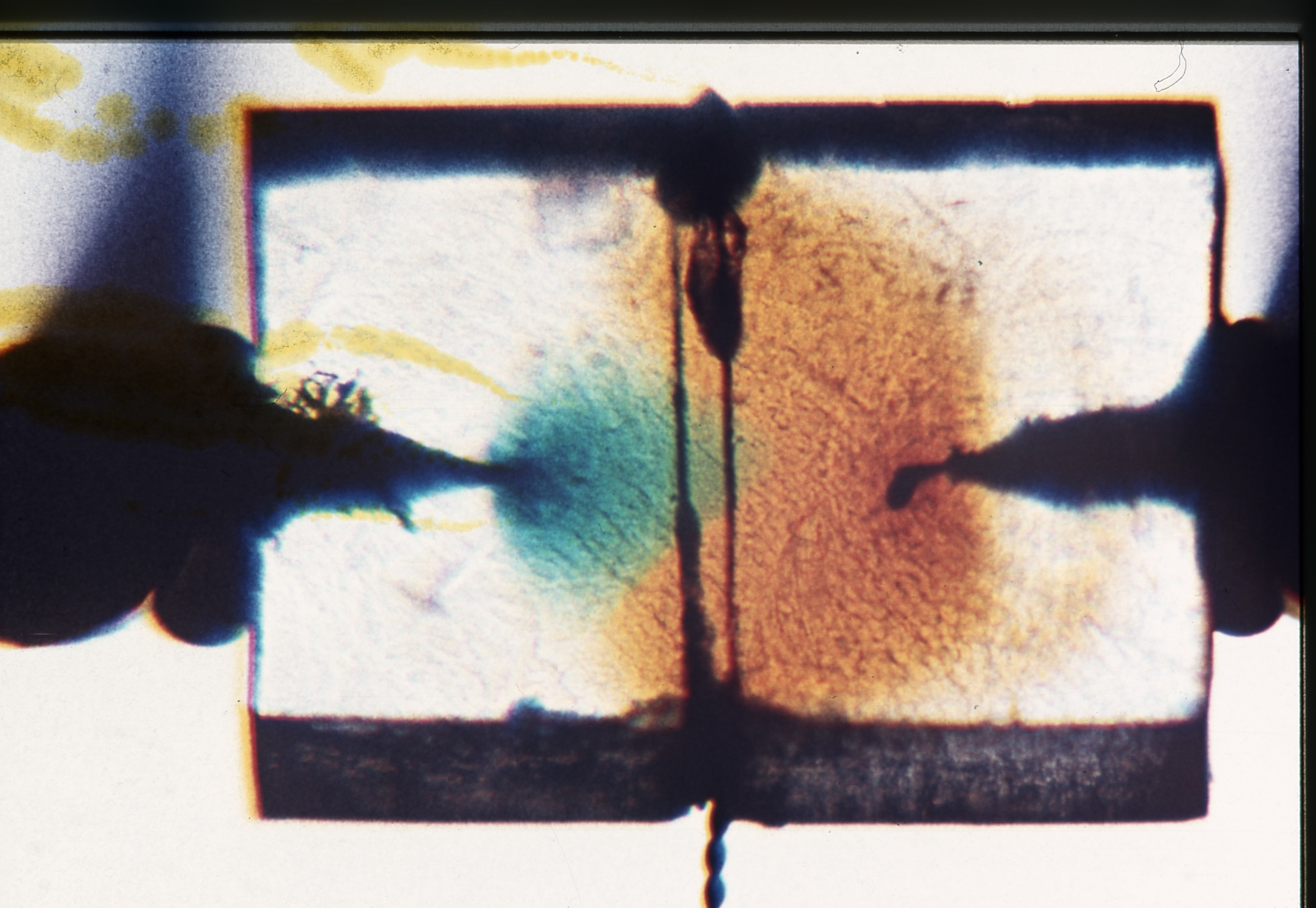
n- and p-type conduction: visualization of n-type conduction (at left by electrons, green) and of p-type conduction (at the right by holes, brown) in a KI crystal. The cathode (at left) and the anode (right) are Pt needles which have been melted into the crystal. From R.W. Pohl, Electromagnetism, from the 10th edition (1944) on.

Photoelectric observations – however not from surfaces, as in Berlin, but rather in bulk insulators – were started by Pohl together with his assistant Bernhard Gudden in 1919. (The research work from this period was described in detail in ^{(first part)}.) They discovered that diamond crystals become electrically conducting after irradiation with light. Later, they observed the same effect in the alkali halide sodium chloride; however only after it had been colored as a result of X-ray irradiation. Systematic observations of this coloration effect using artificially-prepared crystals led to the discovery of color centers, which were investigated in detail in the following years. By inserting three electrodes into a potassium bromide crystal, Pohl and Rudolf Hilsch were able to demonstrate the first model of a transistor based on color centers in 1938.

Alongside this research work in his own institute, Pohl collaborated with his scientific colleagues in a variety of ways. With the zoologist Alfred Kühn, he investigated the color perception of bees; for the chemist Adolf Windaus, he applied optical spectroscopy to the separation of Ergosterol from Cholesterol. He helped the archeologist Kurt Müller to photograph antique vases without disturbing highlights. He gave active support to his student Hans Joachim Pabst von Ohain when the latter began the first experiments on jet propulsion following completion of his doctoral thesis, in the Physics Institute but privately financed.

=== Introductory lecture courses on physics ===
For Pohl, the introductory lecture courses on physics were important from the very beginning; he frequently contributed new ideas for demonstration experiments, which he had developed and used in his lectures and textbooks, to the scientific literature. The first edition of his famous introductory texts in physics, his "Electromagnetism", was published in 1927. In 1930, the companion volume on "Mechanics and Acoustics" appeared, and it was extended from the third edition on to include "Thermodynamics". The third volume of the series, "Optics", was first published in 1941, and from the 9th edition in 1954 it was extended to include "Atomic Physics".

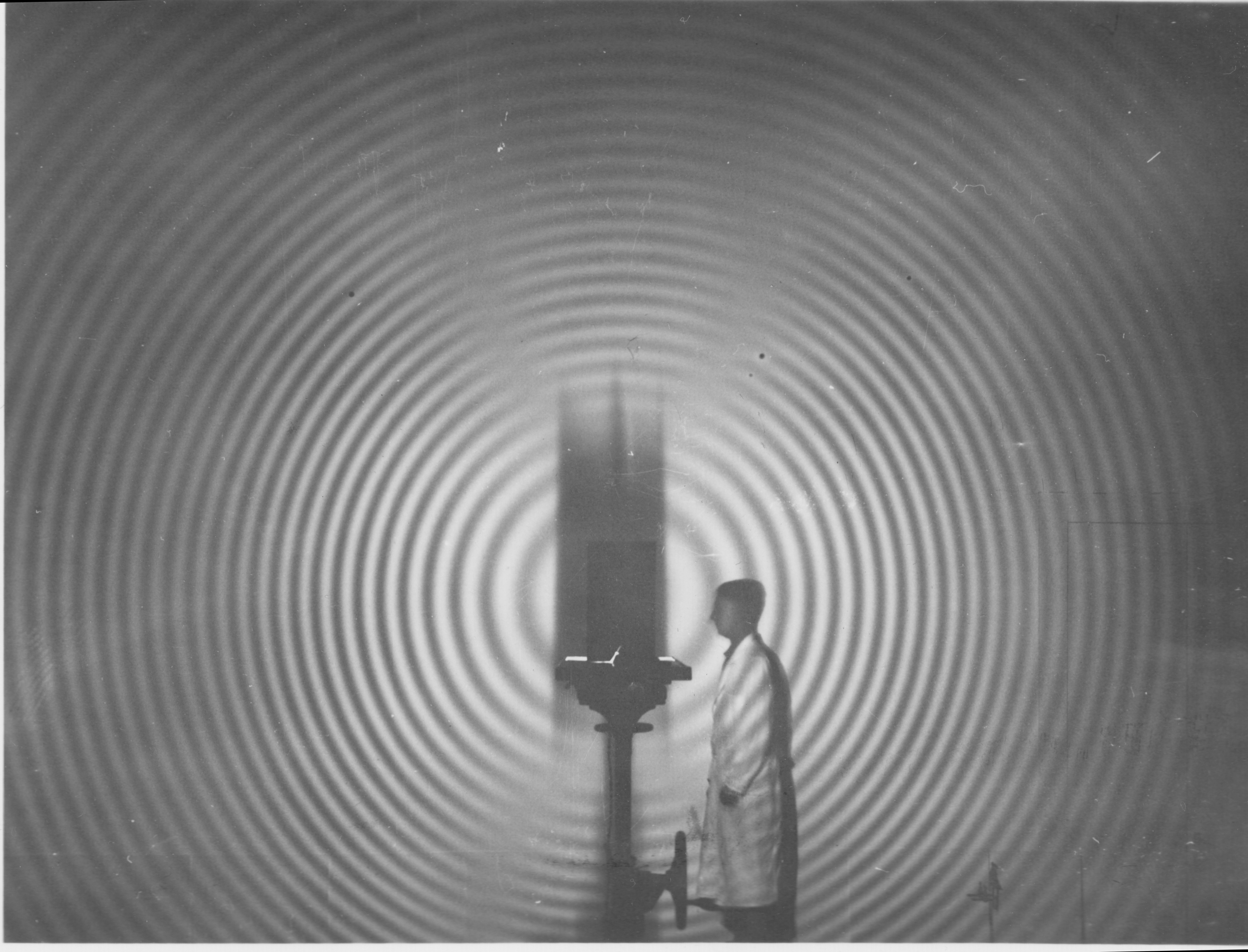
An intense spatial optical-interference field, projected onto the wall of the lecture hall (R.W. Pohl, "Optik", 1941. Since the 22nd edition in 2006 titled "Elektrizitätslehre und Optik")

Pohl torsion pendulum used to demonstrate harmonic motion, damping and chaotic motion.

A new chapter on "Quantum Optics of Solids" summarized the research work at Pohl's Göttingen Institute. The electrical properties of solids were treated in the volume on "Electromagnetism" as well, from the 15th edition (1955) on, including the results of Pohl's work in Göttingen. After his death in 1976, the three volumes were reduced to two and these chapters were removed. In their modern form, both volumes contain videos with all together 110 experiments, many carried out using Pohl's original apparatus. Volume two also includes a video with a biography of Pohl by Ekkehard Sieker (Video 1). It also includes a video on current amplification by a three-electrode crystal, and also an audio recording of the conferral of an honorary doctorate on Ernest Rutherford in Göttingen by the Dean Max Born (1931). The later editions of the textbooks were edited by Klaus Lüders and Robert Wichard Pohl's son Robert Otto Pohl.

== Post–World War II reception ==
Pohl's attitude towards the Nazi regime was described in his autobiographical résumé at the request of the occupying forces ^{(second part)}. According to this source, he never joined a political party, and his attitude towards the National Socialists ranged from reserved to hostile; he was convinced from the beginning of the eventual defeat of Germany in World War II (he had contacts to the Goerdeler Group; his contact, the teacher and lecturer Hermann Kaiser, was sentenced to death and was executed on the 23 January 1945 in Berlin-Ploetzensee). Following the war, he was active in re-establishing the University of Göttingen, until 1948 as a member of the Denazification Commission.

The work of Pohl's Institute became internationally known only shortly before the outbreak of World War II, when Pohl and his research assistant Hilsch were invited to a conference on The conduction of electricity in solids at Bristol in 1937. In 1946, the first review article on color centers appeared in the USA. This resulted in a 1951 invitation to the University of Illinois in Urbana, including visits to Bell Telephone Laboratories, the Naval Research Laboratory and other research institutes. On this occasion, Pohl once again encountered James Franck and they renewed their friendship which had been interrupted in 1933 by Franck's forced emigration. In 1956, the first International Color Center Conference took place at Argonne National Laboratory; it was repeated at three-year intervals in the following years until 1977.

Following his retirement in 1952, Pohl dedicated his time to improving his textbooks. In an interview with his former student Heinz Pick in 1974, he described some of his experiences at Göttingen in detail.

Pohl always kept his institute small. Of his 55 German Ph.D. students 11 later became professors at German universities, of the 7 foreign Ph.D. students, 6 became professors abroad.

In 1980 Nobel Prize in Physics laureate Nevill Mott summarized the significance of Pohl's research at Göttingen: "R.W. Pohl of Göttingen is in my view the real father of solid state physics."

== Honors and awards ==
- 1921 Member of the Göttingen Academy of Sciences
- 1928 Honorary doctorate (Dr.–Ing. e.h.) at the Technical University of Breslau
- 1935 Membership in the Leopoldina, Halle (Academy of Sciences)
- 1937 Member of the German Academy for Aeronautics Research
- 1939 Dr. h.c. at the University of Sofia
- 1945 Golden Society Medal of the Photographic Society in Vienna
- 1949 Corresponding member of the Bavarian Academy of Sciences
- 1950 Corresponding member of the Heidelberg Academy of Sciences
- 1953 Honorary Membership, American Association of Physics Teachers
- 1954 Cross of Merit (first class) of the Federal Republic of Germany
- 1957 Dr. rer. nat. h.c., Technical University of Darmstadt
- 1959 Oersted Medal of the American Association of Physics Teachers
- 1959 Dr. med. h.c. at the University of Göttingen
- 1964 Dr. rer. nat. h.c., University of Hamburg
- 1967 Cross of Merit (with star) of the Federal Republic of Germany
- 1971 Medal of Honor of the City of Göttingen
- 1975 Phillip Matthäus Hahn Medal of the German Society for Chronometry

Since 1979, the Robert Wirchard Pohl Prize for experimental physics and physics didactics has been awarded annually by the German Physical Society. Also since 1979, the Robert Wichard Pohl Institute at the Tongji University in Shanghai, supported by the Volkswagen Foundation, has borne his name. A bronze memorial plaque was placed in 1995 on his former residence in Göttingen, at Klopstockstr. 4.

Since 2007, the faculty of physics of the Göttingen University honors teachers for superior performance with the Robert Pohl medal.

== Textbooks ==
- Einführung in die Physik, Springer, Berlin (three-volume editions)
  - Volume 1
    - Mechanik und Akustik, (1st ed., 1930, 2nd ed., 1931)
    - Mechanik, Akustik und Wärmelehre, (3rd/ 4th ed., 1941 – 18th ed. (R.O. Pohl, editor), 1983)
  - Volume 2
    - Elektrizitätslehre, (1st ed., 1927 – 21st ed., 1975)
  - Volume 3
    - Optik, (1st ed. 1940 – 8th ed., 1948)
    - Optik und Atomphysik, (9th ed., 1954 – 13th ed., 1976)
- Einführung in die Physik, Springer, Berlin (two-volume editions)
  - Volume 1
    - Mechanik, Akustik und Wärmelehre, (19th ed. (K. Lüders und R.O. Pohl, eds.), 2004; 20th ed., 2009)
    - Mechanik, Akustik und Wärmelehre, (21st ed. 2017)
  - Volume 2
    - Elektrizitätslehre und Optik, (22nd ed. (K. Lüders und R.O. Pohl, eds., 2006); 23rd ed., 2010; 24th ed. 2017)

Both volumes appeared as English translations in 2017 and 2018.
