= Grain From Ukraine program =

Ukrainian program to provide humanitarian food aid

Grain From Ukraine
- Зерно з України
- Formation: November 26, 2022
- Purpose: Food security

Grain From Ukraine (Ukrainian: Зерно з України) is a humanitarian food program that was launched on November 26, 2022, on the 90th anniversary of the beginning of the Holodomor of 1932–1933, by the President of Ukraine, Volodymyr Zelenskyy, to supply grain to the poorest countries in Africa.

== History ==
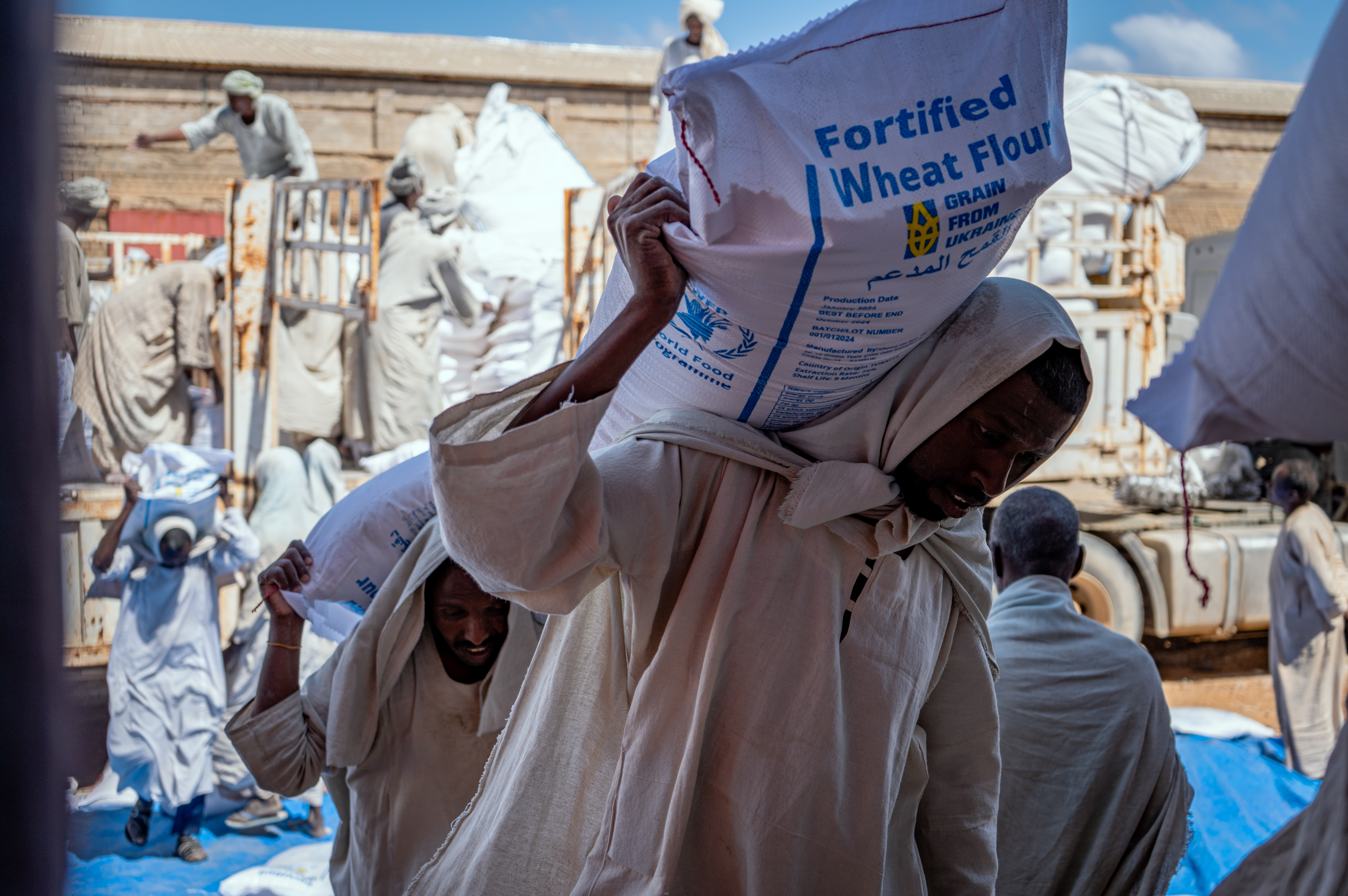
Wheat flour from Ukraine in Port Sudan, Sudan (February 2024)

Prior to the Russian invasion of Ukraine in 2022, Ukraine was one of the key World Food Programme grain suppliers and the world's 4th largest grain exporter. The country also accounted for over 15% of global corn exports, 10% of wheat, 15–20% of barley and over 50% of sunflower oil. The blockade of Ukrainian ports by the Black Sea Fleet in the first weeks of the full-scale invasion interrupted grain exports, rapidly increasing global food prices and fueling food crises, greatly increasing the risk of famine in the poorest countries.

David Beasley, the Executive Director of the UN World Food Programme, has estimated that the Russian invasion of Ukraine has pushed around 70 million people to the brink of starvation worldwide.

Grain exports from Ukraine were resumed within the Black Sea Grain Initiative in July and August 2022. From August to November 2022, over 11 billion tons of supplies went to 38 countries, and WFP and USAID resumed humanitarian shipments to the poorest countries.

The Grain from Ukraine program was proposed by the president Volodymyr Zelenskyy at the 2022 G20 Bali summit as a way to support humanitarian shipments to the countries in need and Ukrainian grain producers. The initiative was officially launched on November 26, 2022, at the International Summit on Food Security in Kyiv, held on the 90th anniversary of Holodomor.

Ukrainian authorities emphasized that the Grain from Ukraine program aims to highlight the role of Ukraine as a responsible member of the global community and to challenge the Russian propaganda which puts the blame for the food crises on Ukraine and its Western partners.

To date, the Grain from Ukraine program has accumulated financial support of around 220 million USD, and more than thirty countries and international organizations have joined the initiative. The Ukrainian Government is working to increase the number of donor countries participating and the financial contributions received to the program.

== Format ==
The goal of the Grain from Ukraine program is to prevent famine and provide food to no less than 5 million people in the poorest countries of Africa and Asia, such as the Democratic Republic of the Congo (DRC), Ethiopia, Sudan, Southern Sudan, Somalia, Yemen, Kenya, and Nigeria. Grain from Ukraine is due to be expanded, with support provided to more countries including Mozambique, Malawi, Madagascar, Djibouti, Liberia, Mauritania, Lebanon, and others.

Ukrainian authorities have scheduled around 60 shipments to take place under the program, each providing food to up to 90 thousand people. Donor countries purchase the grain from a separate pool, accumulating harvest from small and medium-sized farms. The freight costs are covered by the Grain from Ukraine program participants.

Since the start of the initiative, 170,000 tons of wheat have been sent to countries facing food insecurity and famine. Notable shipments include:

- In December 2022, a ship carrying 25,000 tons of wheat arrived at the port of Doraleh in Djibouti, bound for neighboring Ethiopia
- In March 2023, a vessel carrying 30,000 tons of wheat arrived in Mombasa, Kenya
- In February 2024, 7,600 tons of wheat flour arrived in Port Sudan, Sudan, providing support to those affected by the ongoing conflict in the country
- On 29 February 2024, a special event was held in Abuja, Nigeria, to welcome the arrival in the country of 25,000 tons of grain, which had landed at Port Harcourt the previous month. This will support those in Nigeria who are food insecure or displaced as a result of current conflict in the country

Ukraine has also established the International Co-ordination Group for the Prevention of Hunger, which includes representatives of governments, corporations and philanthropists who can directly influence the food needs of millions of people around the world. The Co-ordination Group will develop a joint global action program – a roadmap to prevent the global food crisis from worsening. The World Food Programme, together with Ukraine and donor countries, is identifying recipient countries for Ukrainian grain among those facing acute food shortages.

== Participants ==
Donations to Grain from Ukraine total around US$220 million from over 30 countries and international organizations.

- Ukraine purchased 50,000 tons of grain for the first two ships (around 420 million hryvnas); Germany and Japan paid for the freight.
- The European Commission donated funds to purchase 40,000 tons of grain. This came in addition to EUR 1 billion provided within the Solidarity Lanes food export program.
- USAID provided US$20 million in addition to US$173 million donated to WFP to purchase grain within the Black Sea Grain Initiative and over US$11 billion in humanitarian aid provided to the poorest countries in 2022.
- South Korea donated US$3 million via the WFP.
- Sweden donated SEK 100 million (US$9.5 million) in addition to SEK 400 million provided earlier to WFP.
- Other donors included Austria (US$3.9 million), the UK (US$6 million), Canada (US$30 million), Netherlands (US$4 million), France (US$20 million), as well as Germany, Qatar, Norway, Poland, Turkey, and Japan.

== 'Grain from Ukraine' ambassadors ==
As of March 2024, seven ‘Grain from Ukraine’ ambassadors have been appointed to promote the program and its impact on alleviating hunger around the world:

- Mohammad Abdullahi Omar, former Minister of Foreign Affairs of Somaliland
- Dr Joyce Banda, former President of Malawi
- Dr Christopher Fomunyoh, Regional Director of Central and West Africa Programs at the National Democratic Institute in the United States
- Dr Oby Ezekwesili, former Nigerian Minister of Education and former World Bank Vice President
- Charlotte Leslie, former member of the United Kingdom Parliament and current Director of the Conservative Middle East Council
- Manav Sachdeva, an academic with extensive experience of leading initiatives in developing countries and a former holder of senior positions in the UN
- Neven Mimica, the former Deputy Prime Minister of Croatia who has served as the European Commissioner for International Co-operation and Development since 2014

== See also ==
- Food security
- Black Sea Grain Initiative
- United States grain embargo against the Soviet Union
