= List of BMP-1 variants =

This is a complete list of formal variants and designations of the BMP-1 infantry fighting vehicle (IFV). It is sorted by country of origin. Many field modifications may exist that are not listed here.

== Variants ==
=== Soviet Union ===
==== Infantry fighting vehicles ====
- BMP (Ob'yekt 764) – The original main prototype of the BMP-1 was developed by the design bureau of the Chelyabinsk Tractor Works (ChTZ) and built in 1965. In comparison with Ob'yekt 765Sp1, Ob'yekt 764 was 4 mm higher, had a maximum swimming speed of 10 km/h, a lower maximum range (550 km on road) and a reduced number of firing ports for its passenger's armament (six). The vehicle had a curved shock-absorber behind the first road wheel and the rear fender and two tool stowage boxes on the fenders. To start production of the new vehicle, the design of the fighting and troop compartments were improved. Unlike the BMP-1, Ob'yekt 764 used a waterjet for swimming, which was removed to save space inside the vehicle. Ob'yekt 764 also had a larger main fuel tank, while the BMP-1 had the main fuel tank reduced in size and partially placed under the troop compartment.
  - Ob'yekt 765 – An improved Ob'yekt 764.
  - Ob'yekt 765 was fitted with an active location system for its eight passengers. It was developed in the mid-1960s. Its turret was moved to the rear of the hull. It was also fitted with three additional 7.62 mm PKT general-purpose machine guns in ball mounts in the middle of the hull. Three prototypes were built.
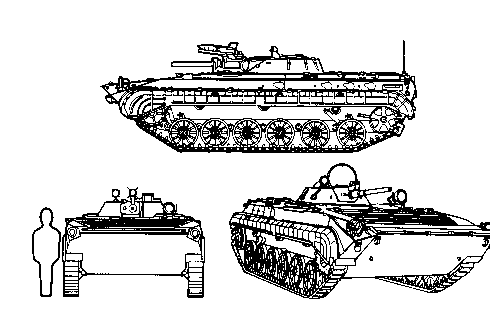
    Three views of the BMP-1 (Ob'yekt 765Sp1) graphic.
    - BMP (Ob'yekt 765Sp1) (Sp stands for spetsifikatsiya – specification) – An early type with a shorter nose section and a larger angled plate at the top of the hull line. The two tool stowage boxes on the fenders were removed. The swim vanes were modified by reducing the number of vanes from seven to four and the fender profile was raised nearer to the horizontal. The fume extraction ports on the hull roof to the rear of the turret were moved outwards and reoriented to point toward the rear of the vehicle. The single torsion bar used to spring the rear roof troop hatches was replaced by a twin torsion bar system. The firing ports on the side were moved up into the armor plate, giving the weapons used in the ports a higher degree of elevation. The vehicle weighs 12.6 tonnes. It was built from 1966 to 1969. It is sometimes incorrectly known as the BMP-A by some Western sources. NATO gave it the designation BMP Model 1966.
      - BMP-1 (Ob'yekt 765Sp2) – The standard production version weighs 13 tonnes. It was built from 1969 to 1973. Vehicles produced from the mid-1970s had a higher hull with more space inside as well as a different shaped nose section which also made it 20 cm longer, giving it an improved swimming capability. The triangular air intake behind the turret was replaced by a circular telescopic snorkel which was raised when the vehicle was afloat. The roof hatches were also slightly rearranged, the air intake located to the front left side of the driver's station was removed and the NBC sensor cover was moved inwards, closer to the turret. To the left of the turret was a prominent NBC filter cover and the PKM port was redesigned. NATO gave it the designation BMP Model 1970.
          - BMP-1 (Ob'yekt 765Sp3) – A slightly improved and 200 kg heavier version of Ob'yekt 765Sp2. Unlike its predecessors it had OG-15V HE-Frag rounds in its ammunition load. It was fitted with the new 1PN22M2 sight (with an additional tangent scale OG to be used with HE-Frags OG-15V rounds) instead of the 1PN22M1 sight as well as with a traffic signal system (six marker lights and one stop light). The MZ autoloader was removed. It was built from 1973 to 1979. NATO gave it the designation BMP M1976.
            - BMP-1S – The experimental prototype was equipped with the AV-1 device at the commander's station for target laser designation and for damaging enemy optics. Developed and tested in the 1970s, ammunition for the ATGM launcher was reduced from four to two 9M14Ms, as was the number of passengers (seven instead of eight).
            - BMP-1 (Ob'yekt 765Sp8) – This variant was additionally armed with a 30 mm AGS-17 "Plamya" automatic grenade launcher for which it carried 290 rounds. A large number of BMP-1 (Ob'yekts 765Sp1-765Sp3) IFVs were upgraded to this model during preventive and major repairs. Such IFVs carried up to seven troopers instead of eight. In Western sources they are sometimes called the "BMP-1G" but this is not an official Soviet designation. NATO gave it the name BMP M1979/1
            - BMP-1 – Fitted with six 81 mm 902V "Tucha" smoke grenade launchers at the rear of the turret. Western sources often call it the BMP-1M but this is not an official Soviet designation.
              - BMP-1 – Modernized by the Belarusian 140th Repair Workshop from Barysaw in Belarus during major repairs between the 1970s and 2000s. The modernization package included the pintle-mounted 9P135M-1 ATGM launcher capable of firing SACLOS guided 9M113 "Konkurs" (AT-5 Spandrel), 9M113M "Konkurs-M" (AT-5B Spandrel B), 9M111 "Fagot" (AT-4 Spigot) and 9M111-2 "Fagot" (AT-4B Spigot B) ATGMs as well as a new electronic pulsed infrared jam-resistant weapon system.
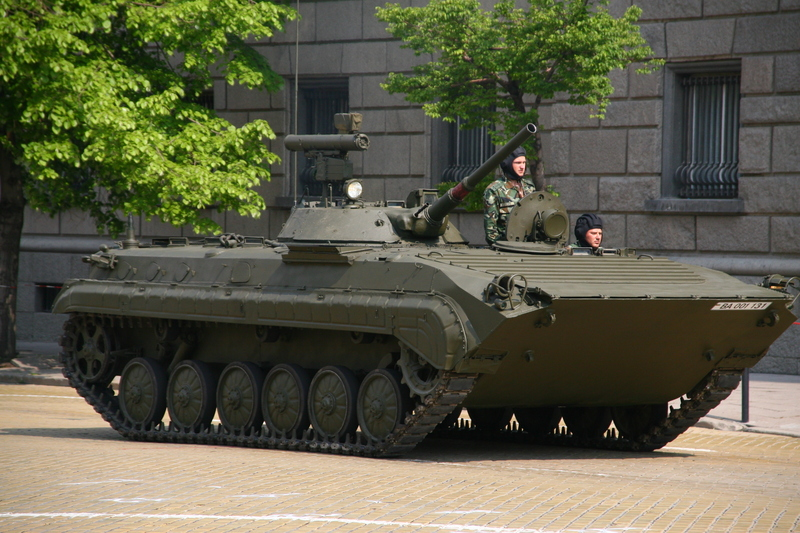
                Bulgarian BMP-1P during the Army Day military parade, 6 May 2009.
            - BMP-1P (Ob'yekt 765Sp4) – The first serious modernization of the BMP-1; it was developed in the middle of the 1970s after an analysis of BMP-1 combat use during the 1973 Yom Kippur War and during the Angolan Civil War three years later. Firepower was enhanced by adding the pintle-mounted 9P135M launcher with a semi-automatic control capable of firing SACLOS guided 9M113 "Konkurs" (AT-5 Spandrel) and 9M113M "Konkurs-M" (AT-5B Spandrel B) ATGMs which increased armor penetration and extended weapon range. The new ATGM launchers were somewhat difficult to operate since the gunner had to stand in the open hatch on top of the turret to use the weapons, exposing himself to hostile fire and in NBC conditions destroying whatever value the BMP-1P's NBC protection suite gave. The Malyutka loading hatch was usually welded shut and the mount was removed. A special NBC protection covering was placed on the inside and outside of the turret, hull, engine compartment upper access hatch, commander's and driver's hatches as well as under the driver's station. A new fire-extinguisher system for protection against napalm was installed after an analysis of armored fighting vehicle (AFV) usage during the Vietnam War. There is an additional machine gun firing port on the left side of the hull and at the front of the turret, increasing the number of firing ports from seven to nine. For protection against air attacks, two 9M32M "Strela-2M" (SA-7b "Grail" Mod 1) or 9M313 Igla-1 (SA-16 Gimlet) missiles of corresponding performance were added instead of the previous 9M32 "Strela-2", but sometimes they were replaced by an RPG-7 anti-tank rocket propelled grenade launcher. The BMP-1P weighs 13.4 tonnes. It was built from 1979 to 1983. NATO gave it the designation BMP M1981
              - BMP-1P (Ob'yekt 765Sp5) – It was a late production model fitted with six 81 mm 902V "Tucha" smoke grenade launchers at the rear of the turret and additional kovriki turret armor (some vehicles may lack either the grenade launchers or the additional turret armor). Some vehicles were equipped with a track-width KMT-10 mine plow. In Western sources, BMP-1Ps that were fitted with smoke grenade launchers are often called BMP-1PM but this is not an official Soviet designation. Sometimes a BMP-1P fitted with the KMT-10 is called the BMP-1PM1 and the BMP-1P fitted with additional kovriki turret armor is called the BMP-1PM2 but those are not official Soviet designations.
                - BMP-1PG (G stands for granatomyot – grenade launcher) is a BMP-1P armed additionally with an AGS-17 "Plamya"automatic grenade launcher on the left hand side of the top of the turret for which it carries 290 grenades. The BMP-1PG was inspired by self-made field modifications. Some crews participating in the Soviet–Afghan War welded a grenade launcher to the top of the turret in order to compensate for the quite low fragmentation effect of the OG15V HE-Frag round used by the main gun. The vehicle weighs 13.6 tonnes and can carry up to seven soldiers instead of the usual eight. A new 9K34 "Strela-3" man-portable air-defense system, was carried inside the troop compartment. A short production run took place at the end of the 1970s. The vehicle entered service with the Soviet Army but many were exported. NATO gave it the designation BMP M1979/2.
                - BMP-1PG (G stands for granatomyot – grenade launcher) – Modernization was carried out by the Kurgan Engineering Works. There are two variants. The first has tracks and drive sprockets from the BMP-2. The second is the same as the first except for minor chassis improvements and flotation sides-skirts/mudguards from the BMP-2 (many BMP-1Ps were converted into the second variant. They were also fitted with the whole fighting compartment from the BMP-2). The BMP-1PG is considered by the Russian Army, to be the same as the BMP-2, in terms of efficiency. Some BMP-1Ps were reengineered into BMP-1PGs by tank repair plants during scheduled major repairs, some – by the main manufacturer "Kurganmashzavod".
            - BMP-1D (D stands for "desantnaya" – assault) – This vehicle is a modernized BMP-1 built in 1982 for Soviet assault battalions serving in Afghanistan. It is often known as the "Afghan" variant. It has 5–6 mm thick appliqué steel armor on the sides of the hull as well as five plates per side covering the suspension and additional armor under the commander's and driver's seats for protection against mines. Because of this modification, the side armor of the BMP-1D is able to withstand 12.7 mm armor-piercing rounds fired by the DShK and Browning M2 heavy machine guns used by the Afghan Mujahideen, which can penetrate the side armor of the standard BMP-1, as well as larger artillery shell fragments. The additional armor has holes cut out to allow the transported infantry to use their small arms through the firing ports. Additional firing ports were added into the top hatches of the troop compartment and a stowage box was placed on the roof at the rear of the hull (some vehicles did not have it). The use of appliqué armor increased the ground pressure to 0.65 kg/cm^{2}, decreased the maximum range to 500 km and jeopardized the amphibious ability. The 9S428 ATGM launcher was often replaced by an AGS-17 "Plamya" automatic grenade launcher in field conditions.
  - Ob'yekt 768 – It was an experimental IFV utilizing parts of the BMP-1 developed and built in 1972. A new two-man turret armed with a 73 mm "Zarnitsa" semi-automatic smoothbore gun and a 12.7 mm coaxial heavy machine gun, was installed. The original design included a small rotating turret on top of the commander's hatch armed with a 7.62 mm PKT general-purpose machine gun but it was not included in the prototype. It was also armed with a pintle-mounted ATGM launcher capable of firing SACLOS guided 9M113 "Konkurs" (AT-5 Spandrel) and 9M113M "Konkurs-M" (AT-5B Spandrel) ATGMs. It carried 40 rounds for the main gun, 500 rounds for the coaxial machine gun and 4 ATGMs. Ob'yekt 768 had a significantly modified nose section and strengthened suspension with an additional road wheel. The track unit was equipped with hydrodynamic grills to increase swimming traction performance but it was decided to remove them because of the damage from stones. It weighed 13.6 tonnes and had a crew of three men (+ 7 troopers). The prototype is preserved at the Kubinka Tank Museum.
    - Ob'yekt 769 – An experimental IFV based on an Ob'yekt 768 chassis and built in 1972. It was fitted with a new turret armed with a 30 mm 2A42 autocannon and a 7.62 mm PKT coaxial machine gun. A second PKT was installed in a small rotatable turret on top of the hull. It was also armed with a pintle-mounted ATGM launcher capable of firing SACLOS guided 9M113 "Konkurs" (AT-5 Spandrel) and 9M113M "Konkurs-M" (AT-5B Spandrel) ATGMs. It carried 500 rounds for the main gun, 2000 rounds for the machine guns and four ATGMs. The track unit, with hydrodynamic grills, was used for swimming. It was fitted with a diesel engine developing 321 hp (239 kW), weighed 13.8 tonnes and had a crew of three (plus 7 troopers). The turret developed for the Ob'yekt 769 was later slightly improved and installed on the BMP-2. The prototype is preserved at the Kubinka Tank Museum.
  - Ob'yekt 680 was an experimental IFV utilizing parts of the BMP-1. It was developed and built in 1972. It weighed 13 tonnes and had a crew of 3 (plus 7 troopers). It was armed with a 30 mm 2A38 autocannon and a PKT machine gun fitted into a completely new turret. A second PKT machine gun was installed on top of the commander's hatch. It carried 500 rounds for the main gun and 4000 rounds for the machine guns. This prototype is preserved at the Kubinka Tank Museum.
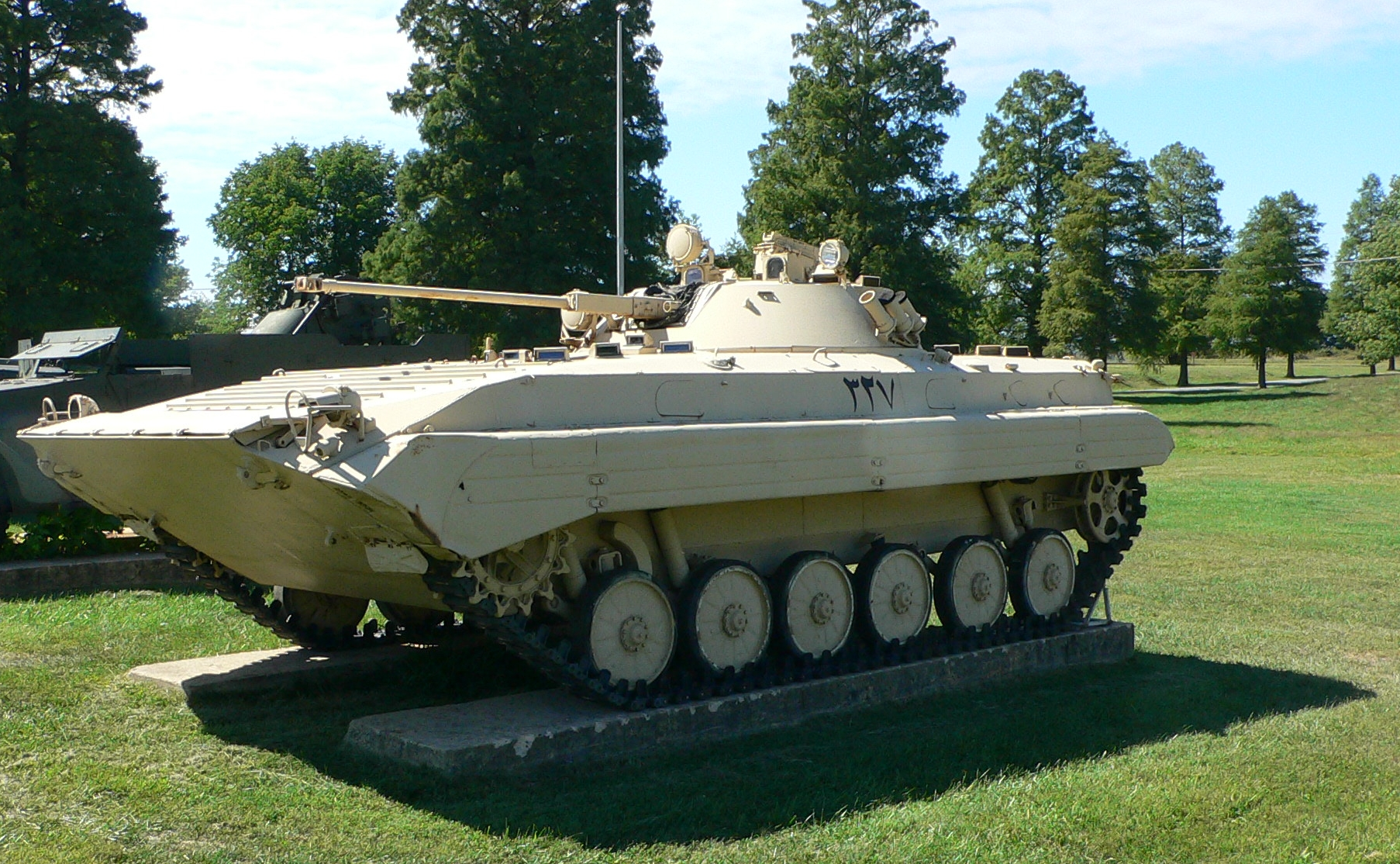
    BMP-2 on display at the United States Army Ordnance Museum (Aberdeen Proving Ground, MD), 19 September 2007.
  - Ob'yekt 675 was an experimental IFV that had enhanced combat characteristics and utilized parts of the BMP-1; it was tested in 1974. The two-man turret was armed with a 30 mm 2A42 autocannon with a two-plane stabilization system and one 7.62 mm PKT coaxial machine gun. A second machine gun was fitted on top of the commander's hatch. The vehicle carried 500 rounds for the main gun and 2000 rounds for the machine guns. It was also armed with a pintle-mounted 9P135M-1 ATGM launcher capable of firing a SACLOS guided 9M113 "Konkurs" (AT-5 Spandrel) and a 9M113M "Konkurs-M" (AT-5B Spandrel B) as well as a 9M111 "Fagot" (AT-4 Spigot) ATGM and a 9M111-2 "Fagot" (AT-4B Spigot B) ATGM. The vehicle could carry either four "Konkurs" ATGMs or six "Fagot" ATGMs. ATGM guidance equipment is located on the top of the turret and is separated from the ATGM launcher. The IFV weighed 13.6 tonnes and had a crew of 3 (+ 7 troopers).
  - Ob'yekt 681 – An experimental IFV also utilizing parts of the BMP-1 IFV – it was developed and built in 1977. It weighed 13.6 tonnes and had a crew of 3 (+ 7 troopers). It was armed with a 73 mm "Zarnitsa" semi-automatic smooth-bore gun with a two-plane stabilization system, a 12.7 mm NVST coaxial heavy machine gun, a 7.62 mm PKT machine gun and a 9P135M ATGM launcher. It carried 40 rounds for the main gun, 500 rounds for the coaxial machine gun and 2400 rounds for the machine gun.
  - BMP-2 (Ob'yekt 675) – An IFV with enhanced fighting qualities based on the BMP-1 and fitted with a new two-man turret armed with a 30 mm 2A42 autocannon.

==== Command and staff ====
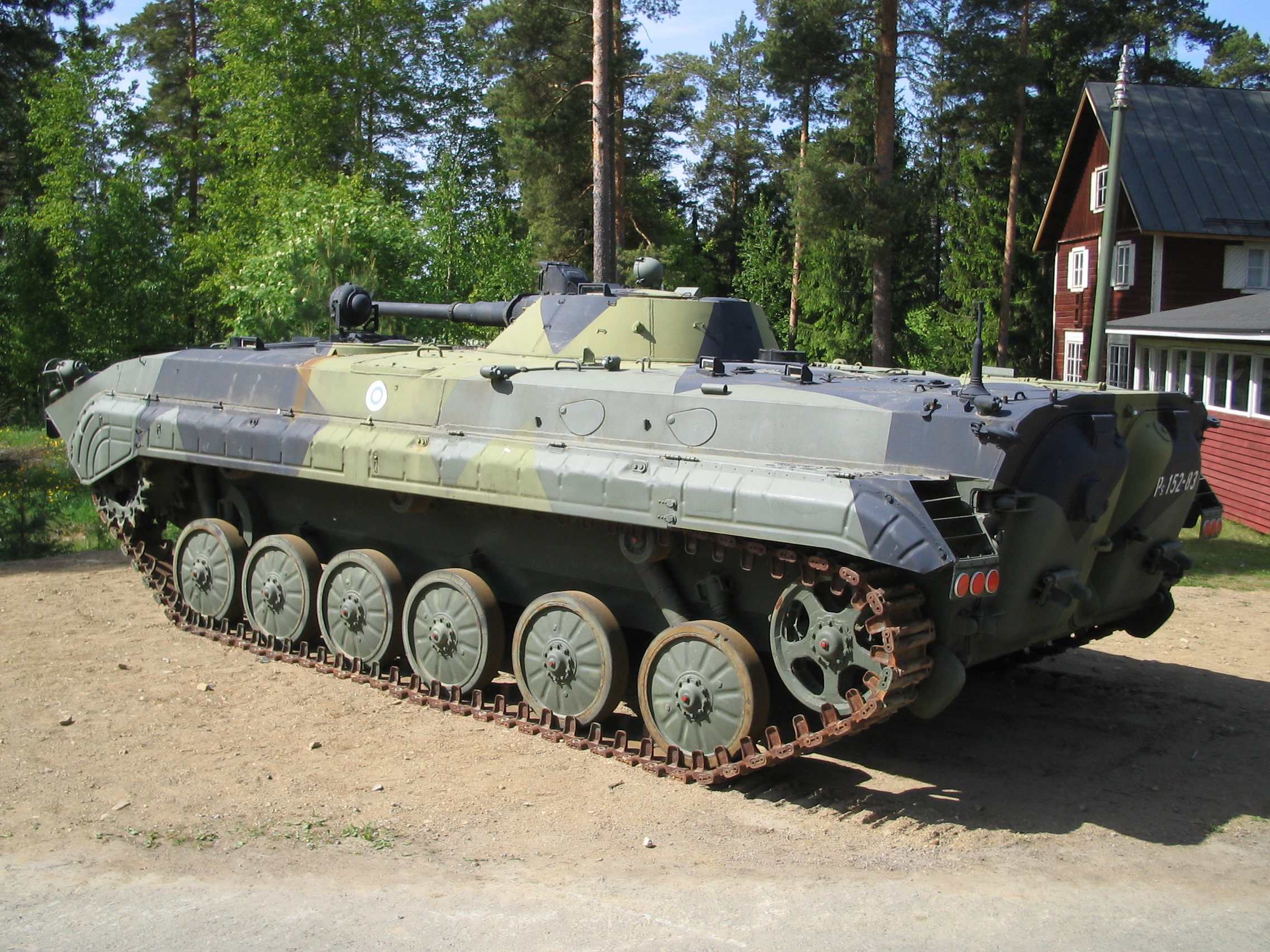
A BMP-1K of the Finnish Army at the Parola tank museum, Finland, 1 June 2008.

- BMP-1K (Ob'yekt 773) (K stands for komandirskaya – command) – Command variant of the BMP-1 for motorized rifle regiments, developed in 1972. One of the most common BMP-1 conversions. Production started in 1973. Standard armament was preserved. The troop compartment was redesigned to accommodate field tables and map boards. There is seating space for three officers. It has an additional antenna, R-123M and R-111 radios and a GPK-69 navigation system. All firing ports except for the one in the left rear door and periscopes were blocked (all machine gun firing ports were welded shut along with all firing ports on the right hand side of the hull). Some are equipped with the GLONASS navigation system. NATO gave it the designation BMP M1974. It has three sub variants:
  - BMP-1K1 – Platoon command variant of BMP-1 with two R-123M radios.
  - BMP-1K2 – Company command variant of BMP-1 with two R-123M radios.
  - BMP-1K3 – Battalion command variant of BMP-1 with one R-123M and one R-130M radio.
- BMP-1 km – Improved command variant of BMP-1.
- BMP-1PK – Command variant of BMP-1P for motorized rifle regiments, equipped with R-126, R-107 and two R-123M radios. It replaced the BMP-1K in serial production. The firing ports and periscopes on the right of the vehicle are blocked. Some IFVs are equipped with the GLONASS navigation system. Vehicles that are based on Ob'yekt 765Sp5 are sometimes called, in Western sources, "BMP-1PKM" or "BMP-1PMK" but those are not official Soviet designations. It has three sub-versions:
  - BMP-1PK1 – Platoon command variant of the BMP-1P.
  - BMP-1PK2 – Company command variant of the BMP-1P.
  - BMP-1PK3 – Battalion command variant of the BMP-1P with telescopic mast mounted on the right side at the rear of the vehicle.

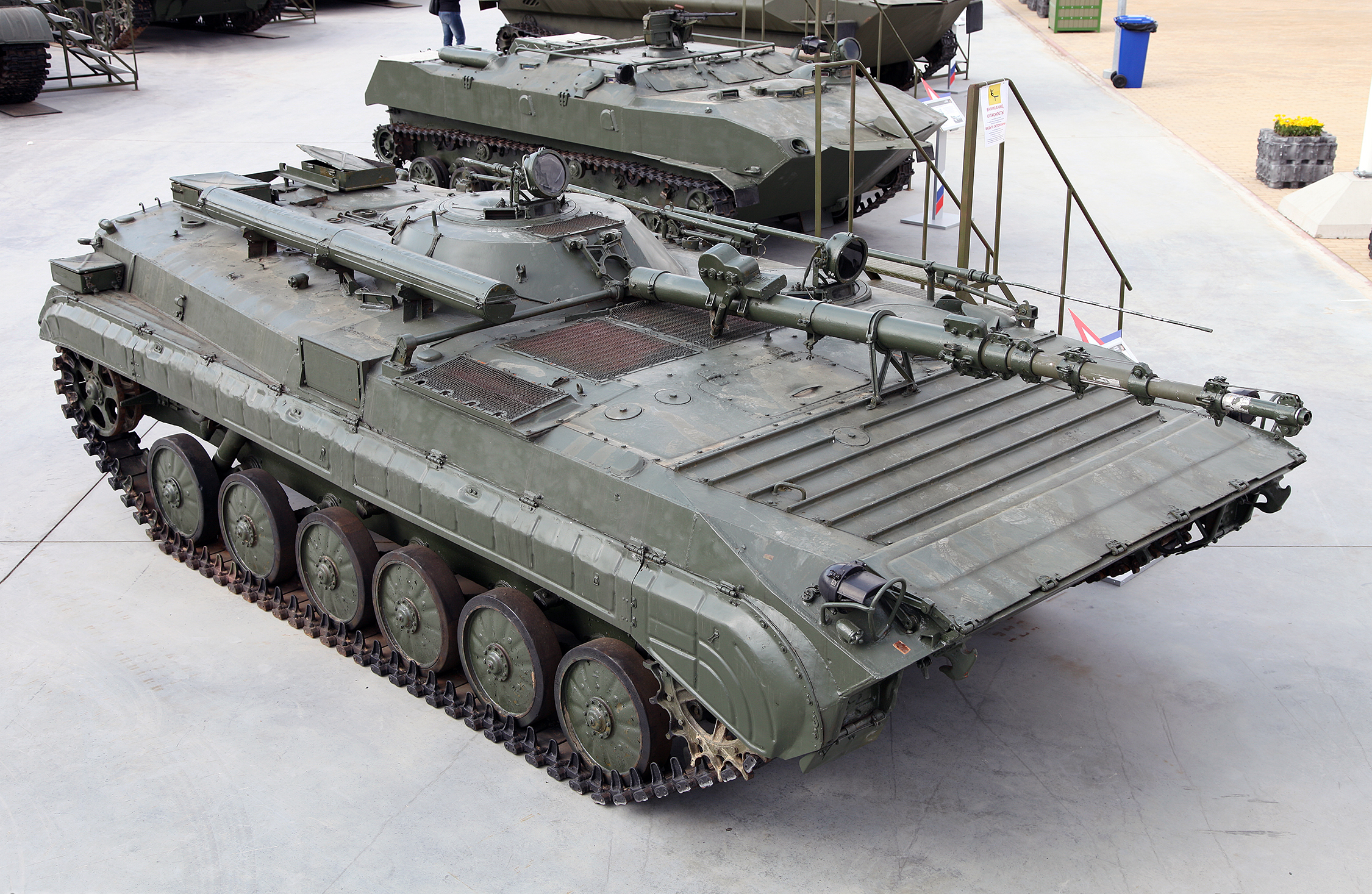
BMP-1KSh

- BMP-1KSh (Ob'yekt 774, 9S743) (KSh stands for komandno-shtabnaya – command and staff) – Command and staff variant of the BMP-1 for motorized rifle and tank regiments with a TNA-3 gyroscopic navigation device, two R-111, one R-123MT and one R-130M additional radios as well as telegraph and telephone equipment. The armament was replaced by the AMU "Hawkeye" 10 m long telescopic mast and the turret was fixed. It also had a tubular case for the AMU "Hawkeye" antenna parts on the right rear of the vehicle, an AB-1P/30 1 kW box-shaped portable petrol-electric generator set at the center of the rear part of the hull's roof instead of two roof hatches (two roof hatches immediately behind the turret remain) and four elevatable whip antennas at the rear (two on the left and two on the right). The vehicle weighs 13 tonnes and has a crew of 3 + 4. It is armed with one 7.62 mm PKT machine gun. It officially entered service with the Soviet Army in 1972, production did not start until 1976. It saw service in Afghanistan and Chechnya. There were three variants of the BMP-1KSh, one being the "Potok"- 2, each had different additional equipment (including R-137 or R-140 or R-45 radios). NATO gave it the designation BMP M1978.
  - BMP-1KShM – Modernization of the BMP-1KSh, new improved navigational and radio equipment was installed. Visual differences between the BMP-1KSh and the BMP-1KShM are insignificant. It was widely used during counter-terrorism operations in Chechnya.
    - MP-31 (BMP-76) – Modification of the BMP-1KShM fitted with a more powerful 5 kW electric generator, additional antennae in the rear part of the hull as well as a gearbox installed on the left hand side, near the generator. It is used for artillery fire control. It is part of the PASUV "Manyevr" automated field air defense command set.

==== Combat reconnaissance ====
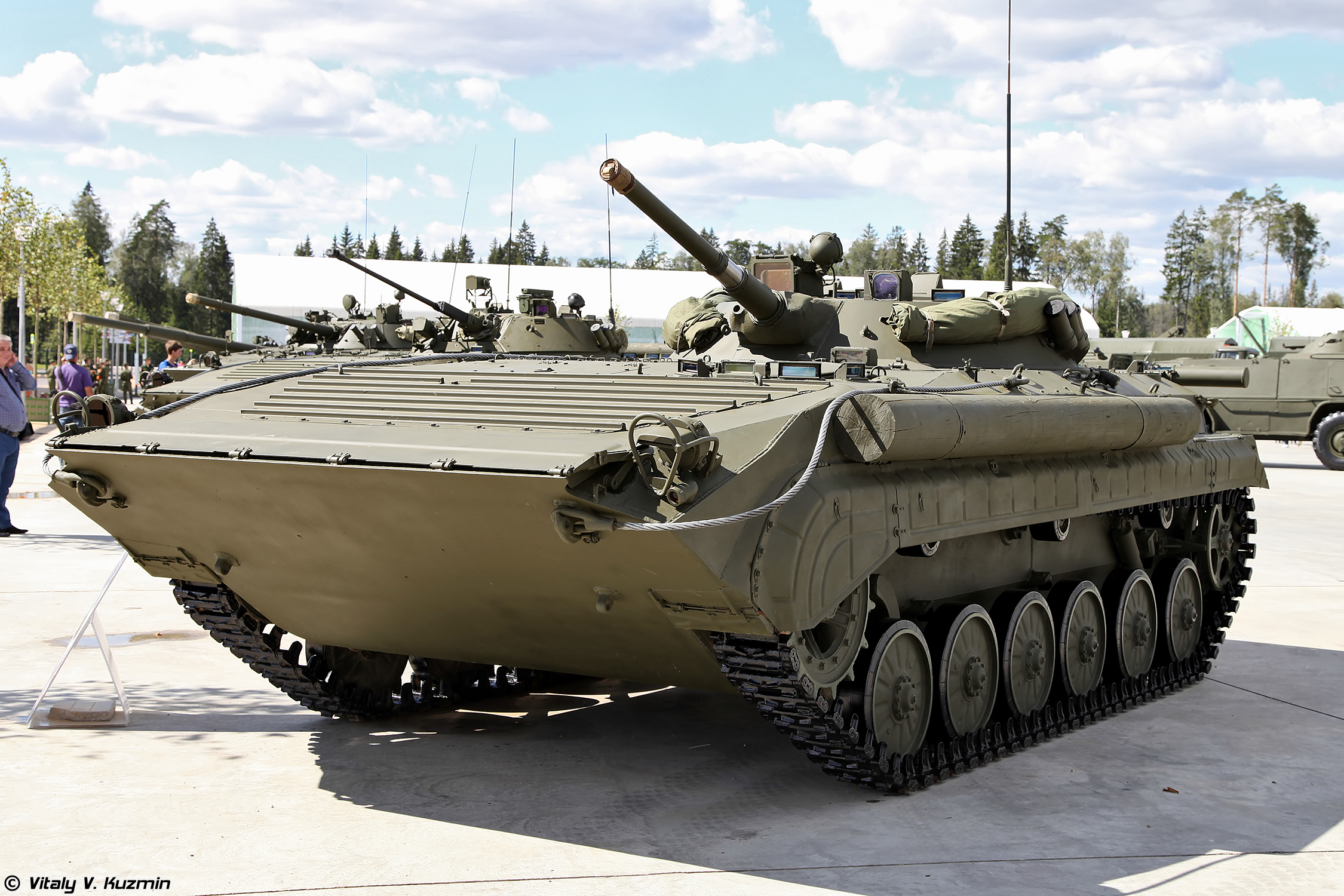
The BRM-1K has an extra-wide turret, mast antenna, and only a single firing port on each side. The turret has a large night sight, and ground surveillance radar which can be extended from a hatch in the turret roof.

- BRM-1 (Ob'yekt 676) – At the end of the 1960s, the Soviet Army started looking for a reconnaissance vehicle suited to the modern battlefield that could be fitted with extensive electronic reconnaissance equipment. Existing reconnaissance vehicles in the Soviet Army, such as the PT-76 amphibious light tank and the BRDM-2 amphibious armored scout car, were only equipped with standard vision devices. The BMP-1 was chosen as the platform for the new reconnaissance vehicle because it had an amphibious capability, good maneuverability, a powerful armament, a spacious hull and an NBC protection system. The development of the BMP-1-based reconnaissance vehicle began in the Chelyabinsk Tractor Works (ChTZ) in the 1960s and 1970s. It was later continued by the Kurgan Engineering Works (KMZ). As a result of that the new BRM-1 officially entered service with the Soviet Army in 1972, production began in 1973 when the first BRM-1s were passed to reconnaissance subunits. It was fitted with an extra-wide, low-profile, two-man turret which was moved to the rear of the hull and without the M3 autoloader and the 9S428 ATGM launcher (although some vehicles did have the ATGM launcher). There were also two small roof hatches, instead of four in the rear part of the hull. A PSNR-5K (1RL-133-1) "Tall Mike" ground surveillance radar which can be extended over the roof of the turret from a rearward-opening hatch in the roof of the turret, (the BRM-1 of the first series did not have ground surveillance radar), a 1D8 laser rangefinder, a TNA-1 or TNA-3 gyroscopic navigation device with coordinates recorder and additional R-123M, R-130M, R-148 and R-014D radios are all fitted. Radio range is up to 50 km with the use of a standard 4 m whip antenna and up to 300 km with the use of the radio mast transported on the rear of the hull. The PSNR-5K "Tall Mike" radar, which is operated by the commander, has two modes – terrain survey and target tracking. It can detect vehicles up to 7000 meters and personnel up to 2000 meters away and can be retracted into the turret when not in use. The doppler radar for range calculations was installed from 1993 onwards. One vehicle was assigned to each recce company of a motorized rifle, tank or artillery unit. The crew was increased from 3 to 6 (commander and gunner who occupy the turret, driver and navigator who occupy the nose section of the hull and two observers who occupy the rear part of the hull). Some vehicles were fitted with a bank of 81 mm 902V "Tucha" smoke grenade launchers. NATO gave it the designations BMP-R and BMP M1976/1.
  - BRM-1 – With its antennae relocated to the rear of the turret.
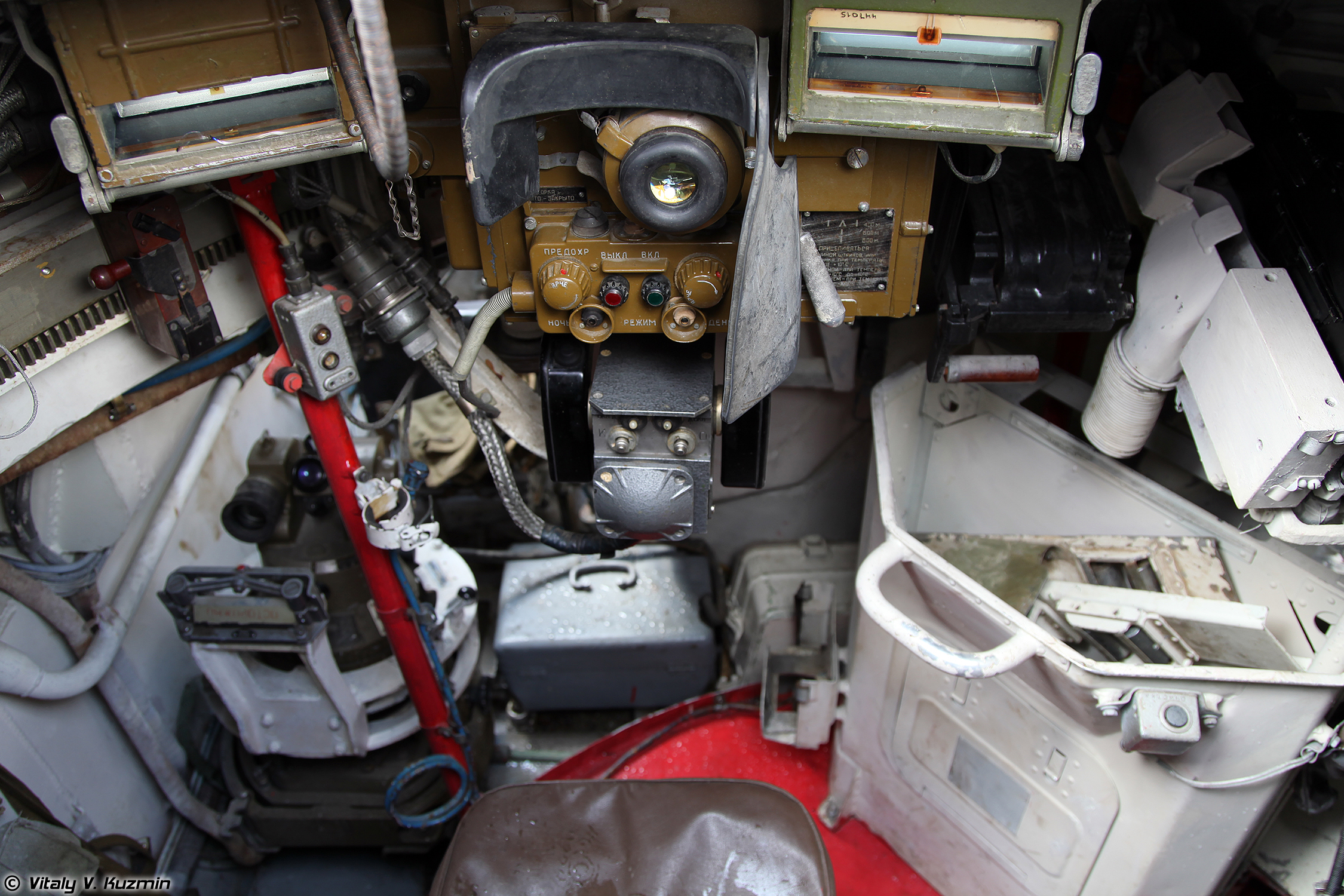
    Vehicle commander's station in the BRM-1K
  - BRM-1K (BRM stands for boevaya razvedyvatel'naya mashina – Combat reconnaissance vehicle, K stands for komandirskaya – command) – An improved command variant of the BRM-1 was developed simultaneously with it. It has all the equipment and fittings of the BRM-1 plus a few new ones. It is fitted with a mast antenna and late production models have six 81 mm 902V "Tucha" smoke grenade launchers (three on each side). It is equipped with 50 mm flares which are used for battlefield illumination. The number of firing ports was reduced from eight to three (one on each side of the vehicle and one in the rear). It is equipped with a DKRM-1 laser rangefinder, an ERRS-1 radio direction finder, a PPChR radiological-chemical detection device, a WPChR military chemical detection device, an IMP-1 mine detector, and an AB-1-P 1 kW box-shaped portable petrol-electric generator. Day/night observation devices consist of thirteen TNPO-170As, one TNPK-240A, two TNPT-1s, two TVNE-1PAs and one pair of 1PN33B night binoculars. Navigation equipment includes a TNA-3 gyroscopic apparatus, a 1G11N gyro-compass and a 1T25 survey device. The BRM-1K entered service with the Soviet Army in 1972, production started in 1973. Ammunition carried was reduced to 20 rounds for the 73 mm 2A28 Grom low pressure smoothbore gun. The vehicle weighs 13.2 tonnes. NATO gave it the designation BMP M1976/2.
    - 2S17-2 Nona-SV – Prototype Soviet 120-mm self-propelled gun based on the BRM-1K.

==== Artillery reconnaissance ====
- PRP-3 "Val" (Ob'yekt 767, 1ZhZ) (PRP stands for podvizhnoy razvedyvatel'niy punkt – mobile reconnaissance post) – Is a BMP-1 converted into an artillery reconnaissance vehicle. It entered service with the Soviet Army in 1970 (production started in 1972 at the Kurgan Engineering Works and in 1979 at the Rubtsovsk Engineering Works). The vehicle was fitted with two R-123M or R-108 radios and optical devices which enabled it to function in the artillery/guided missile target indication, fire adjustment and/or artillery/mortar locating roles. It was armed with one PKT machine gun in a ball mount in front of the new, bigger, two-man turret which was positioned further back than in a normal BMP-1. The turret had two single-piece hatches which opened forward. Both hatches had periscopes for observation and a large optical device in front of each hatch. A shuttered housing held an optical device on the right hand side of the turret. It had a rectangular folding antenna for the 1RL126 "Small Fred" counterbattery/surveillance radar mounted in a circular hatch cover on the left of the rear of the turret which operated in the J-band and had a detection range of 20 km and a tracking range of 7 km. It also had 1V44/1G13M/1G25-1 navigational systems, a 1D6/D6M1 laser rangefinder, a 10P79 vision device, a 1PN29 night vision device and a 90 mm 2P130-1 launcher with 20 9M41 illumination missiles. The crew was increased from 3 to 5 men. One PRP was assigned to an artillery/guided missile battalion (towed or self-propelled) and to the target acquisition battery of an artillery regiment. It was also known as BMP-SON. NATO gave it the designation BMP M1975.
  - PRP-4 "Nard" (Ob'yekt 779, 1V121) The replacement for the PRP-3 "Val", it entered service with the Soviet Army in the 1980s. It was an improved PRP-3 with one 1A30M and two R-173 radios, a 1G25-1/1G13/KP-4 navigational system, a 1D11M-1 active pulsed laser range finder, a 1PN59 thermal vision device and a 1PN61 active pulsed night vision system fitted. A 1RL-133-1 "Tall Mike" retractable battlefield surveillance radar replaced the 1RL-126 "Small Fred" set. The vehicle was fitted with protected mountings on either side of the turret which house optical devices. The PRP-4 was also equipped with new electronic information processing equipment and a self-contained power supply which can be used while the vehicle is stationary. The 2P130-1 missile launcher was removed. The IFV was produced by the Rubtsovsk Engineering Works.

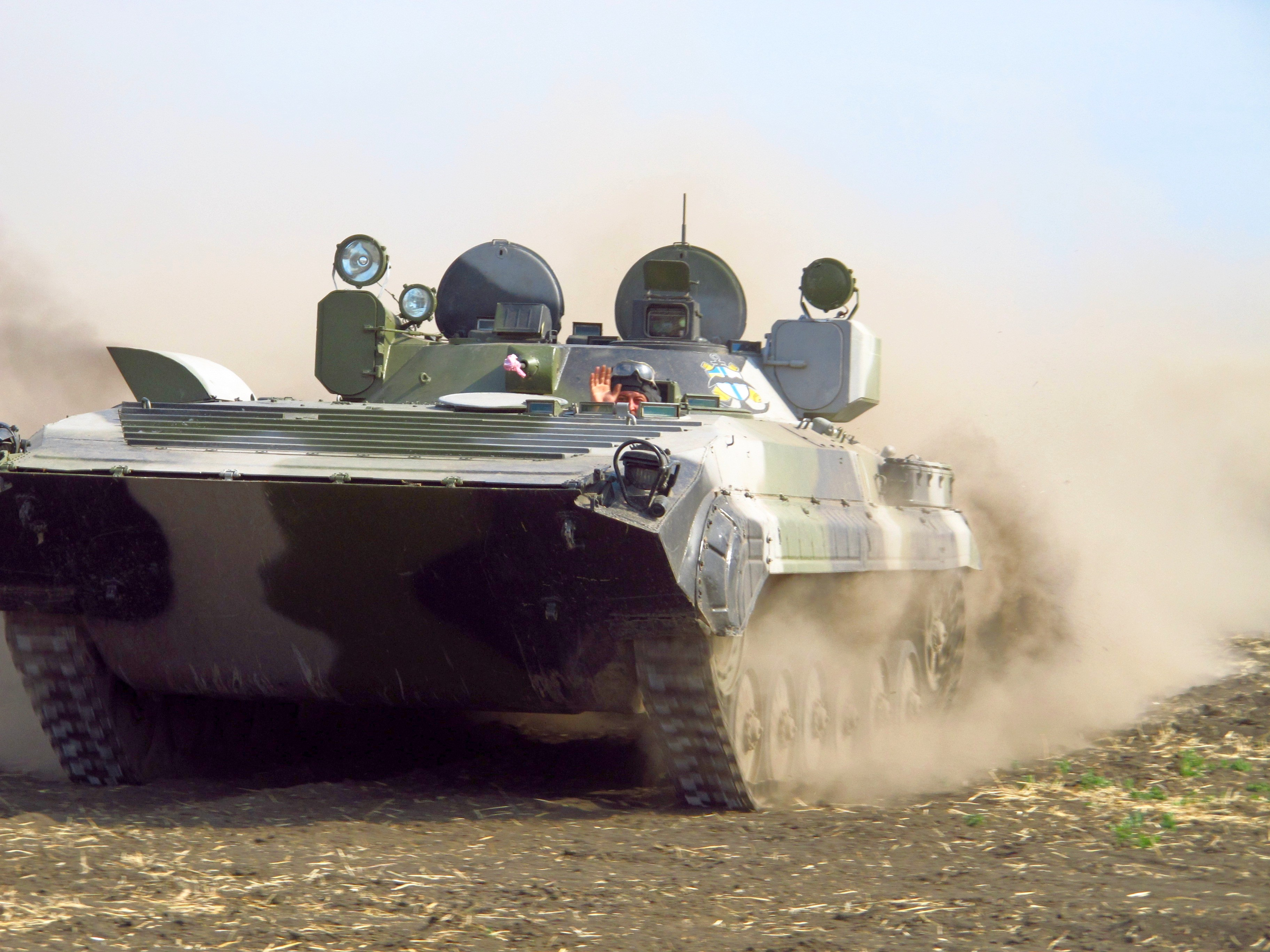
PRP-4M armoured reconnaissance vehicle

    - PRP-4M "Deyteriy" (Ob'yekt 779M, 1V145) – Was a modernized version of the PRP-4 "Nard" developed in 1988. It is equipped with a 1PN71 thermal infrared vision device (which gives the crew a range of up to 3,000 m), a 1D14 periscopic laser rangefinder, a 1D13 portable laser reconnaissance device and a turret antenna mount located on the center of the turret roof behind the radar hatch.
      - PRP-4M "Deyteriy" – Fitted with a fake gun mantlet and offset gun barrel to resemble a BMP-2.
        - PRP-4MU (Ob'yekt 508) – Is the latest serial upgrade with new equipment including a 1RL-133-3 retractable battlefield surveillance radar (with a detection range of up to 12,000 m), a 1D14 periscopic laser rangefinder (its detection range is up to 10,000 m) and T-235-1 U data transmitting equipment. Its left hand side optical housing flap is hinged at the top. The Rubtsovsk Engineering Works started to upgrade all vehicles of the PRP family to the level of the PRP-4MU from the 1980s. The PRP-4MU is used at regimental level. It can detect mobile and stationary targets by day or at night and under every meteorological condition.

==== Ammunition resupply ====
- BMP-1PO (This is not an official Soviet designation)– Has ammunition racks inside the rear doors and the antenna mount moved forward.

==== Training ====
- PPO-1 (PPO stands for podvizhnoy punkt obucheniya – mobile training post) – It is a BMP-1 converted into a driver training vehicle. It was developed by the CTZ design bureau. The turret has been removed and replaced by eight roof-mounted stations for the students under instruction, three down either side and two in the center. Each station is fitted with two TNPO-170 periscopes and a MK-4 sight, all of which are mounted in the forward part of the cupola, and an A-2 unit of the R-124 intercom (used via the two-way radio). The instructor has a console equipped with three cassette recorders, an AGU-10-3 amplifier, three switches, external loudspeakers and a microphone. During training each platoon is equipped with two standard BMP-1s and one PPO-1. The instructor and one of the trainees take turns to send information while rest of the trainees listen via the loudspeakers. It is also known under the designation BMP-PPO.

==== Armoured recovery ====
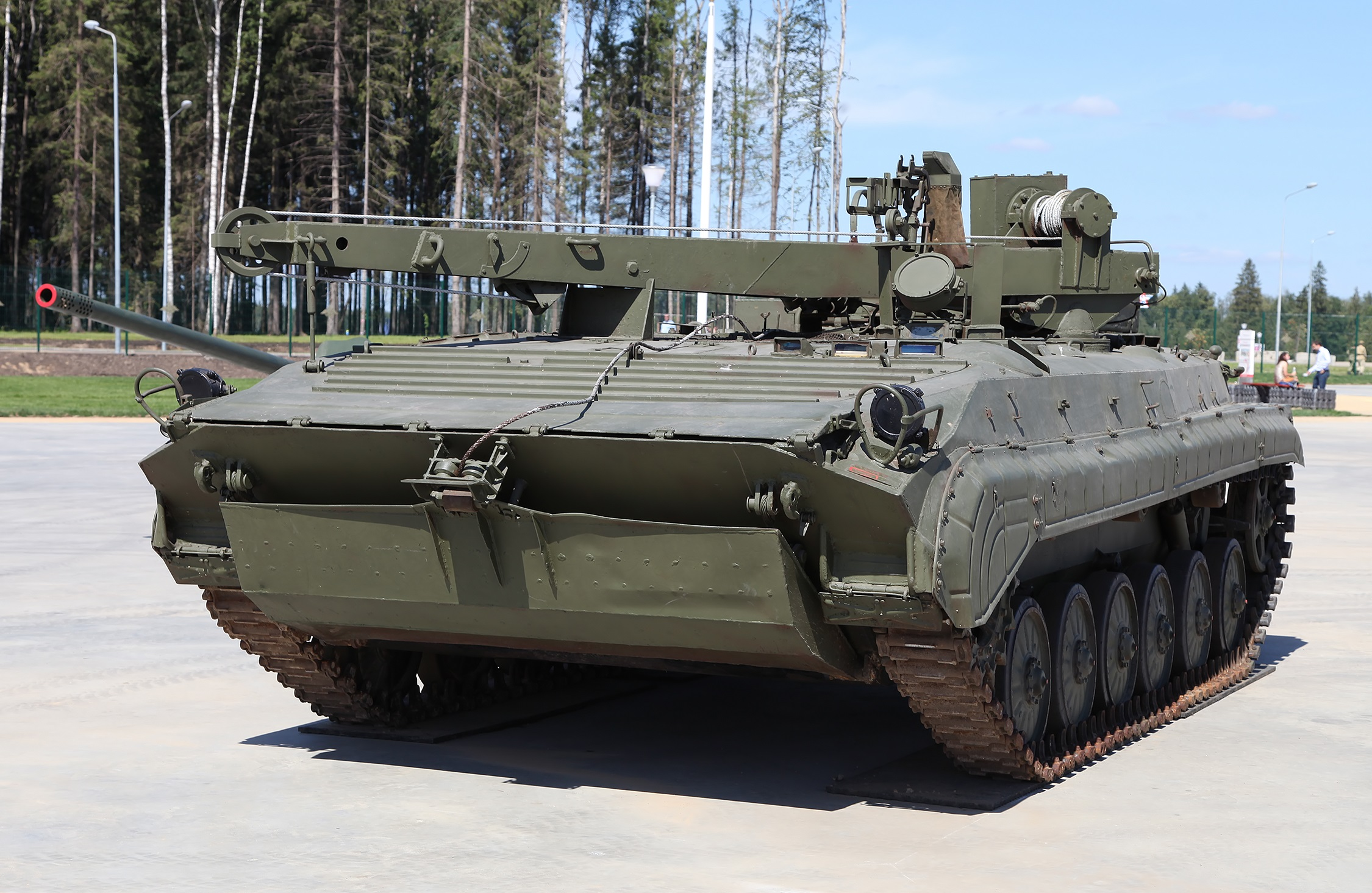
A BREM-2 at armoured recovery vehicle at Patriot Park, Russia

- BREM-2 (BREM stands for bronirovannaya remonto-evakuatsionnaya mashina – armored maintenance-recovery vehicle) – The turret has been removed and replaced by an armored plate. The vehicle is fitted with a load platform with a capacity of 1.5 tonnes, a crane with a 1.5-tonne capacity (7 tonnes with additional outfit), which is placed on top of the hull and a pull winch with a 6.5-tonne capacity (19.5 tonnes with block pulley), which is placed inside. It also carries additional repair and recovery equipment on the top and sides of the hull. This equipment includes a tow bar, 200 meters of rope, heavy tools, electric welding equipment and excavating tools. There is a dozer blade at the front of the hull which is used to brace the BREM-2 while it is using its crane. The vehicle was developed in 1982. Its primary role of is the repair and recovery of IFVs from the BMP family of vehicles under field conditions. It is armed with a PKT machine gun for which it carries 1,000 rounds and has six 81 mm 902V "Tucha" smoke grenade launchers (in addition to the standard TDA thermal smoke generator). It weighs 13.6 tonnes and has a crew of three. Late BREM-2 ARVs have flotation sides-skirts/mudguards from the BMP-2. Some BMP-1s have been converted into BREM-2 ARVs by tank repair workshops of the Ministry of Defense from 1986 onwards.
- BREM-Ch is the Soviet designation for the Czechoslovak-built VPV ARV, the design of which was inspired by the BREM-2. The unofficial designation BREM-4 is used in Soviet Army units which received Czechoslovak-made VPVs.

==== Combat engineer ====
- IRM "Zhuk" (IRM stands for inzhenernaya razvedyvatel'naya mashina – engineer reconnaissance vehicle, "Zhuk" means Beetle) – All-terrain combat engineer vehicle for land and river reconnaissance, developed in the 1970s. Production started in 1980 with the use of components from both the BMP-1 and BMP-2. Fifty IRMs were produced from 1986. However, the suspension had a new hull, one extra road wheel and one additional hydraulic shock-absorber. It has four pressurized compartments, with the engine located at the rear. There are three hatches on the top of the hull and one emergency hatch in the bottom. The IRM is equipped with two retractable propellers in ring covers for swimming and steering and two cases with 16 9M39 solid engines (each has a thrust of 312 kg and weighs 6.3 kg), for getting out of mud. Special reconnaissance equipment consists of two R-147 radios; one PIR-451 periscope; TNPO-160, TNP-370 and TNV-25M periscopic observation devices; an AGI-1s horizon indicator; a DSP-30 portable periscopic rangefinder, a PAB-2M portable aiming circle, one TNA-3 gyroscopic navigational device, an EIR echo depth finder with automatic recorder and three sonar transducers, a RShM-2 river-type wide-span mine detector, RVM-2M and IMP-2 portable mine detectors, a PR-1 portable penetrometer used to analyze soil for crossability and an ice drill with ice stake. The vehicle has two arms for detecting metallic mines which are mounted on the front of the hull. They can be retracted when not in use. The mine detector arms can be hydraulically articulated to their operating position in under three minutes. The mine detector brings the vehicle to a full stop upon encountering an obstacle or detecting a metallic object. The PIR-451 periscope is mounted on the right hand side of the front of the vehicle, at the commander's station. It can be extended to 1.5 m and can move vertically up to 750 mm. The IRM also has an air revitalization system, automatic fire extinguishers, a water pump with a capacity of 1,000 L/min, an automatic NBC protection system and an engine thermal smoke generator. It weighs 17.2 tonnes and has a crew of six. It is 8.22 m long, 3.15 m wide and 2.40 m high. Ground clearance is 420 mm. It has a maximum road speed of 52 km/h and it can swim at up to 12 km/h. It is armed with a PKT machine gun fitted in a small turret for which it carries 1,000 rounds. In the west, the IRM was believed to be based on the 2S1 Gvozdika self-propelled howitzer until 1986 when its true origins became known.
  - IPR (IPR stands for inzhenerny podvodny razvedchik – engineer underwater scout) is a variant of the IRM "Zhuk" used for the reconnaissance of water barriers. It is equipped with a snorkel, a ballast tank in the nose section, two large and two small ballast tanks, and an air-locked tank for diving equipment which make it possible to perform underwater reconnaissance at a maximum operational depth of 8 m and at an all-up depth of 15 m. It was produced in small numbers by the "Muromteplovoz" Locomotive Works.

=== Russia ===
==== BMP-1 variants and modernization ====
- BMP-1 "Razbezhka" – A BMP-1 with a turret from the BMD-2. It was to be armed with a 30 mm autocannon. It was developed by the Chelyabinsk Tractor Plant at the end of the 1990s. It never left the design stage.
- BMP-1-30 – Modernization of the BMP-1, a prototype was built and tested in 1997. It came with a standard BMP-1 chassis equipped with the BMD-2 turret with 30 mm 2A42 autocannon and UTD-230 diesel engine developing 360 hp (268 kW) (its maximum road speed was increased to 70 km/h). It carries 300 rounds for the main gun. The BMP-1-30 weighs 13.8 tonnes and has a crew of 3 (+ 8 troopers).
- BMP-1 – Experimentally fitted with the Israeli-developed OWS-25R one-man Overhead Weapon Station, it was armed with a 25 mm Oerlikon KBA autocannon, an ATGM launcher for two ATGMs, a 7.62 mm coaxial machine gun and equipped with six smoke grenade launchers.
- BMP-1M – A modernization of the BMP-1, it weighs about 13 tonnes. It was developed at the end of the 1990s by the Tula Instrument Engineering Design Bureau (KBP) in order to increase the vehicle's combat efficiency 5–7 times. It is fitted with a TKB-799 "Kliver" one-man weapons station armed with a missile pod, a 30 mm 2A72 multipurpose autocannon (it can be used against both ground and air targets) and a 7.62 mm PKTM coaxial machine gun. The missile pod is mounted on the right side of the weapons station and normally holds four 9M133 Kornet (AT-14 Spriggan) or 9M133F "Kornet" ATGMs with a laser jam-resistant fire control system, but these can be removed and replaced by a pod of 9K38 Igla (SA-18 Grouse) surface-to-air missiles. It carries 300 rounds for the main gun, 2000 rounds for the machine gun and 4 ATGMs. It also has a modern computerized fire control system with a two-plane stabilizer and a 1K13-2 telescopic sight with distance measurement/thermal/laser channels and ballistic calculator with external sensors. Computer simulations proved that the BMP-1M can outperform the American M2/M3 Bradley at firepower efficiency (the tested aspects included ATGM power, the effective range of the ATGM and the autocannon during day and night conditions and launching the ATGM while on the move). In these simulations the BMP-1M won a combat engagement with the M2 Bradley 1.3 times more often. The first BMP-1M was tested at the AFV Research Institute in Kubinka in 1998. Two BMP-1Ms were shown publicly for the first time at the IDEX'99 International Exhibition in Abu Dhabi. The BMP-1M modernization is also offered on the export market.
- BMP-1 – Fitted with "Bakhcha-U" weapons station developed by the Tula Instrument Engineering Design Bureau (KBP). It was designed in the 2000s. The "Bakhcha-U" weapons station is armed with a 100 mm 2A70 gun/missile launcher (the same as the one fitted on the BMP-3), a 30 mm 2A72 autocannon and a 7.62 mm PKTM coaxial machine gun.
- BMP-1AM Basurmanin – Upgraded version of BMP-1 developed by The Uralvagonzavod (UVZ) research-and-manufacturing corporation (a subsidiary of the Rostec state corporation). BMP-1AM is BMP-1 with the original turret replaced by the turret from BTR-82A with 2A72 30 mm autocannon, a Kalashnikov PKTM 7.62 mm medium machinegun, and smoke grenade launchers 902V Tucha. The turret will be fitted with the TKN-4GA combined day-night sighting system. The 2A72 cannon will be able to use air burst munitions. Approved in 2018, it is the most recent Russian BMP-1 upgrade. The Russian army plans to upgrade all of their BMP-1s and BMP-1Ps to BMP-1AM level.

==== Auxiliary (refuelers, repair) ====
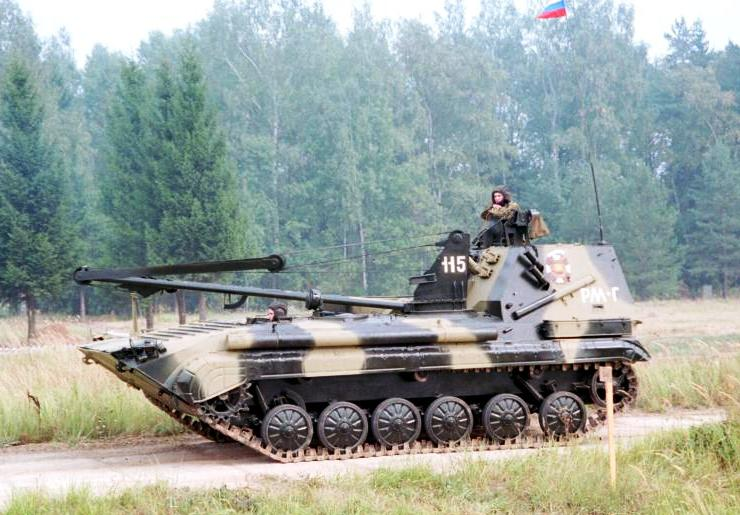
RM-G repair vehicle in 2002

- BTZ-3 (BTZ stands for bronirovanny toplivozapravshchik – armored refueler) – Is a BMP-1 converted into an armored refueler developed during the First Chechen War. Two prototypes were built. The BTZ is equipped with a 3,000-l fuel tank and a 100-l engine oil tank, fuel-oil pumps, a fuel-dispensing unit and a fire-extinguishing system. One prototype was used successfully in Chechnya. Preparations were made to start production.
- RM-G (Ob'yekt 507) (RM-G stands for remontnaya mashina – gusenichnaya – repair vehicle, tracked) – It is a BMP-1 converted into a repair vehicle produced by the Rubtsovsk Engineering Works from 1995. It is used for technical reconnaissance as well as for routine repairs and the recovery of tanks and IFVs. The RM-G is fitted with a 1 tonne load platform, a superstructure at the rear of the hull and a 3 tonne KU-3 crane at the front of the hull. The superstructure has a small IR searchlight and six 81 mm 902V "Tucha" smoke grenade launchers (three on each side). It is armed with one 7.62 mm PKT machine gun. The RM-G is also equipped with different tools, electric welding and diagnostic equipment and a RM-G electricity supply system for starting the engines of tanks and IFVs.

==== Combat reconnaissance ====
- BRM-1 km – Modernized Russian combat reconnaissance vehicle with 30mm main turret based on the BRM-1K. At least four are in service with Southern Military District in 2023.

==== Artillery reconnaissance ====
- PRP-4A Argus This is an optical-electronic reconnaissance vehicle. It is the most recent variant of the PRP-4 family to be in service and production with upgraded equipment. It is being supplied to the Russian Ground Forces since 2009 and it is also available for export.

==== Civilian tracked vehicles converted from the BMP-1 ====
- ATM "Berezina" (ATM stands for avariyno-transportnaya mashina) is a decommissioned BMP-1 converted into a civilian multi-purpose emergency transport vehicle with built-up heated and glazed crew and passenger compartment sections. It is equipped with a load platform with a capacity of 500 kg. The "Berezina" was designed in the early 1990s for delivering goods and passengers to hard-to-reach places, welding in the field and towing road vehicles.
  - ATM "Berezina-2" – Improved version of the ATM "Berezina" with additional repair tools and new electric welding equipment powered by a VG-7500 generator. The fuel tanks were relocated to the outside of the vehicle to save space, (for 15 passengers). The vehicle is no longer amphibious. It is produced by the 140th Tank Repair Workshop. The full weight of the "Berezina-2" is 13 tonnes.
- LPM-1 (LPM stands for leso-pozharnaya mashina – forest fire fighting vehicle) is a result of cooperation between the Russian Research Institute of Transport Engineering from Saint Petersburg and the 140th Tank Repair Workshop. A small production run between 1992 and 2001, produced 25 vehicles. The LPM-1 is equipped with a 2000-liter water-tank, a NShN-600N fire pump with a 600 L/min capacity, a plow and one or two remote fire hoses. It is sometimes incorrectly called the PPM-1.
  - LPM-2 – A more extensive conversion of a BMP-1 into a civil fire-fighting vehicle to be used against strong forest and peat fires. Development started in 1995. The LPM-2 has a new larger superstructure with a 5000-litre water-tank and is equipped with a NShN-600N fire pump, one main firehose from the ATs-40(131)137 fire fighting vehicle and two remote firehoses, a PKL-70 mounted ditching plow and a R-123M VHF radio. The suspension on the BMP-1 was changed significantly, ground clearance was increased to 480 mm and the vehicle weighs 18.5 tonnes (with water). It has a crew of two (plus four firefighters). The LPM-2 won a gold medal in an exhibition of fire-fighting equipment in Brussels. Cyprus has planned to order some of these vehicles while Turkey has already purchased a quantity (Turkish specialists installed two Czech IFEX firehoses and new doors). It is produced by the 140th Tank Repair Workshop.
- Zaisan-2 is a BMP-1 that has been converted into a civil emergency vehicle used to transport a 12-man emergency response team and survival equipment to hard-to-reach places. It can be used for rescue operations during technogenic accidents and natural disasters. Developed by the Tank Repair Workshop in Ust'-Kamenogorsk. It weighs 10 tonnes.
- Taiga is a BMP-1 converted into a civil logging tractor. It is equipped with a motor-powered 9-tonne winch and a logging hydraulic bulldozer blade. It was developed by the Tank Repair Workshop in Ust'-Kamenogorsk. It weighs 8 tonnes.

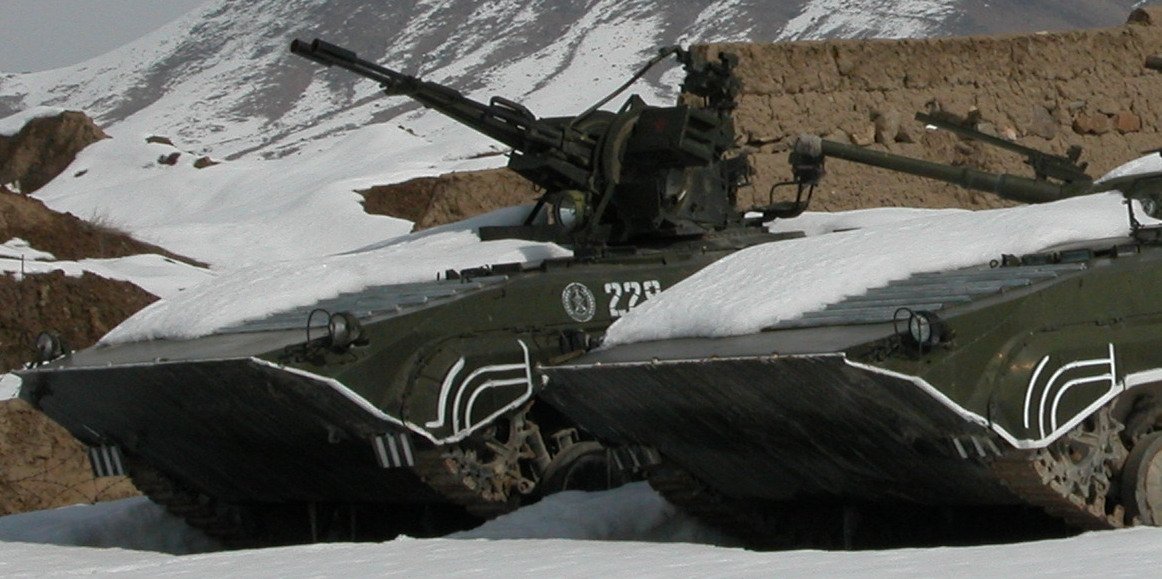
An Afghan BMP-1-based SPAAG armed with ZU-23-2 anti-aircraft gun.

=== Afghanistan ===
- BMP-1 – Had its turret replaced by the ZU-23-2 anti-aircraft gun. It was used for fire support in the Afghanistan mountains. These vehicles were operated by the Afghan National Army.

=== Armenia ===
- BMP-1-ZU – Several BMP-1s were modified with low elevation ZU-23-2 machine guns over the barrel replacing the missile launcher. The guns are controlled by the gunner from inside the turret, and are fed by belts that stretch around the turret. At least four conversions of this type were made, with one being captured by Azerbaijan during the Second Nagorno-Karabakh War.

=== Belarus ===
- BMP-1 – Is an IFV upgraded by the 140th Repair Workshop to BMP-1P status. Vehicles modernized in the 2000s are equipped with a modern gun aiming mechanism, more up-to-date sights and a semi-automatic infrared jam-resistant fire control system.
- BMP-1 – Equipped with the 2A42 Cobra overhead mount gun turret, modular, one-man turret. It is a co-operative project between Slovakia and Belarus.
  - BMP-1 – Fitted with 2A42 Cobra as above, also flotation sides-skirts/mudguards from the BMP-2.
  - BMP-1 – Equipped with 2A48 Cobra as above, but with additional armor and explosive reactive armor (ERA), on the sides of the hull.

=== Bulgaria ===
- BMP-1KShM-9S743 – Bulgarian version of the MP-31 with minor changes.
- BMP-2+ – BMP-1 upgraded to BMP-2 level. It is equipped with the BM1 manned turret armed with 30mm 2A42 autocannon, UDAR-M ATGM, 7.62mm PKT machine gun, and three Tucha 902 smoke grenade launchers. BM1 is a modified version of Ukrainian KBA-105 Shkval turret. It also has new radios and a GPS satellite navigation system, and can be optionally fitted with appliqué armor, an infrared sight, AGS-17, 30mm automatic grenade launcher and a STANAG-compatible 30mm autocannon.

=== China ===
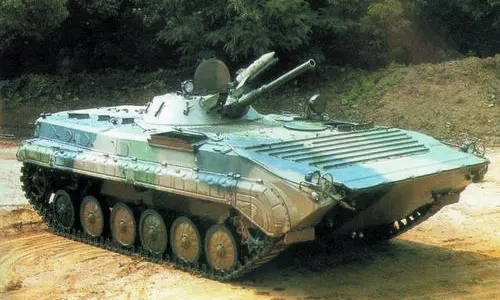
A PLA Type 86 (WZ-501)

- Type 86 – A Chinese copy of the BMP-1 (Ob'yekt 765Sp3). It is armed with an ATGM launcher for the HJ-73 "Red Arrow 73" ATGM which is a copy of the Soviet 9M14 "Malyutka". It is powered by the Type 6V150 diesel engine which is a copy of the Soviet UTD-20. Equipment includes the A-220A radio (a copy of the Soviet R-123M), A-221A intercom (a copy of the Soviet R-124), two 7.62 mm machine guns, a 40 mm rocket propelled grenade (RPG) launcher and a HN-5 or QW-1 MANPADS. Its industrial designation is WZ-501.
  - WZ-501 – Converted into an NBC reconnaissance vehicle with a raised troop compartment.
  - WZ-501 – Converted into a battlefield surveillance vehicle.
  - YW-501 – Export variant of WZ-501.
  - NFV-1 (N stands for NORINCO, F stands for FMC and V-1 stands for Vehicle 1) – An export variant which was the product of a co-operative project between the Chinese NORINCO and US FMC companies in the 1980s. Its goal was to fit a FMC large vertical slab-sided turret with a chamfered front called "Sharpshooter", onto a modified Type 86 hull. It was to be armed with a 25 mm M242 Bushmaster autocannon with a two plane stabilization system and a 7.62 mm M240 coaxial machine gun (on the left hand side of the main gun). The vehicle carries 344 rounds for the main gun, 200 rounds are for 'ready use' while 144 are kept in storage. 2,300 rounds are carried for the machine gun. The gun is moved in the horizontal and vertical planes by an electromechanical system, it can also be moved manually. The gun can be depressed or elevated between −7° and +44°. The gunner has the М36Е3 dual mode day/night sight and 4 periscope vision blocks which are located in the front and on the sides of the turret. Also an additional periscope vision block can be fitted to the back of the turret. The tracks have been slightly modified. As the result of all these changes the weight of the vehicle increased to 13.6 tonnes and the maximum range was reduced to 460 km. The vehicle is also wider (2.97 m) and higher (2.25 m). The prototype was shown to the public for the first time in November 1986. It never left the prototype stage because the US government prohibited any further collaboration with China.
  - Type 86-I – Improved variant of the Type 86 designed by the Chinese together with the US FMC company at the end of the 1980s. It is fitted with a one-man overhead mount turret armed with a licensed copy of the 25 mm M242 Bushmaster autocannon and a coaxial 7.62 mm Type 59 machine gun. The overhead mount turret is the same as the one on the ZSL92 wheeled IFV. The vehicle carries 400 rounds for the main gun and 2000 rounds for the machine gun. It is powered by a new 6V150F 29.41-litre diesel engine which is a powered-up version of the 6V150. It develops 400 hp (298 kW). Maximum road speed has increased to 70 km/h. The tracks have been slightly modified. The weight of the vehicle has increased to 13.6 tonnes. 350 were produced. Its industrial designation is WZ-501A. It is also called Type 86-1.
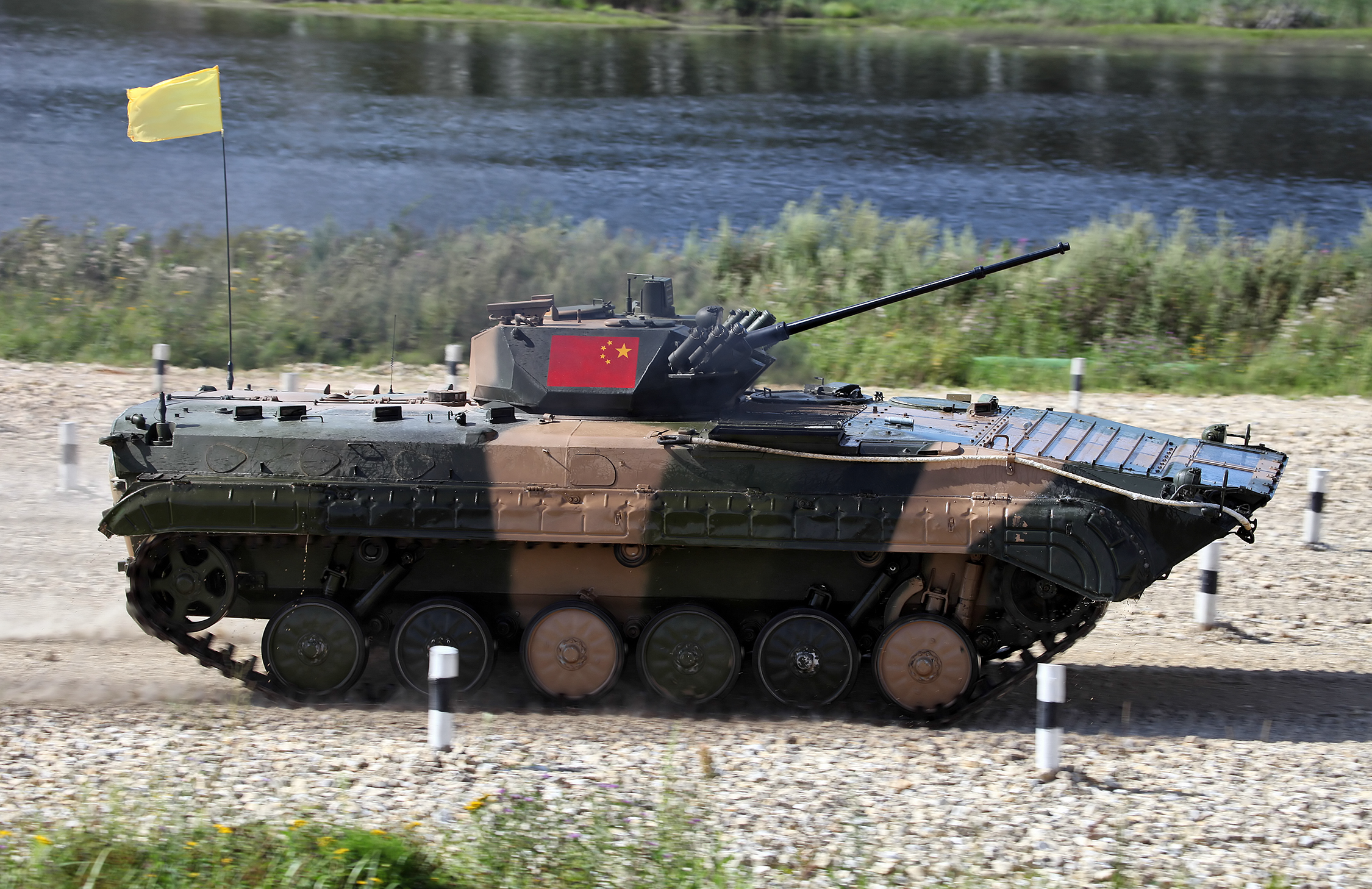
    A Type 86A infantry fighting vehicle
  - Type 86A – Modernization fitted with a new turret armed with a 30 mm autocanon although the ATGM launcher for the HJ-73 ATGMs was retained and is positioned on the right hand side of the roof of the turret. The turret was equipped with two clusters of three smoke grenade launchers (one on each side of the turret). It is sometimes called the Type 86Gai, G stands for Gai – improved, overall, it is broadly equivalent to a BMP-2.
  - Type 86B – Variant developed by NORINCO for Chinese naval infantry. It features a slightly higher hull, an amphibious kit, an exhaust extension, a bow extension, a larger trim vane, a mount for an outboard motor on the rear of the hull to improve its swimming performance, a raised engine air intake on the right hand side of the front of the hull, detachable pontoons in the front and rear of the hull, a high snorkel and large side screens for better streamlining. Also the turret was improved by adding two clusters of three smoke grenade launchers (one on each side of the turret). Its industrial designation is WZ-501C.
  - WZ-502 – WZ-501 equipped with a mortar.
  - WZ-503 – WZ-501 converted into an APC. It lacks the turret and has a taller troop compartment. The number of passengers was increased from 8 to 13. The vehicle's armament consists of one centrally mounted 12.7 mm heavy machine gun operated by the commander/gunner. It did not leave the prototype stage.
    - WZ-506 – WZ-503 converted into an armored command post for the divisional or regimental commanders of armored formations. The personnel compartment can accommodate six staff members, four radios and an auxiliary electricity generator. It can be recognized by its four whip antennas.
  - WZ-504 (Type 504) – The troop compartment was replaced by a weapons compartment which incorporates an elevatable weapon station armed with four HJ-73 "Red Arrow 73" cable-guided ATGM rail launchers mounted under the roof of the weapons station and equipped with optical sights. The launcher can be retracted into the compartment when not in use. The vehicle carries 16 ATGMs. It never left the prototype stage.
  - WZ-505 – WZ-501 converted into an armored ambulance with raised troop compartment and armed with one machine gun.

=== Cuba ===
- BMP-1 converted into a self-propelled howitzer armed with a 122 mm D-30 howitzer in an open-topped superstructure placed at the rear of the hull.
- BMP-1 converted into a self-propelled howitzer armed with a D-30 howitzer in an open-topped turret placed on the rear of the hull.

=== Former Czechoslovakia ===
BMP models of Czechoslovakia.

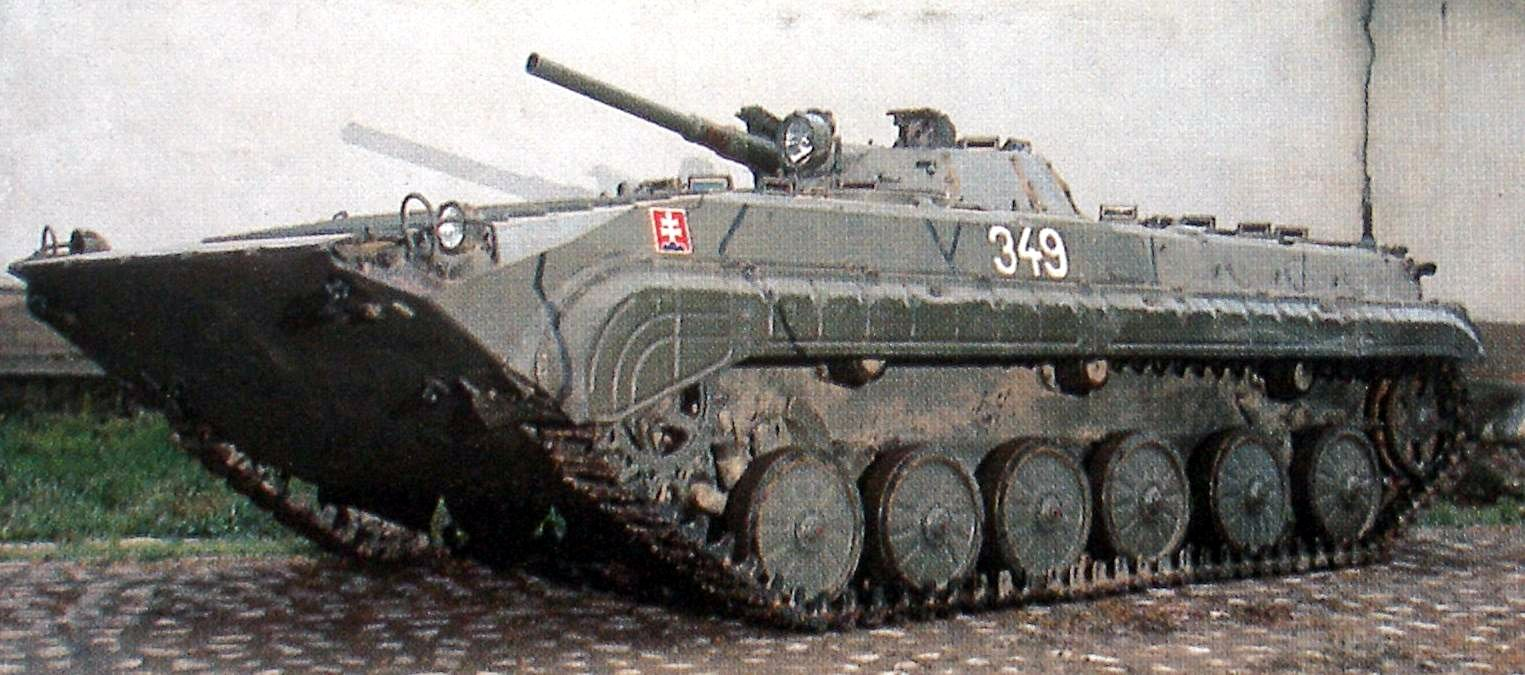
A BVP-1 of the Slovak Army

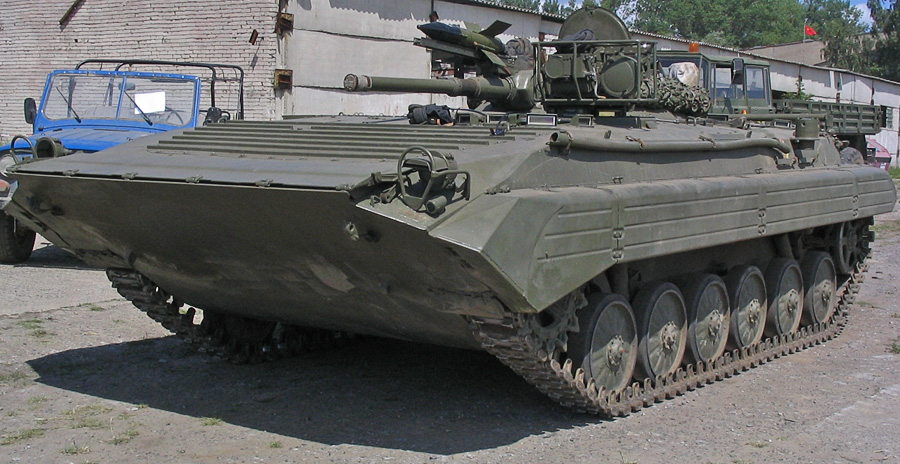
A BPzV "Svatava" combat reconnaissance vehicle.

- BVP-1 (BVP-1 stands for bojové vozidlo pěchoty – 1 – "Infantry Fighting Vehicle – 1") – Czechoslovak designation for the BMP-1.
  - BVP-1 with six MD smoke grenade launchers at the rear of the turret and flotation sides-skirts/mudguards from the BVP-2.
  - BVP-1K – Command version of BVP-1.
  - BPzV "Svatava" (BPzV stands for bojové průzkumné vozidlo – "Reconnaissance Fighting Vehicle") – Reconnaissance vehicle based on the basic BVP-1. It was intended for independent reconnaissance or combat behind enemy lines. It was fitted with a passive observation system on the commander's station, improved armament, protection and mobility, a PSNR-5K "Tall Mike" external tripod radar, an NNP-21 observation system and an additional 902S eight barreled smoke grenade launcher on the rear of the turret. The crew was increased from 3 to 5.
  - BVP-1 "Strop" – A BVP-1 with the turret replaced by twin 30 mm PLDvK vz.53/59 anti-aircraft guns. Developed in the mid-1980s. It has a new commander's hatch located to the front right of a two-man turret. The turret is further to the rear than on a BVP-1 and has no hatches, so the crew enters through the rear doors. In the front and below the gun mount is the housing for the various sights associated with controlling the weapons. The Czechoslovak Army evaluated the vehicle but did not accept it for service. Several examples were seen in use by Angolan and Cuban forces during the Angolan Civil War.
  - Vz.85 ShM-120 PRAM-S (samohybný minomet) – 120 mm automatically loaded Model 1982 self-propelled mortar with a range from 504m to 8036m mounted on the BVP-1 chassis in a low casemate superstructure in the rear half of the vehicle. Its role is to bring sustained fire support to mechanized units. The mortar has a rate of fire of 18 – 20 rounds per minute and is capable of firing 40 rounds in 5 minutes or 70 rounds in 10 minutes. Total ammunition load is 80 HE, SMK and ILL rounds including 21 in the automatic loader. Apart from the mortar the vehicle is equipped with a 9M113 Konkurs (AT-5 Spandrel) ATGM, a 12.7 mm NSVT heavy machine gun, RPG-75 anti-tank grenade launchers, F1 hand grenades and Model 58 7.62 mm submachineguns.
  - BVP-1 AMB-S (ambulantní vozidlo) – Armored ambulance without the turret and with a built-up troop compartment and room for 4 stretchers. There is a small IR searchlight on top of the troop compartment. The BVP-1 AMB-S designation is still used by the Czech Army, the BVP-1 AMB-S as used by the Slovak army has a different designation (See "Slovakia" section for details).

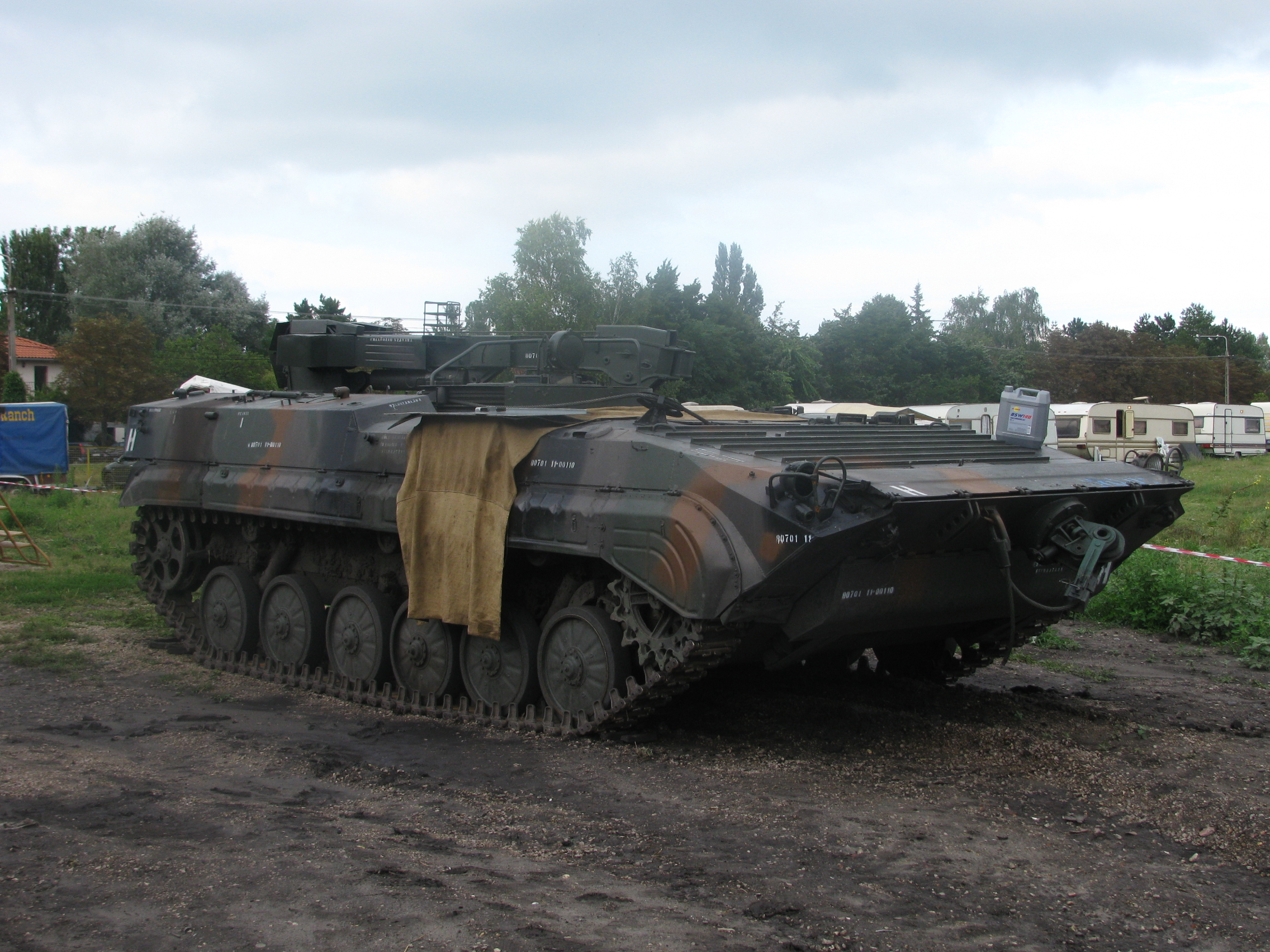
VPV

- VPV (VPV stands for vyprošťovací pásové vozidlo) – An ARV conversion (from a BVP-I), developed at the ZTS Martin Research and Development Institute. Production commenced at the plant (which is now in Slovakia), in 1984. It is equipped with a 5 tonne powered crane, a heavy winch, and a wider than normal troop compartment. Hatches on top of the turret and the troop compartment have been removed. The vehicle is divided into four compartments: engine, commander's, driver's and repair/cargo. The crew consists of a commander/crane operator, driver/welder/slinger and a logistician/mechanic. The vehicle is armed with a pintle-mounted 7.62 mm PKT machine gun. Many VPV's are based on the BVP-2.
  - SVO (SVO stands for samohybný výbušný odminovač) – A BVP-1 converted into a mine clearing vehicle. It does not have a turret and is fitted with a Hedgehog type of launcher for 24x245 mm Cv-OŠ-SVO FAE-rockets in the rear troop compartment (each rocket weighs 41.5 kg). The first launched rocket has a range from 350 m to 530 m. The last rocket has a range from 250 m to 430 m. All 24 rockets can be ripple-fired within 64 seconds. The cleared area is a 5 m × 100 m corridor. The operator has a work station in the right hand side of the rear of the hull. The combat weight of the vehicle has increased from 13.5 tonnes to 13.83 tonnes.
  - "Bouře III" – A PsyOps vehicle with its turret replaced by a raised plinth with a retractable loudspeaker system. There is a cupola with periscopes at the rear. It is also known under the designation BMP-1B.
  - OT-90 – An APC variant with the turret from an OT-64 2A, it is armed with 14,5mm KPVT and 7,62mm PKT machine guns, it is non-amphibious.
    - DTP-90 (DTP-90 stands for dílna technické pomoci – 90) – It is a maintenance version of the OT-90, the turret is replaced by various stowage boxes on the top of the hull.
      - DTP-90M (DTP-90 stands for dílna techniké pomoci – 90) – A more specialised maintenance version with a raised roof line and a light crane.
    - DP-90 (DP-90 stands for dělostřelecká pozorovatelna – 90) – Is an artillery direction version of the OT-90. It has a fixed BMP-1 turret with the main armament removed.
    - MU-90 (MU-90 stands for minový ukladač – 90 – "Mine Layer – 90") – A mine-laying version of the OT-90. The turret-less hull has bins on the roof over the turret ring. The troop compartment is fitted with stowage racks for 100 PT Mi-U and PT Mi-Ba-III anti-tank mines and a mine-laying chute which is fitted to the base of the right hand side rear door, it is only capable of surface laying. It also has a single antenna mounted on the left rear side of the hull.
    - OZ-90 or OT-90ZDR (zdravotní) – Ambulance – An OT-90 without a turret.
    - VP-90 (VP-90 stands for velitelská pozorovatelna – 90) – Is a command and reconnaissance version of the OT-90 fitted with R-123M, R-107T and RF-10 radios. Two firing ports have been retained, one in the center of the right hand side of the vehicle and one in the rear left. It also has a base for a slim mast antenna on the right hand side at the rear.
    - ZT 90 – ARV based on the OT-90.
    - ZV-90 – Is a charging station for tank and truck batteries. It has an auxiliary power unit (APU) mounted on the hull's roof.

=== Czech Republic ===
BMP models of the Czech Republic.

- BVP-1MA – Czech modernized BVP-1 with a German Kuka E8 one-man turret with prominent overhang on the front and eight smoke grenade launchers (in two groups, four groups on each side of the turret). It is armed with a 30 mm Mk 44 Bushmaster II autocannon with a small circular muzzle-brake. The gunner's position is located at the rear of the turret. It has new side-skirts/mudguards. It also has additional protection and hand rails on the headlights. It has two rear-view mirrors in the front and four stop lights and two turn lights at the rear. It is also known under the designation BVP-1MB.
- Tania – Czech upgrade built by the Caliber company of Prague.
- OT-90M1 – Czech modernization of the OT-90, fitted with an IR searchlight on top of the turret.
  - OT-90M2 – Czech modernization of the OT-90, has a raised superstructure, additional armour and two IR searchlights on the turret.
    - OT-90M3 – A Czech modernization of the OT-90.
- BVP-1SM – BVP-1 converted into a turretless, armored ambulance.
- BVP-1 See previous entry.
- BVP-1PPK or PzPK "Snĕžka" (PPK and PzPK stands for průzkumný a pozoravací komplet) – Is a Czech BVP-1 converted into an artillery reconnaissance vehicle. It can detect, recognize and track both moving and stationary targets, observe the fall of shot and other tasks. It has a 14 m hydraulic arm mounted on the roof of the superstructure at the rear of the vehicle. The mast mounts observation equipment and a sensor system which includes a laser range finder, TV cameras for day and night operations, a thermal camera, a wind velocity measuring unit and the BR 2140 X-band battlefield surveillance radar. Internal equipment includes a land navigation system, GPS navigation units, optical sights and real-time data transmission equipment. It entered service in 1997.
- OT R-5 "Bečva" (OT R-5 stands for obrněný transportér radiovůz – 5 – "Armored Personnel Carrier Radio Vehicle – 5") – Czech-built command vehicle with a superstructure in place of the troop compartment. It is equipped with R-130, R-123, R-173, RF-10 and RDM 61M HV/VHF radios. The main armament consist of a 12.7 mm DShK 1938/46 heavy machine gun. The crew has increased from three to five.
  - OT R-5M (OT R-5 stands for obrněný transportér radiovůz – 5 – "Armoured Personnel Carrier Radio Vehicle – 5")
    - OT R-5M1p (OT R-5 stands for obrněný transportér radiovůz – 5 – "Armoured Personnel Carrier Radio Vehicle – 5")
- MPP 40p BVP (MPP stands for mobilní přístupová provozovna) – A Czech signals vehicle based on the BVP-1 AMB-S armored ambulance. It entered service in 2002. Specialized radio equipment consists of one RF 1301 (1W), two RF 1325 (25W)s, one NM 1301and one R-150S HF; it is also fitted with one TR 13 telephone, one TS 13 telephone, four TD 13 telephones, one RM 13 telephone, one GPR 22 navigation device, ten TPA 97 analog field telephones and four TPD 97 digital field telephones.
- BVP-1 LOS (light observation system) – Is a Czech-built reconnaissance vehicle based on the DP-90 equipped with three smoke grenade launchers on each side of the turret, GPS, a generator and a computer. It also has an elevatable telescopic mast mounted on the dummy unmanned BVP-2 turret with a day/night television camera, a laser rangefinder and a laser target marker. Antennae mounts on each side of the rear part of the hull's roof are also available. The Czech army plans to deploy these vehicles in BVP-2 companies, hence the similarity to the BVP-2.
- MGC-1 a.k.a. MGC-14,5 (machine gun carrier) – Upgraded BMP-1/BVP-1 with additional armour ERA or NXRA, slat armour, improved mine protection and a modified turret with 14.5 mm machine gun KPVT and 7.62 mm PKT coaxial machine gun. A technology demonstrator of the MGC-1 was presented by the Czech firm Excalibur Army during IDET-2011.
- BVP Šakal (also known as MEXCA or BVP-M2 SKCZ Šakal) – A major overhaul variant developed by Excalibur Army. Roof was raised by 15 cm, which allowed installation of addition armour to floor, fixing a major vulnerability of BMP series. Both rear doors have been replaced by a single ramp style door. Weapon Turret can be either an unmanned turret Turra-30 of Slovak-origin with 30mm auto-cannon and coaxial 7,62mm machine gun or one-man turret DVK-30 with 30mm auto-cannon and coaxial 7,62mm machine gun. Engine is Caterpillar C9.3 with 300 kW. Due to a resolution of the Czech and Slovak government to instead of modernising their fleet of BVPs, choosing to buy CV90 from Sweden resulted in only two prototypes being built. One with unmanned turret and one with manned turret.

=== Egypt ===
- BMP-1S – Is a BMP-1 fitted with a French Poyaud 520 6L CS2 diesel engine developing 310 hp (231 kW) at 2,800 rpm. 200 Egyptian BMP-1s were upgraded from 1979 onward.

=== Finland ===
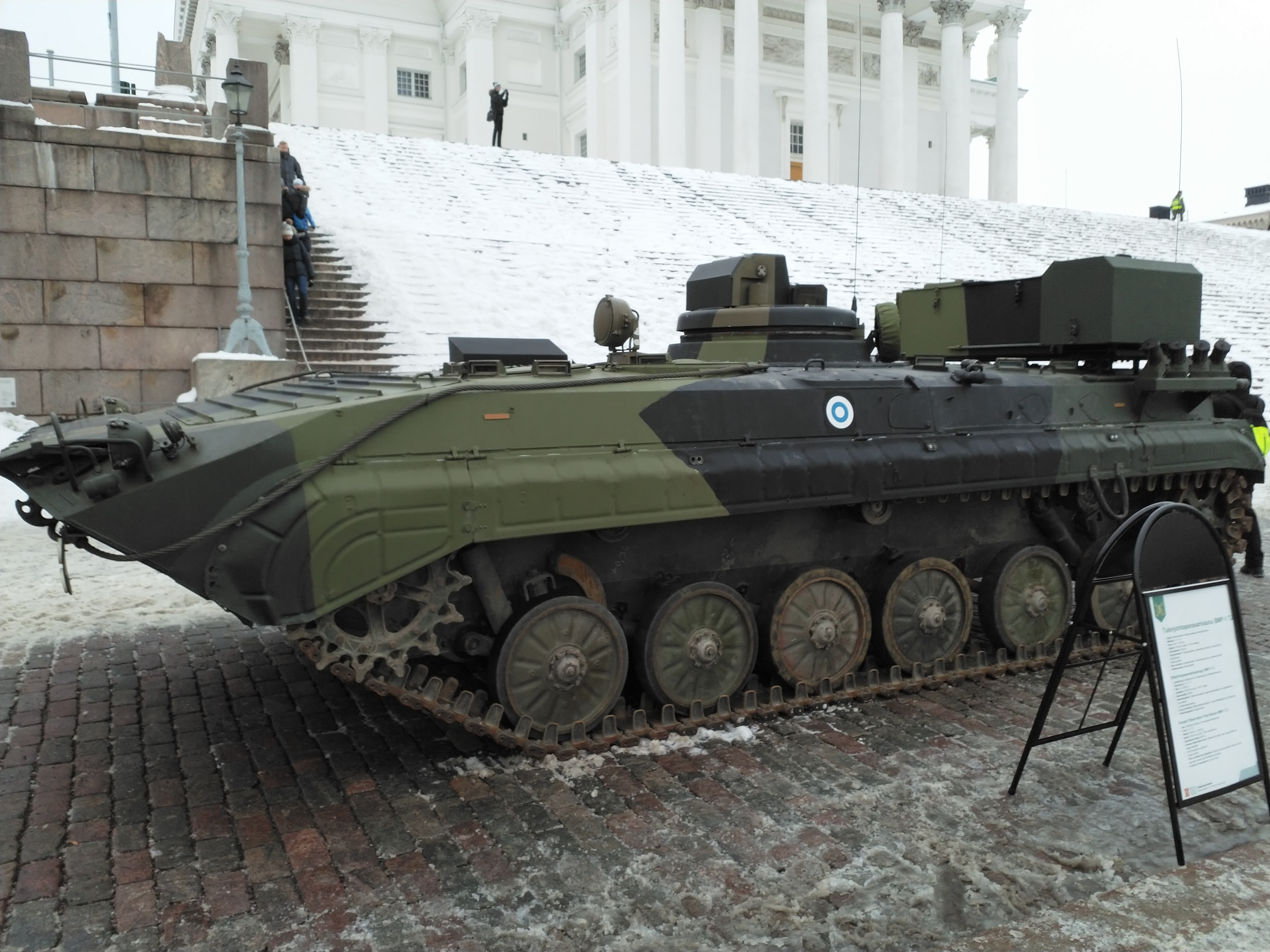
A BMP-1 TJ artillery observation vehicle.

- BMP-1 – Has six stop lights but no autoloader.
- BMP-1PS – Finland has modified all its BMP-1s and BMP-1Ps to BMP-1PS and BMP-1K1 level (q.v.). The former is similar to the original BMP-1P but has four additional 76 mm Wegmann smoke grenade launchers on the right front of the turret and two Lyran 71 mm mortars on the left rear. Both versions are without the autoloader.
- BMP-1TJ "Tuija" – Is an artillery reconnaissance vehicle.
- BMP-1TJJ – Is also an artillery reconnaissance vehicle.
- BMP-1KPD – Command vehicle.
- BMP-25 – BMP-1 with a Delco LAV-25 -style turret mounting a 25 mm M242 Bushmaster autocannon. Prototype only.

=== former East Germany ===
- BMP-1 SP-1 – NVA Designation for the Soviet BMP-1 (Ob.765Sp1).
- BMP-1 SP-2 – NVA designation for the Soviet BMP-1 (Ob.765Sp2).
- BMP-1P/c – NVA designation for 151 BMP-1Ps built in Czechoslovakia.
- BMP-1P/d – NVA designation for locally upgraded BMP-1s. Externally identical to the BMP-1P/c but without the mounts for the KMT-10 mine plow.
- BMP-MTP – NVA designation for the Czechoslovak VPV armored recovery vehicle.

=== East Germany / Germany ===
- BMP-1A1 Ost – After reunification, the German Bundeswehr modified 581 vehicles (mainly P models) to bring them up to western safety standards. The fuel tanks in the rear doors were filled with foam, new driving lights, rear-view mirrors, and MB smoke grenade launchers were fitted. The ATGM launcher was removed. It is also sometimes incorrectly called the BMP-1A2. After disbanding of several German Panzergrenadier-units, the BMP-1A1 Ost were replaced with Marder 1A3s. Some 500 were sold to Greece, a small number to Finland.

=== Greece ===
- BMP-1A1 Ost – Was exported to Greece. The vehicle has some external differences from the German BMP-1A1 Ost. 350 were purchased. they are sometimes called BMP-1A1GR – Greece transferred 32 vehicles to the New Iraqi army in 2006.
  - BMP-1A1 Ost – Also exported to Greece, they are equipped with a M2 Browning .50 caliber heavy machine gun and fitted with a modified turret hatch. They are sometimes called the BMP-1A1GR1.
  - In late 2014, a number of BMP-1A1 Ost were fitted with the ZU-23-2 anti-aircraft gun in place of the standard tower. After successful acceptance tests, the conversion of more vehicles is planned.

=== Hungary ===
- BMP-1F – Slightly modified BMP-1. It carries a reconnaissance team (3–5 soldiers) and their equipment.

=== India ===
- BMP-1 – Produced in India. It has a slightly different turret design.
  - BMP-1 – Has a mount for a Bren light machine gun on the rear of the turret.

=== Iran ===
- Boragh – Reverse engineered BMP-1 or Type 86 (WZ-501) converted into an APC. It is very similar to the Chinese WZ-503 APC. It has a V-8 turbocharged diesel engine which delivers 330 hp (246 kW). It also has road wheels from the US M113 APC. Its combat weight was reduced to 13 tonnes. Other upgrades include a higher road speed and stronger armor. The number of passengers was increased from 8 to 12. A 12.7 mm DShK 1938/46 heavy machine gun (1,000 rounds) serves as a main weapon.

=== Iraq ===
- Saddam – Iraqi BMP-1 upgrade that was first shown at the Baghdad exhibition in 1989. The upgrade fits appliqué armor (which weighs 1,250 kg), to the sides of the hull to provide protection against 12.7 mm and 14.5 mm armor-piercing rounds fired from a range of 200 m. Spaces were cut out to allow the transported infantry to fire their small arms through the firing ports. It never went into production as the additional armor overloaded the chassis and a replacement engine capable of handling this extra weight wasn't available.
- Saddam II – Iraqi BMP-1 upgrade with rubber sideskirts, additional armor on the upper hull sides and an ATU box fitted to the left side of the rear of the hull. These vehicles were mainly used by the Iraqi Republican Guard.
- BMP-1 – Armored ambulance. The turret was removed while the rear part of the vehicle was extended to allow easier transportation of stretchers and walking wounded. The original BMP-1 rear doors were removed and replaced by two new and higher doors that do not contain the integral fuel tanks. The vehicle did not enter service in large numbers.

=== Israel ===
- BMP-1 fitted with the CARDOM 120/81 mm mortar system. The turret has been removed, the mortar and the recoil system protrude from the open compartment. It was built by Soltam.
- BMP-1 upgrade designed by Nimda fitting it with new power unit and automatic transmission which improves both mobility and reliability.

=== North Korea ===
Korshun – The North Korean designation for the BMP-1.

=== Polish People's Republic / Poland ===
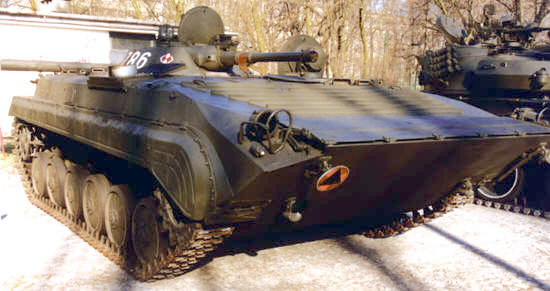
BWP-1

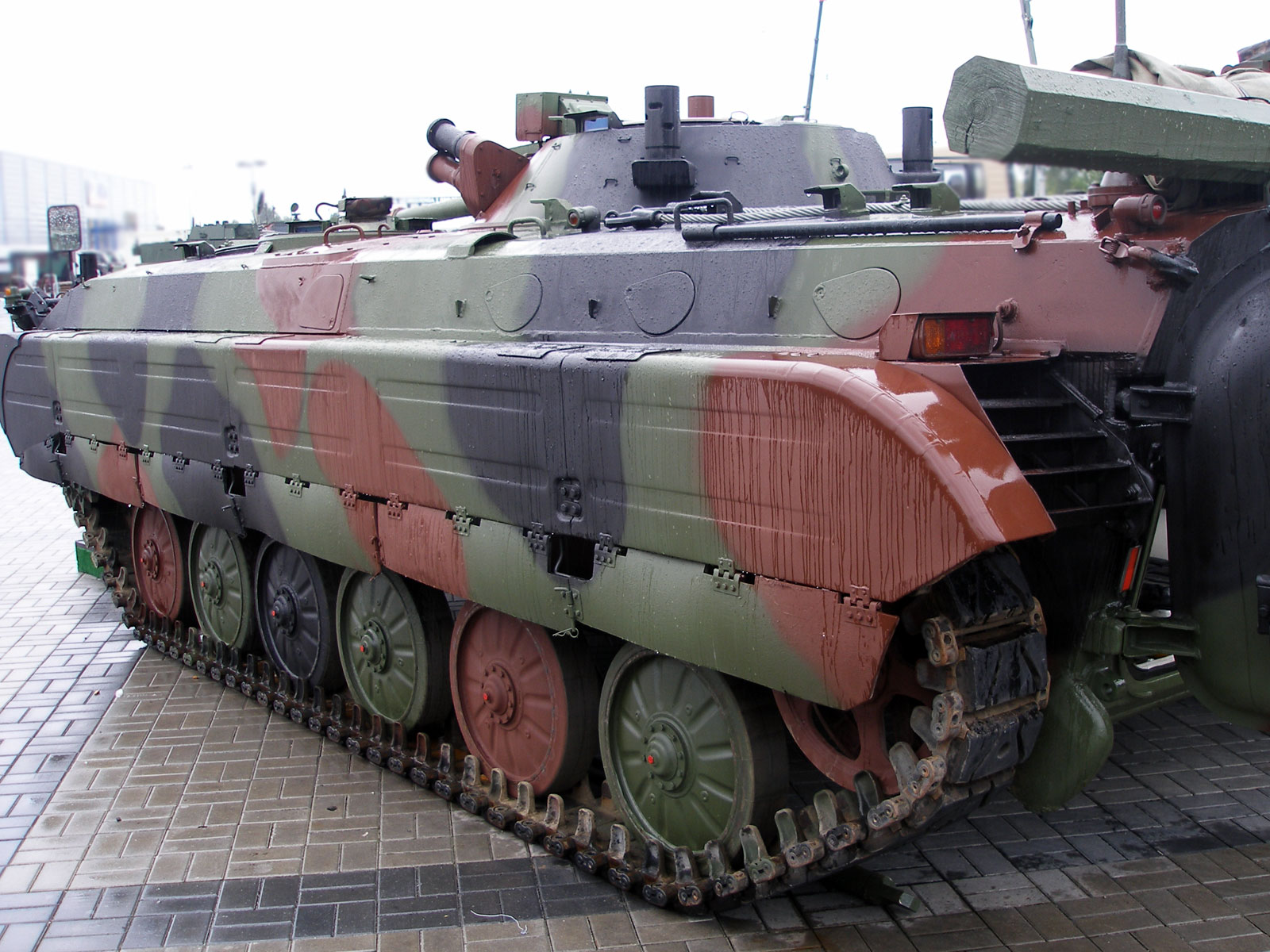
BWP-1M "Puma", note the floats.

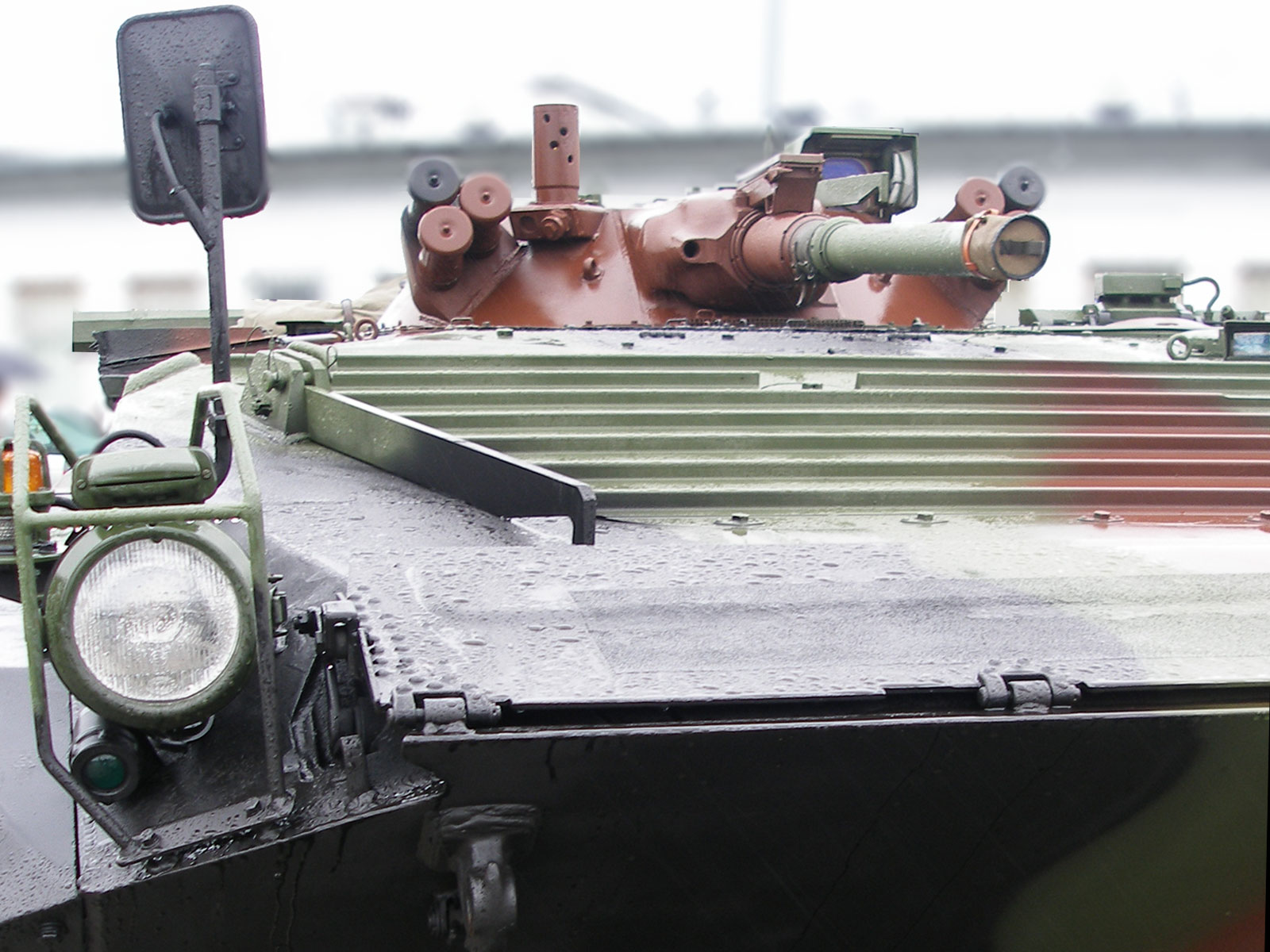
BWP-1M "Puma", note the six 81 mm shrapnel grenade launchers, a new day–night sight for the gunner and the rear-view mirror.

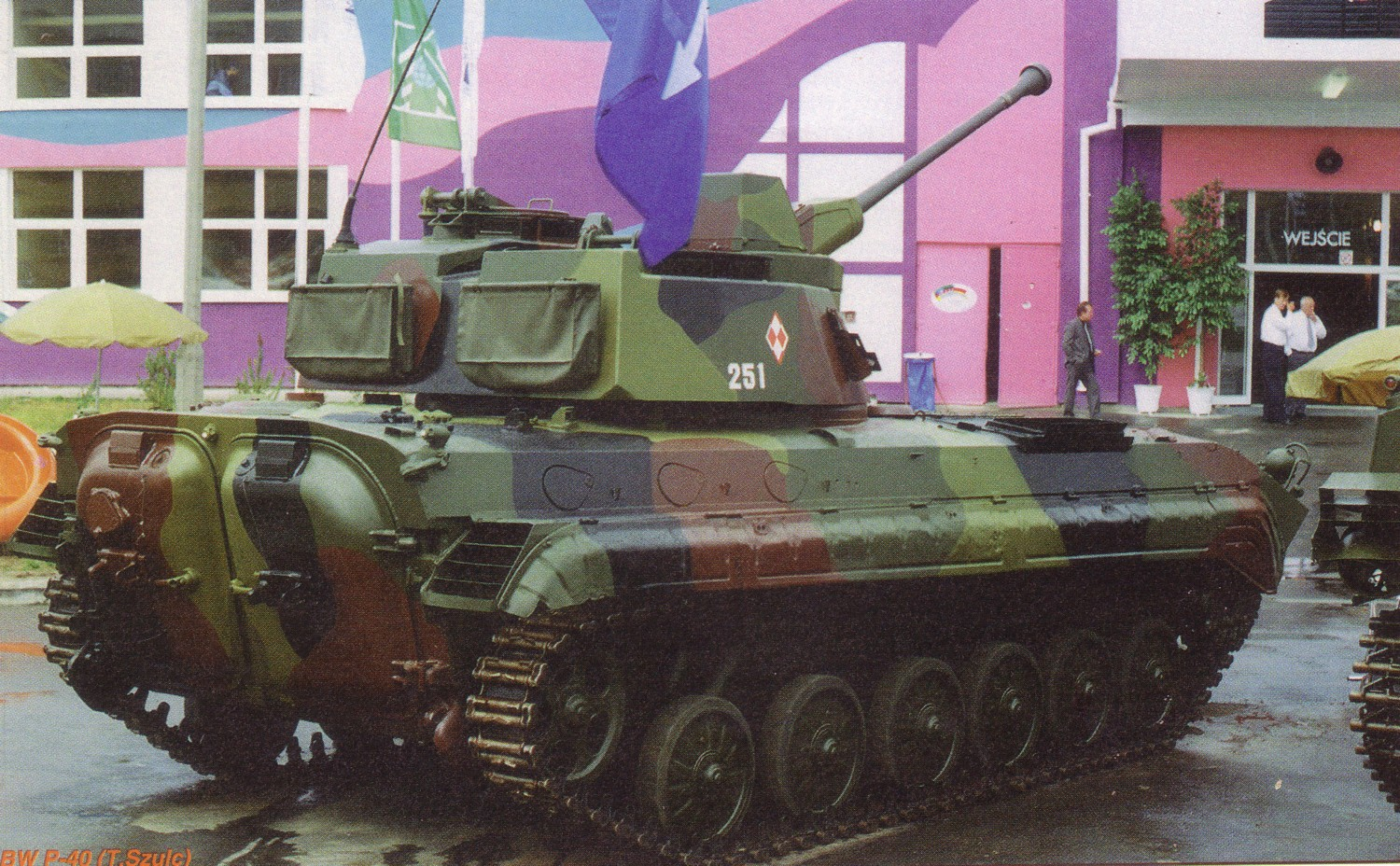
BWP-40 prototype during MSPO 1993 in Kielce.

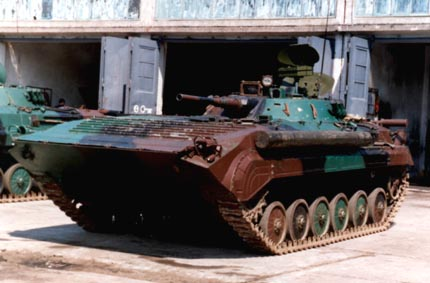
BWR-1D reconnaissance vehicle.

- BWP-1 (BWP-1 stands for Bojowy Wóz Piechoty-1 – "Infantry Fighting Vehicle – 1") – The Polish designation for a Soviet BMP-1 (Ob'yekt 765Sp2 and later Ob'yekt 765Sp3).
  - BWP-1 fitted with a 7.62 mm PK machine gun on top of the mantlet of the 73 mm 2A28 Grom low pressure smoothbore short-recoil semi-automatic gun. It is used by the Polish detachment of KFOR.
  - BWP-1 fitted with a 7.62 mm PK machine gun on top of the turret. It is also used by the Polish detachment of KFOR.
  - BWP-1 fitted with a 7.62 mm PK machine gun on the front of the hull. It too, is used by the Polish detachment of KFOR.
  - BWP-1 experimentally fitted with the Dragar turret with chamfered sides, front and rear.
  - BWP-1M "Puma 1" (BWP-1M stands for Bojowy Wóz Piechoty-1 Modernizacja – "Infantry Fighting Vehicle – 1 Modernization") – Polish modernization of the BWP-1. It has an anti-slip covering which helps the crew when walking on the armor, an independent system for heating the crew compartment, engine and fuel compartments, fire and explosion protection systems, knives for crew members to fight-off infantry trying to disable the vehicle while it is driving with its top hatches opened, a way clearing system, a night vision device for the driver, an electrical system adjusted to connect to a firing simulator, a new integrated NBC protection system, a system designed to provide the occupants with protection against the light pulse of a close-range nuclear explosion, a new day/night sight, a socket enabling a quick diagnostic check of the engine, a covering over the protruding sharp edges of periscopes, doors and hatches, which increases the driving comfort, elastomer bumpers and shock absorbers which increase the service life of the suspension, six 81 mm shrapnel grenade launchers on the sides of the turret (three on each side), facing forwards, an on-board terminal, an integrated intercom enabling communication between crew members, signalling alarms, phonic external communication of the crew via an on-board radio, on-board systems control, a phonic external wire-communication, full data transmission in radio networks, wire networks and between on-board systems and satellite navigation, an integrated ultra-short wave on-board radio with frequency hopping, external lights which enables driving on public roads, flotation side-skirts which increase displacement of the vehicle while moving in the water and its resistance to splinters as well as bullets and small caliber missiles, a laser warning receiver, a power unit module enabling its quick replacement in the field (around 60 minutes), using regular resources available to repair sub-units, a modernised vision device for the commander, rubber track pads enabling driving on public roads without destroying the road surface, a LITEF navigation system and two rear-view mirrors. Later Puma vehicles featured a slightly improved UTD-20 engine which could be removed in the field in 45 minutes. In 2005 Puma vehicles received a new Iveco engine.
    - BWP-1M "Puma 1" experimentally fitted with the Delco turret armed with a 25 mm autocannon.
    - BWP-1M "Puma 1" experimentally fitted with the Israeli-developed OWS-25 one-man Overhead Weapon System, armed with a 25 mm autocannon, an ATGM launcher for two ATGMs, a 7.62 mm coaxial machine gun and six smoke grenade launchers.
    - BWP-1M "Puma 1" fitted with the Italian TC-25 Hitfist turret.
    - BWP-1M "Puma 1" experimentally fitted with the United Defence turret with a chamfered front.
    - BWP-1 "Puma E-8" – Is a Polish modernization of the BWP-1 with all the improvements from the BWP-1M except it has thirteen 81 mm shrapnel grenade launchers instead of six (three on the left hand side of the turret, four on the right, three on the left hand side of the hull and three on the right) and a slab-sided one-man E-8 turret armed with a 30 mm autocanon. It has a large ammunition drum with an outboard machine gun mount on the right hand side of the main armament. It also has wire cutters installed on the top of each side of the hull.
    - BWP-1 "Puma RCWS-30" – It is a Polish modernization of the BWP-1 with all the improvements from the BWP-1M except the 81 mm shrapnel grenade launchers. It is fitted with the Israeli Samson RCWS-30 remote controlled weapons station. It is armed with a 30 mm autocannon and a 7.62 mm RAFAEL machine gun. The autocannon can be elevated or depressed between −20° and +60°. The weapons station can turn with a speed of 1 rad/s. It also has day–night sights and an electric stabilization system. The vehicle is equipped with a SSP-1 OBRA laser warning receiver. The turret slightly increases the overall height of the vehicle to 2.45 m.
    - BWP-1 "Puma MW-30" is a Polish modernization of the BWP-1 with all the improvements from the BWP-1M except the 81 mm shrapnel grenade launchers. It is fitted with an unmanned MW-30 turret. The new turret weighs 1.5 tonnes and is armed with a 30 mm Mk44 Bushmaster II autocannon which fires 30 × 173 mm ammunition and the 7.62 mm UKM-2000C machine gun. The turret is also equipped with six smoke grenade launchers. The turret can operate safely in temperatures from −40 °C to +50 °C.
  - BWP-40 – It is a Polish BWP-1/CV9040 hybrid. It combines a CV9040 turret with a BWP-1 hull. It was designed in the early 1990s. The only prototype was finished by 1993.
  - BWP-95 – It is a BWP-1 fitted with an overhead mount armed with a 23 mm cannon and a recoilless rifle. It has a heavy machine gun mount with slab mantlet fitted to the turret front. There are also MB smoke grenade launchers on each side of the turret. To increase the vehicle's protection ERA was fitted to the turret front, hull front and sides. The vehicle never got past the prototype stage.
  - BWP-1D – The Polish designation for the Soviet BMP-1K.
  - BWR-1S (BWR-1S stands for Bojowy Wóz Rozpoznawczy-1 Svatawa – "Reconnaissance Fighting Vehicle – 1 Svatava") – The Polish designation for the Czechoslovak BPzV "Svatava".
  - BWR-1D (BWR-1D stands for Bojowy Wóz Rozpoznawczy-1 Dowodzenie – "Reconnaissance Fighting Vehicle – 1 Command") – Polish designation for the Soviet BRM-1K. It is also known as the BWR-1K.
  - ZWDSz-2 (ZWDSz stands for Zautomatyzowany Wóz Dowódczo Sztabowy-2 – Automated Staff Command Vehicle) – Modernised MP-31, fitted with new equipment, including TRC 9500 (VHF) and RF-5200 (HF) radios, a TDR-20K computer; AP-82, AP-92 and CAT-U telephones and a RK-128/2 generator. The telescopic mast was removed.
- BWP-1S – Modernized variant equipped with two thermal imagers, two TV cameras, a laser rangefinder, an artillery fire detector and new radios. The vehicle also has a GPS satellite navigation system, a smoke screen generator, a data transmitting unit, a camouflaging coating and other pieces of new hardware.
- BMP-1AK – Upgraded variant with improved internal layout and additional anti-cumulative and anti-HEAT protection. It is equipped with improved night vision systems and new tactical radios.

=== Romania ===
- MLI-84 – Upgraded Romanian produced version of the BMP-1 with a new stronger engine, bigger fuel capacity and DShK on a rotatable mount fitted on the left rear troop compartment roof hatch.
- MLI-84M1 JDERUL – MLI-84 modernization fitted with a new Israeli OWS-25R overhead mount turret armed with 25 mm Oerlikon KBA autocannon and two 9M14-2T "Maljutka-2T" or Spike ATGMs, four 81 mm DLG 81 heat and smoke grenade launchers, and a smoke discharger.

=== Slovakia ===
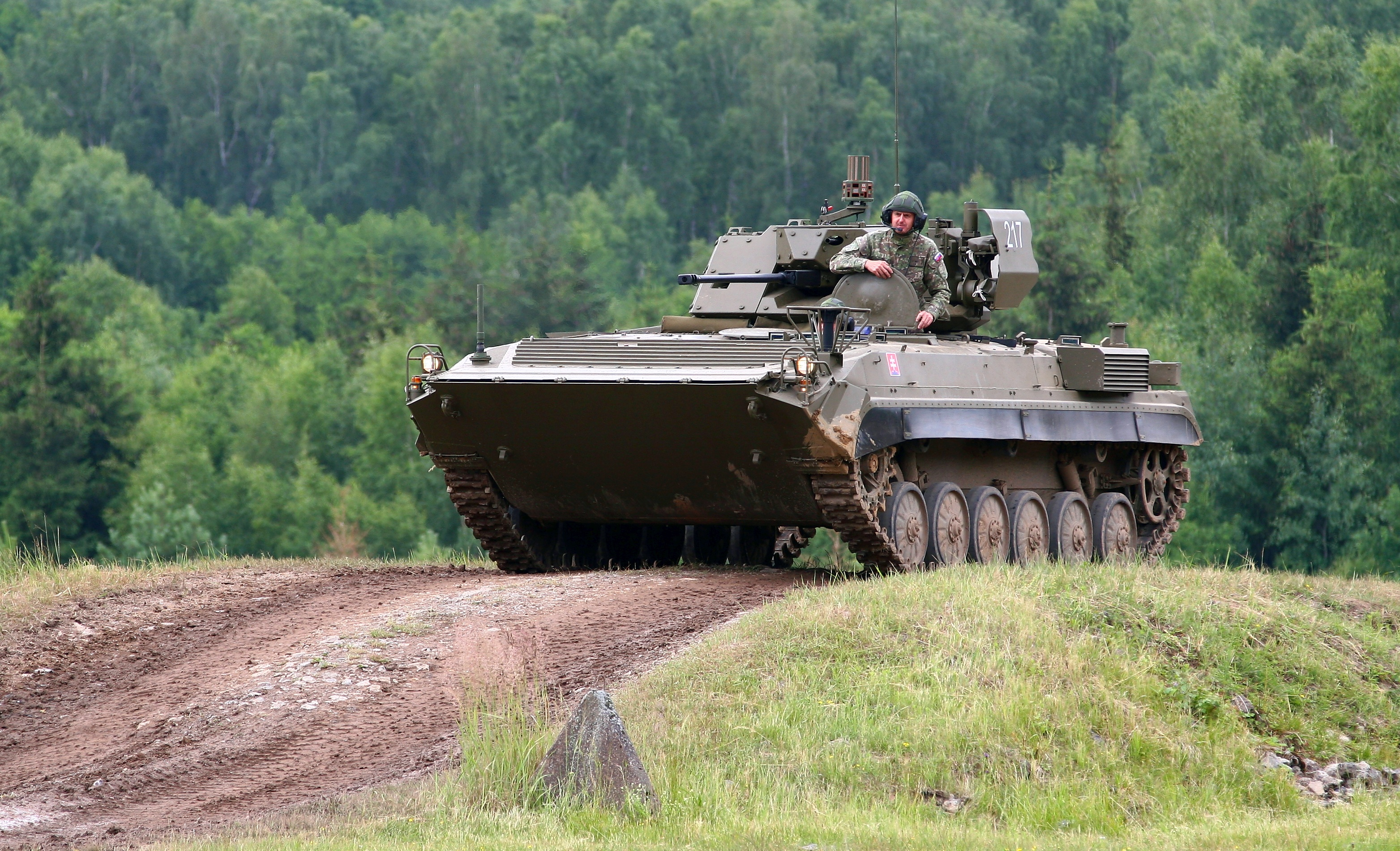
Slovak BVP-M at BAHNA 2018.

BMP models of Slovakia.

- BVP-1 – Equipped with the 2A48 Cobra overhead mount modular one-man gun turret. It is a co-operation project between Slovakia and Belarus.
  - BVP-1 – Equipped with the 2A48 Cobra overhead mount modular one-man turret and flotation sides-skirts/mudguards from BVP-2. Also a co-operation project between Slovakia and Belarus.
  - BVP-1 – Equipped with the 2A48 Cobra overhead mount modular one-man turret, additional armour and ERA on the sides of the hull. Co-operation project between Slovakia and Belarus.
- OT-90M "Zarmod" – An OT-90 APC fitted with an overhead-mount turret armed with a 14.5 mm KPVT machine gun, 7.62 mm PKT machine gun and a 9P135M1 (Spigot) ATGM launcher.
  - BVP-1M – Different name for OT-90M "Zarmod" (q.v.).
- DPK-90 (DPK stands for Delostrelecký Prieskumný Komplet) – Slovak artillery forward observer vehicle with thermal imaging camera mounted in an armored box on the front of the turret with a CCD camera. The armament was replaced by a built-in optical sight mount on top of the turret. It also has a mast mount on the right hand side of the rear of the troop compartment's roof. It was developed in 1994.
- ZDR – The Slovak designation for the Czechoslovak AMB-S four-stretcher armored ambulance.
- BVP-1CAS of the Voluntary Fire Brigade DHZ POLE Trnava, adjusted for fire fighting missions in difficult terrain, capable to undertake fire fighting missions with water from its own tank, utilising a built-in mobile high-pressure nozzle and remotely controlled carriage
- BPsVI – Upgraded version of BPsV Svatava with the original turret replaced by Turra 30 turret that is armed with 30mm 2A42 autocannon, Konkurs ATGM, and 7.62mm PKT machine gun. It is equipped with a sensor suite which includes a surveillance radar, a weather meter, a Micro Falcon unmanned aerial vehicle (UAV), a mine detection system and a ground sensor system.
- BVP-M – Identical to BPsVI except that it's intended for mechanized brigades instead of reconnaisance, and is fitted with an additional COAPS commander sight.

=== South Africa ===
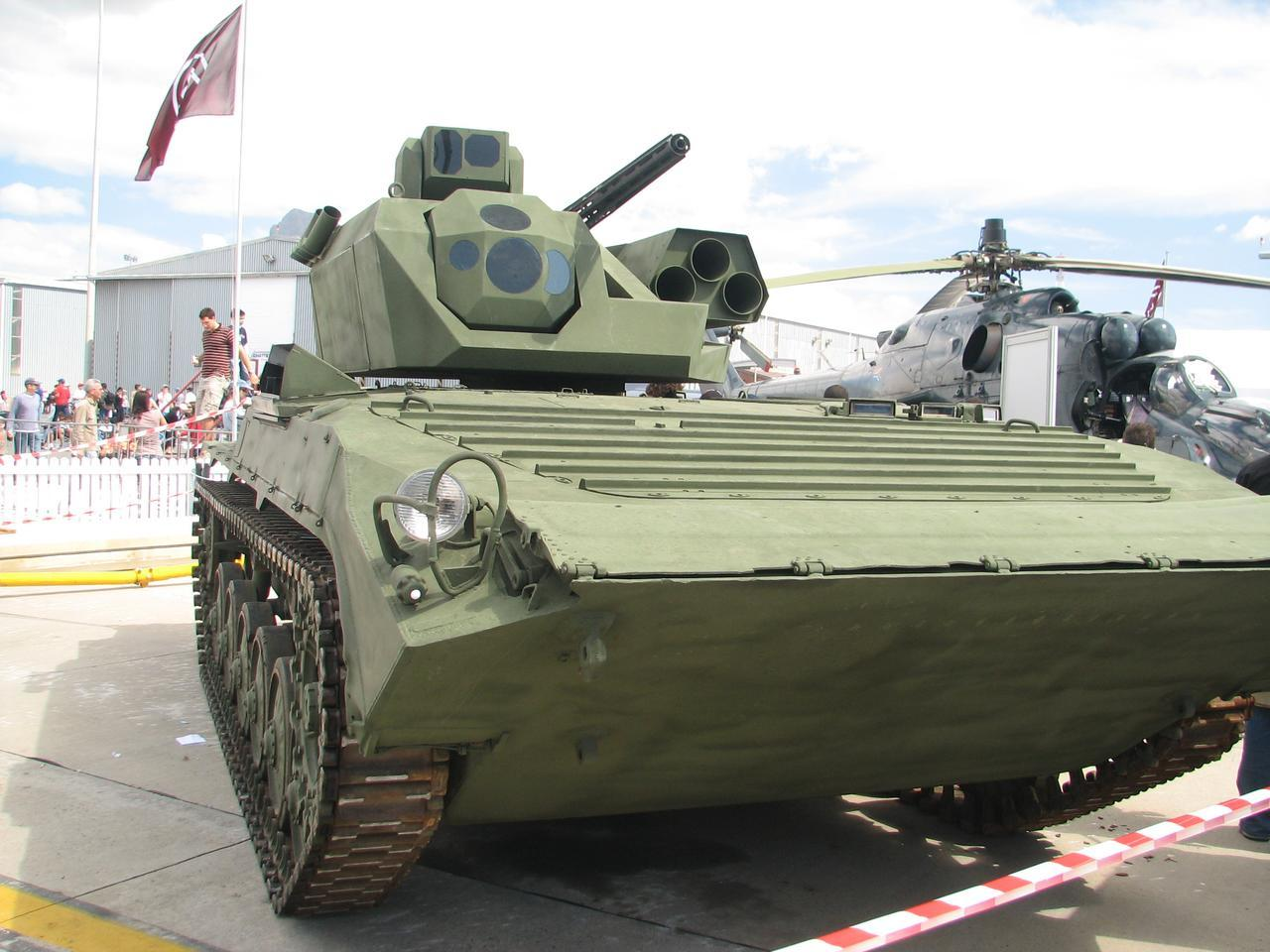
A South African BMP-1 fitted with the IST Dynamics UMWP.

- BMP-1 – Fitted with the IST Dynamics Unmanned Multi-Weapon Platform armed with a 30 mm 2A72 autocannon, one 7.62 mm PKT coaxial machine gun, an ATGM launcher for three Denel Ingwe ATGMs on the left-hand-side of the weapons station and a 40 mm Denel-Vektor automatic grenade launcher. Its vision devices include a day/night gunner's sight incorporating the missile guidance unit and a panoramic primary stabilized commander's sight. It is also fitted with a digital ballistic fire control computer. This vehicle was shown at the 2006 Africa Aerospace and Defence exhibition but only with a dummy of the weapons station.

=== Sweden ===
- Pbv 501 (Pbv stands for pansarbandvagn) – Swedish designation for 350 BMP-1A1s bought from Germany.
  - Pbv 501A – Between 1999 and 2001, VOP 026 from the Czech Republic modified 350 Pbv 501s for the Swedish army. The Pbv 501A has a slightly modified engine and transmission, and is stripped of asbestos. The vehicle was fitted with new weapon racks, driving lights and side skirts, while the 9K11 or 9K111 ATGM system was removed. Safety standards were also improved.
    - Pbv 501A Command variant.

=== Ukraine ===
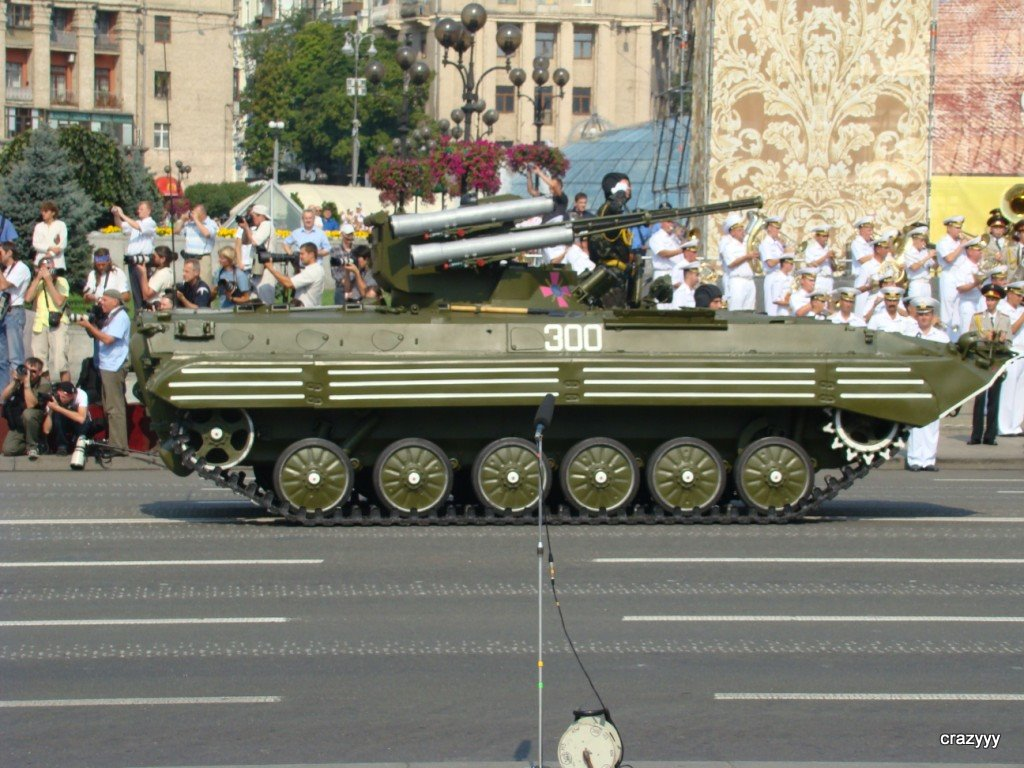
BMP-1U

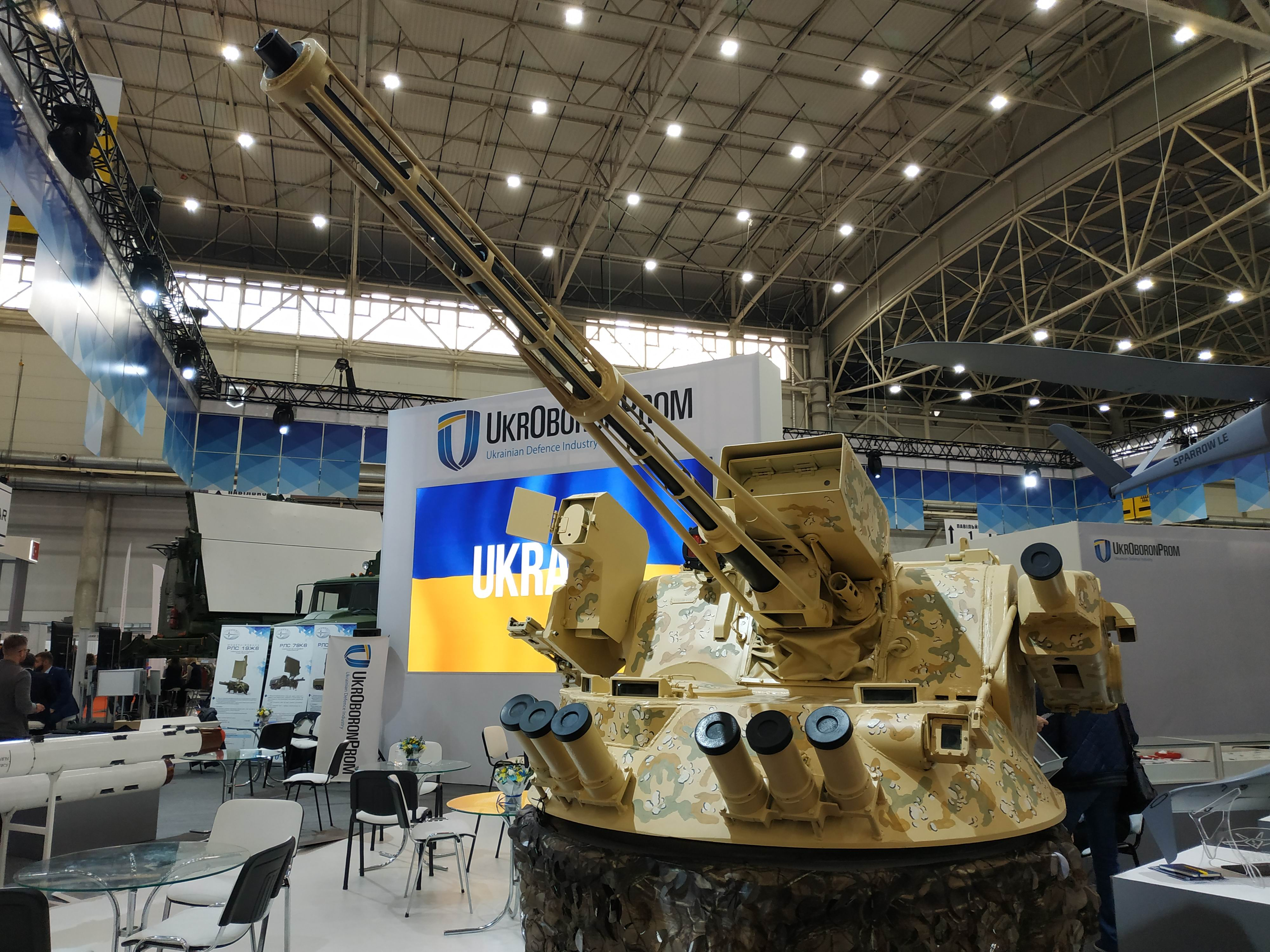
The Shkval remote weapon stations.

- BMP-1AK – A Ukrainian upgrade of the BMP-1P fitted with smoke grenade launchers and the AGS- 17 Plamya automatic grenade launcher.
- BMP-1U – A limited Ukrainian upgrade of the BMP-1 developed by the State Scientific and Technical Centre of Artillery and Small Arms in Kyiv. The original turret was replaced with the new KBA-105 Shkval ('squall') remote weapon station (RWS) which was developed for light armoured vehicles to increase their combat effectiveness. This turret system was first displayed publicly at the IDEX 2001 arms exhibition held in Abu Dhabi, demonstrated on the wheeled BTR-3U APC. It superficially resembles the earlier Russian KBP Instrument Design Bureau TKB-799 Kliver one-man weapons station. The Shkval RWS is built mostly from domestic components and is armed with a 30 mm 2A72 automatic cannon (or the Ukrainian-produced ZTM-1 equivalent) with 360 rounds of ammunition carried onboard and a PKT 7.62 mm machine gun (or its domestic counterpart – the KT-7.62) with 2,500 rounds of ammunition provided. Two anti-tank guided missile (ATGM) launchers were mounted on the right side of the remote turret module, capable of firing the 9M113 Konkurs missile (with a further two reload tubes carried inside) and a 30 mm AGS-17 (or Ukrainian-made KBA-117) automatic grenade launcher was installed on the left side, supplied from an ammunition box with up to 116 rounds. Additionally, a bank of six (6) defensive 81 mm smoke grenade launchers was installed on the front, lower base of the turret module. The weapons are brought on target with the OTP-20 Cyclops-1 optical and TV-based aiming complex which includes an interface for ATGM guidance. The weapons are stabilized by a new, SVWU-500 Karusel system. The entire Shkval weapons station weighs 1,300 kg with a full ammunition load. Because the new weapons station is considerably larger than the standard BMP-1 turret and its equipment takes up more internal volume, the troop compartment was reduced with the number of dismounted infantry carried dropping from 8 to 6. The first pair of roof hatches cannot be opened. The vehicle also received minor automotive upgrades, including flotation sides-skirts/mudguards and drive sprockets and tracks from the BMP-2. These vehicles were first revealed to the public at an armed forces parade in Kyiv celebrating Ukraine's Independence Day (August 24) in 2001 with the participation of 10 of these IFVs. In 2004, state trials of the type were concluded followed by an announcement that up to 400 BMP-1s would be upgraded to this configuration and equip 3 mechanized brigades. In reality, no more than 30 BMP-1Us were ever produced, with the Armed Forces of Ukraine only receiving 12 of these vehicles. The remaining 15 BMP-1Us were sold to Georgia in an agreement signed in 2007 and delivered prior to the 2008 Russian invasion of Georgia. Nearly all of these vehicles were lost to Russia, included 5 undamaged vehicles captured by the Russians in Gori. Three BMP-1U IFVs were sold to Chad and participated in the fighting against Islamic militants in 2013. It is unknown if any Ukrainian BMP-1Us were used in combat between 2014 and 2021. In April 2022, Russian state media showed what was claimed to be a trophy Ukrainian BMP-1U somewhere in Crimea with a "Z" marking. The painting of this BMP-1U indicated it may have been one of the earlier Georgian trophies.
- BMP-1M (Object 765UTB) – Evolved from the BMP-1U; unveiled in 2011. The main difference is the application of the improved KBA-105TB Shkval-A RWS in which the Konkurs ATGM launchers were replaced with the long range Ukrainian Barrier ATGM (effective range up to 5,000 m compared to 2,000 m for the Konkurs) and uses a new Tandem-2 sighting system and improved SWU-500-3C weapon stabilization system. The Tandem-2 sighting system uses two TV cameras: a narrow field-of-view (FOV) device called UTV (with a 6 km detection range for a tank-sized target and a 5 km identification range for the same) and a wide FOV ShTK camera which enables acquisition of tank-sized targets at 3 km. The system also includes a laser rangefinder. The TV-based system can operate in low-light conditions to some extent, but its performance is inferior to a proper thermal imaging system. This upgrade was offered by Zhytomyr Armour Plant for export customers, however, the only known client is Turkmenistan, which paraded the vehicles at a ceremony in 2016, implying the sale was never reported to the United Nations' arms control program. No details about the number of vehicles or transfer dates are known.

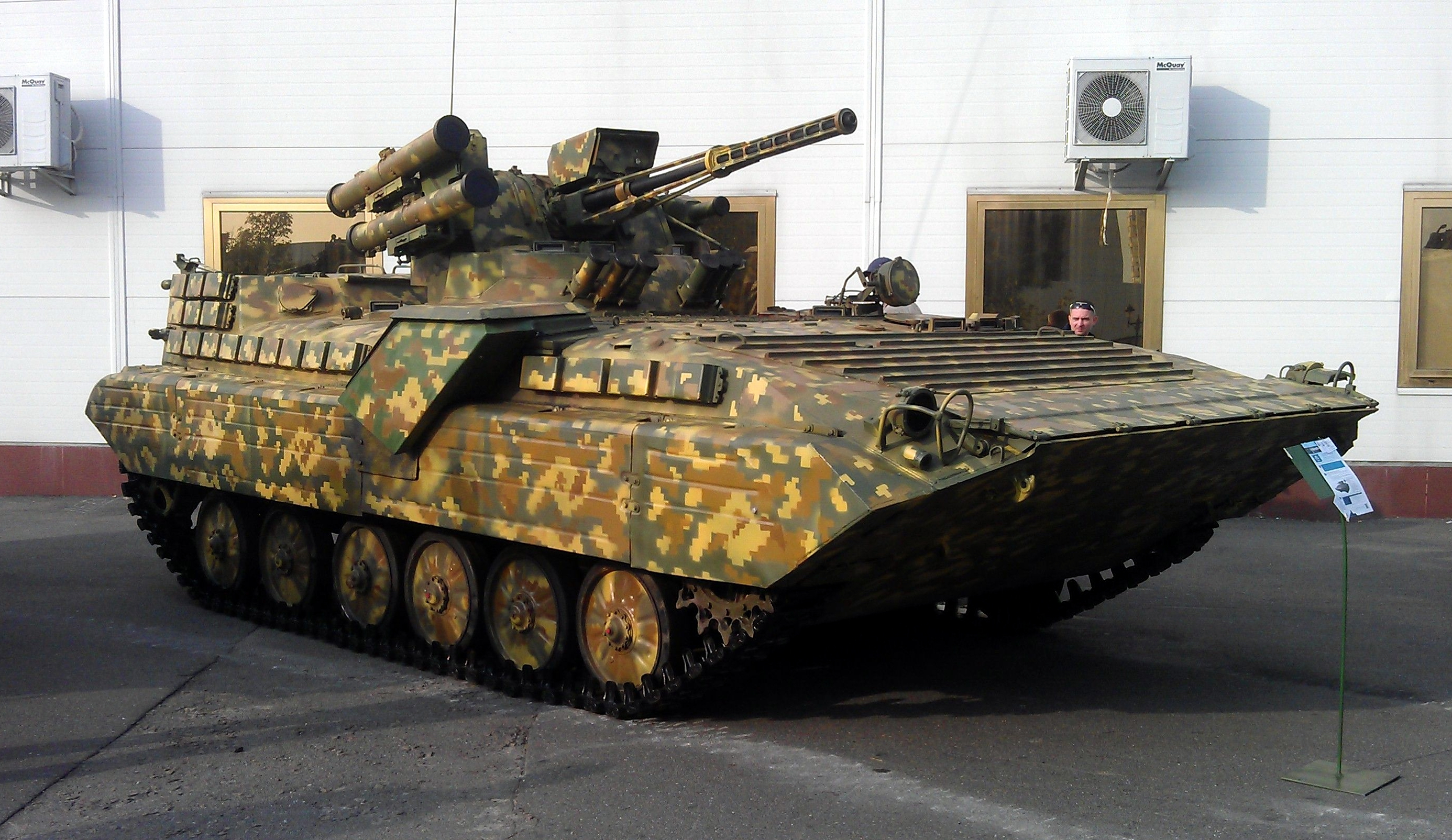
BMP-1UM developed by the Zhytomyr Armour Plant

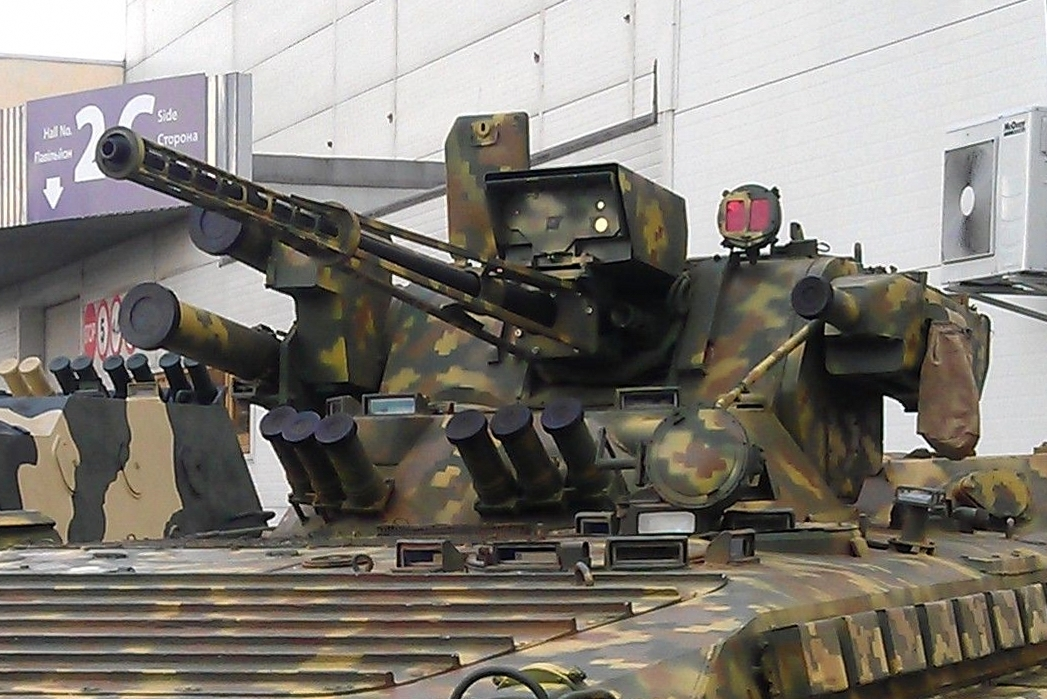
The Shkval-A remote weapon station used on the BMP-1UM

- BMP-1UM – A more comprehensive upgrade of the standard BMP-1 undertaken by the Zhytomyr Armour Plant and shown publicly in 2015. As in their previous BMP-1M, this vehicle features the Shkval-A RWS, but unlike previous attempts, considerable design efforts were made into improving the power plant and hull. The 300 hp UTD-20 engine was replaced with a 3-cylinder, two-stroke 3TD-2 diesel motor making 400 hp and sharing many parts with 5TDF and 6TD series tank engines in Ukrainian service. The troop compartment layout was improved by raising the hull roof by 15 cm, and the small, un-ergonomic egress doors at the rear of the BMP-1 were replaced by a large ramp, albeit manually operated. The external hull flanks of the IFV were lined with Kontakt-1 explosive reactive armour (ERA) bricks, which is considered questionable given the thin armour plate underlying these areas. Survivability of the troop compartment was further increased by relocating the fuel tanks separating troop seating and the hull flanks, installing larger side skirts, using an aramid fibre spall liner and providing an engineered structure under the floor of the troop compartment, designed to absorb/mitigate explosions from underneath the vehicle. The BMP-1UM was also given a SN-3003 GLONASS/GPS receiver. The commander's station TKN-3B sight was also modified to allow it to receive video feed from advanced cameras on the RWS. Finally, the vehicle's thermal signature was modified/reduced by using an exhaust gas deflector along the right side of the hull. Given the increased mass of the BMP-1UM, larger track fairings were used to ensure amphibious performance.

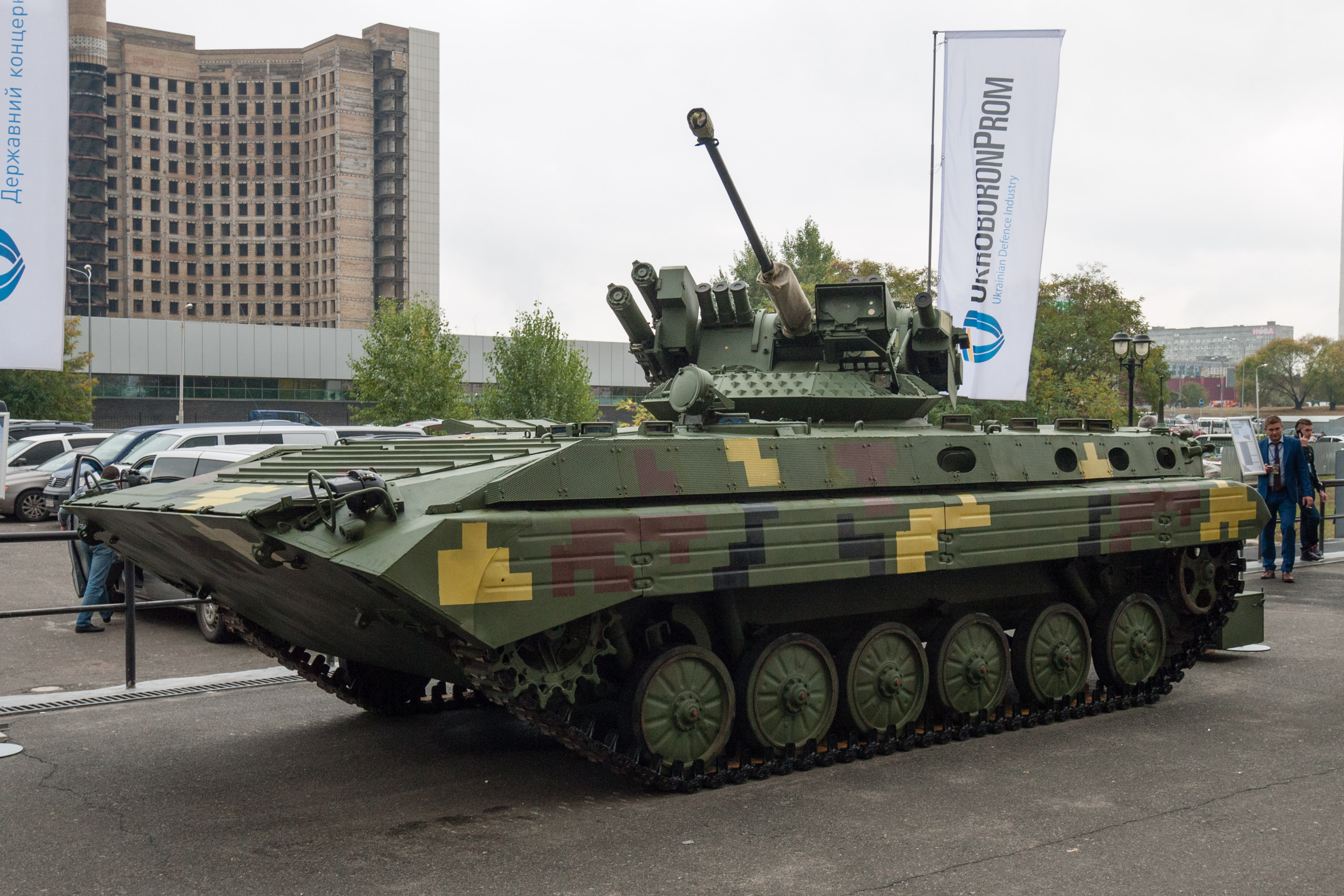
BMP-1UMD with Stylet RWS and Deutz turbodiesel engine.

- BMP-1UMD – A further development of the BMP-1UM from Zhytomyr Armour Plant, unveiled in 2016 at the Arms and Security exhibition. This variant has a new RWS and engine; powered by an electronically controlled Deutz TCD2013 L64V 6-cylinder turbodiesel which produces 330 hp and is more reliable, quieter and efficient than both the UTD-20 and 3TD-2. This engine is also used in Ukraine's BTR-4 wheeled APCs. The Shkval-A was replaced by a new Stylet RWS (often called a "module" in Ukrainian sources) with a fully digital fire-control system, a brand-new sight system known as Trek-M and SWU-500-3C weapon stabilizer. The primary armament is a 30 mm ZT-2 automatic cannon (Ukrainian-made 2A42 gun), KT-7.62 coaxial MG, 30 mm AG-17 AGS and two Barrier ATGM launchers. ERA bricks were omitted in this version, replaced by extended mesh covers along the upper hull sides. Curiously, the BMP-1UMD project made no changes to the BMP-1's troop compartment, with the original access doors and troop layout. The Ukrainian Ministry of Defence did formally trial vehicles equipped with Shkval and Stylet RWS modules, however their results are not public and no orders were made, hinting at their less than satisfactory performance.
- BMP-1 – Converted into an ARV.

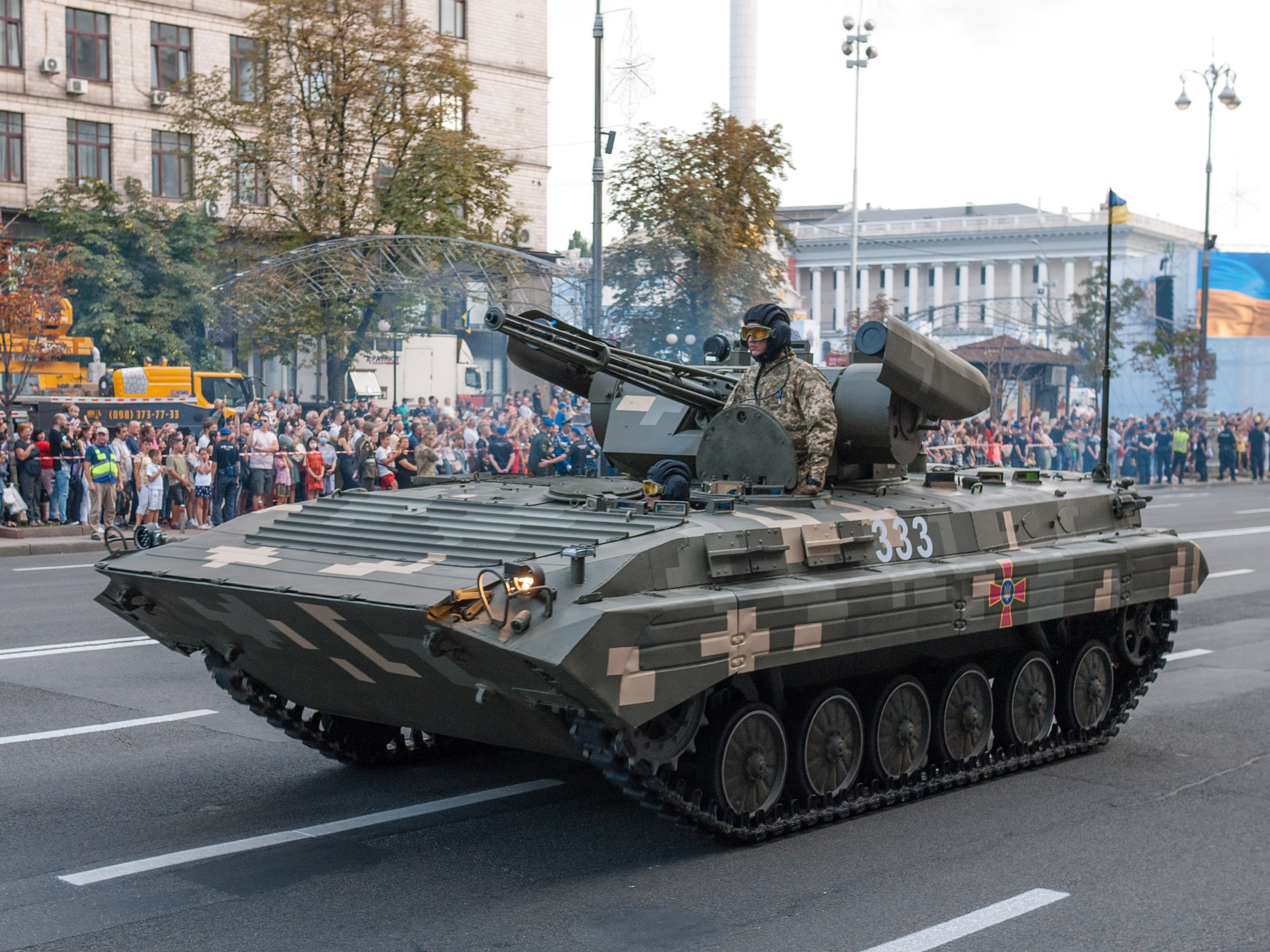
BMP-1TS with the Spys RWS module in Ukrainian service, 2021

- BMP-1TS – Upgrade variant developed by Ukrainian private enterprise; Techimpex have been working on a RWS for the BMP-1 named Spys since 2018. Its armament consists of the usual assortment of on-board weapons: 30 mm ZTM-1 automatic cannon (with 300 rounds of ammunition), KT-7.62 MG (with 350 ready rounds of ammunition and a total of 2,100 rounds carried), a 30 mm KBA-117 AGS (with 116 rounds on board, 29 ready to use) and Barrier ATGM (four missiles carried of which two are ready to launch). The Spys module received the Syntez fire-control system consisting of Kazhan-3K15 sighting complex with both thermal and optical TV cameras as well as a laser rangefinder. Combat effectiveness is enhanced with an electro-mechanical 2-axis weapon stabilization system. The advanced software used in the Spys module allow for automatic target tracking. Its small overall dimensions mean that it is interchangeable with the original BMP-1 turret with no modifications required. The upgrade package does not include any changes to the chassis or automotive qualities of the BMP-1, and the only other addition is a Motorola DM4601 radio. Further mine and ballistic protection are only available as options. ten vehicles were ordered by the Ukrainian defence ministry and unveiled at the 2021 Independence Day parade. At least one vehicle belonging to the 53rd Mechanized Brigade was lost in the city of Volnovakha in March during the 2022 Russian invasion of Ukraine.

== See also ==
- List of modern armoured fighting vehicles
