= BTR-60 =

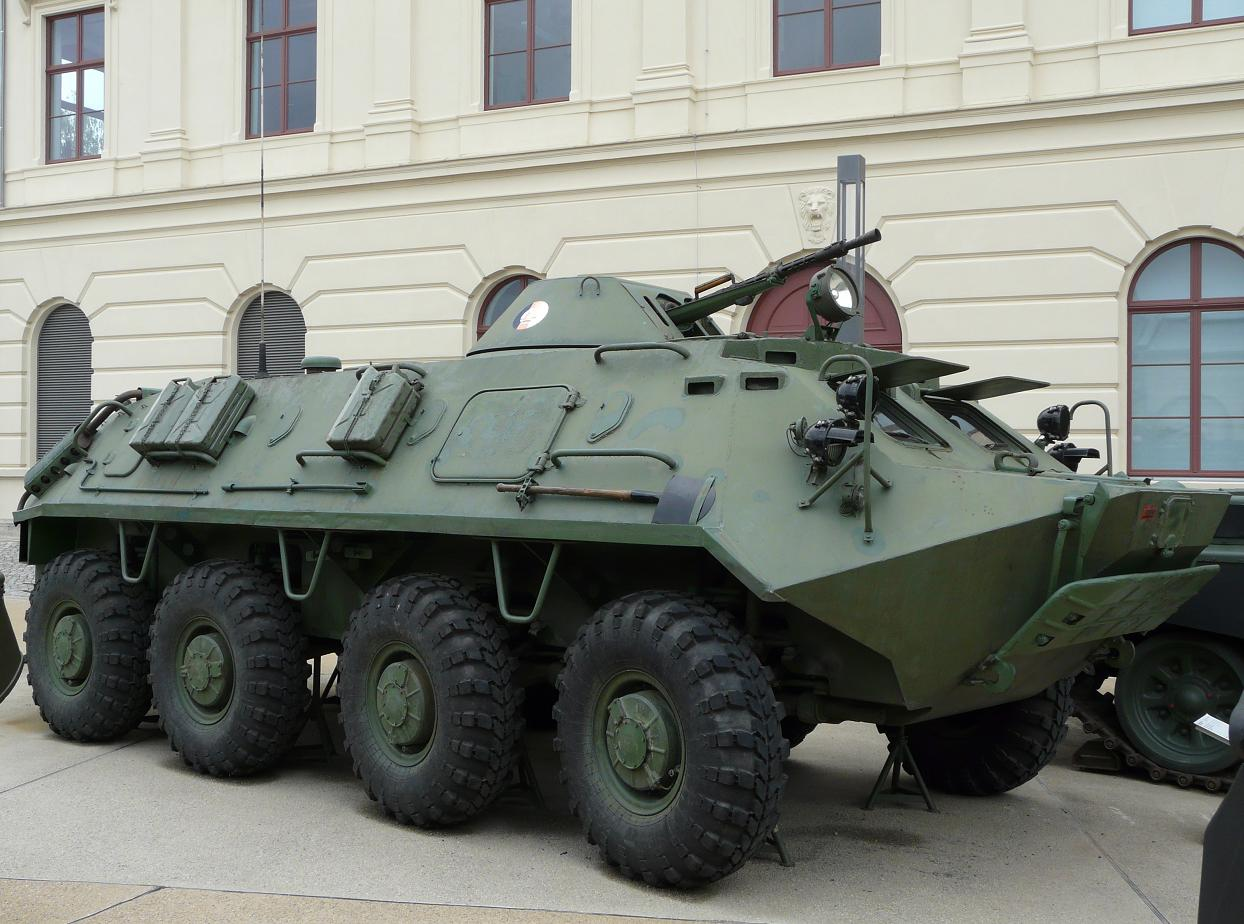
- A BTR-60PB
- Type: Wheeled amphibious armoured personnel carrier
- Place of origin: Soviet Union

Service history
- In service: 1959–present
- Used by: See Operators
- Wars: See List of conflicts

Production history
- Designer: V. A. Dedkov
- Designed: 1955
- Manufacturer: Gorkovsky Avtomobilny Zavod (Soviet Union); Regia Autonomă Pentru Producția De Tehnică Militară (Romania, TAB-71)
- Produced: 1960–1976 (Soviet Union); 1970-1990 (Romania)
- No. built: ~25,000 (Soviet Union); 1,878 (Romania, TAB-71)
- Variants: See Variants

Specifications (BTR-60PB)
- Mass: 10.3 t (11.4 short tons)
- Length: 7.56 metres (24 ft 9 1/2 in)
- Width: 2.825 m (9 ft 3 in)
- Height: 2.31 m (7 ft 7 in) (Note: 2.055 metres (6 ft 9 in) from the bottom to the top of the hull. (Foss 1990, p. 434))
- Crew: 3 crew + 14 passengers (Note: Maximum capacity is 14 passengers, while 8 were normally carried. (Foss 1990, p. 434))
- Armor: Welded steel 5−9 mm at hull 7 mm at turret
- Main armament: 14.5 mm KPVT heavy machine gun (500 rounds) (Note: The BTR-60P and BTR-60PA main armament is a 7.62 mm SGM or PKB machine gun with 2,000 rounds, although Foss notes that some vehicles were seen with a 12.7 mm DShK machine gun instead. (Foss 1990, p. 432))
- Secondary armament: 7.62 mm PKT coaxial machine gun (3,000 rounds)
- Engine: 2×GAZ-49B 6-cylinder water-cooled gasoline 67 kW (90 hp) each 134 kW (180 hp) (combined)
- Power/weight: 13.03 kW/t (17.47 hp/t)
- Suspension: Torsion bar with hydraulic shock absorbers
- Ground clearance: 475 mm (18 11/16 in)
- Fuel capacity: 290 L (77 US gal)
- Operational range: 500 km (300 mi)
- Maximum speed: 80 km/h (50 mph) on road 10 km/h (6 mph) in water

The BTR-60 is the first vehicle in a series of Soviet eight-wheeled armoured personnel carriers (APCs). It was developed in the late 1950s as a replacement for the BTR-152 and was seen in public for the first time in 1961. BTR stands for bronetransportyor (Russian: бронетранспортёр, БТР, lit. 'armoured carrier').

== History ==
=== Origins ===
The BTR-152 and BTR-40, the first two Soviet mass-produced APCs developed after the Second World War, gave the Soviet Army useful experience with wheeled armoured personnel carriers. However, even as they were designed, they were not suited for the needs of the Soviet Army as they lacked a roof (which was added in later versions designated BTR-152K and BTR-40B respectively). The low combat values of the BTR-152 and BTR-40 were exposed when the Egyptian Army used them during the Suez Crisis and also when the Soviet Army used them in the fighting on the streets of Budapest during the Hungarian Revolution of 1956. These were among the reasons why the new APC was developed.

Between 1956 and 1957, a decision was made to convert all rifle and mechanized divisions into motor rifle divisions and a requirement for a new transport vehicle was drawn up.

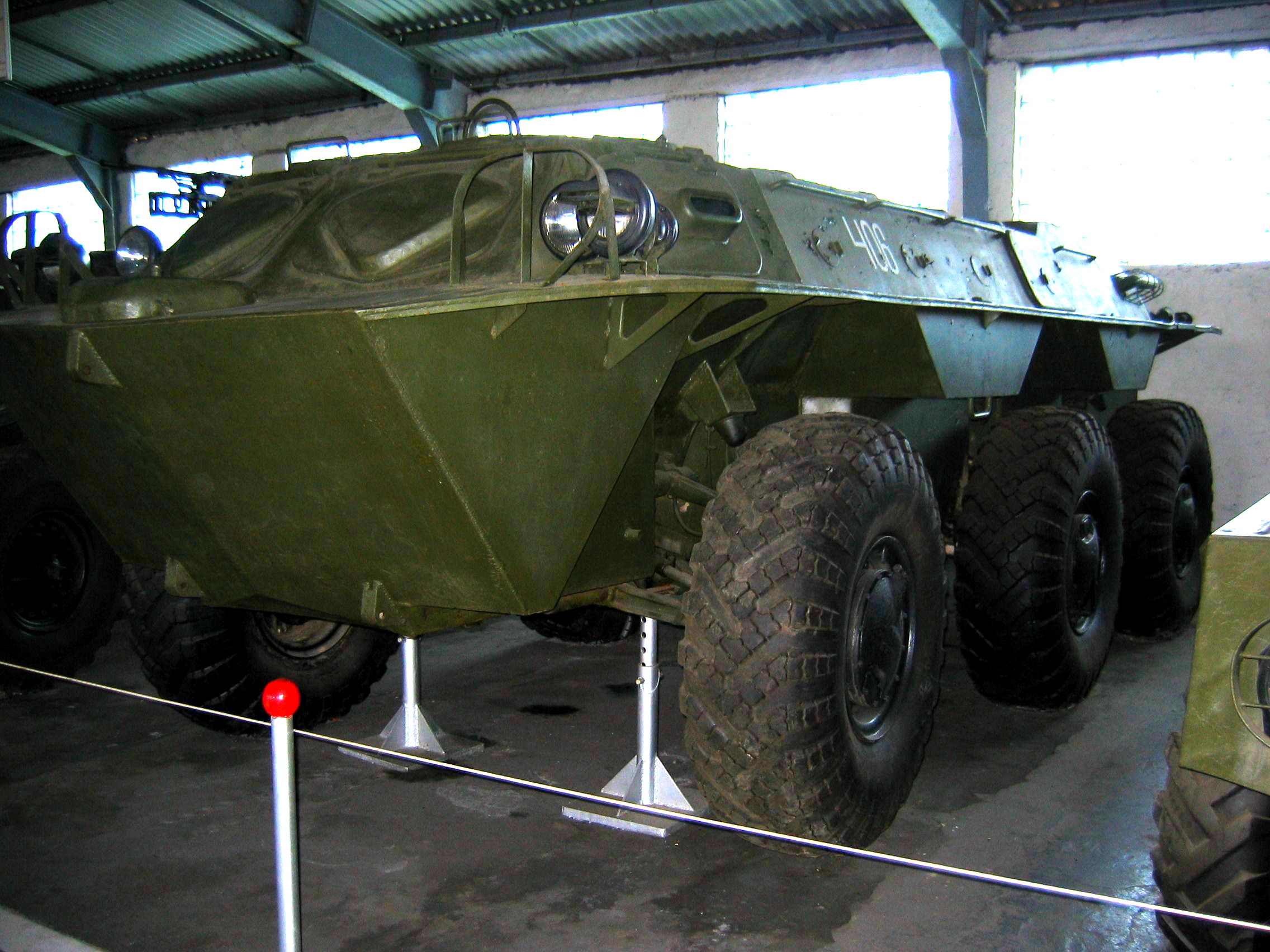
ZIL-153 at the Kubinka Tank Museum.

Development proceeded along two paths: a more expensive vehicle that would eventually become the BMP-1, for use in tank divisions, and a cheaper vehicle for use in motor rifle divisions, that would eventually become the BTR-60. Two design bureaus were given the requirements, GAZ led by V. A. Dedkov, and ZIL led by Rodionov and Orlov. The requirements stated that the vehicle should have all wheel drive, at least two turnable axles, independent suspension as well as mobility and fording capabilities allowing it to operate alongside tanks. The vehicle was also supposed to be amphibious. The GAZ design team started to work on the new APC during the winter of 1956. Despite the fact that the army wanted a fully roofed vehicle with NBC protection system, the GAZ design did not have those features. It was argued that firing from the cramped interior would be difficult and that the limitation of losses was not a priority. The prototype was built between 1957 and 1958. ZIL developed a 6x6 design, the ZIL-153, similar in hull shape to the GAZ design. There were also three other 8x8 prototypes: Ob'yekt 560 (also known as MMZ-560), Ob'yekt 1015 (developed by KAZ), Ob'yekt 1015B (developed by KAZ, it had with a turret-mounted armament and stream propellers, also known as BTR-1015B) and Ob'yekt 1020B (developed by KAZ). All prototypes were submitted to and passed state trials in 1959. Even though the Ob'yekt 1015B performed best, the GAZ design was selected and given the designation BTR-60P. Officially, the committee that made the decision did so because of the GAZ plant's production capabilities and experience. The main reason was that the GAZ design was the simplest and cheapest one and introduced the fewest technological advancements, which made it easier to put into mass production.

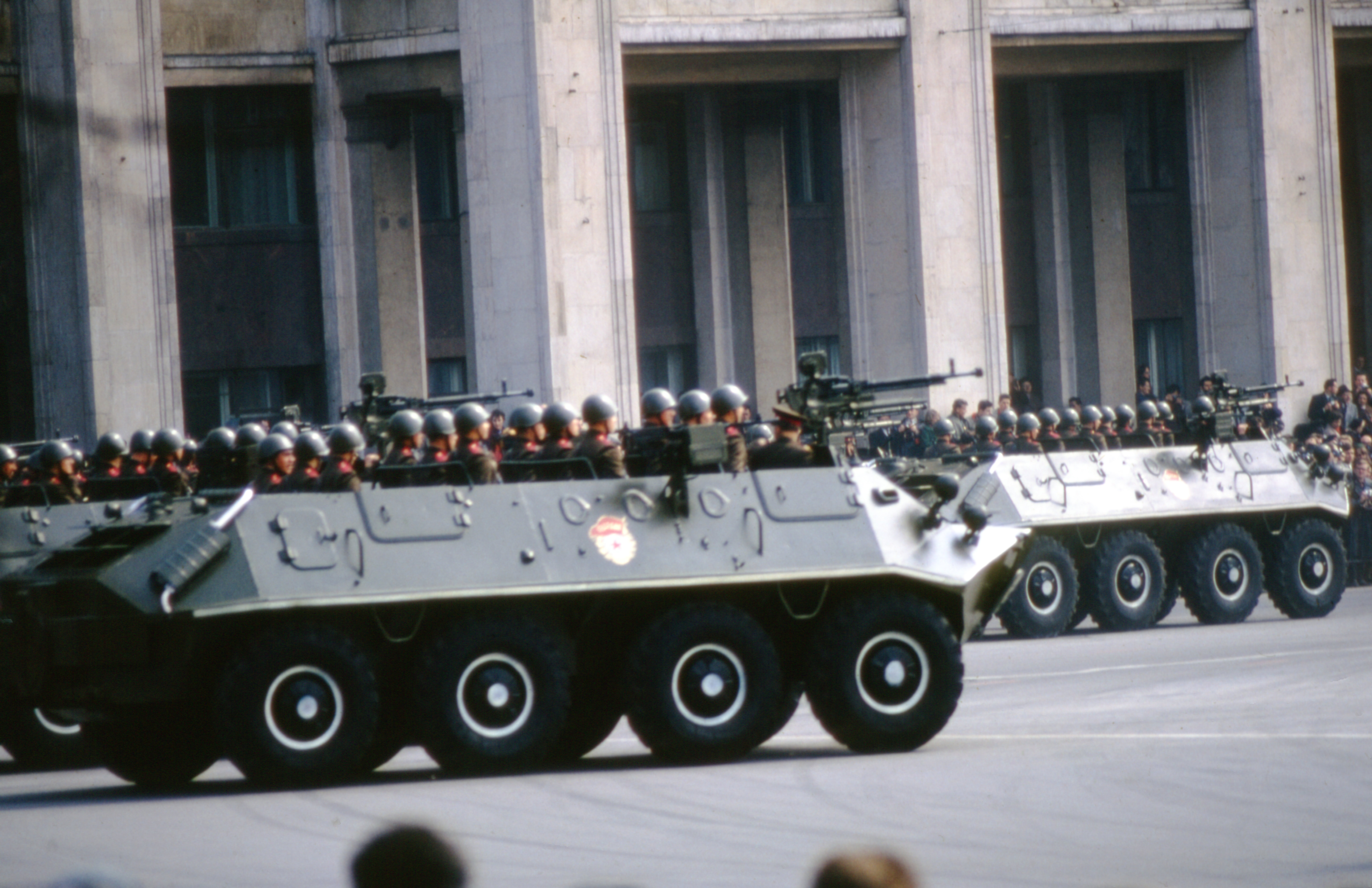
BTR-60P during 1964 Moscow May 1st Parade.

BTR-60P had open-roofed crew and troop compartments, which was deemed to be a serious disadvantage. Accordingly, a new version with an armoured roof, designated BTR-60PA, entered production in 1963. This new version's capacity was reduced from 16 soldiers to 14 soldiers.

The appearance of the German HS.30 APC, which was armed with a 20 mm cannon, prompted the addition of the conical BPU-1 turret. This turret, which was originally developed for the BRDM-2 amphibious armoured scout car, was armed with the KPVT 14.5 mm heavy machine gun and a PKT 7.62 mm tank machine gun. The new vehicle was designated the BTR-60PAI and entered production in 1965. It was, however, quickly replaced by the BTR-60PB, which had a better sighting system for the machine guns.

== Description ==
BTR-60 was a revolutionary design for its time. It had a non-standard layout for an APC; the crew compartment was in the front, the troop compartment in the middle and the engine compartment in the rear. This meant that, while the BTR-60 did not share some of the weaknesses that other APCs had, it had several disadvantages of its own.

=== Crew ===
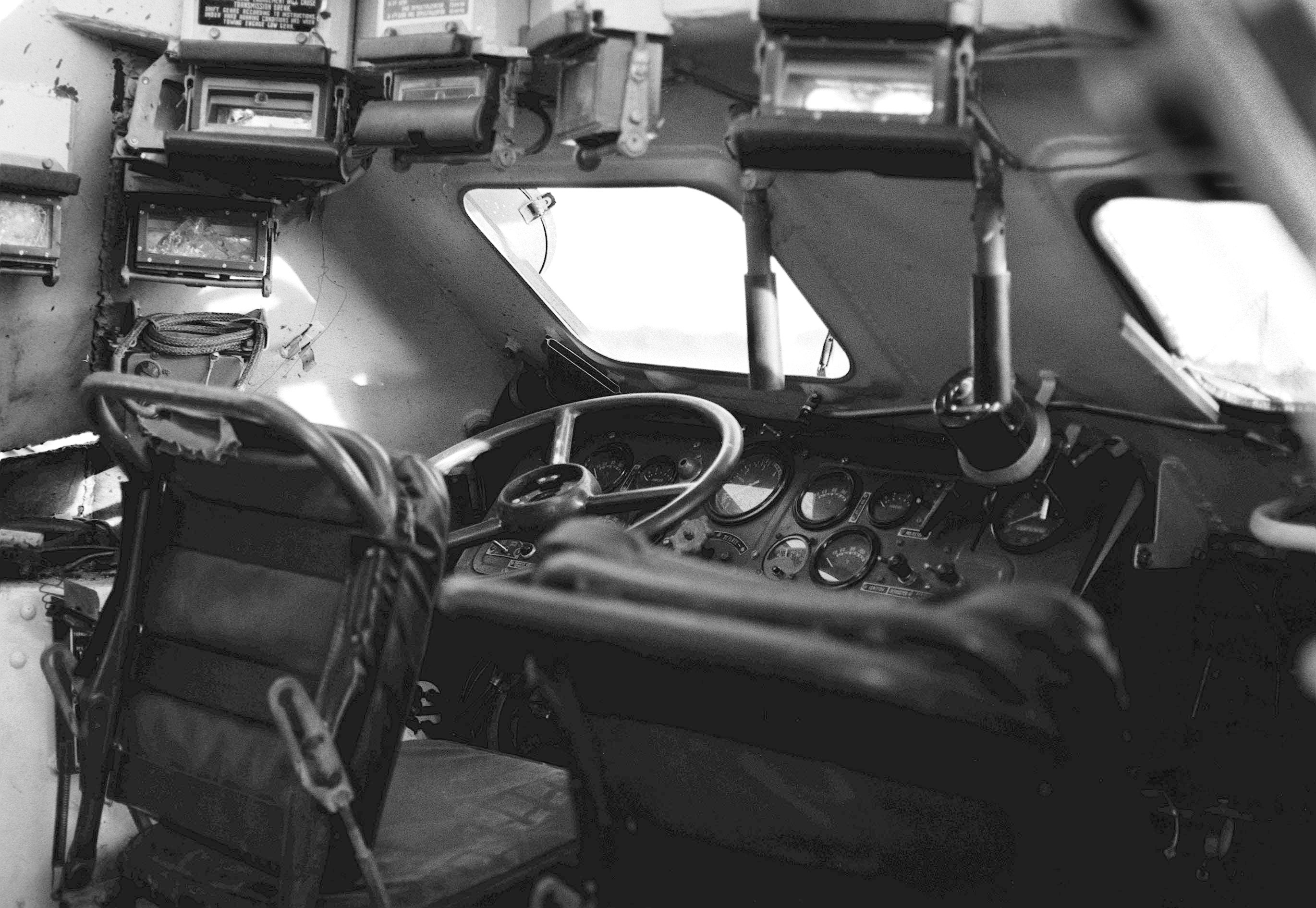
The driver's station.

BTR-60P crew: 1)-commander; 2)-driver; 4)- 14× infantry soldiers

BTR-60PB crew: 1)-commander; 2)-driver; 3)-gunner; 4)- 7× infantry soldiers

In the BTR-60, the crew compartment is located in the front of the vehicle and had a roof – unlike the troop compartment, which first received one with the introduction of the BTR-60PA. In the BTR-60P and BTR-60PA, the crew consists of a driver and a commander. The driver's seat is on the left and commander's seat is on the right. In the BTR-60PAI, BTR-60PB and BTR-60PZ, the crew consists of a driver, a commander and a gunner. The position of the driver and commander stations remained unchanged in later models. The gunner operates the BPU-1 turret, using the PP-61A optical sight. In the BTR-60P, both the driver and commander manned their positions by entering the vehicle through the sides. The BTR-60PA introduced two hatches over their stations and crew members had to climb on top of the vehicle to use them. The entry method did not change in later production models. The BTR-60B introduced a side door for the gunner on the right side, and firing ports for both the driver and commander, and two for the gunner, one on each side. (For more information on the BTR-60's firing port see the troop compartment section). Both the driver and the commander have forward views through bulletproof windshields, onto which steel covers can be lowered. In the BTR-60P and BTR-60PA, the covers had vision slots, and additional slots on both sides of the crew compartment. These were removed in the BTR-60PB in favor of two periscopes on each side. In early models of the BTR-60P and BTR-60PA, only the driver had a periscope, while the commander had a removable OU-3 infrared searchlight. In the BTR-60PB, both the driver and the commander have three periscopes in the front (the commander's center periscope can be hard to see as it's just below the OU-3 infrared light). The vehicle was usually equipped with an R-113 radio; however, some models used the R-123. The initial BTR-60P production model lacked night-vision and had only four headlights (two infrared, two white, one of each kind per side, these remained in all BTR-60 models). Late BTR-60P models were fitted with night-vision; the TKN-1 connected with the OU-3 infrared searchlight for the commander and the TWN-2 for the driver. This remained unchanged in later models.

=== Troop compartment ===
The troop compartment is behind the crew compartment and in front of the engine compartment. The BTR-60P can transport up to 16 fully equipped soldiers. This number reduced to 14 in BTR-60PB. As the BTR-60P did not have a roof, it was covered with a tarpaulin when traveling in bad weather conditions. It was also covered with bows and canvas. Also, all BTR-60 models had three firing ports on each upper side of the hull through which the infantry being transported could fire at the enemy with their personal weapons. The difference between models was in the position of these three firing ports. The BTR-60P and BTR-60PA had the firing ports positioned in a row between the middle and the front part of the troop compartment. In the BTR-60PB, the firing ports were relocated; one was next to the driver and commander, one next to the gunner and one in the side of the troop compartment.

Because of the engine placement (in the rear of the vehicle), transported infantry must mount and dismount through the sides in the BTR-60P or through the roof hatches in the roofed BTR-60PA, BTR-60PB, and BTR-60PZ variants. To help the infantry to mount and dismount the vehicle, the BTR-60P had two steps on each side of the hull, one between the first and second pair of road wheels and the other between the third and fourth pair of wheels. It also had two vertical hand rails on each side of the troop compartment, as well as an angled horizontal one on the left-hand side of the hull next to the engine compartment. The BTR-60PA introduced yet another step on each side of the hull between the second and third pair of wheels, as well as six horizontal hand rails on each side of the vehicle, three on the lower side and three on the upper side. The vertical ones were removed, while yet another angled horizontal one was added on the right-hand side of the hull next to the engine compartment. In the BTR-60PB, the number of hand rails decreased from six to five on each side of the hull; the rear upper hand rail was removed from the right side, whereas the center upper one was removed from the left side. The BTR-60P has two doors on each side of the troop compartment (one in the front and one in the rear), but infantry still had to dismount through the sides. The side doors were removed in the BTR-60PA. They were used mostly as emergency exits and as auxiliary firing ports. In the BTR-60PB, a side door was added on the front left of the troop compartment.

=== Protection ===
The hull armour is made from welded steel and provides protection against small arms fire and shrapnel. The frontal armour can withstand 7.62 mm bullets from any range. The rest of the armour can withstand 7.62 mm bullets from a range of 100 m.

The BTR-60P did not have a roof over the troop compartment, which made a weakness that could easily be exploited—even the simplest explosives could take out a BTR-60P. The new BTR design with a roof was called the BTR-60PA.

Armour thickness is as follows:

Hull:

- Upper front: 7 mm at 86°
- Lower front: 9 mm at 47°
- Sides: 7 mm
- Upper rear: 5 mm at 65°
- Lower rear: 7 mm at 0°
- Floor: 5 mm
- Roof: 7 mm (Since BTR-60PA)

Turret (BTR-60PB):

- Front: 7 mm
- Sides: 7 mm
- Rear: 7 mm
- Roof: 7 mm

=== Maneuverability ===
The BTR-60 has an 8x8 suspension. Originally, there were difficulties in finding a suitable engine for it: the six-cylinder GAZ-40P gasoline engine, which produces 90 hp, had insufficient power, while the 205-hp YaAZ-206B was too heavy. Instead, the BTR was fitted with two six-cylinder gasoline GAZ-49B engines (90 hp) located side by side in the rear of the vehicle. This engine was essentially almost identical to the one used in the smaller BTR-40, derived from the GAZ-63 truck. The combined power of the engines is 180 hp (134 kW). Each engine propels two of the vehicle's axles. The engine on the right propels the second and the fourth axles, while the one on the left propels the first and the third axles. Each engine has its own four-speed gear box with a single-shielded hydraulically controlled clutch and an exhaust. Each axle has its own differential and is hung on transversal torsion bars. The first two axles each have two hydraulic absorbers, while the third and fourth only have one. The first and second pair of wheels can be turned. The gaps between the first and second axles and between the third and fourth axles are even. The gap between the second and third axles is slightly larger than the other ones.

The two-engines setup has an advantage in the fact that each engine could work without the other. This means that if one engine is disabled, it does not affect the other one and the vehicle can still move, albeit with reduced speed. This setup, however, caused several problems that either do not exist in single-engined vehicles or were not as serious: the design itself was complicated and the amount of work that had to be done during maintenance and repair was higher than in vehicles with a single engine. The engines themselves were originally intended for passenger car and light truck use, which meant that they were working in extreme conditions not originally envisioned for them. Because of this, engine breakdowns were frequent. The vehicle also used large amounts of fuel and caught fire easily. Despite all this, the two-engines setup was used in all BTR-60 production models as well as most variants of the BTR-70. The single-engine setup was introduced in the BTR-80.

=== Amphibious capability ===
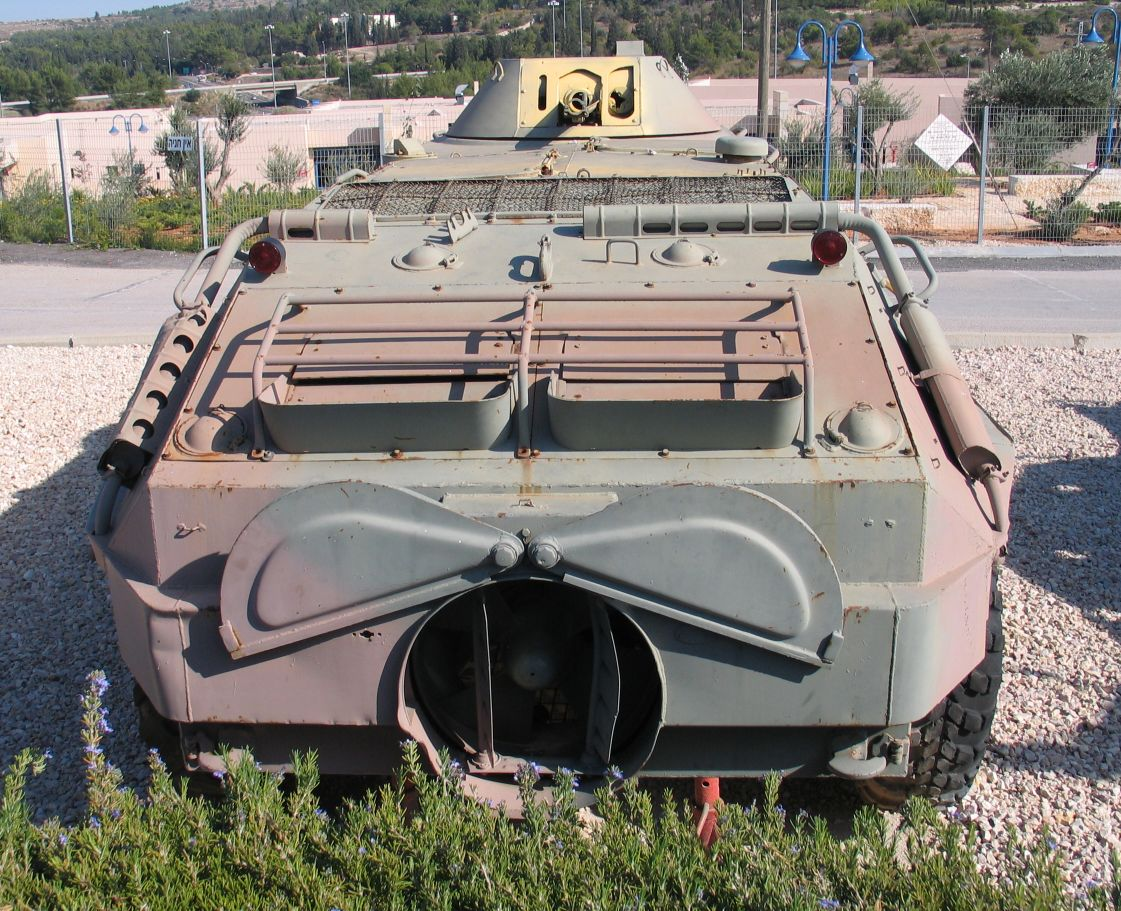
Ex-Egyptian or ex-Syrian BTR-60PB, in the Yad la-Shiryon museum, Israel, 2005. Notice the exposed water jet with both of its lids opened.

The BTR-60 is fully amphibious, propelled in the water by a jet centrally mounted at the rear of the hull. It was, however, prone to breakdowns. When not in use, it is protected by the sideways opening lids. Before entering the water, the trim vane at the front of the hull should be erected to prevent water from flooding over the bow. While in its traveling position, it serves as additional lower frontal armor.

== Production models ==
Characteristics of the BTR-60 production models
| | BTR-60P | early BTR-60PA | BTR-60PA | BTR-60PA-1 | BTR-60PAI | BTR-60PB |
|---|---|---|---|---|---|---|
| Weight (tonnes) | 9.8 | 10.2 | | 10.3 | ? | 10.3 |
| Height (metres) | 2.06 m | | | | 2.31 m | |
| Crew | 2 + 16 | | | | 3 + 14 | |
| Primary armament | 7.62 mm PKT, SGMB or PKB tank/medium/general-purpose machine gun (2,000 rounds) | | 12.7 mm DShK 1938/46 heavy machine gun (500 rounds) | | 14.5 mm KPVT heavy machine gun (500 rounds) | |
| Secondary armament | 2 × 7.62 mm PKT, SGMB or PKB tank/medium/general-purpose machine guns (3,000 rounds) mounted on the sides of the troop compartment (optional) | | | | 7.62 mm PKT coaxial tank machine gun (3,000 rounds) | |
| Power-to-weight ratio hp/tonne (kW/tonne) | 18.4 (13.7) | 17.6 (13.1) | | 17.5 (13.0) | ? | 17.5 (13.0) |

== Production history ==
BTR-60s were produced by Gorkovsky Avtomobilny Zavod (GAZ). The BTR-60P was produced between 1960 and 1963. The BTR-60PA entered production in 1963, followed by the BTR-60PA-1 in 1965. Both the BTR-60PA and BTR-60PA-1 were produced until 1966. The BTR-60PAI also entered production in 1965, but was quickly replaced in 1966 by the BTR-60PB, which had a better sighting system for the machine guns. The BTR-60PB remained in production until 1976, when it was superseded by the BTR-70. According to Western estimates, around 25,000 BTR-60s were produced by GAZ. During BTR-80 production, and therefore after BTR-60 production had ended, there was a special production run of 100 BTR-60PBs, some of which have been exported to Iraq.

== Service history ==
=== Soviet Union ===
An order to enter the BTR-60P into Soviet Army service was issued on 13 December 1959. However, production did not start until 1960. The first BTR-60Ps were delivered in 1960. It first entered service with the Soviet Army and later the Marine Corps. The BTR-60 entered service with the Soviet military at the time when the USSR was arming on a mass scale. In the early 1960s, it replaced the BTR-152 in the role of the basic APC. The BTR-60P was first seen by the West in 1961. The BTR-60PA entered service with the Soviet Army in 1963, the BTR-60PA-1 and BTR-60PAI entered service in 1965, the BTR-60PB in 1966, the BTR-60PZ in 1972 and the BTR-60PBK in 1975. As newer models of the BTR-60 appeared, the older ones were gradually withdrawn from front-line service. A number of old BTR-60Ps were converted into repair vehicles.

The first use of Soviet BTR-60s in an armed conflict happened during the Warsaw Pact 1968 Invasion of Czechoslovakia. However, actual combat was scarce.

In the 1980s, most of the BTR-60s in the Soviet army had been replaced by the BTR-70 and BTR-80; however, a large number was still operated by second-line and border troops. According to the data provided by the USSR during the signing of the CFE Treaty in 1990, there were 4,191 BTR-60s in service with the units stationed in the European part of the Soviet Union.

==== Sino-Soviet border conflict ====
The first real combat use of the BTR-60 took place during the Sino-Soviet border conflict on Zhenbao Island (Damansky Island at the time) in March 1969. The frontier units operating on the island were equipped with BTR-60PBs, while the 57th border detachment group was equipped with BTR-50Ps and BTR-50PKs. The BTR-60 proved to be a worthwhile vehicle, although it sustained high losses due to the large number of RPGs used by the Chinese and mistakes made by the commanders of the APCs stemming from their insufficient combat experience with the new vehicles. The high losses due to RPG hits weren't unexpected, as the BTR-60's armour was designed to protect the vehicle from small arms fire and shrapnel, but not specialized anti-tank weapons. The most effective tactic found for using BTR-60PBs was in covering the dismounted infantry. This is a job more suited for infantry fighting vehicles than armoured personnel carriers, whose main role is transporting infantry to the battlefield and providing them with armour protection during that time. The BMP-1, the world's first mass-produced infantry fighting vehicle, started production in 1966 and therefore the Soviet Army had very small numbers of those vehicles available at the time of Sino-Soviet border conflict. During the fights in March, the Chinese managed to capture four BTR-60PBs and one T-62 MBT.

BTR-60PBs were used again during the border conflict east of Lake Zhalanashkol in Kazakhstan (Kazakh SSR at the time) in August 1969. During the fighting, the armour of BTR-60PB proved inadequate.

==== Soviet–Afghan War ====
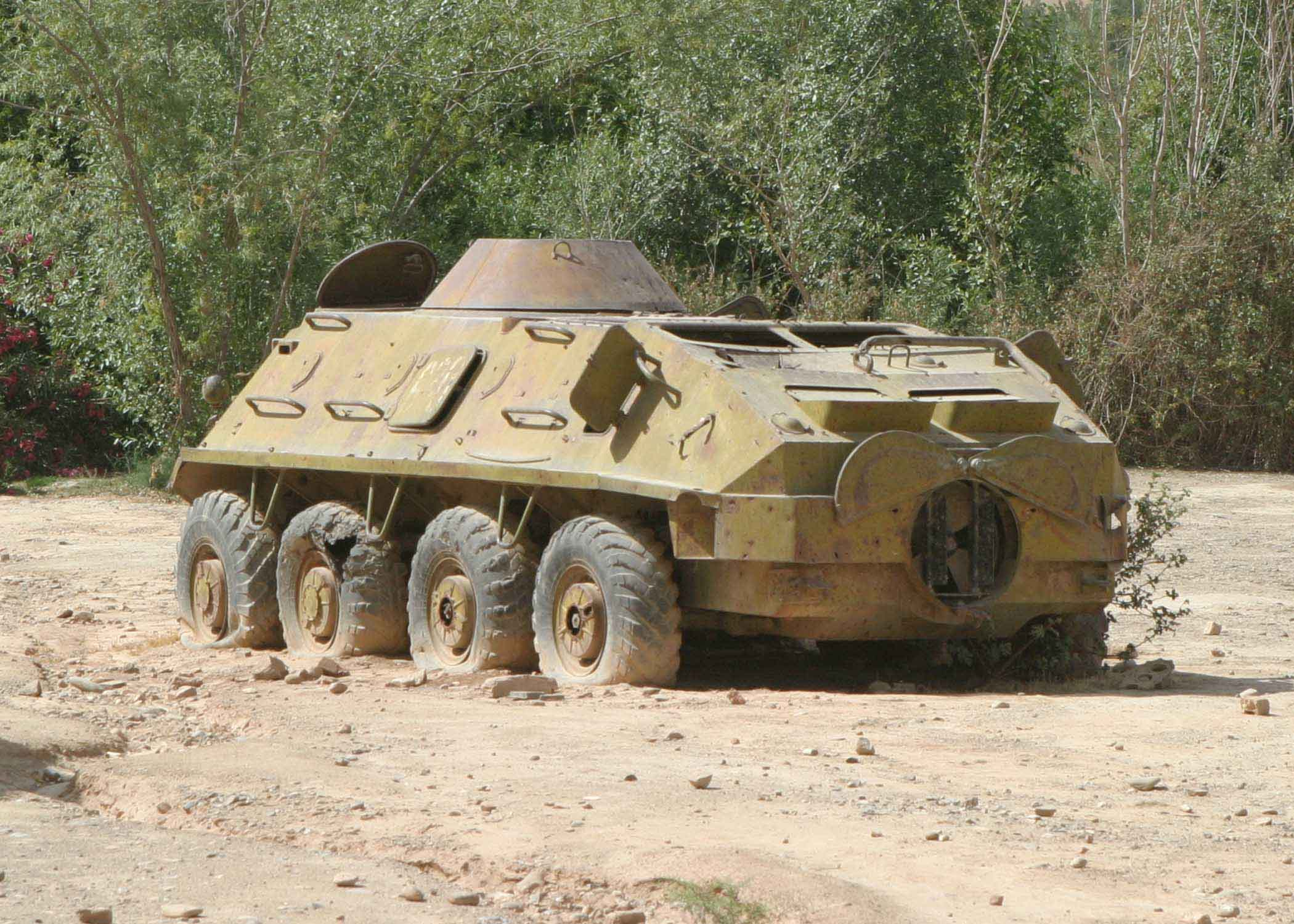
A rusting BTR-60PB abandoned in the center of a village in Afghanistan's Oruzgan province.

The BTR-60PB was used in large numbers during the initial part of the Soviet–Afghan War. This was because the units that were originally used for this operation weren't the top priority of the Soviet military, which prioritized the units stationed in East Germany. The same design flaws were present during this conflict and the vehicle became even more vulnerable due to the kind of fighting that took place in Afghanistan. The GAZ-40P gasoline engines experienced frequent power losses and overheating due to the tropical highland climate for which they were not well suited. Also, the BTR-60PB's turret could not elevate its armament high enough to fire at the Mujahideen attacking from high ground. Like during the Sino-Soviet border conflict, many BTR-60PBs fell victim to RPGs. Because of those drawbacks, the BTR-60PBs were replaced by BTR-70s as soon as possible to a point where only the BTR-60 command variants were used.

==== Other operational use ====
Soviet BTR-60s, BTR-70s and BTR-80s were used for dispersing the demonstrations in Tbilisi in 1989 and stopping the fighting on the border between Uzbek SSR and Kirghiz SSR. They were also used in Nagorno-Karabakh and South Ossetia. In 1990, they were used in Vilnius to suppress the Lithuanian independence movements.

==== Soviet Union successor states ====
In 1991, the BTR-60s of the Soviet Army was passed on to the armies of the successor states and thus used in many regional conflicts. 27 BTR-60PBs that were inherited by Moldavia were used by its army during the War of Transnistria. A number of BTR-60s were used by the Georgian army during the 1992–1993 War in Abkhazia.

As of 2007, several hundred BTR-60s remain in service with USSR successor states; these are in a process of being replaced by more modern vehicles.

===== Russia =====
The Russian Army deployed the BTR-60PB during the First Chechen War, but shortly thereafter retired the vehicle type from army service. Since the mid-1990s, nearly all BTR-60s remaining in Russia's active inventory have been operated by the Border Service. One exception is the BTR-60PU, which has been retained as a command vehicle in the Russian NBC Protection Troops. During the late 2000s, the Russian BTR-60PUs were all refurbished and upgraded with new engines adapted from the BTR-80 series, receiving the designation BTR-60PUM. Some of these BTR-60PUMs were deployed in the Chernobyl Exclusion Zone during the 2022 Russian invasion of Ukraine, with at least one being captured, 1 damaged, and 1 destroyed by the Ukrainian Armed Forces.

===== Moldova =====
Moldova inherited 27 BTR-60PBs from the Soviet Union. They were used during the War of Transnistria against the Pridnestrovian Moldavian Republic. Moldova also ordered 161 ex-Romanian TAB-71Ms in 1992, which were delivered between 1992 and 1995. Moldova also inherited 20 BTR-70s from the Soviet Union and received 250 TAB Zimbrus and MLI-84s from Romania. In the end of March 1992, the Moldavian army was trying to sever the connection between Tiraspol and Rîbnița. Five out of the six BTRs used during that operation were lost. On 1 April, two BTRs were used during the assault on Bender. In June, dozen of APCs were used during another assault on the city.

===== Georgia =====
In 1992, the separatist state of Abkhazia declared Independence from Georgia and the War in Abkhazia (1992–1993) began. Georgia sent its troops to Abkhazia to stabilize the region. The 3,000-man force was poorly equipped with military vehicles, having only five T-55 main battle tanks, a few BMP-2 infantry fighting vehicles, three BTR-60/70 armoured personnel carriers and a small number of BM-21 Grad MRLs. As the war continued, the Georgian forces in Abkhazia were strengthened. The rebels had no AFVs of their own, but captured some heavy equipment from the Georgians. BTR-60 was also used by Ossetian rebels during 1991–1992 South Ossetia War, in one case Ossetian rebels supported by BTR-60PB launched an attack on Georgian Checkpoint, BTR was heavily damaged by 30mm Rounds fired by Georgian BMP-2 and was forced to retreat, following BTR-60 was found by Georgian forces in several days after attack, it was repaired and used by Georgian National Guard.

===== Armenia =====
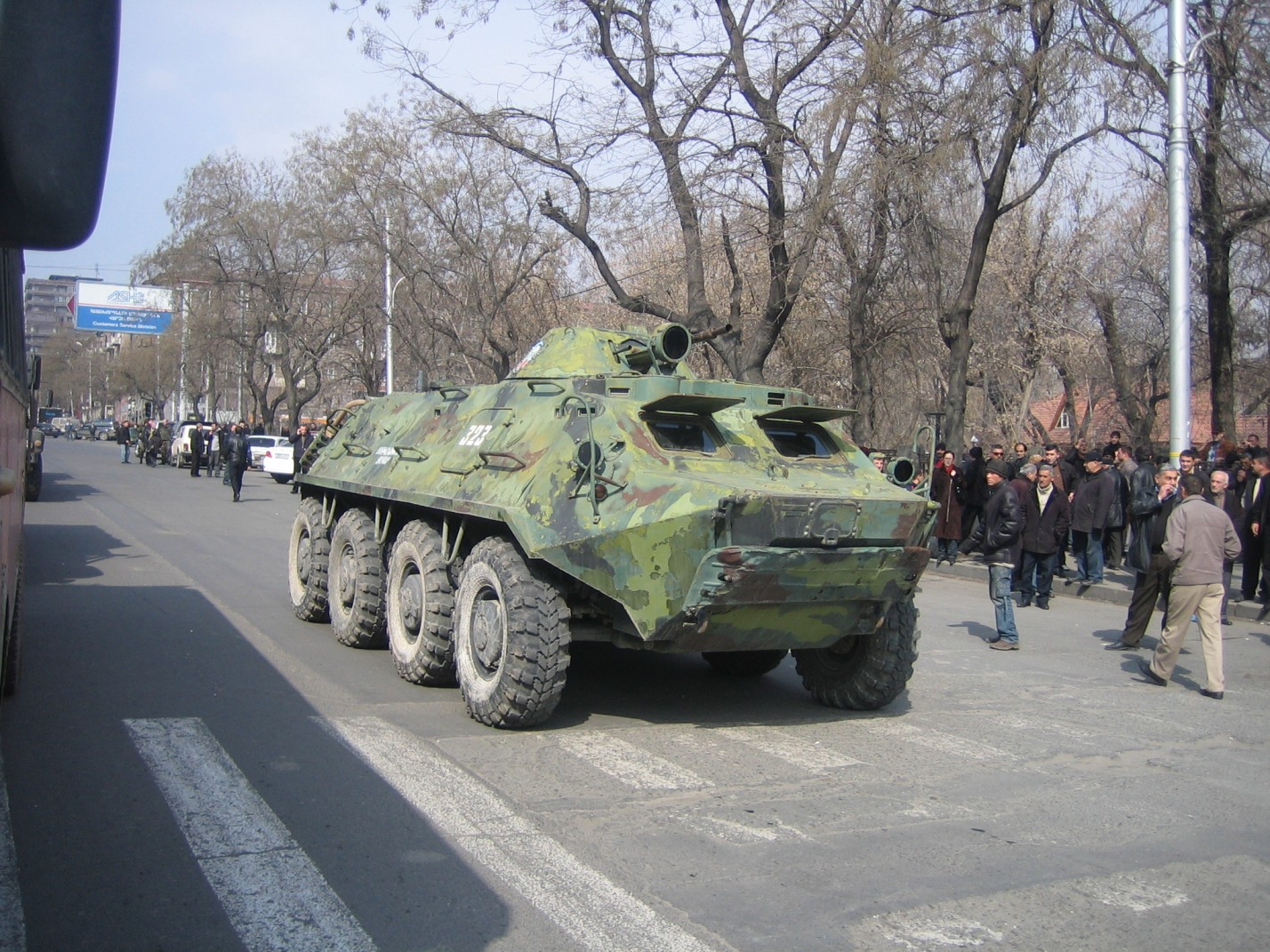
BTR-60PB of the Armenian police enters Shahumyan Square near the French Embassy in Yerevan, Armenia 2008.

A BTR-60PB of the Armenian police was used on 1 March 2008 during the Armenian presidential election protests in Yerevan. It was sent to counter the protest at the Shahumyan Square near the French Embassy, where it arrived at 1:30 pm. Eventually, the unarmed and peaceful demonstrators surrounded the APC, mounted it, and forced its crew to leave the square.

===== Ukraine =====
During the ongoing Russo-Ukrainian War, the Armed Forces of Ukraine used several BTR-60 variants. The Ukrainian National Guard, have deployed BTR-60PBs for counterinsurgency operations in Eastern Ukraine. As of May 9, 2025, 3 BTR-60s in service with the AFU as air defense command vehicles have been visually confirmed as destroyed during the Russian invasion of Ukraine.

An unknown number have been converted into unmanned ground vehicles. The first instance of use was reported in September 2026 when a BTR-60PB converted to a kamikaze drone was used to break through Russian defences in Nove during the 2026 Ukrainian counteroffensive.

=== Foreign service ===
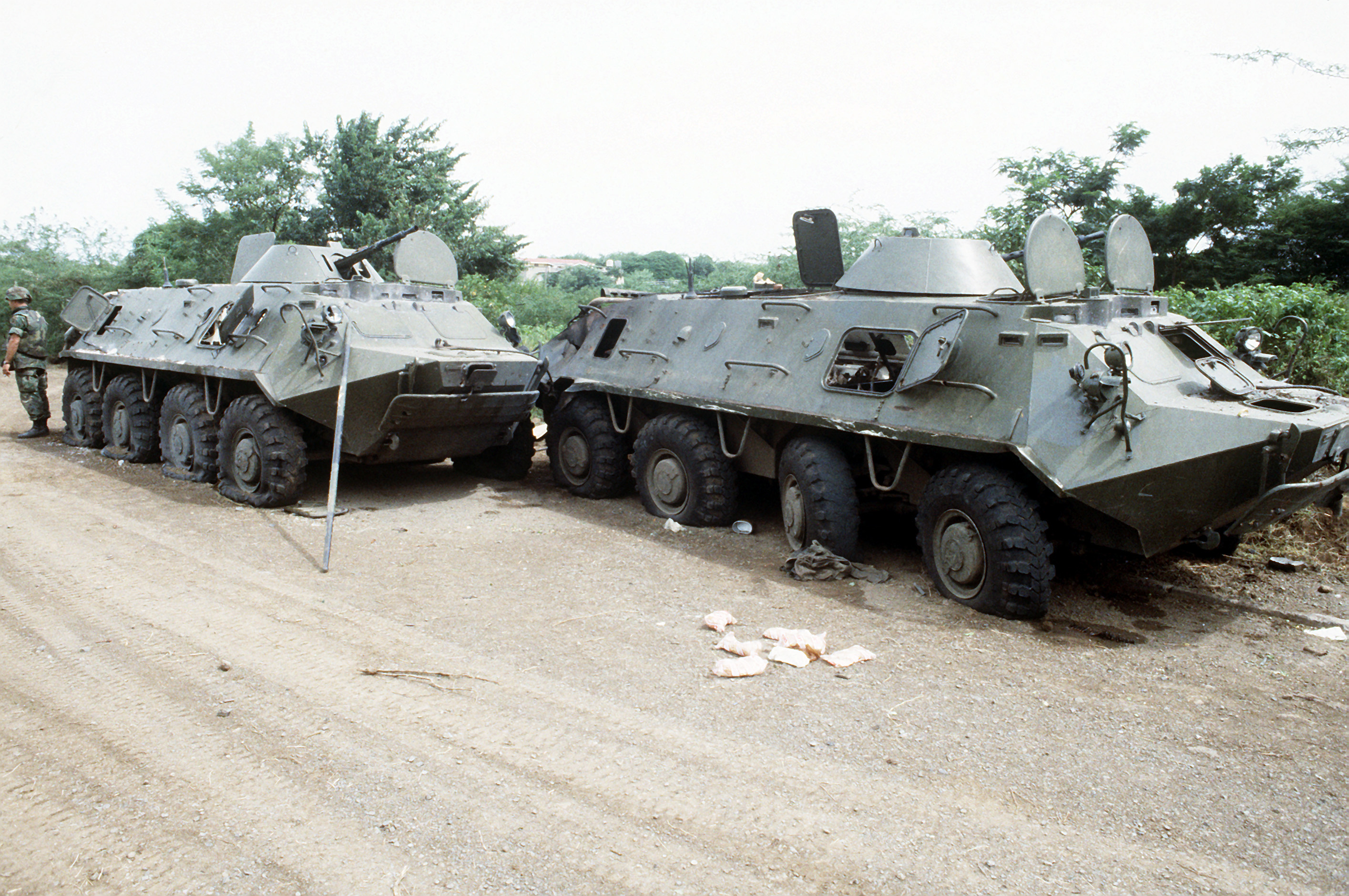
BTR-60s in Grenada

BTR-60 APCs were employed widely both by the Soviet Army and by more than 30 export customers. Operators of the BTR-60 have included Afghanistan, Algeria, Angola, Bhutan, Botswana, Bulgaria, Cambodia, Congo, Cuba, Djibouti, East Germany, Ethiopia, Finland, Grenada, Guinea, Guinea-Bissau, Hungary, India, Iran, Iraq, Laos, Libya, Mali, Mongolia, Mexico, Morocco, Mozambique, Nicaragua, North Korea, Romania, Soviet Union, Syria, Uganda, Vietnam, Yugoslavia, Yemen, and Zambia, as well as many of the successor states of the Soviet Union. The most widely spread model is the BTR-60PB.

Although the BTR-60 still remains in service with many of the world's armies, it is almost never used as an APC any more. They are still being used as mobile command posts, artillery forward observation posts, airplane guidance posts, communication posts and many other specialized roles.

The BTR-60 has seen action in the Yom Kippur War, the 1971 War between India and Pakistan (where it was used very effectively to punch a hole through to Jessore and subsequently Khulna), the Soviet invasion of Afghanistan (where it was used by both the Soviet and Afghan government troops), the Chechen and Yugoslav wars. It was also used by Warsaw Pact forces during the 1968 Warsaw Pact invasion of Czechoslovakia.

==== Angola ====
The Soviet Union invested heavily in bolstering the mechanized and armoured capabilities of the People's Armed Forces of Liberation of Angola (FAPLA) during the Angolan Civil War. To that end, it provided FAPLA with just under 500 BTR-60s as part of a comprehensive military assistance programme between 1975 and 1989. FAPLA initially received 74 BTR-60PBs in 1975, and ordered another 175 BTR-60PBs in 1980, which were delivered between 1981 and 1985. In 1987 and 1988, Angolan motorized brigades received another 250 BTR-60PBs and some BTR-60R-145BM command vehicles.

For most of the 1970s, FAPLA remained critically short of modern armoured vehicles, and as late as 1981 many of its motorized infantry formations were equipped only with trucks or obsolete BTR-152s. By the late 1980s, however, the BTR-60 had largely superseded the BTR-152 in FAPLA service and was being deployed frequently during the civil war. FAPLA's motorized brigades, which bore the brunt of South African counter-insurgency as well as conventional army operations, came to include three companies of BTR-60s each. Additionally, both the Cuban and Soviet military missions in Angola possessed a number of BTR-60s, which were used for general liaison purposes.

A number of FAPLA BTR-60PBs were deployed during the Battle of Cuito Cuanavale, with 65 being lost during several engagements with South African expeditionary forces. FAPLA was not successful in coordinating its combined arms operations over the course of the campaign, and on several occasions the Angolan motorized infantry became separated from their accompanying armour or advanced with no accompanying armour at all, allowing the much more lightly armed South African troops to isolate and destroy them. The first armour-to-armour kill of the battle occurred on 9 September 1987, when a lone BTR-60 carrying out reconnaissance on the Lomba River was knocked out by a South African Ratel infantry fighting vehicle.

Over the course of the civil war, FAPLA BTR-60PBs were commonly used for convoy escort purposes, guarding logistical vehicles bringing fresh supplies and ammunition to the front lines. In this role they were used to repel counter-insurgent ambushes, with some success. Due to prevalence of land mines on Angolan roads, the BTRs always traveled behind a bulldozer or a tank equipped for mine clearance. During the late 1980s, the threat of ambush by South African troops with armoured vehicles and heavy weapons of their own prompted the BTR-60 to be complemented in this role by the much more heavily armed BMP-1.

==== Finland ====
Finland's Jäger battalions operated Soviet-built BTR-60R-145BM "Chaika" vehicles. These were upgraded to BTR-60PUM standard between 1996 and 1997.

In 1991, seven conscripts of the Karelia Brigade drowned when their BTR-60 sank when crossing Lake Saimaa at Taipalsaari during an amphibious exercise, in the country's deadliest peacetime military incident. The contributing factors included technical shortcomings of the vehicle design, incorrect and possibly excessive loading, incorrect setting of an engine valve which caused the engine to overheat, air vents on top of the vehicle which had to be kept open due to the overheating, and the vehicle taking onboard water which went undetected because it accumulated underneath the raised flooring. These factors caused the vehicle to first swim deeper than normal, gradually taking in more water, until a critical point was reached when water rushed in through the open air vents, and the vehicle sank in a matter of seconds. The crew and passengers inside the vehicle had no chance of escaping.

The usual nicknames for BTR-60 amongst the Finnish conscripts were Petteri (a male name), after the initials BTR, and Taipalsaaren sukellusvene (lit. Taipalsaari submarine) after the 1991 incident.

==== Poland ====
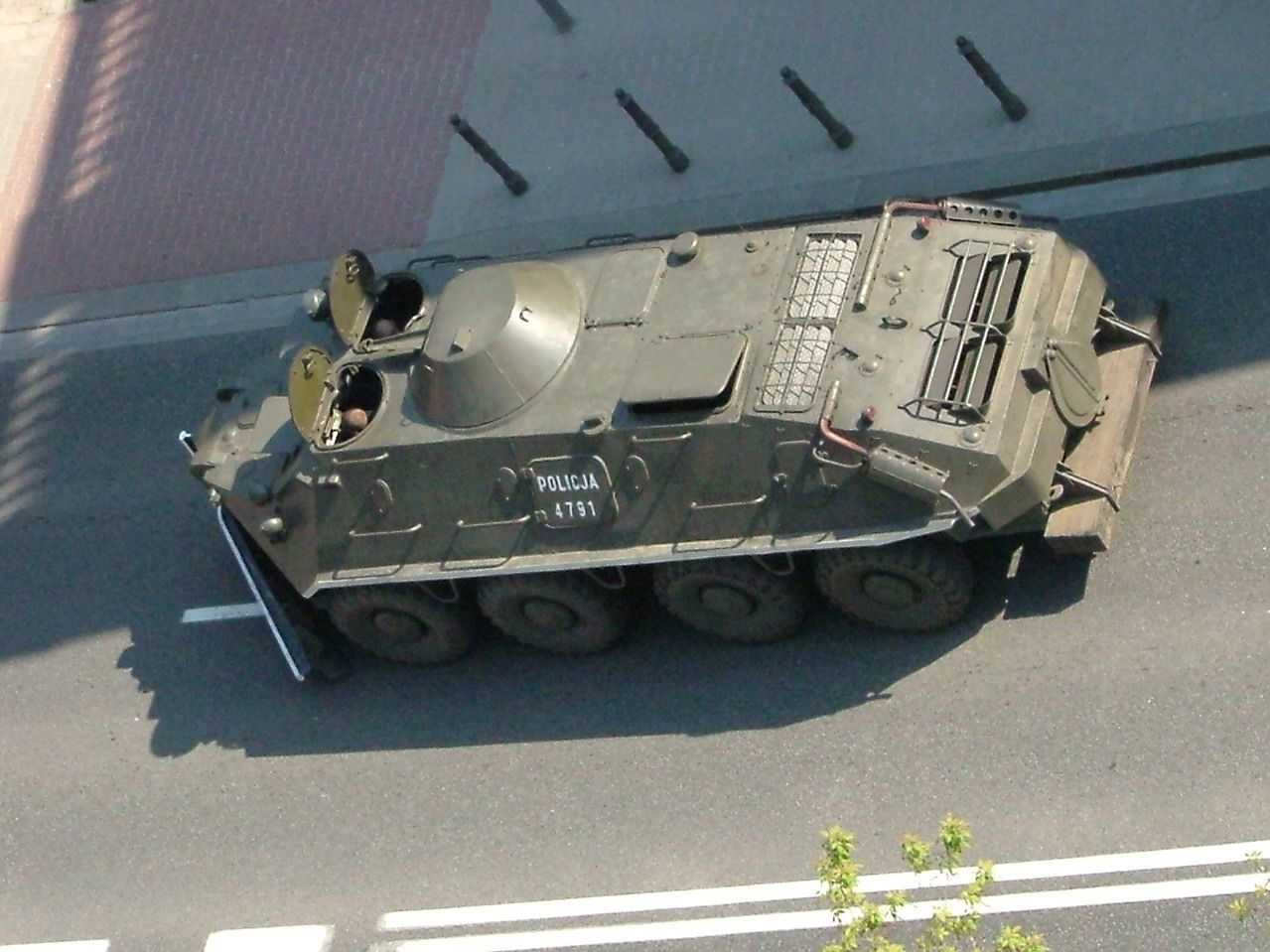
Polish-modified BTR-60PB of the Polish Police on Tamka Street in Warsaw, Poland during European Economy Summit 2004. Notice the lack of armament.

Milicja Obywatelska (MO) operated several BTR-60PAs. They were used by ZOMO riot control units. The Polish Army also received a dozen BTR-60PU-12s, which were used within the Soviet supplied 9K33 Osa SAM regiment delivered between 1980 and 1985. On 7 December 1981, the delegation of the Polish Ministry of Internal Affairs went to the Soviet Ministry of Internal Affairs asking for equipment and supplies necessary to equip around 60,000 MO operatives and reservists enlisted because of the intensified activities against the Communist government. In response, on 17 December, the Soviet Ministry of Internal Affairs decided to transfer 25 BTR-60PBs along with 10,250,000 "Czeromucha" incapacitating chemical devices and 2,000 tonnes of gas over to its Polish counterpart. These vehicles had previously been used in Afghanistan. They were later modified by adding another radio set. They were used by ZOMO.

During martial law in Poland, the MSW automobile plant in Łódź fitted some BTRs with breakers mounted on the front of the vehicle, which were used for clearing obstacles (See Poland section in the Variants section for details). When the Milicja Obywatelska was transformed back into Policja in 1990, all BTR-60PBs had their armament removed. This was because Policja, unlike MO, didn't have a need for weaponry with such a high muzzle velocity – such weapons were dangerous to use in urban areas. The MO needed such weaponry because it was also supposed to carry out anti-partisan operations. Policja used unarmed BTR-60PBs for security during European Economy Summit 2004 in Warsaw, as well as for clearing blockades set up by the Samoobrona political party. A few Police BTR-60PBs are kept in storage for anti-riot duty as barricade breakers.

==== People's Republic of China ====
China reversed engineered the BTR-60PB after capturing four examples during the Sino-Soviet border conflict on Zhenbao Island in March 1969. The program was completed in the late 1970s. However, the vehicle did not enter service in large numbers because China's primitive road system and rugged terrain meant that the wheeled APC was not well suited for the Chinese conditions as it lacked the cross country capability of the tracked APCs in the Chinese inventory.

Before the Sino-Soviet split, China imported 100 BTR-40s and 100 BTR-152s from the USSR and manufactured copies of those vehicles; and these served with the PLA until the mid-1990s. The experience gained through reverse-engineering the BTR-60 helped China in developing other more advanced wheeled APCs later in the 1980s.

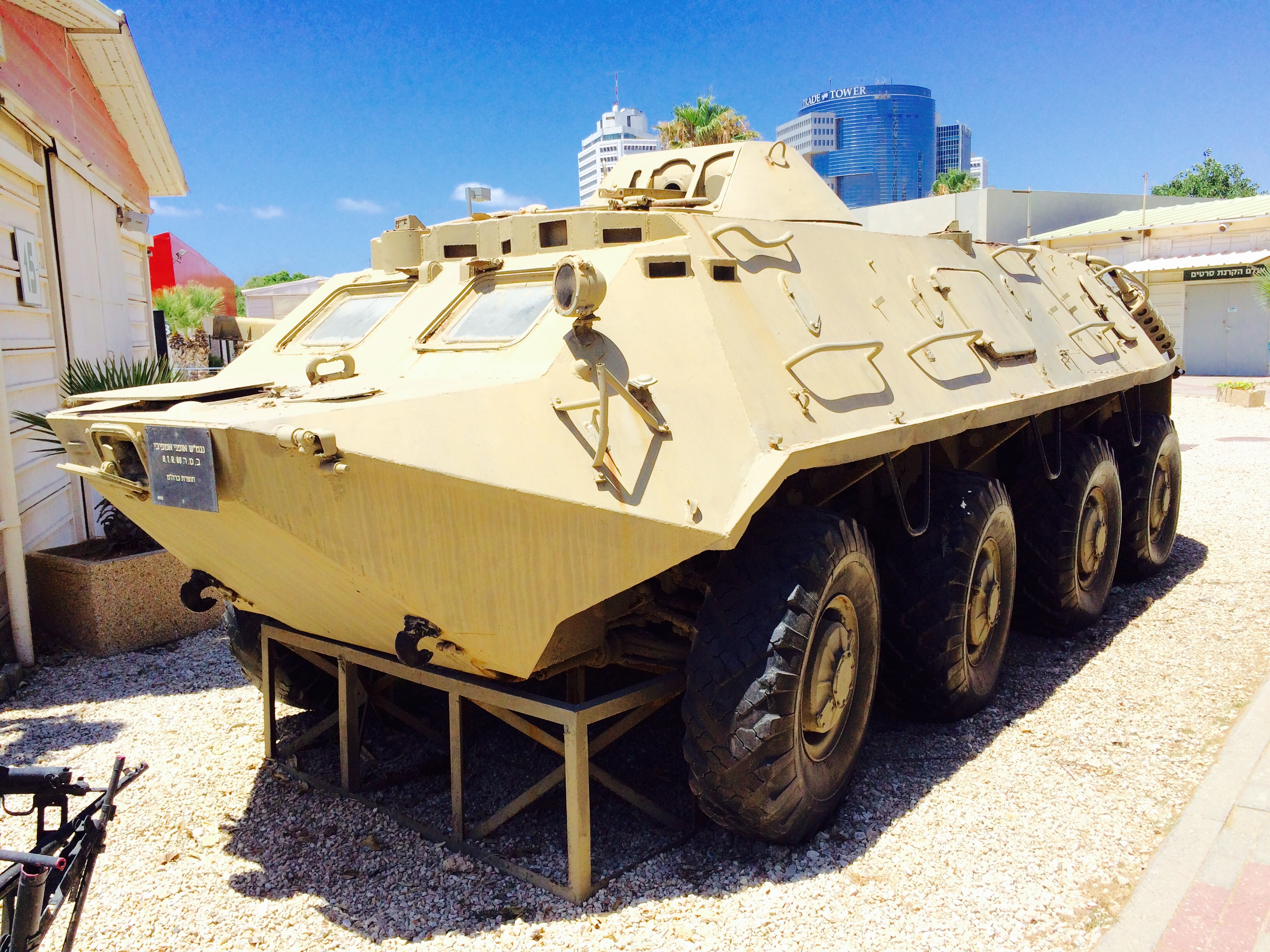
BTR-60PB captured by Israel during the Yom Kippur War. This example now resides at the IDF History Museum, Tel Aviv.

=== List of conflicts ===
- 1965–1973 – Vietnam War (North Vietnam)
- 1966–1991 – South African Border War (Angola, Cuba)
- 1967 – Six-Day War (Egypt, Syria)
- 1968 – Soviet invasion of Czechoslovakia
- 1969 – Sino-Soviet border conflict (Soviet Union)
- 1973 – Yom Kippur War (Egypt, Syria)
- 1974–1991 – Ethiopian Civil War
  - 1961–1991 – Eritrean War for Independence
- 1975–1990 – Lebanese Civil War
- 1975–1991 – Western Sahara War (Polisario)
- 1975–2002 – Angolan Civil War
- 1977–1978 – Ogaden War
- 1978–1987 – Chadian–Libyan conflict
- 1978–present – Kurdish–Turkish conflict (Turkey)
- 1979–1988 – Soviet–Afghan War (Soviet Union, Afghanistan)
- 1980–1988 – Iran–Iraq War (Iran, Iraq)
- 1982 – 1982 Ethiopian–Somali Border War
- 1983 – Invasion of Grenada (Grenada)
- 1988–1993 – Georgian Civil War
  - 1992–1993 – War in Abkhazia
- 1988–1994 – First Nagorno-Karabakh War (Nagorno-Karabakh, Armenia, Azerbaijan)
- 1989 – Romanian Revolution (Romania)
- 1990–1991 – First Persian Gulf War (Iraq)
- 1991–present – Somali Civil War
- 1991–1999 – Yugoslav wars
- 1992–1997 – Civil War in Tajikistan
- 1993–2025 – Kurdish–Turkish conflict (Turkey)
- 1994 – Civil War in Yemen
- 1994–1996 – First Chechen War (Russia)
- 1999–2009 – Second Chechen War (Russia)
- 2001–2021 – War in Afghanistan
- 2003–2011 – Iraq War
  - 2003 – Invasion of Iraq (Iraq)
- 2011 – Libyan Civil War (Gaddafi and Anti-Gaddafi forces)
- 2011–present – Syrian civil war (Government forces and rebels)
- 2014–present – Russo-Ukrainian War
- 2020 – Second Nagorno-Karabakh War
- 2022–present – Russian invasion of Ukraine

== Variants ==
=== Former Soviet Union ===
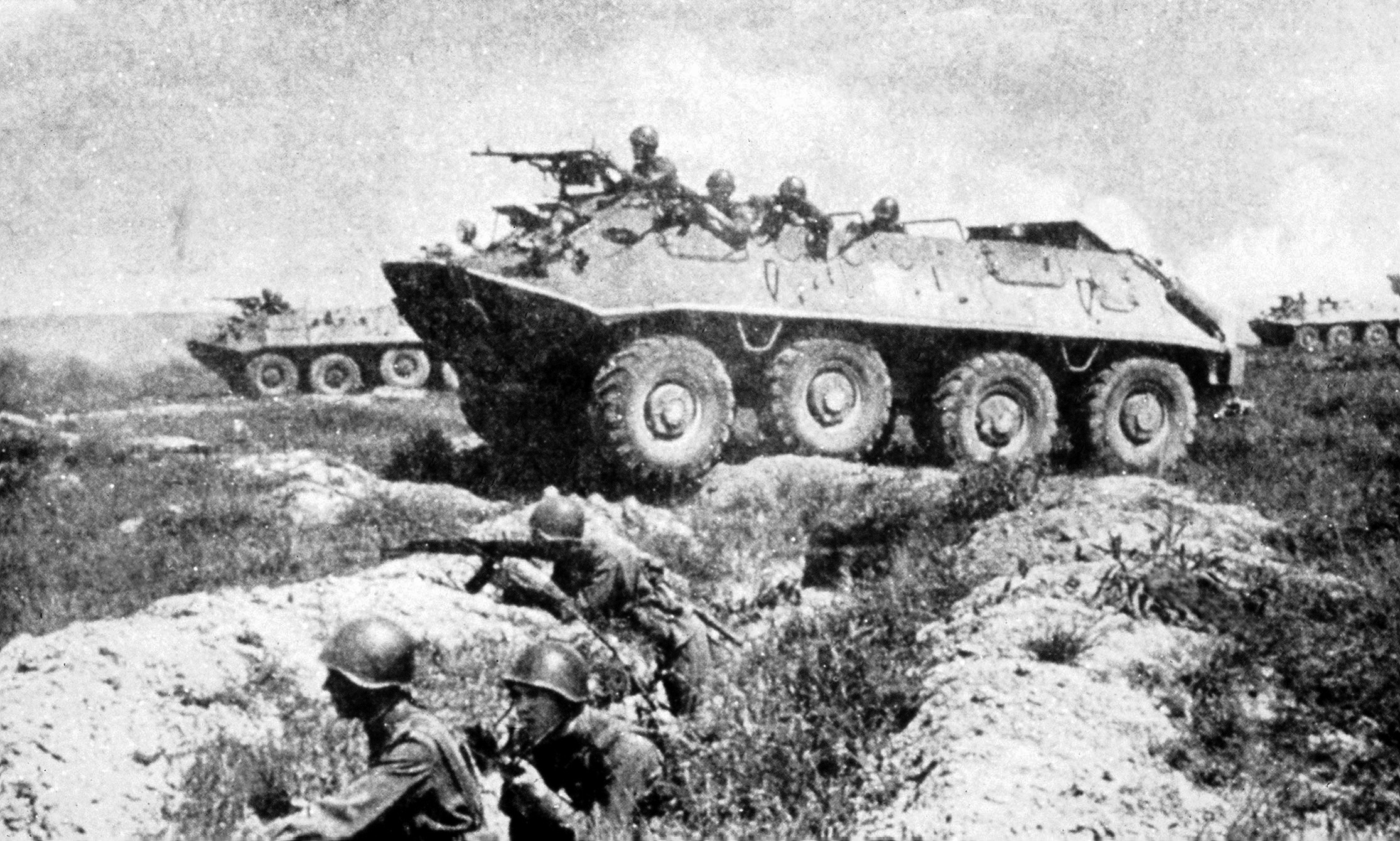
Three assaulting BTR-60P APCs supporting entrenched infantry.

- BTR-60P (1959) (P stands for plavajushhijj – literally "swimming", i.e. amphibious) – Initial version with troop compartment completely exposed and often covered with bows and canvas. The vehicle has mounting points for three 7.62 mm machine guns (either the PKT, the SGMB or the PKB tank/medium/general-purpose machine guns), one on the front and one on each side between the two small doors; however, only one mount is fitted, and that is usually on the front mounting point. The vehicle carries 2,000 machine gun rounds. It was also known under the designation GAZ-49.
  - BTR-60P with a modified machine gun mounting point in the front to fit the DShK 1938/46 12.7 mm heavy machine gun like in BTR-60PA instead of the 7.62 mm machine gun. The vehicle carries 500 rounds for the DShK 1938/46 12.7 mm heavy machine gun and 3,000 rounds for 7.62 mm machine guns.
  - BTR-60P converted into a command vehicle equipped with a rail-type antennae running around three sides of the hull top.
  - BTR-60P M1961/1 – BTR-60P converted into a fire support vehicle. It is fitted with the turret from the PT-76 amphibious light tank. Most probably prototype only.
    - BTR-60P M1961/1 fitted with a smaller version of the PT-76 turret. Most probably prototype only.
  - BTR-60P M1961/2 – BTR-60P converted into a fire support vehicle. It is fitted with a small open-topped turret armed with a 37 mm gun with clean barrel with conical flash-hider. Most probably prototype only.
  - BTR-60P converted into a mortar carrier. It can carry up to two mortars, along with their crews and ammunition.
  - MTR-2 – BTR-60P converted into a repair vehicle with a raised tarpaulin cover over the troop compartment running almost to the rear.

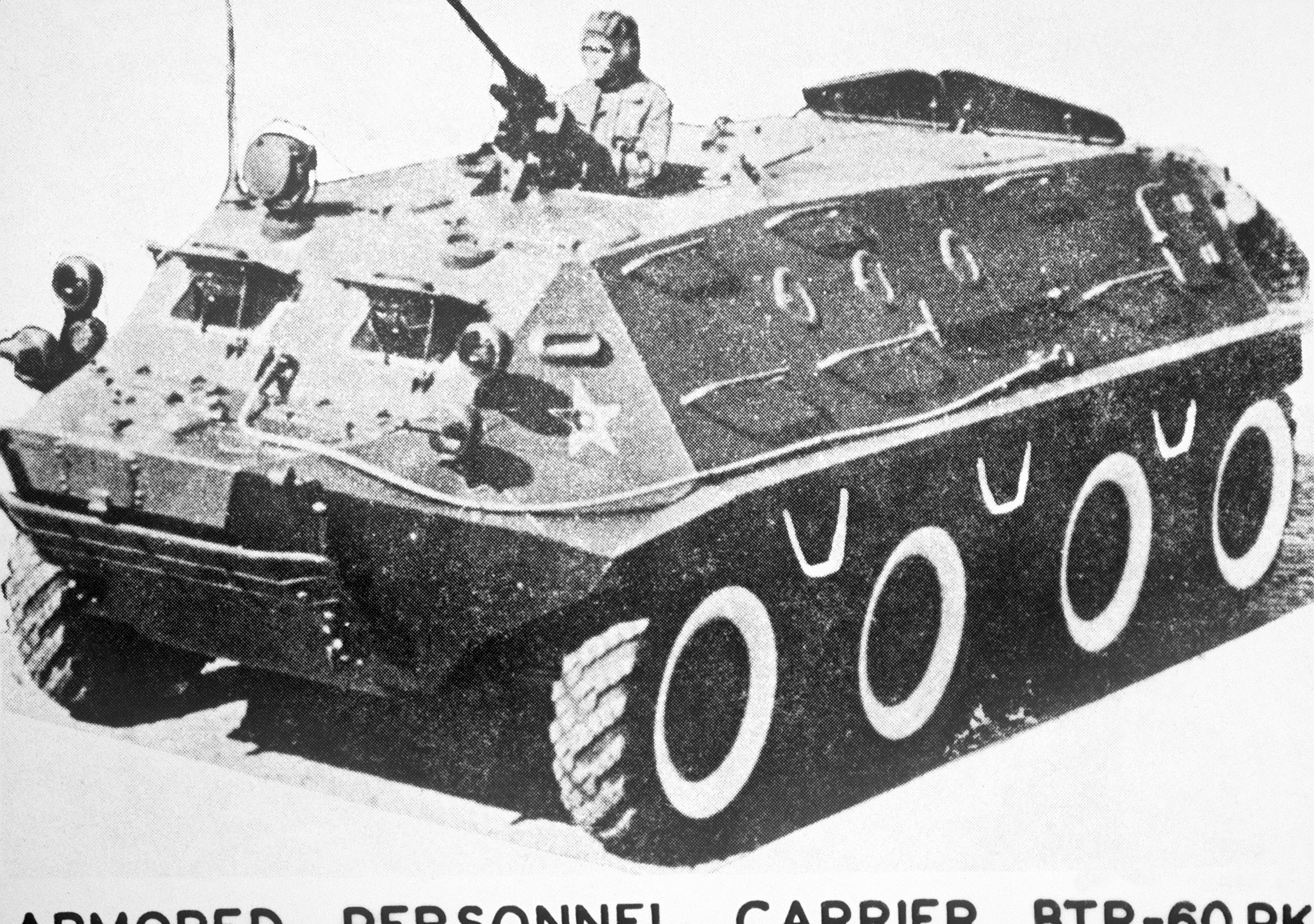
BTR-60PA.

- BTR-60PA (1963) – This version has an armoured roof over the troop compartment. It is fitted with improved 'closed-down' vision devices for the crew. Behind the commander's and driver's hatches is a single rear-opening rectangular hatch in front of which is a single mount for the DShK 1938/46 12.7 mm heavy machine gun between the two circular crew hatches at the front of the personnel compartment and two optional mounts for 7.62 mm machine guns (either the PKT, the SGMB or the PKB tank/medium/general-purpose machine guns) on each side of the roof of the personnel compartment. Early production BTR-60PAs only had a single mount for the 7.62 mm machine gun between the two circular crew hatches at the front of the personnel compartment. The small doors on each side of the hull that were present in the BTR-60P were removed. The BTR-60PA introduced collective NBC protection system to the series. It has six handrails on the each side, in rows of three. The personnel compartment has two rectangular hatches. The fact that the roof has been added makes passengers more vulnerable to enemy fire while they're exiting the vehicle through the top hatches. Also, the gunner must be at least shoulder high out of the vehicle to operate the weapons. The vehicle carries 500 rounds for the DShK 1938/46 12.7 mm heavy machine gun and 3,000 rounds for 7.62 mm machine guns. The weight of the vehicle increased from 9.8 tonnes to 10.2 tonnes. It was also known under the designation BTR-60PK, where K stands for krisha – "roof" and GAZ-49A.
  - BTR-60PA-1 (1965) – Upgraded BTR-60PA with improved power plant and transmission and the R-123 radio instead of the R-113. The weight of the vehicle increased from 10.2 tonnes to 10.3 tonnes. It entered service in very small numbers.
  - BTR-60PA converted into a command vehicle equipped with two side-mounted angled telescopic masts.
  - MTP-2 (MTP stands for mashina tekhnicheskoj pomoshchi) – BTR-60PA converted into a technical support vehicle based on the BTR-60PA. It is equipped with a crane mounted on the front of the hull. While in transport, the crane is carried on the left-hand side of the vehicle. It's also fitted with several stowage boxes, two on the roof behind the front hatches, one smaller on the front of the right-hand side of the hull and two over the engine decks. It is also missing two or three hand rails.
  - BTR-60PAI (1965) – Initial version with the DShK 1938/46 12.7 mm heavy machine gun replaced by the conical BPU-1 turret from the BRDM-2, which is armed with the KPVT 14.5 mm heavy machine gun and the PKT 7.62 mm coaxial tank machine gun, on the top of the vehicle. The turret is placed over the second axle. The two remaining mountings for 7.62 mm machine guns on the upper hull sides were removed. Since the turret has been added, the crew had increased from two to three (commander, driver, and gunner). There are two semicircular hatches for the crew in front of the turret. The vehicle carries 500 rounds for the KPVT 14.5 mm heavy machine gun and 3,000 rounds for the PKT 7.62 mm coaxial tank machine gun.

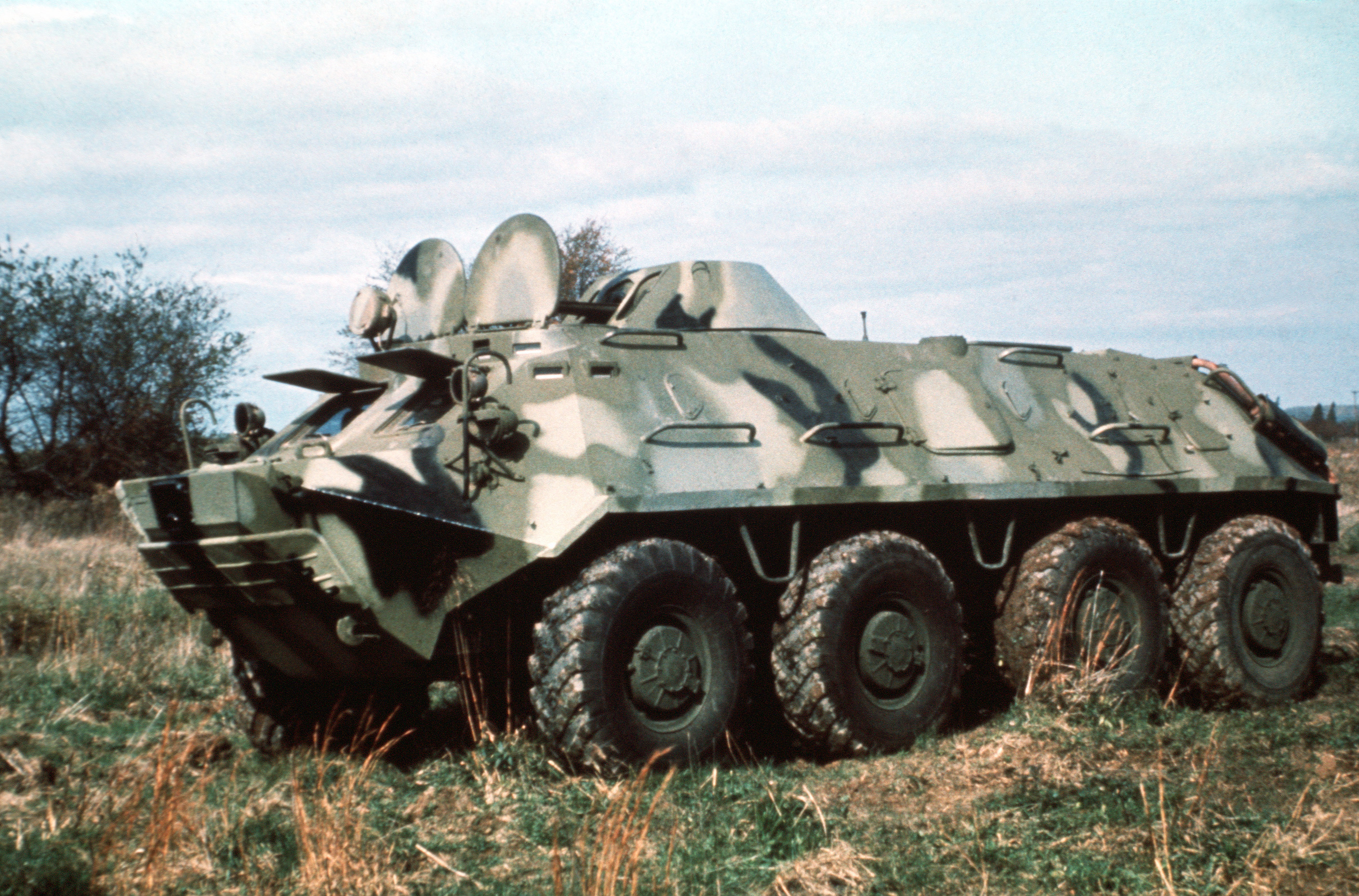
BTR-60PB, 14 November 1984.

- BTR-60PB (1966) – Improved sighting system for 14.5 mm KPVT heavy machine gun and improved GAZ-49B engine. The turret was modified to include a new telescopic sight, the 14.5 mm KPVT heavy machine gun and the 7.62 mm PKT coaxial light machine gun were moved to the right, while the telescopic sight was mounted coaxially to the left. The armour protection has also been improved. The frontal armour of the BTR-60PB can withstand fire from 7.62 mm bullets from any range, while the rest of its armour can withstand fire from 7.62 mm bullets from 100 m. It has a filtration and over pressurization system for NBC protection. It also has self-sealing tires, a central tire inflation system and antennae mount on the right hand side of the rear of the roof. It has a side door in the left side of the front part of the troop compartment. Some BTR-60PBs also lack one of the firing ports on the left side of the hull. Late production BTR-60PBs have the same sighting improvement as the BTR-70, which consists of a small additional episcope sight, which faces to the rear on the turret roof. The vehicle carries 500 rounds for 14.5 mm KPVT heavy machine gun and 3,000 rounds for 7.62 mm PKT coaxial light machine gun. It was also known under the designation GAZ-49B.
  - BTR-60PB produced during the BTR-80 production run. It has a side door in the right side of the front part of the troop compartment.
  - BTR-60PB converted into an agitation and propaganda vehicle. It is fitted with the same turret as the BTR-70ZS.
  - BTR-60PB converted into a command vehicle equipped with two side-mounted angled telescopic masts.
  - GAZ-4907 – BTR-60PB converted into a specialized chassis used by a few command variants.
  - BTR-60PBK (K stands for komandnyj – "command") (1975) – Company commander version, based on the specialized chassis GAZ-4907. This version is equipped with three radio sets (two R-123 and one R-148), as well as three whip antennas and an antenna mast on the left upper hull. Late-production models have a modified turret and additional Pin Stick antenna.
  - BTR-60R-145BM "Chaika" – Turret-less command vehicle, based on the GAZ-4907 chassis and fitted with a collapsible AZI frame antenna, the AMU 10 m high telescopic mast, the AB-1-P/30 generator, five radio sets (one R-123MT, one R-130, two R-111 and one R-012M) as well as the TA-57 field telephone. It is also known under the designation BTR-60PU.
    - BTR-60R-145BM-1 – Modernized model.
    - BTR-60R-149BM – Command vehicle based on BTR-60R-145BM-1.
  - BTR-60PZ (zenitnyj) (1972) – Version with an improved turret similar to that on the BTR-70, which can be used to fire at flying targets. It's equipped with the 1PZ-2 roof-mounted periscope mounted on the turret. The armament has a high angle of elevation. It entered service in very small numbers.
  - BTR-60 1V18 "Klyon-1" – BTR-60PB converted into an artillery command and forward observer vehicle, used by battery commanders of units equipped with towed artillery and MRL systems. The original turret has been replaced by an unarmed one ("Darth Vader") with the NNP-21 and DV observation devices and a rangefinder. Other specialized equipment comprises the UD-15G internal generator, four radio sets (three R-123M and one R-107M), as well as the 1V510 computer, the PUO-9M fire control set and the PAB-2A aiming circle. Crew consisted of five soldiers. Each 1V17 "Mashina-B" set consists of three 1V18s, one 1V19 (qv), three 1V110s (based on GAZ-66) and one 1V111 (based on ZIL-131).
    - BTR-60 1V18-1 – Modernized model.
  - BTR-60 1V19 "Klyon-2" – BTR-60PB converted into an artillery fire direction center externally identical to the BTR-60 1V18 but provided with the R-130M radio set and an additional stowage box on each upper side of the hull. Used by battalion commanders.
    - BTR-60 1V19-1 – Modernized model.
  - BTR-60 R-145BM – BTR-60PB converted into a turret-less communications vehicle and equipped with five radio sets: two R-111 or R-171, one R-123 or R-173, one R-130M, and one R-012M.

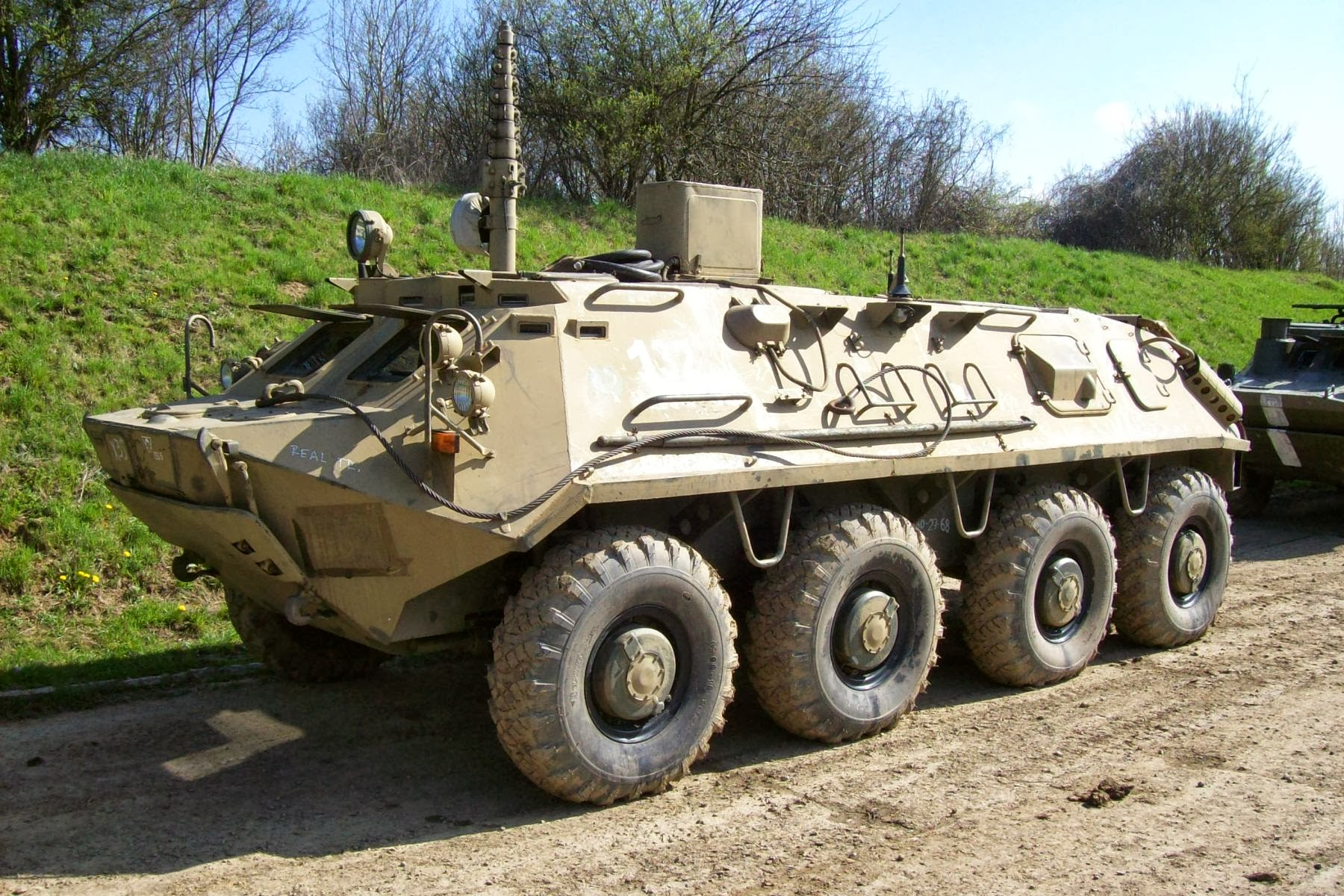
BTR-60PU-12

  - BTR-60PU-12 (9S482) (punkt upravleniya) (1972) – BTR-60PB converted into an air defense command vehicle and used by units equipped with ZSU-23-4, SA-9 or SA-13. The turret was removed and the vehicle was fitted with the AMU telescope mast on the right side of the front hull roof and the AB1-P/30 1 kW generator on top of the blanking plate. The vehicle is equipped with the 1G13 gyroscope, the KP-4 navigation apparatus and the ASPD-12 computer. Often, the PU-12 is connected to a radar and the radar image is directly visible on the vehicle's IT-45 monitor. BTR-60PU-12M can process up to 12 targets.
    - BTR-60PU-12M (9S482M) – Modernized model developed in the 1980s for units equipped with more modern SAM systems. This model is equipped with the more modern ASPD-U computer instead of the ASPD-12 and with the S 23-1 data processing unit connected to the MP-21, MP-22, Strela-10M, Osa-AK etc. BTR-60PU-12M can process up to 99 targets instead of only 12.
  - BTR-60R-975 – Vehicle used by Tactical Air Control Parties, equipped with four radio sets (R-123, R-134, R-853 and R-864), as well as the SMI-2 km beacon system (protected by a conical cover during transport) and the G-290B generator. It has two blade antennas on the rear of the deck.
    - BTR-60R-975M1 – Modernized version. It doesn't have the conical cover for the beakon system.
  - BTR-60R-137B – BTR-60PB converted into a USW signals vehicle similar to the BTR-60R-140BM. It is equipped with two radio sets: R-123 and R-405. It also has a frame antennae around the top of the hull and a telescopic mast on the right side of the front of personnel compartment's roof.
  - BTR-60R-140BM – BTR-60PB converted into a SW signals vehicle similar to the BTR-60R-137B. It is equipped with three radio sets: R-140, R-405, R-123.
  - BTR-60R-156BTR – BTR-60PB converted into a HF signals vehicle used on the operational level. It is equipped with the R-156 HF radio and two other radio sets: R-405 and R-123.
  - BTR-60R-409BM – BTR-60PB converted into a radio relay station similar to the BTR-60R-419BR equipped with the R-409 radio set.
  - BTR-60R-419BR – BTR-60PB converted into a low-frequency radio relay station similar to the BTR-60R-409BM.
  - BTR-60E-351BR – BTR-60PB converted into a battery charger vehicle used by signals units. It is equipped with a 20 kW generator. The vehicle has an extra seat and carries fuel inside for the generator.
  - BTR-60P-238BT – BTR-60PB converted into a switchboard vehicle (kompleksnaya apparatnaya telegrafnoj svyazi).
  - BTR-60P-239BT – BTR-60PB converted into a switchboard vehicle (kompleksnaya apparatnaya telegrafnoj svyazi).
  - BTR-60P-240BT – BTR-60PB converted into a switchboard vehicle (kompleksnaya apparatnaya telefonnoj svyazi).
  - BTR-60P-241BT – BTR-60PB converted into a switchboard vehicle (kompleksnaya apparatnaya telegrafnoj svyazi).
  - BTR-60MS – BTR-60PB converted into a communications Vehicle fitted with a "High Ball" antennae mount.
  - BTR-60MBP (MBP stands for mashina boyevogo posta) – BTR-60PB converted into a base security vehicle for Strategic Rocket units. The original turret has been replaced by a new type armed with a 12.7 mm NSV machine gun and equipped with an improved 1PN22M1 sight, loudspeakers, OU-3GA-2 IR search lights and additional TNPO-170 periscopes. The vehicle is also equipped with a stowage box on the right side of the hull. Behind the right side troop compartment roof hatch, there's a small bolted on plate.
- BTR-70

==== Russia ====
- BTR-60PBM – BTR-60PB modernization fitted with a new engine in a new, bigger engine compartment similar to the one in the BTR-80. The exhaust pipes are also similar, if not identical, to the ones in BTR-80s. The right side of the hull has been altered: a side door with a small hand rail for the troop compartment was added, four out of five handrails were removed (the exception being the lower front one), the firing ports were replaced with one located next to the gunner's station and a stowage box was added next to the engine compartment. The modernization is done by the Arzamas Engineering Plant.
- MWS – Another upgrade of the BTR-60 was developed by Muromteplovoz JSC. This one is powered by the YaMZ-236A 195 hp diesel engine in a much bigger engine compartment, with a service hatch on the rear side and only one exhaust pipe, on the left side. The first prototype – sometimes called BTR-60BD – was in fact an upgraded R-145BM command vehicle. The vehicle that was shown during IDELF-2006 in Moscow was a modified BTR-60PB with the original machine gun turret replaced by the MB2 modular turret with a 2A42 30mm gun.
  - MWS-M – MWS with altered sides of the hull. On the left side, two handrails were removed (the center lower and the rear lower) and a stowage box was added in the center. On the right side, two handrails were removed (the center upper and lower), a new handrail was added to the upper rear. The firing ports were removed on both sides.
  - The latest upgrade was shown for the first time during MAKS-2011. This version also has a new diesel engine, the YaMZ-236D (as found on the BTR-70D upgrade), but here the engine compartment has been relocated to the center of the hull. The troop compartment with eight seats is now at the very end of the hull, has a raised roof line and two exit doors. There are no periscopes for the infantry squad and only two firing ports, in the rear doors. On top of the troop compartment is a new MA7-02 turret. This turret is fitted with a 1PZ-7A sight and armed with a 12.7 mm machine gun "Kord", an automatic grenade launcher AG-17, a coaxial machine gun PKTM 7.62 mm and 81mm smoke grenade launchers 902V.
  - 9K35M3-K "Kolchan" ("quiver [for arrows]") – During MAKS-2007, Muromteplovoz showed a SAM launch vehicle, based on an upgraded BTR-60 and armed with the Strela-10 launcher fitted to the hull roof.
- Irtish – BTR-60PB converted into civilian repair vehicle. It has a crane mounted in the front of the hull and a crate on top of the hull. The turret was removed. It is also missing two hand rails, one in the center of the upper side of the hull and one in the center of the lower side of the hull. The firing ports are blocked. The steel covers for the windshields are removed. The periscopes were removed. A window was added on the front part of each side of the hull.
- BTR-60PB converted into a civilian armoured firefighting vehicle. The turret and center hand rails were removed and all firing ports were blocked. The steel covers for the windshields were removed, as were the periscopes. A window was added on the front part of each side of the hull. It was fitted with a crate on top of the hull.
- BTR-60PPM – BTR-60PB converted into a civilian armoured firefighting vehicle. The turret and center hand rails were removed, as were the steel covers for the windshields. The firing ports were all blocked, as were the periscopes. Three windows were added on each side of the hull. It was fitted with a crate on top of the hull. It also carries an A-crane on the right side of the hull.

=== Ukraine ===
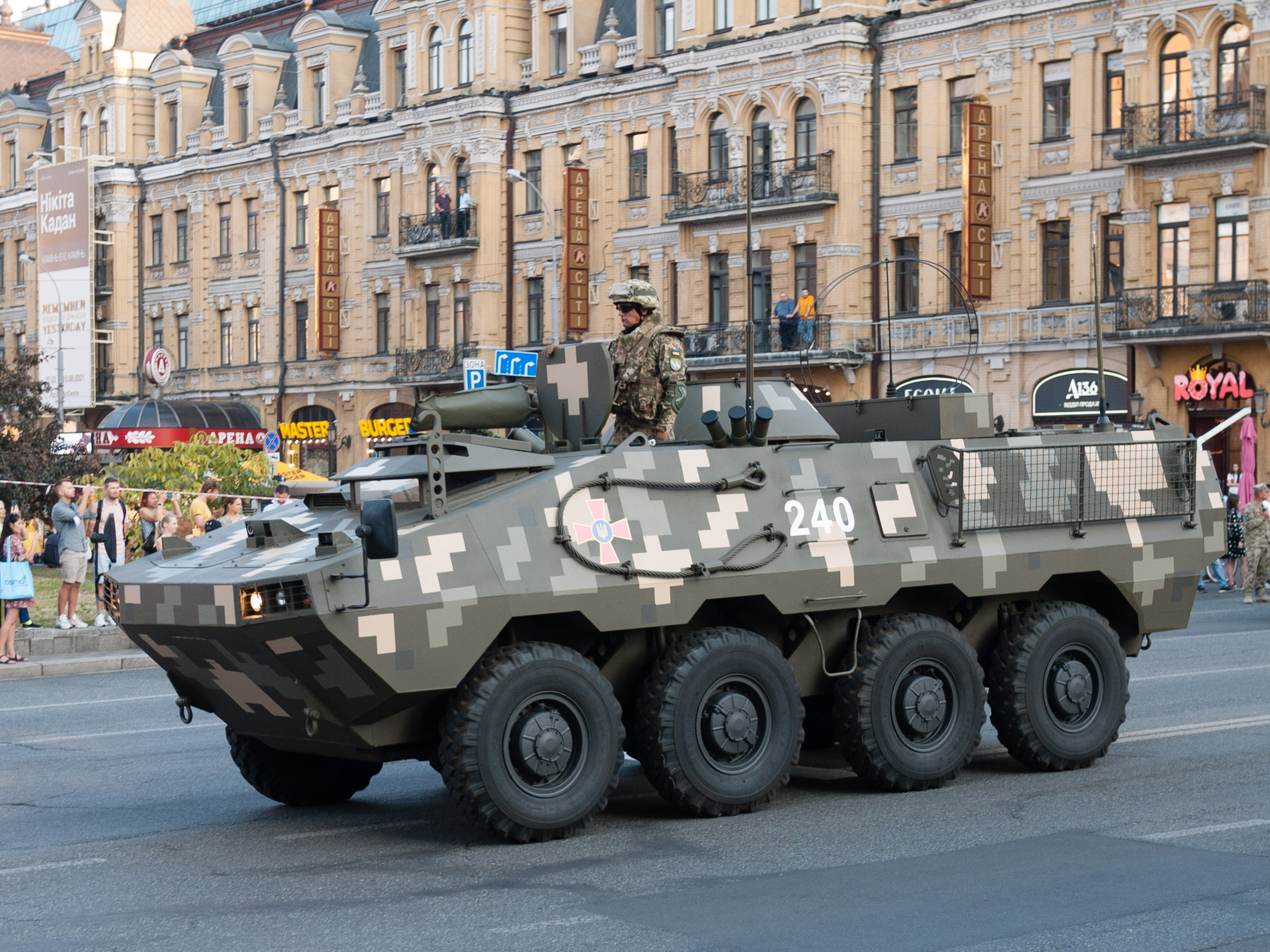
BTR-60HM Khorunzhyi, Kyiv, 2021

- BTR-60D – Ukrainian modernisation of the BTR-60 supplied by Bulgaria in early 2024. Includes new seating arrangement, side doors, thermal imaging camera for gunner as well as driver. The driver also gets a rear view camera. Increased protection due to new Armox 500T spaced armour. Original Gaz-40P gas engines are replaced by a pair of Deutz BF4M2012 diesel engines. New radio station Lybid K-2RB and navigation station CH-4215.
- Practika Khorunzhyi - overall deep modernisation that merely only uses the running gear of the old BTR-60. Armour and mine protection is slightly improved by using better materials (the vehicle's weight stays the same), it uses a new 300 HP engine, and the layout changes to have the dismounts in the back who enter via a ramp.

=== Bulgaria ===
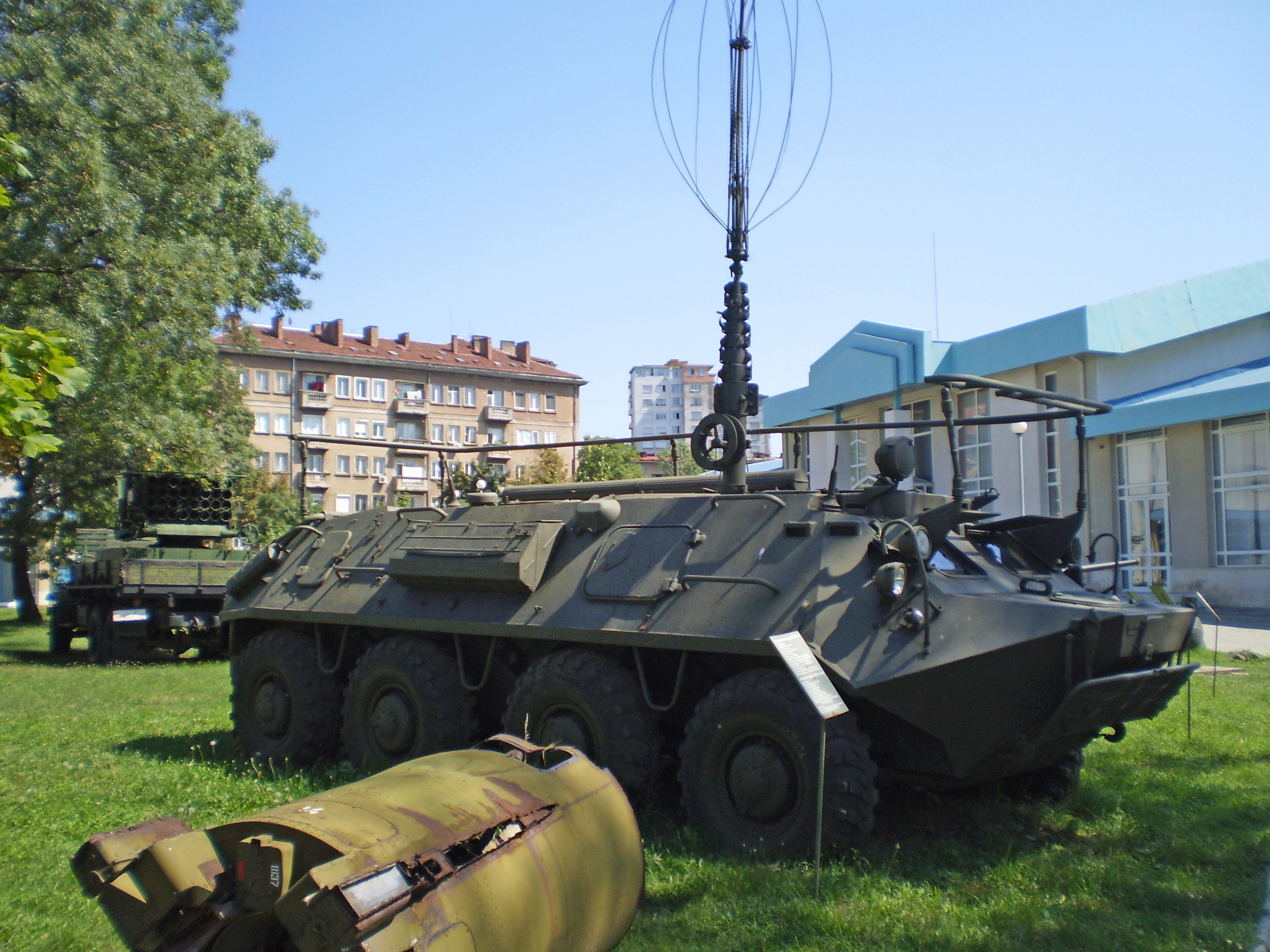
A BTR-60PAU

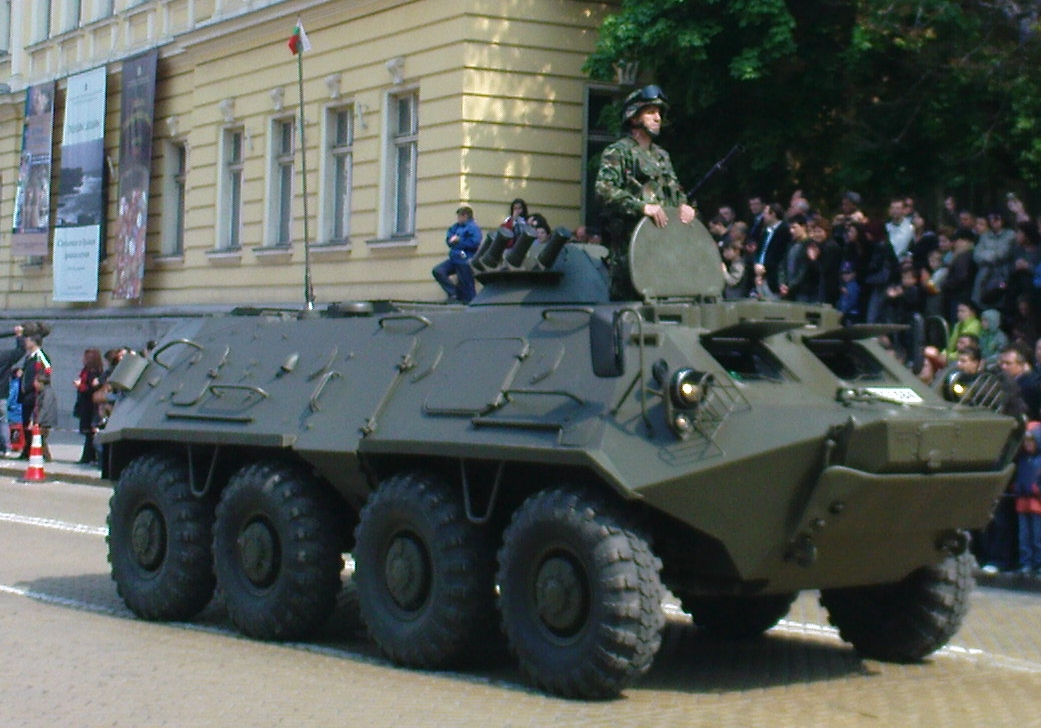
BTR-60PB-MD1 on the Army day parade in Sofia, 6 May 2009.

- BTR-60PAU – BTR-60PA converted into an artillery command vehicle equipped with 4 whip antennas.
- BTR-60PB experimentally fitted with the Polish WAT turret from SKOT-2AP. Only a prototype was made.
- BTR-60PB-MD (bronyetransport'or moderniziran) – BTR-60PB modernization fitted with the VAMO DT3900 or Rover TD-200 diesel engine, four MB smoke grenade launchers on the turret (two on each side), "Melopa" night sight, new day sight, new NBC protection system, modern radios. It also has a rear view mirror on the left hand side of the hull and side hatches. Only a prototype was made.
  - BTR-60PB-MD1 – BTR-60PB-MD variant developed for the Bulgarian army, fitted with the Cummins ISB 25.30 turbocharged diesel engine developing 250 hp (186 kW), additional protection for its headlights and eight smoke grenade launchers on the turret (four on each side). 150 in service.
  - BTR-60PB-MD3 – Export BTR-60PB-MD variant fitted with the KamAZ diesel engine, different sights, eight smoke grenade launchers in right-hand corner of the front of the hull and six on the turret (three on each side). It is also known under the designation BTR-60PB-MD2. The prototype, shown in 2004, was based on the BTR-60PA.

=== Cuba ===
- BTR-60PB fitted with a turret from the BMP-1. It also lacks the hand rails on the upper side of the hull.
- BTR-60PB armed with 100 mm gun in a heavily modified turret from the T-54. The hull is modified as well since the two hand rails on the side of the hull are gone and the other two are moved to the center of the hull between the upper and lower parts of the side of the hull. The lights in the front received armoured protection. The vehicle has two rear-view mirrors in the front corners of the hull (one on each side) The chassis has also been modified as the vehicle has a BTR-80 style straight chassis with no slope near the engine compartment. Because of the size of the new turret the vehicle is most probably no longer an APC but an armoured car.
- BTR-60 armed with twin 23 mm anti-aircraft guns (probably ZU-23-2). It is designed to be used for anti-aircraft purposes.
- BTR-60 armed with twin 37 mm anti-aircraft guns. It is designed to be used for anti-aircraft purposes.

=== Djibouti ===
- BTR-60PB with its turret replaced by the one used in the French Panhard AML-90 light armoured car. Only one BTR-60PB was converted and it was done so to make use of a spare turret after the original AML-90 hull was destroyed in a road accident.

=== Finland ===
- BTR-60PA Only one vehicle.
- BTR-60PB fitted with stowage racks over the engine decks.
- BTR-60PBK – BTR-60PB upgrade with second radio transceiver telescope radio antenna and outside the vehicle on the deck an aggregate, cable wheel and equipment box
- BTR-60PUM – BTR-60R-145BM "Chaika" upgrade with new communication equipment and armed with the NSV 12.7 mm heavy machine gun.

Finland bought later two BTR-80s for testing out a replacement but ended up buying the domestic XA-180 series of vehicles, known later as Patria Pasi.

=== Former East Germany ===
- SPW-60P (SPW stands for Schützenpanzerwagen) – NVA designator for BTR-60P.
- SPW-60PA (SPW stands for Schützenpanzerwagen) – NVA designator for BTR-60PA.
  - SPW-60PA(S) – SPW-60PA converted into a staff vehicle.
- SPW-60PB (SPW stands for Schützenpanzerwagen) – NVA designator for the BTR-60PB.
  - SPW-60PB(ABS) (ABS stands for Artillerie-Beobachtungsstelle – "Artillery-Monitoring Center") – SPW-60PB converted into an artillery forward observer vehicle with 4 whip antennas (2 on the rear of the engine deck's roof), two small brackets on the top of the upper left-hand side of the hull with striped poles stowed, commander's and driver's hatches that fold forward horizontally and a modified commanders position with retractable observation device.
  - SPW-60PB(BBS) (BBS stands for Batterie-Beobachtungsstelle – "Battery-Monitoring Center") – SPW-60PB converted into a command vehicle for air-defense artillery batteries. Similar to the SPW-60PB but it has two whip antennas on the rear hull.
  - SPW-60PB(S) – SPW-60PB converted into a command vehicle.
  - NZ(B) MSR/PR (NZ stands for Nachrichtenzentrale) – SPW-60PB converted into a signals vehicle for motorized rifle and tank regiments. It is equipped with the R-123M, R-123MT and R-405 radio sets, the AB-2-0 generator mounted behind the turret and the F-1301 electronic telegraph. Turret has been blanked-off.
  - LBGS(B) (LBGS stands for Leitungsbaugerätesatz) – SPW-60PB converted into telephone cable layer. It is also known under the designation LBT.
  - R-137B – SPW-60PB converted into a signals vehicle. Differs externally from Soviet type and has some components from local production including the FF63M field telephone set.
  - R-140BM – SPW-60PB converted into a signals vehicle equipped with R-140M SW radio set, two movable whip antennas in the rear, a 10 m high telescopic mast and the AB-4-T/230-M1 generator. It differs externally from its Soviet counterpart and incorporates some components produced locally including the EKD 315 SW receiver.
  - R-409BM – SPW-60PB converted into a radio-relay station equipped with 2 R-409MA semi-sets, free receivers: the R-326, the R-123MT, the P-303-OB and the AB-2-0/230-M1 generator.
  - R-145BM/AKL1 – SPW-60PB converted into a signals vehicle. It is a R-145BM equipped with an additional R-870M set.
  - R-145BM/AKL2 – Signals vehicle. As R-145BM but with additional R-809M2 set.
  - R-145BM/L1 – Signals vehicle.
  - R-145BM/L2I – Signals vehicle with radiosets R-111, R-123MT, R-130M, R-809M2, R-859D and R-863 of −802
  - P-238BT – Switchboard vehicle (kompleksnaya apparatnaya telegrafnoj svyazi) SAS- and Chiffrier Services
  - P-239BT – Switchboard vehicle (kompleksnaya apparatnaya telegrafnoj svyazi) SAS- and Chiffrier Services
  - P-240BT – Switchboard vehicle (kompleksnaya apparatnaya telefonnoj svyazi) SAS- and Chiffrier Services
  - P-241BT – Switchboard vehicle (kompleksnaya apparatnaya telegrafnoj svyazi) SAS- and Chiffrier Services

=== Iran ===
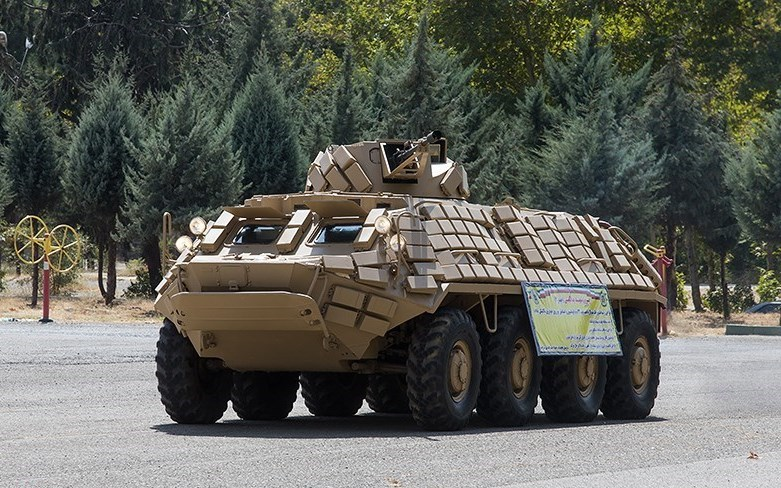
Iranian Heidar-7

- Sedad – Version of the BTR-60PB with the turret replaced with a 23 mm ZU-23-2 cannon installed with an optical device and CCD camera to allow the gunner to fire from inside the vehicle with day/night firing capability.
- Shahram – Modified BTR-60PB as a nuclear, radiological, biological and chemical (NRBC) detection lab. Has a single door on the left side of the hull, turret replaced with a range of detection and optics as a camera mounted on a mast, and a remote weapon station with a 7.62 mm machine gun and a bank of four smoke grenade dischargers on each side at the front of the hull.
- Heidar-5 – Minelayer version of the BTR-60PB with turret and crew compartment removed to place an automatic firing unit. The mine launching assembly has 18 mine launcher units mounted on each side of the hull, with each mine launcher unit having two preloaded magazines, each of which holds two anti-tank or anti-personnel mines. They can be ejected to create a mine barrier while the vehicle is moving. The front of the Heidar-5 is armed with a remotely-operated DShK heavy machine gun.
- Heidar-6 – Upgunned BTR-60PB equipped with a BMP-1 turret armed with a 73 mm cannon fed through a 40-round magazine, 7.62 mm coaxial machine gun, and AT-3 Sagger wire-guided anti-tank missile with one carried in the launch position and two reloads that are loaded by a rail through a hatch in the forward part of the turret roof.
- Heidar-7 - BTR-60PB equipped with Explosive reactive armour tiles, a new unmanned turret equipped with a singular 23mm auto-cannon, internal display panels, and an improved engine.

=== Israel ===
- BTR-60PB fitted with the CARDOM 120/81 mm mortar system in its troop compartment. The turret and the roof over the troop compartment have been removed. The roof over the crew compartment along with both hatches remains. A ladder was added to at least one side of the hull to allow easier mounting and dismounting. It was designed by Soltam.
- BTR-60 upgrade designed by Nimda fitting it with new power unit and automatic transmission which improves both mobility and reliability.
- BTR-60 modernization designed by Saymar. The following operations were carried out as a part of this modernization:
  - Removing all of the vehicle's systems and parts.
  - Adding a bolted-on superstructure with two hatches in its front, going all the way from the front hatches to the engine compartment which is necessary to adapt the vehicle to the new systems and parts. (The engine compartment now externally resembles the Russian MWS one. However it does not have a service hatch in the back and is angled near the top, also it has rear lights mounted on both sides of the engine compartment although the lights themselves are different.)
  - Sandblasting and repainting the hull.
  - Reassembling the vehicle with new and improved systems and parts as well as installing a new split transfer box that includes a limited split differential and a monitoring system allowing driving in rough terrain and improving the cross-country capabilities.
  - Replacing the two GAZ-40P petrol engines with a single Caterpillar diesel engine developing 300 hp.
  - Fitting a number of new parts for the new engine including a clutch system, split gear case, axillary engine systems, cooling systems, air inlet system, exhaust system.
  - Converting and adapting a new fuel system for the diesel engine and integrating new and bigger fuel tanks to increase the maximum operational range.
  - Installing a new and advanced electrical system including an advanced control panel and the replacement of all internal and external lighting.
  - Increasing the driver's field of view by installing a rearview camera with an LCD screen.
  - Improving the man-machine interface. The vehicle is armed with a pintle-mounted M2 heavy machine gun in the front and a second machine gun of a smaller caliber mounted on a "ring" in the rear. The rear machine gun is controlled from the inside, using the "ring" to move and can rotate a full 360°. The vehicle also has two whip antennas in the front part of the superstructure. The modernization can also be applied to the BTR-70.

=== Mexico ===
- APC-70 – Turret-less APC used by the Mexican marines, based on a civilian variant of the BTR-60 without firing ports, periscopes and with additional bulletproof windows. Armament consists of a single machine gun (either the Heckler & Koch HK21 or FN MAG-58 7.62) or a Mk 19 grenade launcher. It is also known under the designation BTR-60PB-MX.
  - APC-70 fitted with an A-frame crane.

=== People's Republic of China ===
- BTR-60PB reverse engineered.

=== Poland ===
- BTR-60PB fitted with an additional radio set.
  - BTR-60PB modified by the MSW automobile plant for use during the martial law in Poland by ZOMO fitted with a two-sided breaker, weighing 1.5 tonnes, mounted to the front of the vehicle and a counter weight mounted to the rear of the vehicle. The breaker itself is made out of rail tracks and a dozen mm thick plate. It also has an additional protection on the OU-3 infrared searchlight as well as aerial seatbelts for the driver and commander.

=== Romania ===
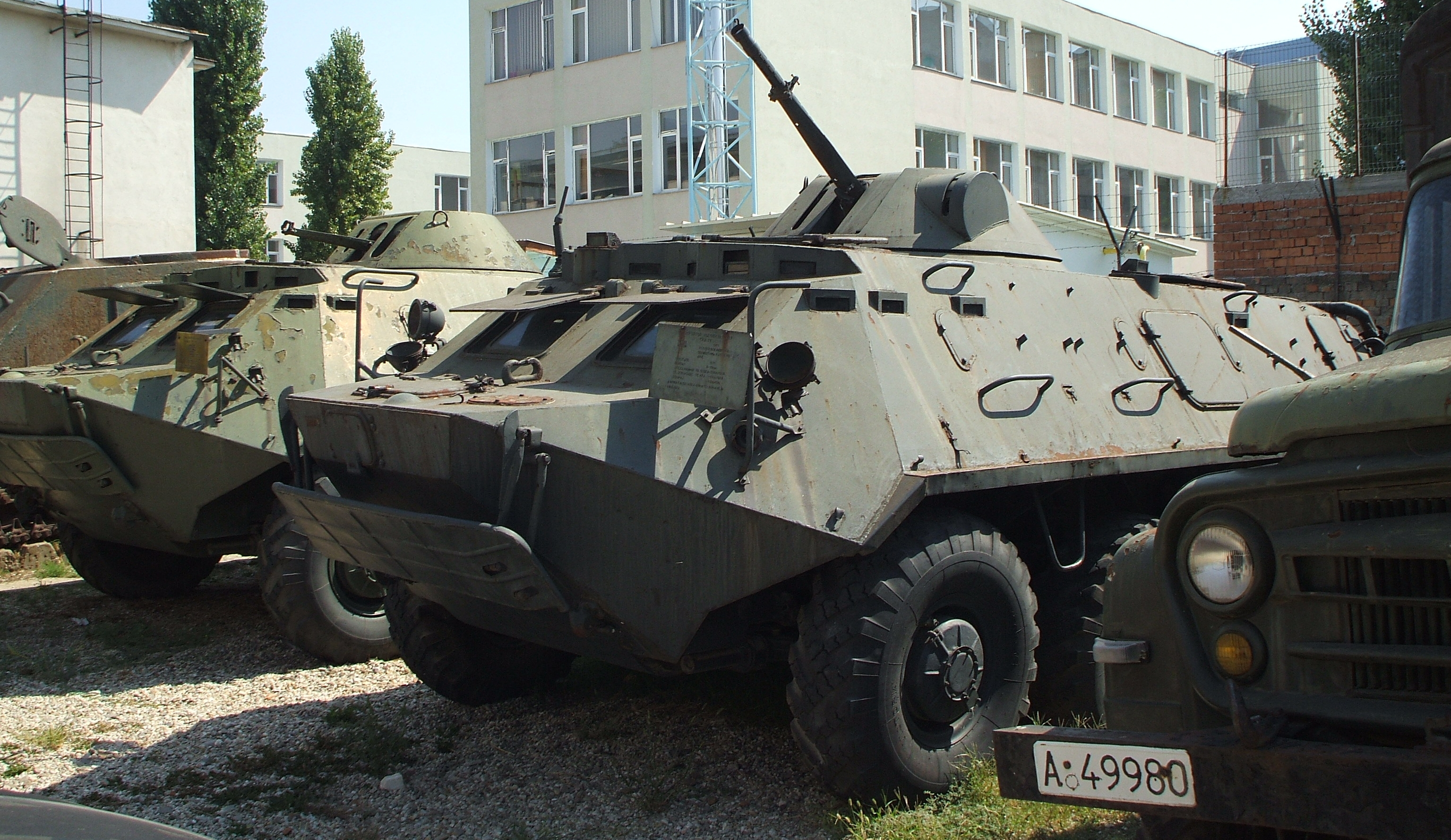
A Soviet BTR-60PB APC (left) and a Romanian TAB-71 APC (right) on display at "King Ferdinand" National Military Museum.

- TAB-71 series (TAB stands for transportor amfibiu blindat – "amphibious armored carrier") – Romania was the only other country to produce the BTR-60PB. When the Army of the Socialist Republic of Romania explored the possibility of license-producing the BTR-60PB in the late 1960s, the Soviets consented, probably to preempt further collaboration between Romania and the "heretic" Yugoslavs.
  - TAB-71 – The initial turretless version, entered production in 1970. It was essentially a BTR-60P with two Romanian 140 hp engines instead of the regular 90 hp engines. This version was produced in small numbers.
  - TAB-71M – Occasionally called TAB-72. This was a version of the BTR-60PB with a modified turret and uprated engines. The sole external difference between a BTR-60PB and a TAB-71M is the protruding gun sight on the left side of the turret of the Romanian vehicle. The Romanian-modified turret allows anti-aircraft fire, thus increasing the combat value of this Romanian license-built Soviet vehicle.
  - TAB-71A R-1 450 – Command version
  - TAB-71A R-1 451 – Command version
  - TAB-71A R-1 452 – Command version
  - TAB-71AR – Occasionally called TAB-73. This version carried an 82 mm mortar mounted in the superstructure of the troop compartment, where the turret would usually be. When it was revealed to the public in November 1975, it became the first known mortar-carrying APC of a Warsaw Pact army other than that of the Soviet Union.
  - TERA-71 (tractor de evacuare şi reparat auto) – Maintenance and recovery version.
  - TERA-71L (tractor de evacuare şi reparat auto) – Maintenance and recovery version.

=== Yemen ===
- BTR-60PB with its turret replaced by the one used in the French Panhard AML-90 light armoured car. This was functionally identical to the same conversion carried out in Djibouti, but initiated on a larger scale. Multiple Yemeni BTR-60PBs received this upgrade in mid 2014.

=== Vietnam ===
- PR-DM-60-PU: BTR-60BP with its turret removed configured as a mobile communications and command station is equipped with satcom, a collapsible antenna, and a high-power generator.

== Operators ==
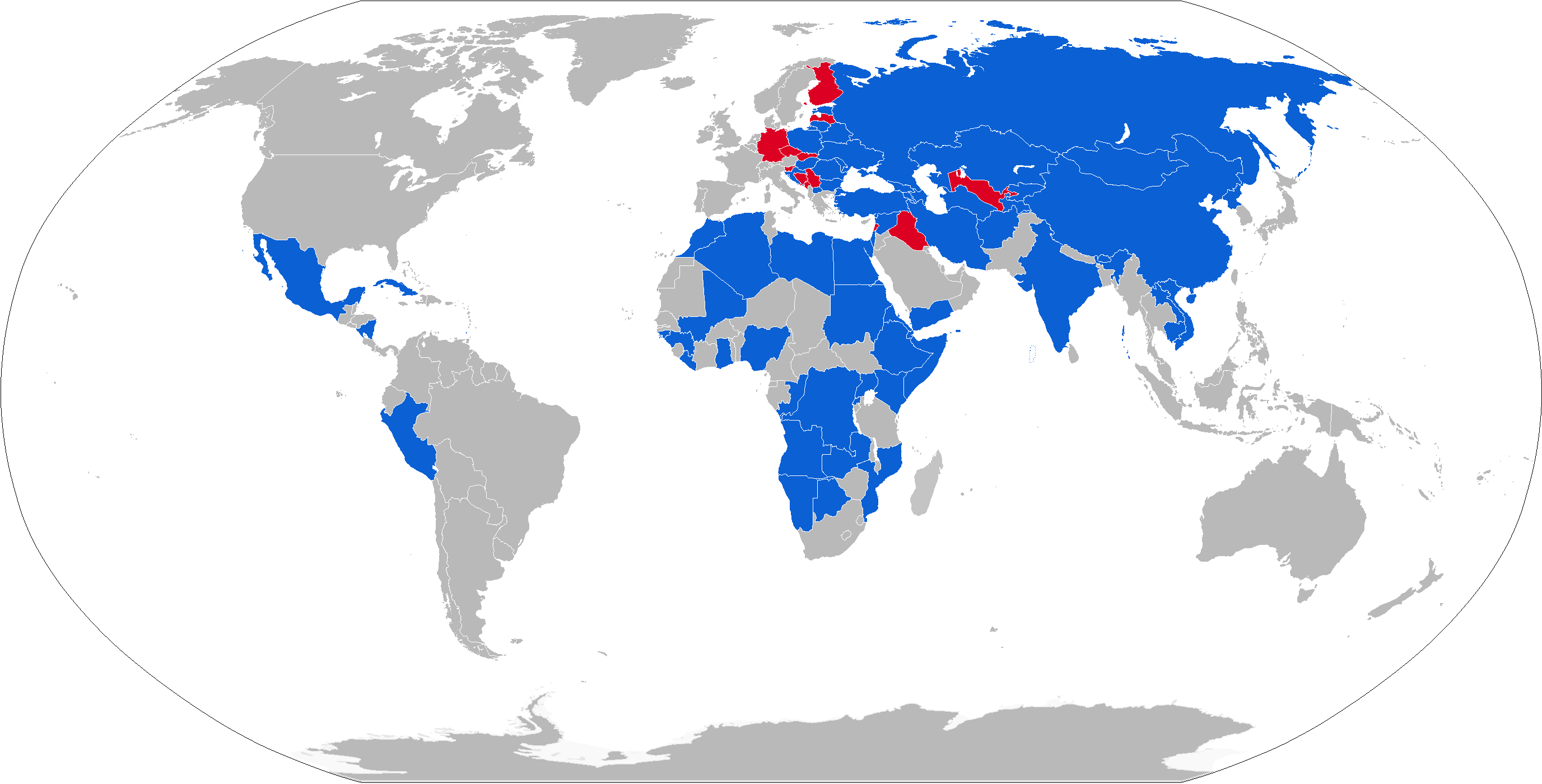
Operators: Current Former

=== Current ===
- Algeria − 250 BTR-60 as of 2024, some modified to carry 9M133 Kornet missiles
- Armenia − 108 as of 2024, some are used by the police and 5 are used by border guards
- Azerbaijan − 10 as of 2024, some are used by the gendarmerie and border guards
- Bhutan − 27 donated by India. All currently active.
- Botswana − 50 as of 2024
- Bulgaria − 20 as of 2024
- Cambodia − 200 BTR-60 and BTR-152 as of 2024
- Chad − 20 as of 2024
- Congo-Brazzaville − 30 as 2024
- Congo-Kinshasa − Around 30 up to 70 as of 2024
- Cuba − 500 BTR-50, BTR-60, and BTR-152 as of 2024
- Djibouti − 12 as of 2024, serviceability doubtful
- Egypt − 250 BTR-60 as 2024
- Eritrea − 25 BTR-60 and BTR-152 as of 2024
- Ethiopia − Unknown number in service as of 2024
- Guinea − 8 as of 2024
- Guinea-Bissau − 35 BTR-40 and BTR-60 as of 2024
- Iran − 500 supplied from 1967 to 1970. 300 BTR-50 and BTR-60 in service as of 2024
- Laos − 30 BTR-40 and BTR-60 as of 2024
- (Libya) Libyan National Army − Operates an unknown number of BTR-60PBs as of 2024
- Mali − 10+ as of 2024
- Mexico − 3 in service with the Marines as of 2024
- Moldova − 80 TAB-71 as of 2024
- Mongolia − 150 as of 2024
- Mozambique − 160 as of 2024
- Namibia − 10 as of 2024
- Nicaragua − 45 in service and 15 in storage as of 2024
- North Korea − 500 BTR-60PA and 700 BTR-60PB in 2011, unknown number in service as of 2024
- People's Defense Units (YPG)
- Romania − 354 TAB-71 and 92 TAB-71AR as of 2024
- Russia − 800 in service and 1,300 BTR-60 and BTR-70 in storage as of 2024
- Sahrawi Republic − 25 BTR-60PB as of 2021
- Syria − Unknown number in service as of 2024
- Tajikistan − 23 BTR-60, BTR-70, and BTR-80 as of 2024
- Transnistria
- Turkmenistan − 120 as of 2024
- Uganda − 15 as of 2024

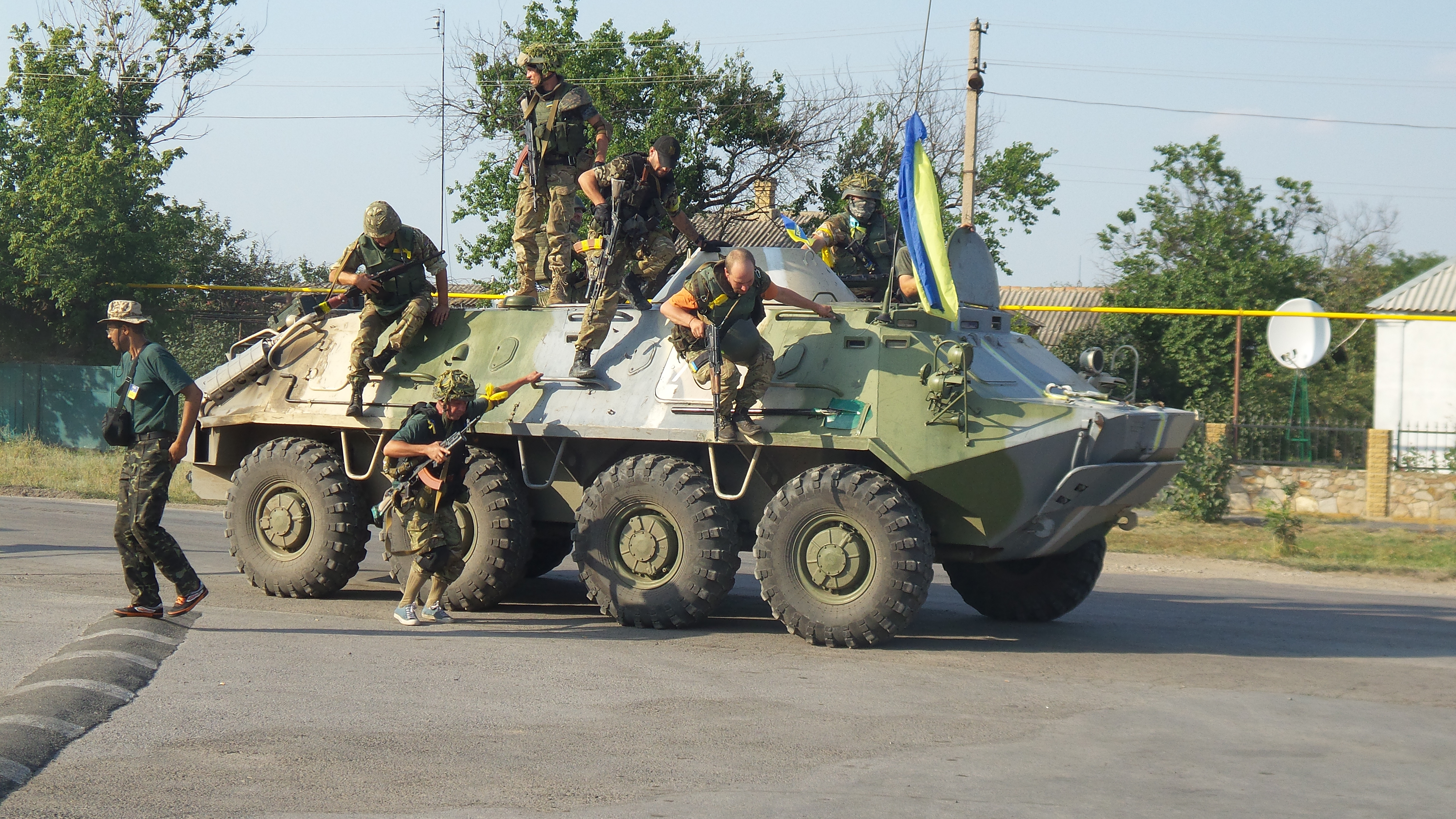
BTR-60PB used by the Ukrainian Donbas Battalion in Donetsk Oblast in August 2014

- Ukraine − 130 BTR-60, BTR-70, BTR-80 in service with the Ground Forces, while the Marines operate an unknown number of BTR-60s as of 2024 On 17 February 2025, the 156th Mechanized Brigade (Ukraine) received some 100 BTR-60Ds from Bulgaria. Overhauled and modernised they received new engines, radios, optics and anti-drone netting.
- Uzbekistan − 24 BTR-60 as of 2024
- Vietnam − 1,100 BTR-40, BTR-60, and BTR-152 in service as of 2024
- Yemen − Unknown number in service as of 2024
  - Houthis − Unknown number in service as of 2024
- Zambia − 13 as of 2024

=== Former ===
- Afghanistan
- Angola − 120 BTR-60 and BTR-152 in 2011
- Croatia − 16 TAB-71s captured from JNA and later scrapped. In 1998 there were 17 MT-LBs, BOVs and LOV variants in service with the Croatian army and BTR-60s in service with the police
- Belarus − 188 in 2011
- China − Captured 4 BTR-60PBs from the Soviet Union during the Sino-Soviet border conflict in March 1969. Produced and operated a small number of copies designed through reverse engineering
- Czechoslovakia − Specialized variants in 1990
- East Germany
- Estonia − 1 in 2011
- Finland − 96 in 2011
- Georgia: 3 BTR-60s and BTR-70s used in War in Abkhazia (1992–1993). 1 BTR-60 in service in 2008
- Germany − 726 in storage in 1994, former East German vehicles
- Grenada − 6 BTR-60PBs were ordered in 1981 from the Soviet Union and delivered in 1982 (the vehicles were probably previously in Soviet service). Captured by US forces during the United States invasion of Grenada
- Hungary
- India
- Iraq
- Israel − Captured a number from Egypt or Syria. By 1990 they were all in reserve
- Lebanon − 18 BTR-60PBs delivered by Iraq to the Lebanese Forces between 1986 and 1989. 10 BTR-60PBs delivered by Israel to the South Lebanon Army in 1982. Unknown number of vehicles delivered by Syria and Libya to the Druze People's Liberation Army militia between 1983 and 1987
- Liberia: 8 TAB-71s ordered in 1986 from Romania and delivered in 1987 (the vehicles were previously in Romanian service, part of a deal worth $4 million)
- Libya − 750 BTR-50 and BTR-60 in 2011

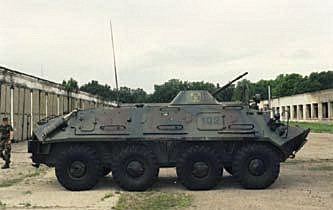
BTR-60PB in Lithuanian army service.

- Lithuania − 15 in 1994
- North Yemen: 150 BTR-60PBs were ordered in 1979 from the Soviet Union and delivered in 1980 (the vehicles were probably previously in Soviet service)
- Peru − 12 in 2011
- Poland − Specialized variants in 1990

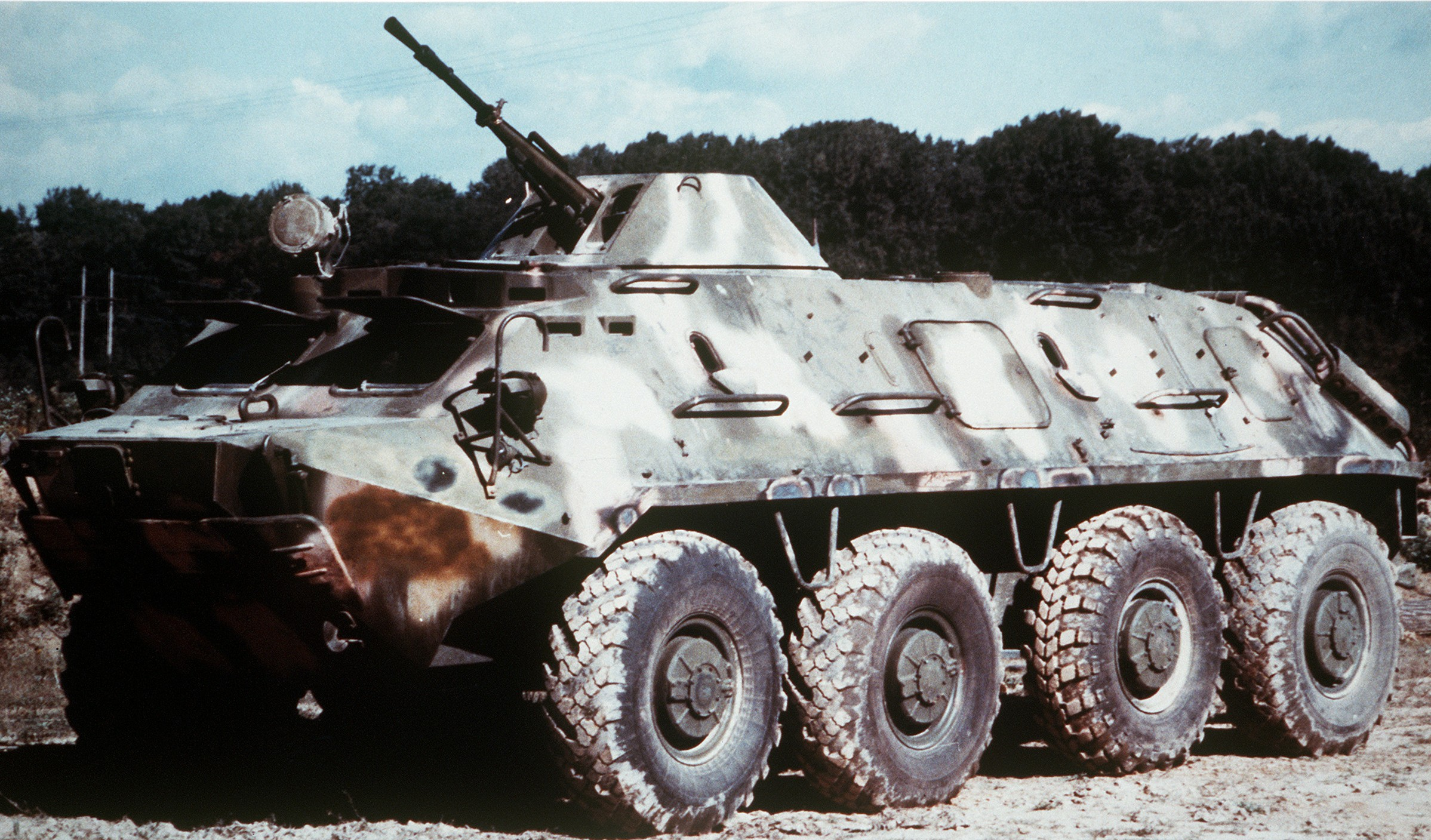
A Somali National Army BTR-60 armoured personnel carrier.

- Saudi Arabia – 140 BTR-60Ps were in use by Royal Saudi Navy marines as of 1997.
- Somalia
- South Yemen − 100 BTR-60PBs were ordered in 1981 from the Soviet Union and delivered between 1981 and 1982 (the vehicles were probably previously in Soviet service). 40 BTR-60PBs were ordered in 1986 from the Soviet Union and delivered in 1986 (the vehicles were probably previously in Soviet service)
- Soviet Union
- Sudan
- Turkey − 535 BTR-60 and BTR-80 in 2011. As of 2024, all are phased out of Turkish Armed Forces service, used only by Gendarmerie General Command
- United States − Captured vehicles during the American invasion of Grenada were used for OPFOR exercises
- Yugoslavia
- Zaire

== See also ==
- OT-64 SKOT – Polish/Czechoslovak equivalent to the Soviet BTR-60
- BTR-70 – Successor to the BTR-60
- BTR-80
- BTR-90

== Bibliography ==
- Karpenko, A. V. (1996). Obozreniye Bronetankovoj Tekhniki (1905–1995 gg.) (in Russian). Saint Petersburg: Nevskij Bastion.
- Abi-Chahine, Bassel (2019). The People's Liberation Army through the eyes of a lens, 1975–1991. Jdeideh (Beirut): Éditions Dergham. ISBN 978-614-459-033-1.
- Foss, Christopher F., ed. (1990). Jane's Armour and Artillery 1990-91 (11th ed.). Jane's Information Group. ISBN 978-0-7106-0909-0.
- Foss, Christopher F., ed. (2011). Jane's Armour and Artillery 2011-2012. Jane's Information Group. ISBN 978-0-7106-2960-9.
- High, Gil (June 1998). "Postmarks From Army Posts Around the World". Soldiers. 53 (6). Department of the Army: 26–27.
- Hull, A.W.; Markov, D.R.; Zaloga, S.J. (1999). Soviet/Russian Armor and Artillery Design Practices: 1945 to Present. Darlington, MD: Darlington Productions. ISBN 1-892848-01-5.
- International Institute for Strategic Studies (1994). The Military Balance 1994-1995. ISBN 978-1-85753-115-2.
- International Institute for Strategic Studies (2008). The Military Balance 2008. Routledge. ISBN 978-1-85743-461-3.
- International Institute for Strategic Studies (2024). The Military Balance 2024. Taylor & Francis. ISBN 978-1-040-05115-3.
- Kassis, Samer (2003). 30 Years of Military Vehicles in Lebanon. Beirut: Elite Group. ISBN 9953-0-0705-5.
- Sex, Zachary; Abi-Chahine, Bassel (2021). Modern Conflicts 2 – The Lebanese Civil War, From 1975 to 1991 and Beyond. Modern Conflicts Profile Guide. Vol. II. AK Interactive. EAN 8435568306073.
