= Israel Defense Forces History Museum =

Military museum in Tel Aviv, Israel

Coordinates: 32°03′34″N 34°45′45″E

- בתי האוסף
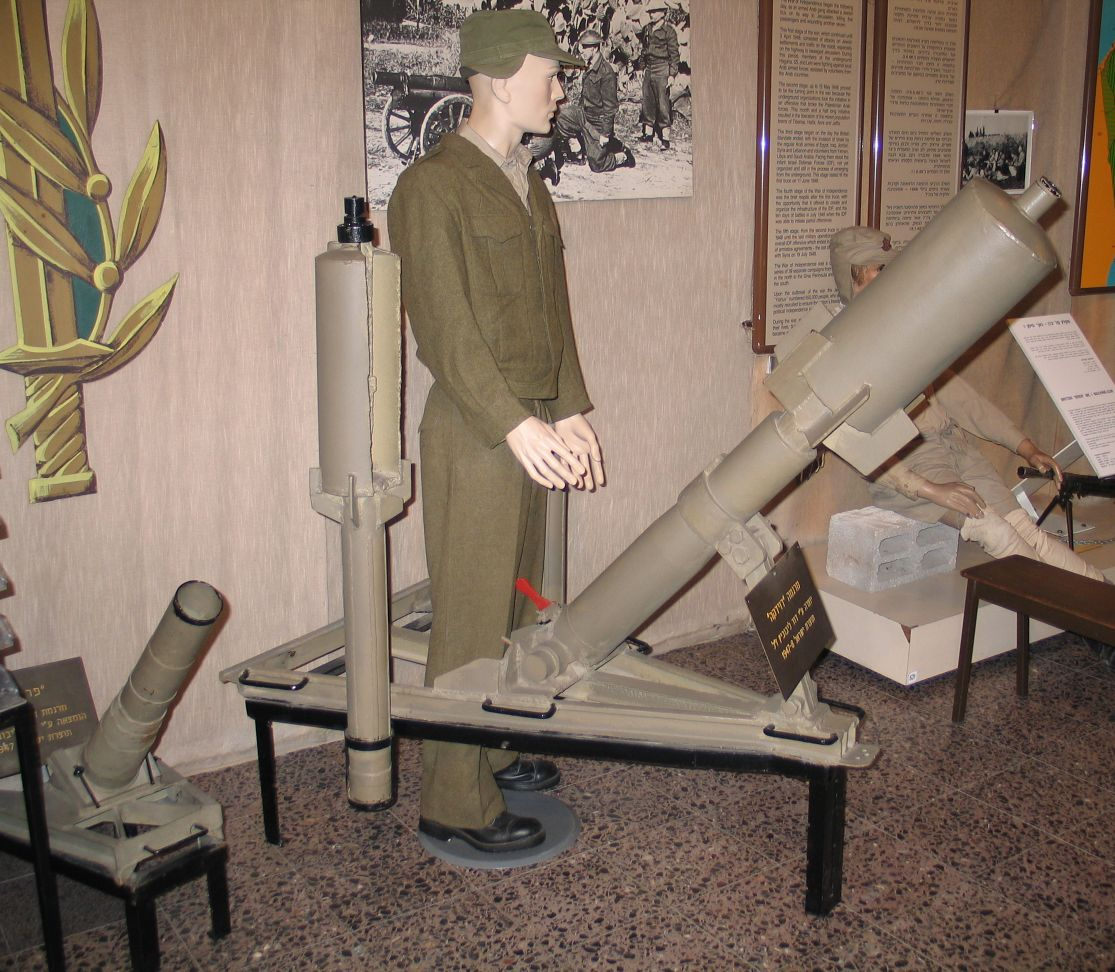
- The Davidka
- Location: Formerly in southern Tel Aviv, relocating to Latrun
- Type: Military History
- Collections: Military artifacts from the British Mandate to modern IDF

The Israel Defense Forces History Museum (Hebrew: בתי האוסף, Batei HaOsef, lit. The Collection Houses) is a museum dedicated to the history of Israel's military, from the underground organizations active during the British Mandate for Palestine to the modern Israel Defense Forces. The museum was built in southern Tel Aviv, next to the Jaffa Railway Station.

As of January 1, 2019, the museum is closed while it's being relocated to Latrun and is expected to reopen in 2021. The museum grounds were vacated by the Ministry of Defense in August 2019.
