= BTR (vehicle) =

Type of Soviet or post-Soviet military armoured personnel carrier

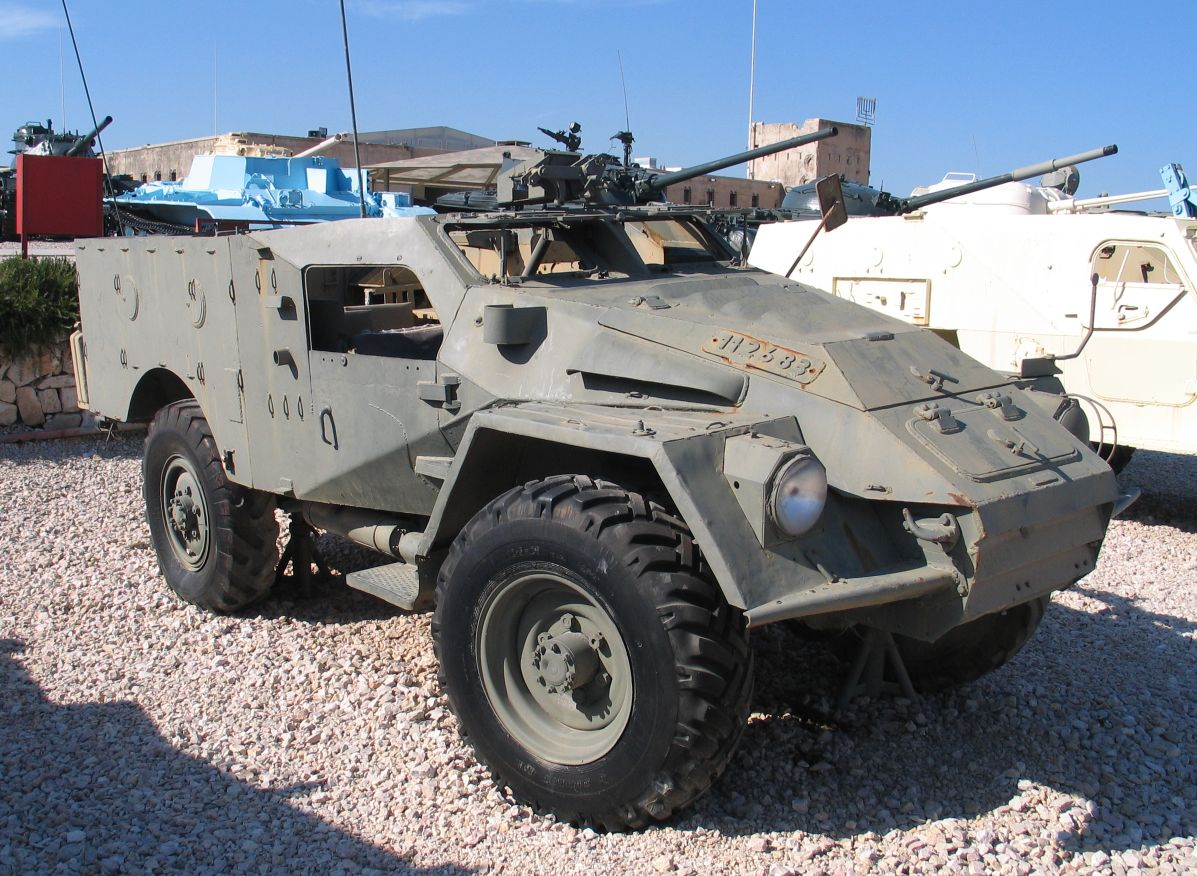
BTR-40 APC in Yad la-Shiryon Museum, Israel, 2005

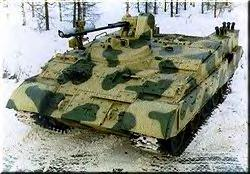
Russian BTR-T

BTR (Russian: БТР), from Bronetransportyor/Bronetransporter (Russian: бронетранспортёр/Ukrainian: бронетранспортер, lit. 'armoured transporter'), is any of a series of Soviet or post-Soviet military armoured personnel carriers (APCs).

== List of BTRs ==
=== Soviet Union ===
- BTR-40 – Armoured 4×4 truck (1950s) based on GAZ-63 four wheel drive truck.
  - BTR-40P – Another name for the BRDM-1.
  - BTR-40PB – Another name for the BRDM-2.
- BTR-50 – Tracked APC (1954) based on the PT-76 amphibious light tank chassis.
- BTR-60 – Eight-wheeled APC (1959).
- BTR-70 – Eight-wheeled APC (1972).
- BTR-80 – Eight-wheeled APC (1986).
- BTR-152 – Armoured 6×6 truck (1950s) based on the ZIS-151, with later variants using the ZIL-157 truck.
- BTR-D – Bronetransportyor, Desanta (Russian: Бронетранспортёр Десанта, literally "armoured transporter of the Airborne"), stretched six-wheel transport variant of the BMD-1 airborne IFV.
- BTR-MD "Rakushka" – APC variant of the BMD-3. Planned successor for the BTR-D.

=== Russia ===
- BTR-90 – Russian eight-wheeled APC (1990s).
- BTR-T – Russian tracked infantry fighting vehicle based on the T-55 chassis (1990s).
- BTR-22 – Russian eight-wheeled APC first shown 2024

=== Ukraine ===
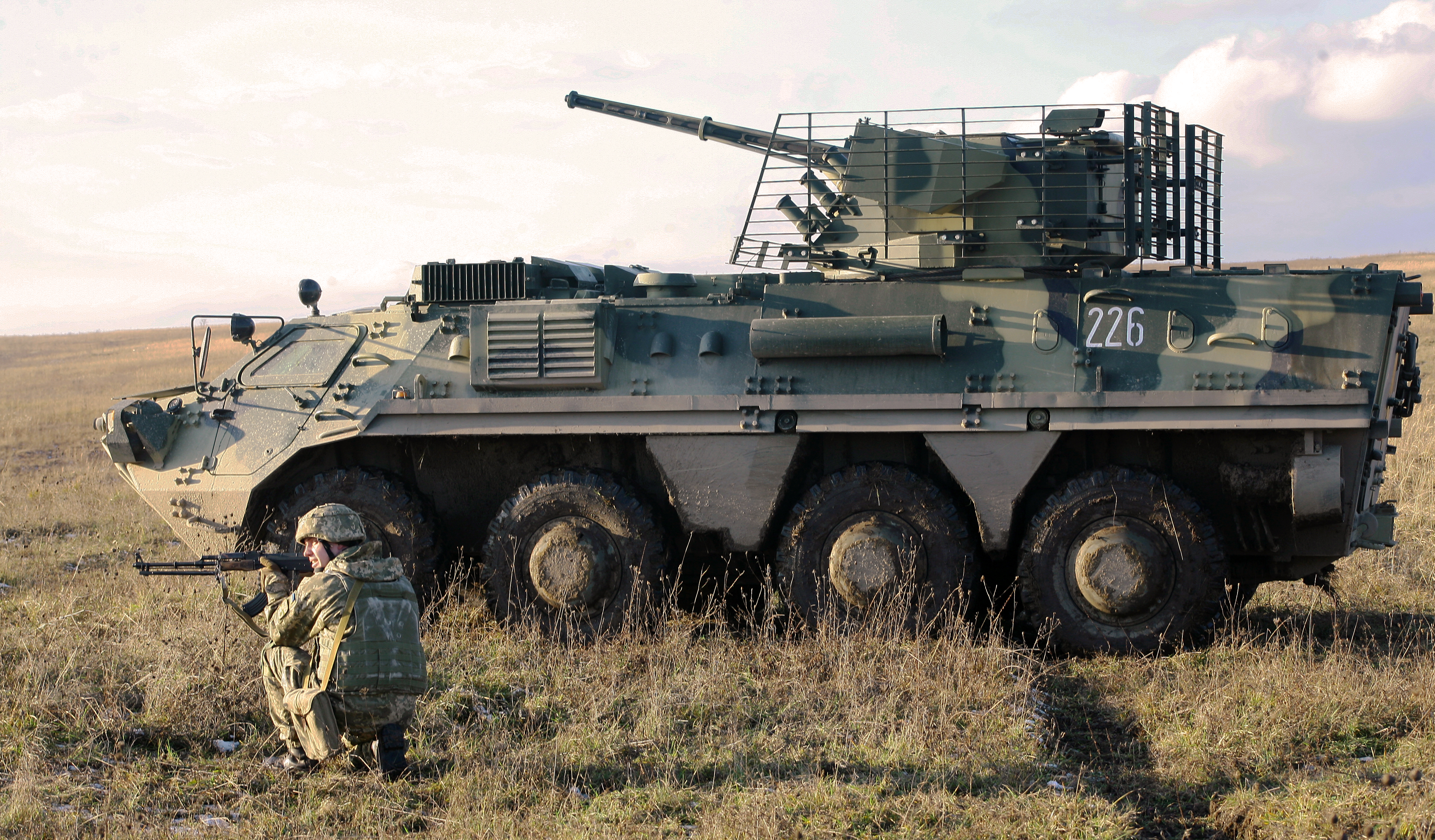
BTR-4 assigned to Ukrainian Armed Forces

- BTR-3 – Ukrainian BTR-80 variant eight-wheeled APC (2000). It is manufactured by KMDB in Ukraine. The BTR-3 is an all-new production vehicle, rather than an upgrade of the existing in-service vehicle, such as the BTR-80.
- BTR-4 – Another Ukrainian eight-wheeled APC (2006) with rear doors designed in Ukraine by the Kharkiv Morozov Machine Building Design Bureau (SOE KMDB) as a private venture. The prototype was unveiled at the Aviasvit 2006 exhibition held in Ukraine in June 2006.
- BTR-7 – an upgrade of the BTR-70.
- BTR-94 – Ukrainian modification of the Soviet eight-wheeled BTR-80.
