= BTR-94 =

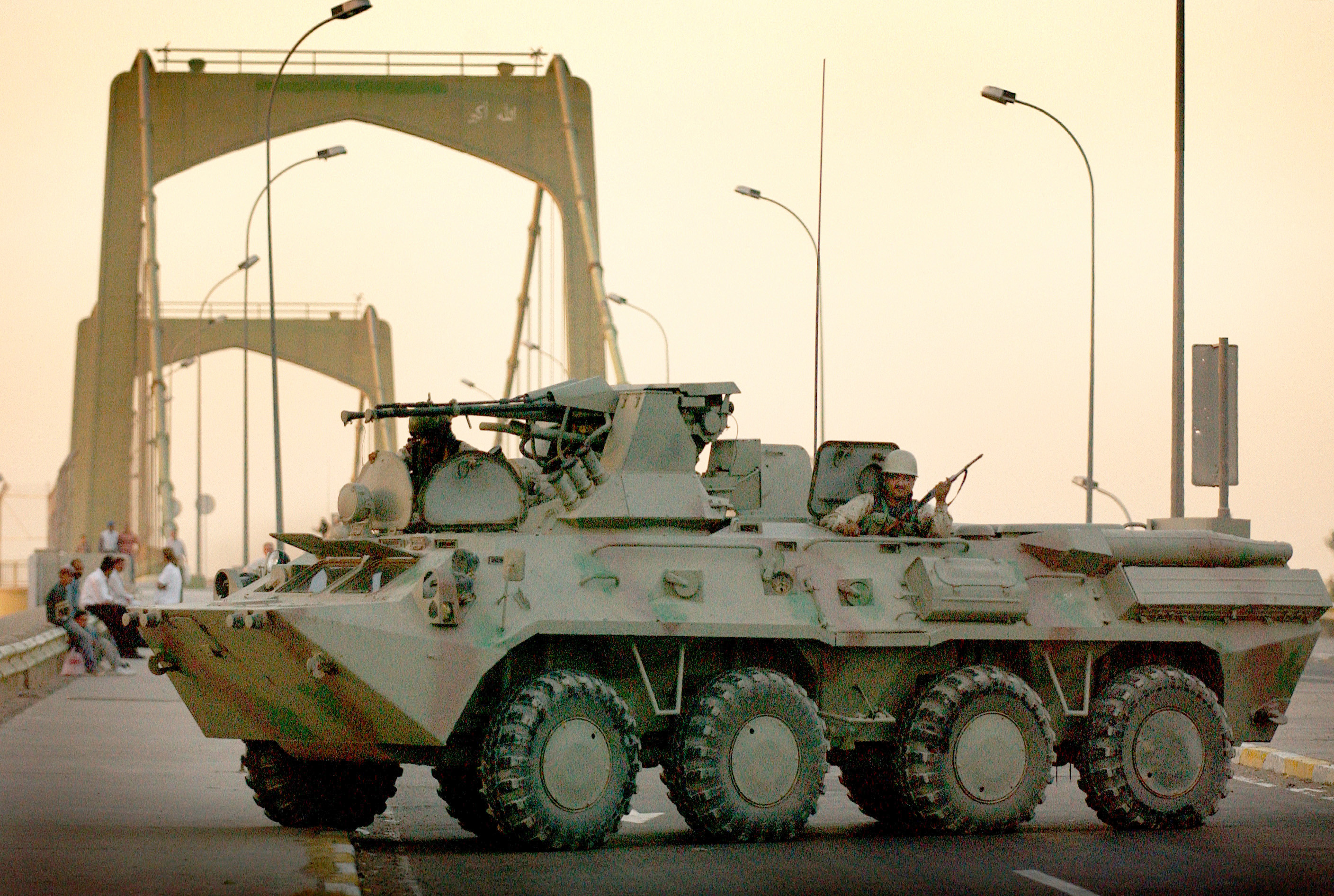
- Type: Armoured personnel carrier
- Place of origin: Ukraine

Service history
- Used by: Iraq
- Wars: Iraq War

Production history
- Designed: 1994–1997
- Manufacturer: Malyshev Factory
- Produced: 1999–2000
- No. built: 50

Specifications
- Mass: 13.6 tonnes
- Length: 7.65 m
- Width: 2.90 m
- Height: 2.80 m
- Crew: 3 +10 passengers
- Armor: Classified
- Main armament: twin 23x152mm 2A7M cannon
- Secondary armament: 7.62 mm PKT machine gun
- Engine: diesel engine 300 hp
- Suspension: wheeled 8×8
- Ground clearance: 475 mm
- Fuel capacity: 300 litres
- Operational range: 600 km
- Maximum speed: 85 km/h, 9 km/h swim

The BTR-94 is a Ukrainian amphibious armoured personnel carrier (Bronetransporter), a modification of the Soviet eight-wheeled BTR-80.

== Description ==
The BTR-94's turret BAU-23x2 is larger than the BTR-80's BPU-1. It is fitted with a twin 23x152mm gun 2A7M with 200 rounds, a coaxial KT-7.62 machine gun with 2,000 rounds, six 81 mm smoke grenade launchers and a combined 1PZ-7-23 optical sight.

Each 2A7M gun has a max. rate of fire of 850 rds/min. The same gun is mounted on the ZSU-23-4. The BAU-23x2 module can be mounted on other armoured vehicles like the BTR-70 or Ratel IFV.

== Operators ==
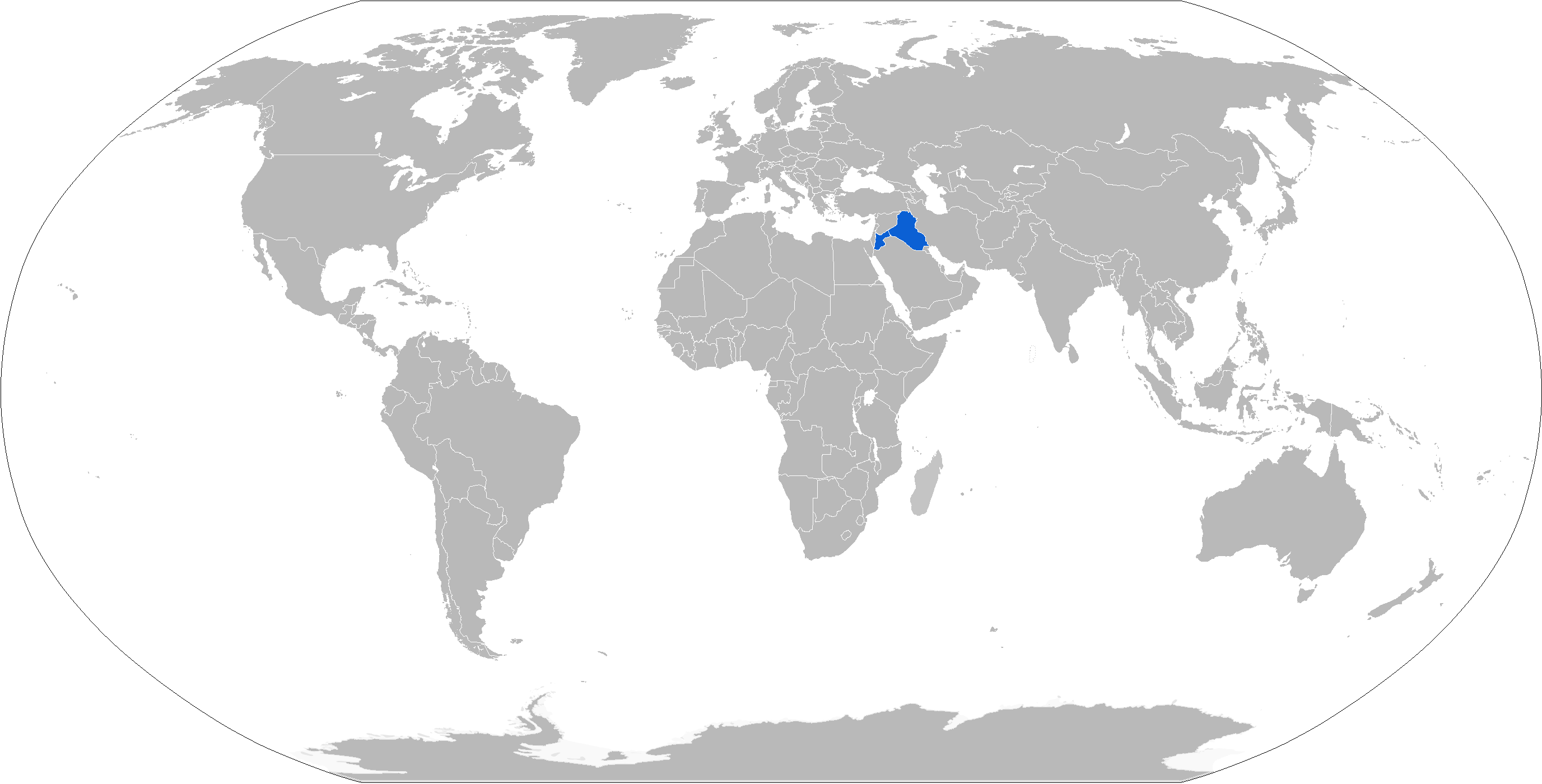
A map of BTR-94 operators in blue

=== Current operators ===
- Iraq - Iraq received 50 BTR-94s donated by Jordan in 2004 for use by the Mechanized Police Brigade.

=== Former operators ===
- Jordan - Jordan ordered 50 BTR-94s in 1999, the last vehicles were delivered in February 2000.

== See also ==
- BTR-152
- BTR-60, BTR-70, BTR-80, BTR-90, BTR-3, BTR-4
