= BTR-4 =

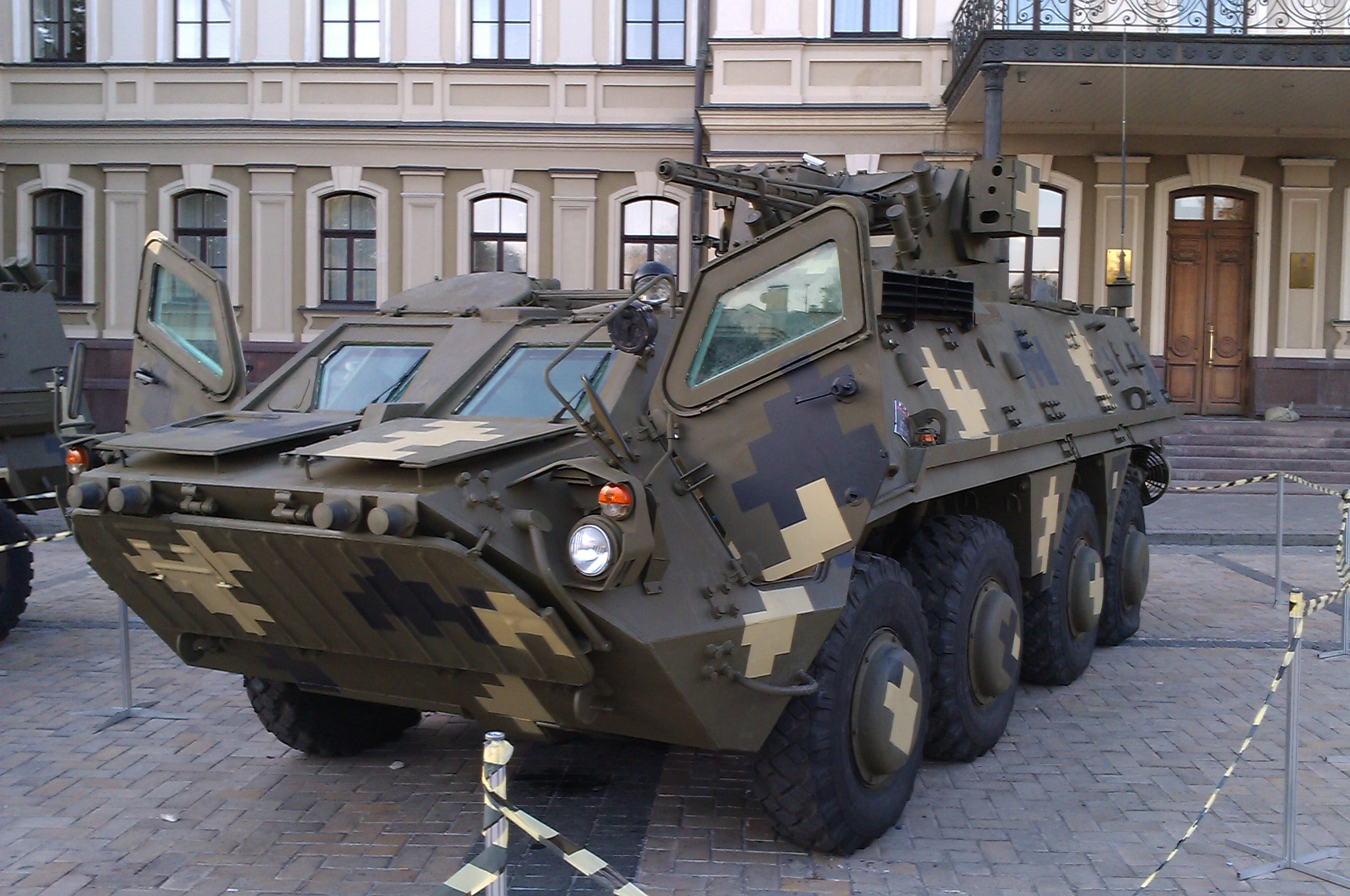
- BTR-4E
- Type: Infantry fighting vehicle
- Place of origin: Ukraine

Service history
- In service: 2009–present
- Used by: See Operators
- Wars: Boko Haram insurgency; War against the Islamic State; Russo-Ukrainian War; Russo-Ukrainian war

Production history
- Designer: Kharkiv Morozov Machine Building Design Bureau
- Manufacturer: Kharkiv Morozov Machine Building Design Bureau

Specifications
- Mass: 17.5+3 t (with anti-bullet protection); 25+3 t (with additional protection)
- Length: 7.76 m (25.5 ft)
- Width: 2.93 m (9.6 ft)
- Height: 3.02 m (9.9 ft)
- Crew: 3 crew; 8 passengers
- Armor: Welded steel
- Main armament: 2A72 30 mm (1.2 in) autocannon
- Secondary armament: 7.62 mm (0.300 in) coaxial machine gun; x4 anti-tank missiles OR; x2 anti-tank missiles and 30 mm (1.2 in) automatic grenade launcher
- Engine: 3TD diesel engine or DEUTZ EURO III; 489 hp or 598
- Power/weight: 28.6 hp/t (with anti-bullet protection); 20 hp/t (with additional protection)
- Suspension: wheeled 8×8
- Operational range: at least 690 km (430 mi)
- Maximum speed: 110 km/h (68 mph) (road); 10 km/h (6.2 mph) (in water)

The BTR-4 "Bucephalus" (Ukrainian: БТР-4 «Буцефал», romanized: Butsefal, abbreviation of Бронетранспортер, Bronetransporter, 'armoured transporter') is an amphibious 8×8 wheeled infantry fighting vehicle (IFV) designed in Ukraine by the Kharkiv Morozov Machine Building Design Bureau (SOE KMDB).

They have seen action in the War against the Islamic State during the capture of Jurf al-Nasr and Ar-Rutbah from ISIL and in the Russo-Ukrainian War.

== History ==
The prototype, which was designed as a private venture, was unveiled at the Aviasvit 2006 exhibition held in Kyiv in June 2006. A serial production started in late 2008. The first series of ten BTRs entered service with the army of Ukraine in 2009. In 2009, the BTR-4 was presented as a candidate for replacing the Pegaso BMR as the next infantry combat vehicle of the Spanish Army.

In 2012, the Iraqi Ministry of Defence ordered 420 Ukrainian BTR-4E IFVs. However, only 88 vehicles were delivered from the order, as the Iraqi Ministry of Defense cancelled the contract due to quality issues. The Ukrainian army thus took over 52 BTR-4E IFVs originally intended for Iraq.

In April 2014, units of the National Guard of Ukraine received their first BTR-4E IFVs, and during late May and early June they were already involved in the siege of Sloviansk, which was liberated on 5 July 2014, with the separatists and Russians withdrawing to Donetsk. During the fighting at Sloviansk, soldiers praised the new BTR-4E, especially for its armour, mobility, and optics. Vehicles withstood enemy machine gun fire and RPGs, and the slat-armor and Kevlar layer also protected the crews from shrapnel. On October 4, 2014, separatists posted a photo of a captured Ukrainian BTR-4K, a commander's version of the BTR-4. The vehicle had a slat-armor and was repainted. It served with the Vostok Battalion, which was composed mainly of Russian GRU officers.

== Description ==
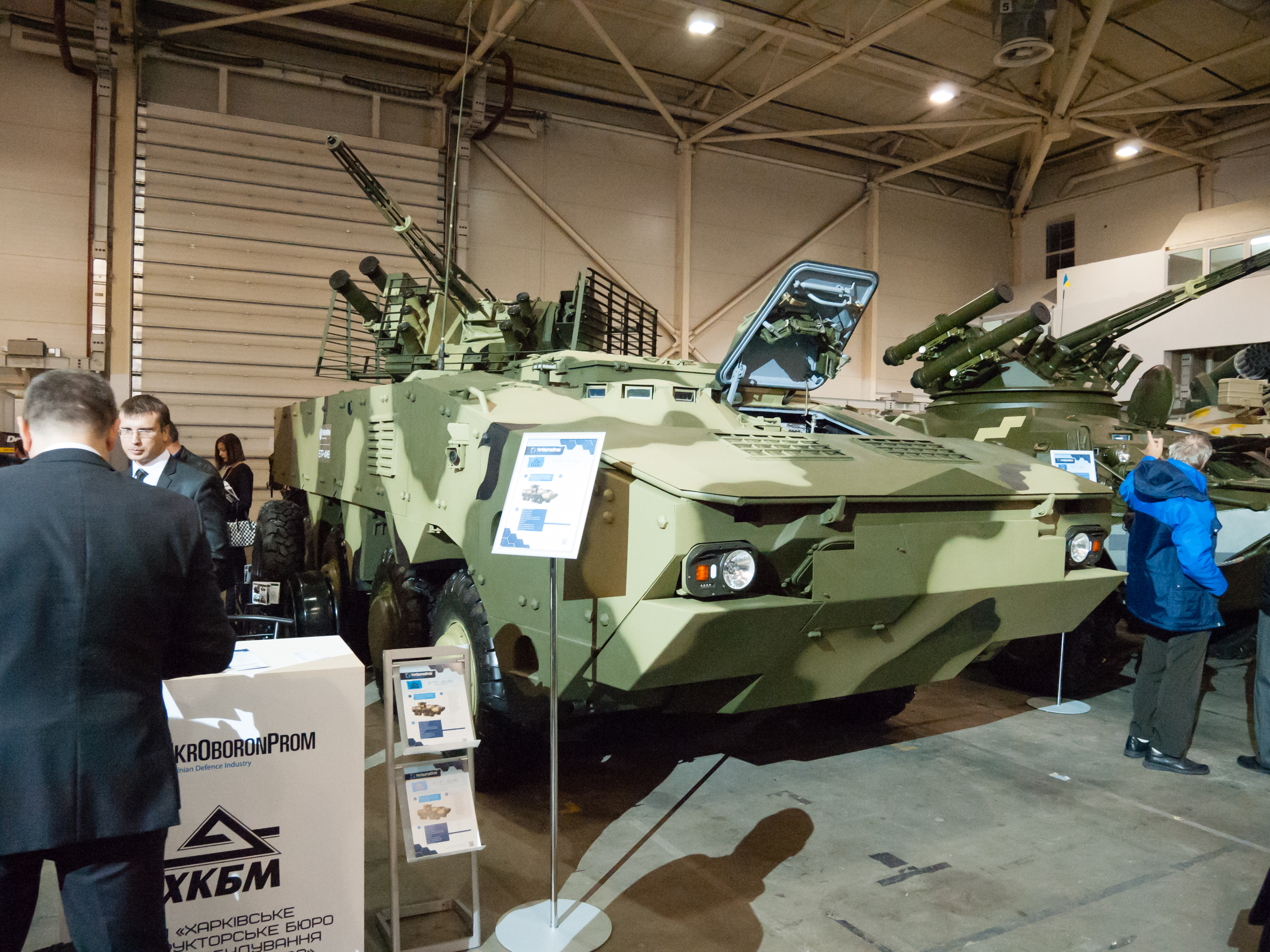
A BTR-4MV1

The layout of the BTR-4 represents a change from the older BTR-60/70/80s designed in the Soviet Union. The vehicle has a conventional layout similar to Western designs like the German TPz Fuchs with the driver's and commander's compartment at the front of the hull, the engine and transmission compartment in the middle, and the troop compartment at the rear. The troops enter and leave the vehicle either through the rear doors or the roof hatches, and the driver and the commander are provided with doors located on the sides of the hull.

The BTR-4 is a more flexible design than the older BTR-60/70/80s, as the altered layout makes it easier to adapt the vehicle to specialized roles. The vehicle can be armed according to customer requirements. The prototype is armed with the locally designed New Armament Module, which consists of one 30mm 2A72 automatic cannon, a 7.62mm coaxial machine-gun, up to four 9P135M Konkurs or Baryer anti-tank missiles (two on each side of the turret), and one 30mm automatic grenade launcher (fitted in place of the AT missiles on one left-hand side of the turret). It can be fitted with different turret weapons modules including the GROM module, PARUS module, SHTURM-M module, SHKVAL module, and the BAU 23x2 module.

The BTR-4 has a maximum speed of 110 km/h. It can cross water obstacles at a speed of 10 km/h. The vehicle is powered by a 3TD diesel engine with 500 hp. There are reports of vehicles being hit by several RPG rounds and multiple small-arms fire with no consequences. Slat armor can be fitted for maximum protection against RPG attacks.

Ukrainian state defense manufacturer UkrOboronProm has unveiled a prototype wheeled armored fighting vehicle that is presently known as the BTR-4MV1. The new BTR-4MV1 is the latest generation of 8×8 IFV. The BTR-4MV1 is designed in accordance with NATO standards. The vehicle is based on the BTR-4 but with many new improvements.

It differs from the previous versions mostly in a modified configuration of the vehicle's hull, which makes it possible to install additional types of protection (including the ceramic plates and explosive reactive armor) to reach the fourth and fifth protection levels in accordance with NATO standards. The hull rear is fitted with a ramp that not only enables troopers to enter and leave the vehicle much quicker, but also enables the armored personnel carrier to transport various large-size cargoes, including additional ammunition, spare parts, etc.

== Service history ==
Up to 750 vehicles have been produced for all operators.

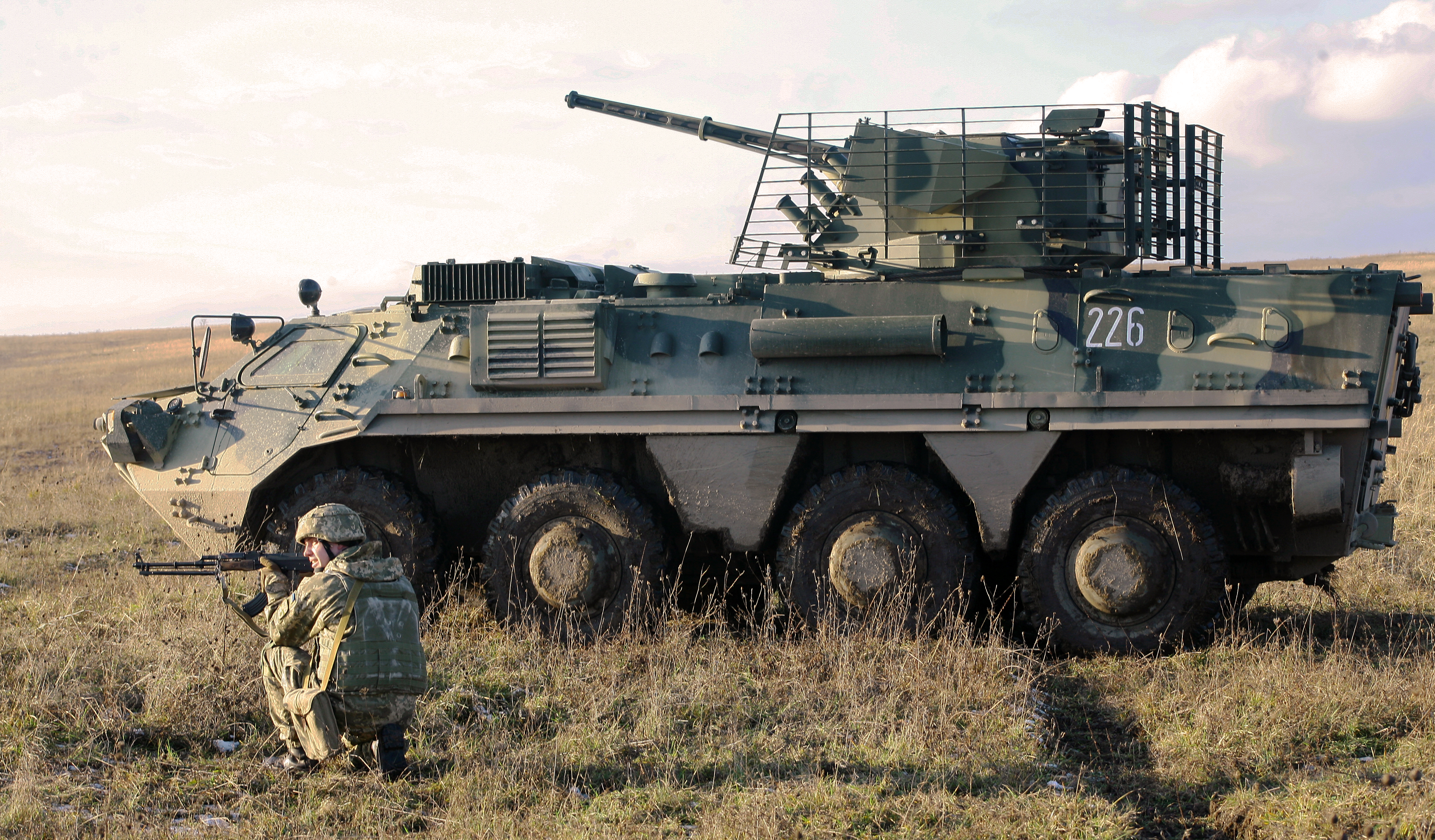
A BTR-4 assigned to 1st Battalion, 92nd Mechanized Brigade, Ukrainian Armed Forces

=== Indonesia ===
During early trials and evaluation by the Indonesian Marine Corps, the BTR-4 has successfully passed the trials in Indonesia. In April 2017, it was reported that the Indonesian Marine Corps had prepared a formal letter to withdraw from any further acquisitions of the BTR-4, though according to Ukroboronprom the news are part of informational warfare and black PR.

=== Iraq ===
Iraq has ordered 450 BTR-4s. 40 vehicles of the third batch delivered arrived with rust and damaged hulls and were not accepted by Iraq.

The Iraqi army used BTR-4s in an operation to recapture Jurf Al Sakhar from ISIL forces on 24 October 2014, successfully repelling two road-side ambushes.

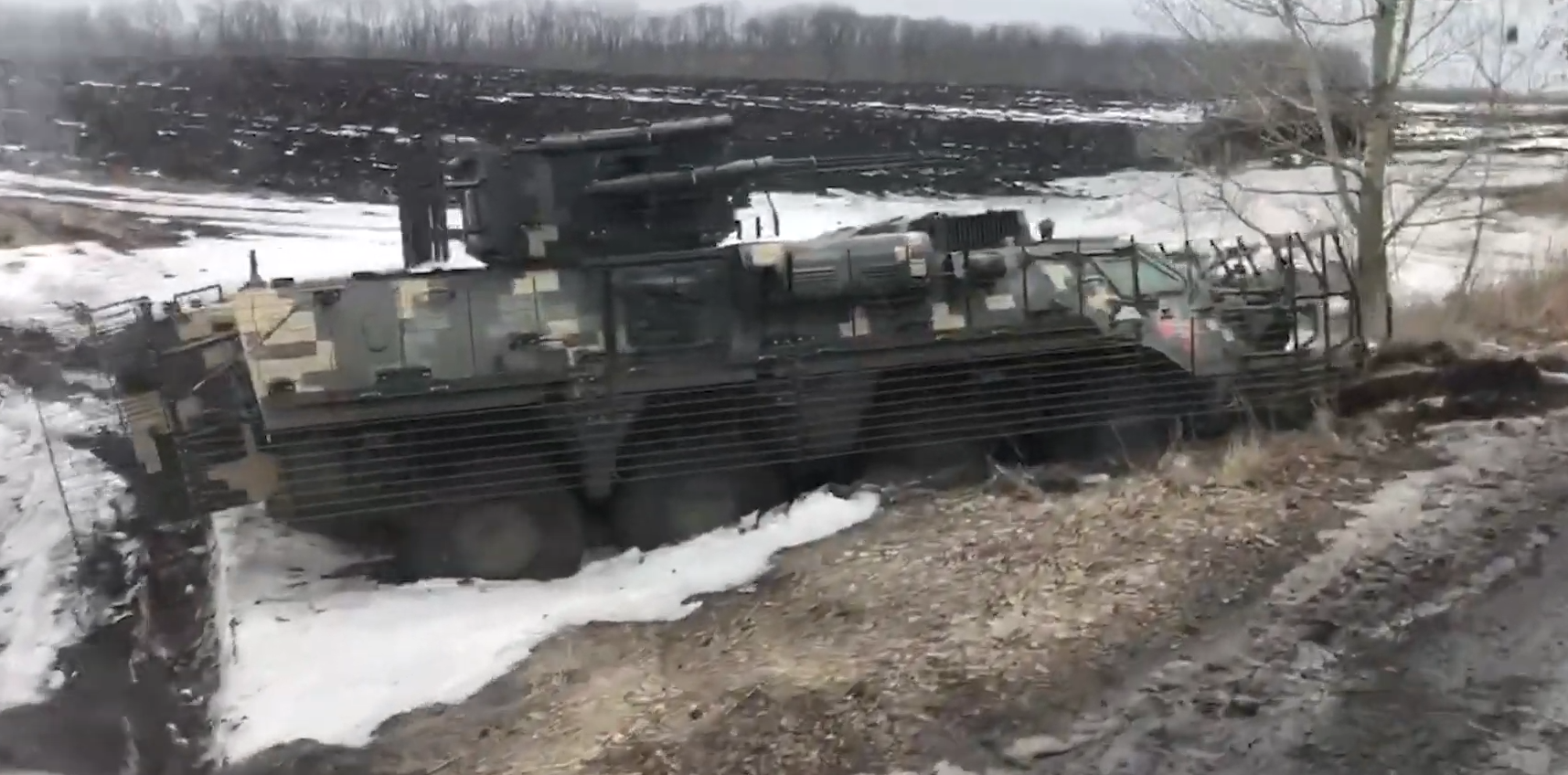
A Ukrainian BTR-4 lost during the Russian invasion of Ukraine

=== Nigeria ===
50 BTR-4s were delivered to the Nigerian Army in 2014.

=== Ukraine ===
Some BTR-4s that are being used by Ukrainian armed forces in the Russo-Ukrainian War come from the rejected batch for the Iraqi army.

In June 2014, company officials revealed that the BTR-4E was being used in military operations in the Sloviansk area. Its armor had withstood hits from large-caliber machine guns, counter-HEAT side screens protected the crew from anti-tank grenade launchers, and armored glass sustained direct hits from sniper rifles. Their original desert camo as seen on Iraqi BTR-4s can be viewed in pictures and videos from ATO operations. The BTR-4 continues to see use during the ongoing 2022 Russian invasion of Ukraine.

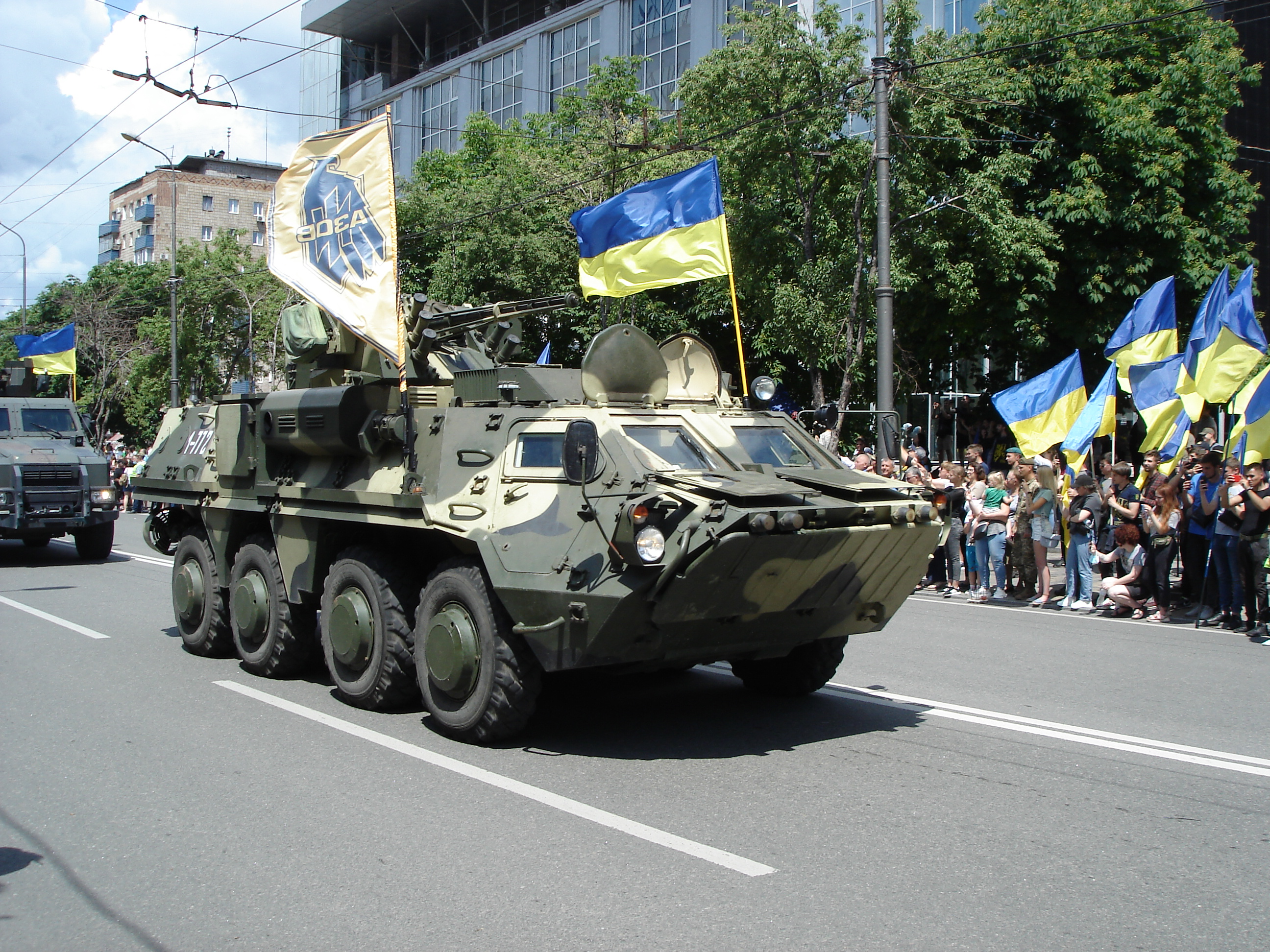
BTR-4 of the Azov Regiment

== Versions ==
BTR-4 is available in multiple different configurations:

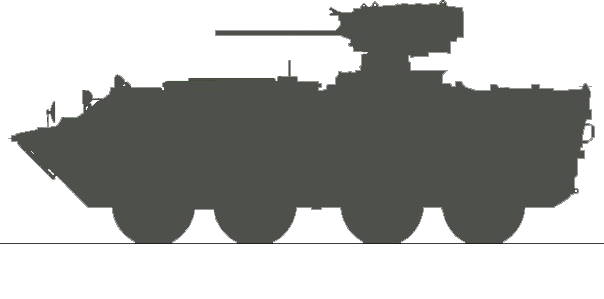
A BTR-4 with a Grom module

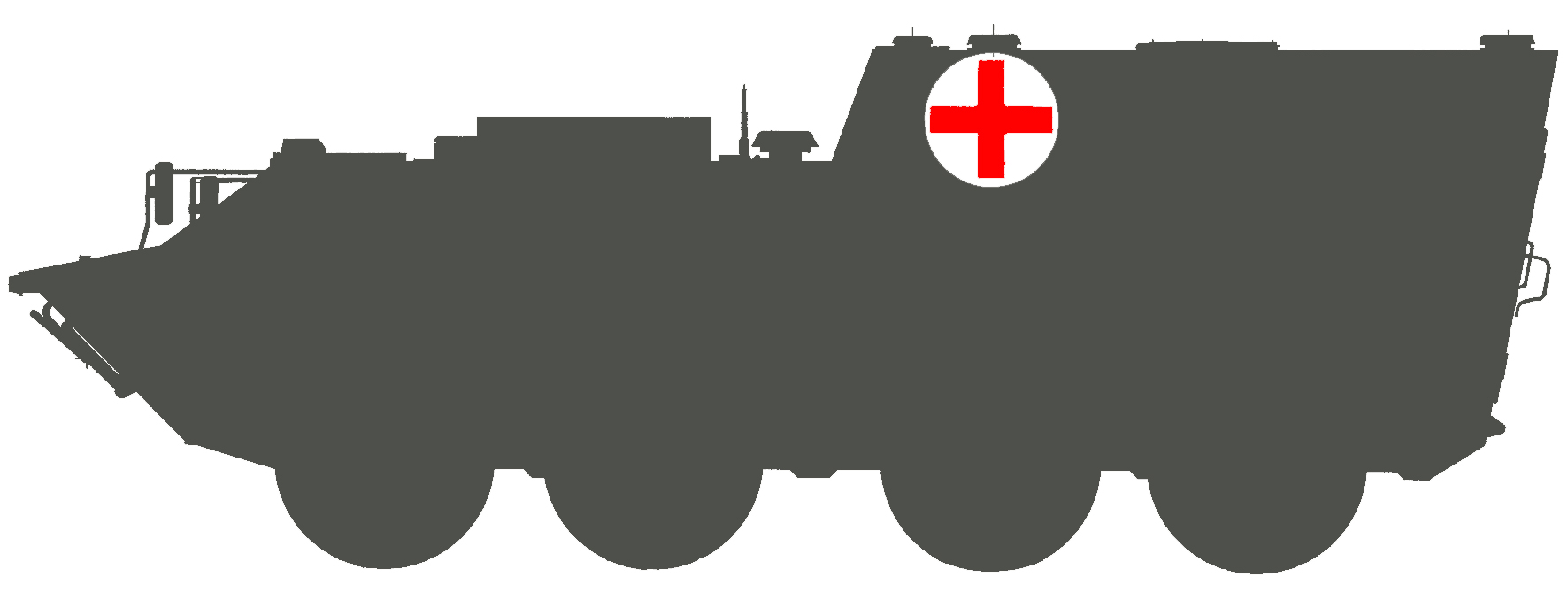
Retrieving And Medical Vehicle BSEM-4K

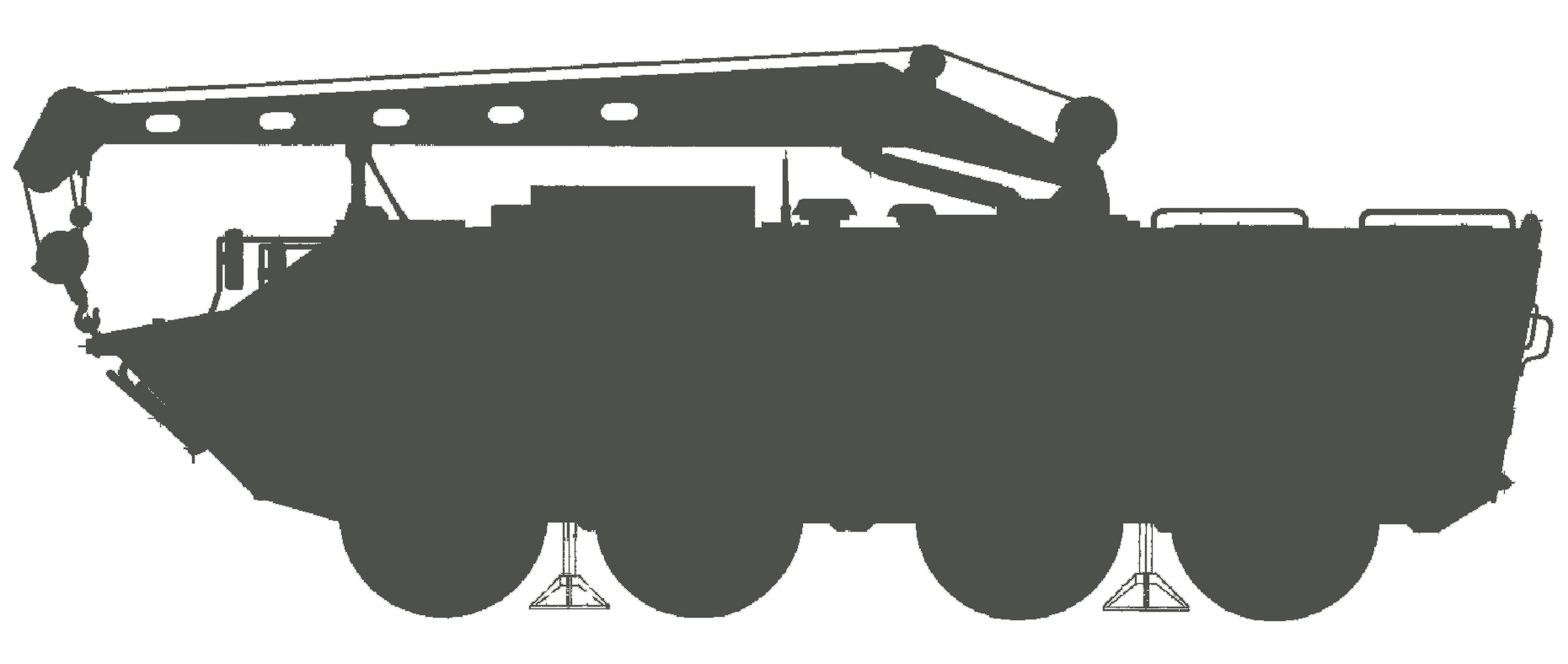
Repair and Recovery Vehicle BREM-4K

- BRM-4K - reconnaissance vehicle
- BTR-4CS-T - command vehicle designed for export to Thailand
- BTR-4K - command vehicle
- BTR-4KSh - command and staff vehicle
- BTR-4E1
- BTR-4EM - Myanmar version with a locally produced turret
- BTR-4MV
- BTR-4MV1 - upgraded to NATO standard with increased protection
- MOP-4K - fire support vehicle
- BREM-4K - repair and recovery vehicle
- BSEM-4K - recovery and medical vehicle
- BMM-4A - apparently similar in role to the BMM-1 (BTR-80 family) [first-aid and battlefield evacuation vehicle]
- BMM-4B - apparently similar in role to the BMM-2 (BTR-80 family) [battalion level initial medical treatment vehicle]
- BMM-4C - apparently similar in role to the BMM-3 (BTR-80 family) [field hospital]

== Weapons modules ==
Standard module:

- Passengers:
  - 3× crew (driver, commander, gunner)
  - 8× soldiers (7× soldiers in up-armored version)
- Armament:
  - 1× 30 mm 2A72 automatic cannon
  - 1× 7.62 mm coaxial machinegun
  - 4× 9P135M Konkurs or Baryer AT missiles (optional 1× 30 mm automatic grenade launcher with reduction to 2× AT missiles)

GROM module:

- Passengers:
  - 3× crew (driver, commander, gunner)
  - 8× soldiers
- Armament:
  - 1× 30 mm automatic cannon
  - 1× 30 mm automatic grenade launcher
  - 1× 7.62 mm coaxial machine gun
  - 4× 9P135M Konkurs or Baryer AT missiles

SHKVAL module:

- Passengers:
  - 3× crew (driver, commander, gunner)
  - 8× soldiers
- Armament:
  - 1× 30 mm automatic cannon
  - 1× 7.62 mm coaxial machine gun
  - 4× 9P135M Konkurs or Baryer AT missiles (optional 1× 30 mm automatic grenade launcher with reduction to 2× AT missiles)

BAU 23×2 module:

- Passengers:
  - 3× crew (driver, commander, gunner)
  - 8× soldiers
- Armament:
  - 2× 23×152 mm automatic cannons
  - 1× 7.62 mm coaxial machine gun

BTR-4KSh command and staff vehicle:

- Passengers:
  - 2× crew (driver, vehicle commander)
  - 5× staff (commander, four officers)
- Armament:
  - 1× TKB-01-1 12.7 mm machine gun

MOP-4K fire support vehicle:

- Passengers:
  - 4× crew (driver, commander, gunner, loader)
- Armament:
  - 1× 120 mm cannon
  - 1× 12.7 mm anti-aircraft machine gun (turret ring mount)

== Operators ==
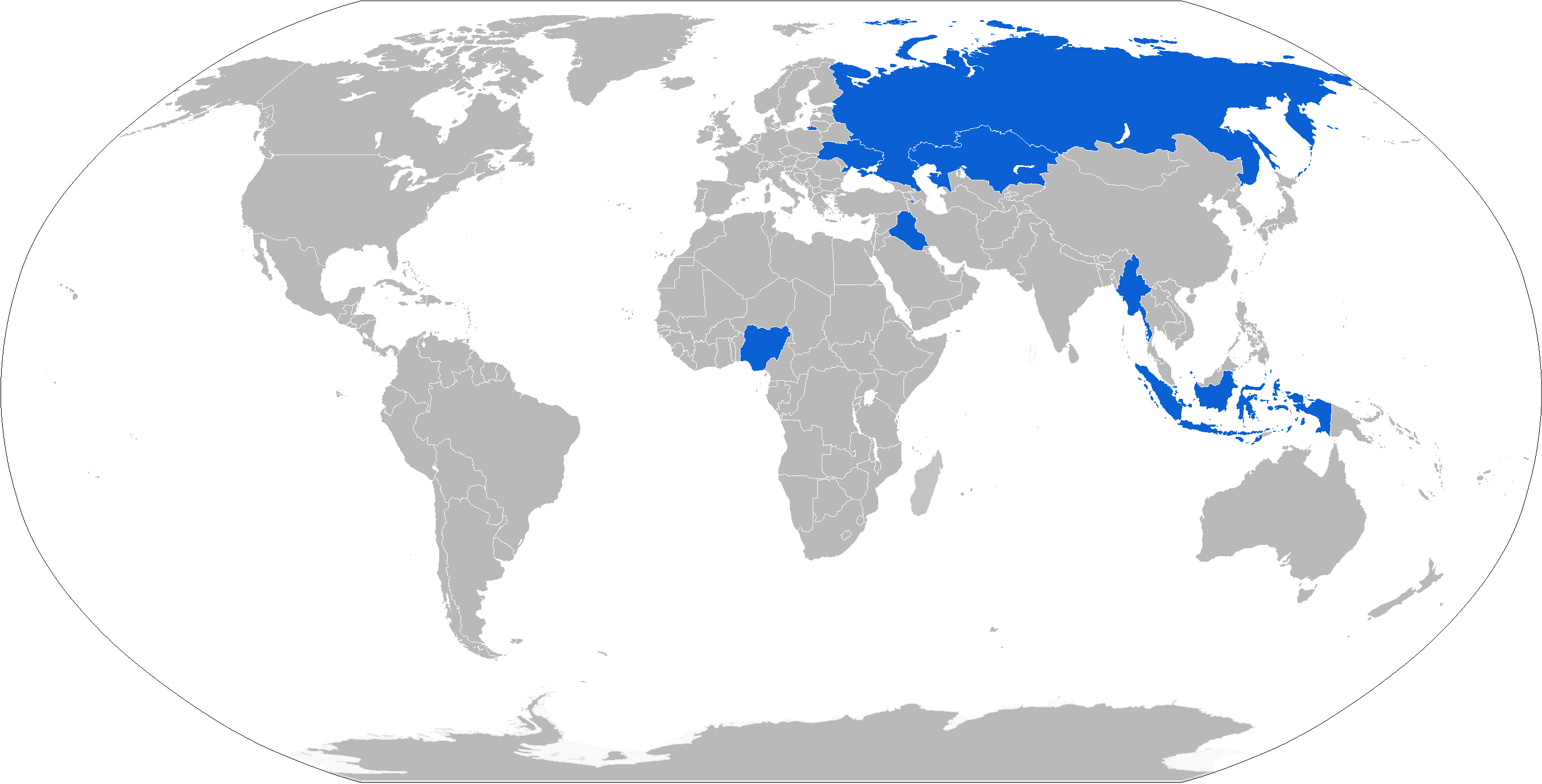
A map of BTR-4 operators in 2023

=== Current operators ===
- Indonesia — The Indonesian Marine Corps ordered 5 BTR-4M with two vehicles with the BM-7 "Parus" turret with a 30-mm ZTM-1 automatic gun and 3 with 7.62 mm RCWS and began operating them in May 2017. Subsequent orders for 55 vehicles were cancelled due to unsatisfactory performance. In April 2019, an order was made for 21 BT-3F and 22 BMP-3F vehicles instead.
- Iraq — The Iraqi Ministry of Defence ordered 420 vehicles in 2012. Only 88 out of an order for 420 were delivered by late 2013 and the contract has been canceled due to numerous quality violations. According to Ukraine the contract was resumed and as of September 2018 Iraq operates 270 vehicles.
- Nigeria — 5 BTR-4 for the Nigerian Police.
- Ukraine

- Armed Forces of Ukraine — Ukraine's Ministry of Defence made an initial order of 10 vehicles that entered service in 2009.105 BTR-4 and BTR-4E in service in Army and National Guards units.
- Ministry of Internal Affairs — since 25 March 2014, 10 vehicles were transferred to the recently reconstituted National Guard of Ukraine. There were 40 vehicles delivered to NGU until July 2014.

- Myanmar — In March 2019, a Ukrainian company and the Myanmar military signed a joint-venture agreement to build a plant capable of manufacturing armored personnel carriers (APCs) and self-propelled howitzers. The types of APCs that will be made in the plant are said to be eight-wheeled BTR-4E. Myanmar also revealed a new variant, the BTR-4EM, with a domestically designed and produced turret. 200+ are in service.
- Russia — As of 14 April 2025, at least 21 were captured by Russian forces during the Russian invasion of Ukraine according to Oryx.

=== Potential operators ===
- Republic of North Macedonia — The tender for the Republic of North Macedonia Ground Forces is for an infantry wheeled vehicle, for replacement of the current BTR-60 and BTR-70 fleet. The estimated order can reach 200 units.
- Thailand — The Royal Thai Marine Corps reportedly showed interest in the BTR-4MV1 in October 2018.

=== Captures ===
- Islamic State — 3 vehicles were seized by ISIL. 2 were captured from Iraqi Forces around October 2016 after ISIL conducted an offensive to retake the town of Ar-Rutbah where they were driven out. The other one was captured at an unknown location and date.
- ISWAP — In April 2021, ISWAP captured a BTR-4EN variant from soldiers of the Nigerian Army's "156 Battalion" during the Mainok attack where they conducted an assault on a military base located in Mainok.

== See also ==
- BTR-3 – (Ukraine)
- BTR-7 – (Ukraine)
- BTR-80 – (Soviet Union)
- BTR-90 – (Russia)
- BTR-94 – (Ukraine)
- Patria AMV – (Finland)
- Saur 2 – (Romania)
- Stryker – (United States, Canada)
- TPz Fuchs – (West Germany)
- VPK-7829 Bumerang – (Russia)
