= 2A42 Cobra =

Modular autocannon turret

The 2A42 Cobra is a modular one-man gun turret designed by the ZTS Dubnica nad Váhom design bureau. It is specially designed to fit many different types of tracked and wheeled IFVs and APCs such as the BMP-1, BTR-70, BTR-80 and the OT-64 SKOT.

== Description ==
A Cobra-K turret on a BMP-1.

The 2A42 Cobra is a one-man low profile turret with its main armament being the 30 mm 2A42 autocannon. It also has the 7.62mm PKT coaxial machine gun. The turret features a roof mounted, 9P135M ATGM launcher, which can fire both the 9M111 Fagot as well as the 9M113 Konkurs.

The turret weights 1.05 tonnes without the equipment. The equipment provided for the turret meets modern combat requirements for protection of both the crew and the transported troops. It also allows accurate fire in all weather conditions, both by day and at night and while the vehicle is on the move. The turret is able to successfully operate in temperatures ranging from −30 °C up to +50 °C. The turret can turn 360°, while the main gun and coaxial machine gun can be elevated or depressed, reaching maximums of −4° to+50°.

The turrets weapons are externally mounted. The interior of the turret provides complete electronic systems for operating the weapons along with ammunition stowage and a seat for the gunner. Controlling the weapons and moving the turret is accomplished by means of drive units with a manual backup if the electric system were to fail.

The weapons are controlled through the gunner's control panel.

The turret is equipped with the modernized Meopta BPK-2-42 periscopic sight with a swing of the mirror from −5° up to +60°. The sighting system is equipped with a night vision device.

The turret control system enables the crew to check the function of individual systems, aim at a target by day and at night, control drive units of both traverse of the turret and elevation of the main gun, stabilize the position of the turret and the main gun, control mounted weapons and control elevation/traverse drives and weapons through emergency manual mode if the electrical system was to fail.

The turret is equipped with fiber-glass linings, internal overpressure and a suite providing nuclear, biological and chemical weapons (NBC) protection. The armor plating provides protection against projectiles up to 14.5 mm caliber within the frontal arc and against projectiles up to 7.62 mm caliber fired at any point on the turret. The turret is also equipped with six 81 mm 902V "Tucha" smoke grenade launchers fitted to both sides of the turret providing the vehicle with the ability to lay its own smoke screen.

== Variants ==
=== Cobra-S ===
A variant of the 2A42 Cobra for the BMP-1.

=== Cobra-K ===
A variant of the 2A42 Cobra for the BTR-70, however, a slightly modified version of the Cobra-K was under development for the Pandur and Mowag Piranha.

== Operators ==
=== Current operators ===
Sudan
Sudanese Armed Forces - at least BMP-1 vehicles with Cobra-S turrets were shown off at a parade in Khartoum, Sudan in December 2007. Additionally, Belarus reported that the they had transferred two Cobra-equipped BTR-70s to Sudan also in December 2007.
