= BTR-22 =

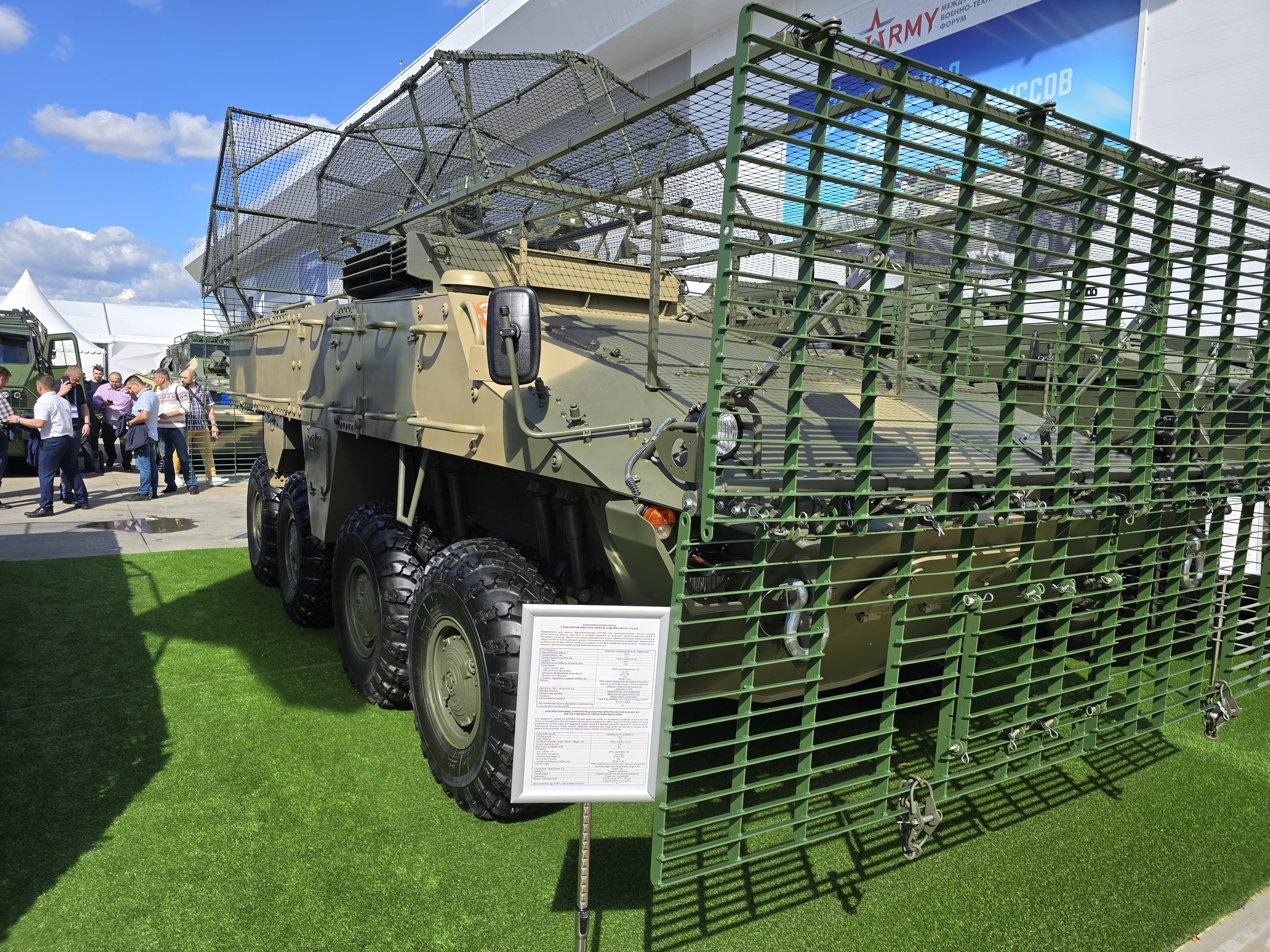
- BTR-22 on display during the Army-2024 International Military-Technical Forum
- Type: Armoured personnel carrier
- Place of origin: Russia

Production history
- Developed from: BTR-82A

Specifications
- Mass: 20 tonnes
- Length: 7.560 m
- Width: 5.070 m
- Height: 3.110 m
- Crew: 2 (+8 passengers)
- Main armament: 2A72 30 mm autocannon with 300 rounds of ammunition Ballista RCWS; 2A42 30 mm autocannon with 300 rounds of ammunition
- Secondary armament: PKTM 7.62×54mmR machine gun with 2,000 rounds of ammunition 6 × smoke grenade launchers Ballista RCWS; PKTM 7.62×54mmR machine gun with 2,000 rounds of ammunition 2 × 9M113 Konkurs ATGM; 6 × smoke grenade launchers
- Engine: YaMZ-536; 330 hp (250 kW)
- Suspension: 8×8 wheeled
- Operational range: 700 km (430 mi)
- Maximum speed: 85 km/h (53 mph) on road 10 km/h (6.2 mph) in water

The BTR-22 (Russian: бронетранспортёр, romanized: bronetransportyor, lit. 'armoured carrier') is an 8×8 amphibious armoured personnel carrier developed by the Military Industrial Company (VPK) of Russia. It was developed in the early 2010s as the BTR-82A(U), a heavily redesigned variant of the BTR-82A. The vehicle differs from its predecessor in its layout, moving the engine to the front of the hull, with troops disembarking from a rear ramp. The vehicle is positioned as a cost-effective alternative to the VPK-7829 Bumerang.

== Design ==
The BTR-22 departs from previous Soviet and Russian wheeled armoured vehicle designs such as the BTR-60, BTR-70 and BTR-80. Unlike previous vehicles which featured a rear mounted engine and egress doors mounted on the side of the hull, the engine of the vehicle is moved to the front of the hull, with troops dismounting through twin doors in the rear of the vehicle.

The BTR-22 retains the amphibious capabilities of its the BTR-82. For this purpose, the vehicle is equipped with hydrojets and a detachable wave breaker.

== Armament ==
The BTR-22 may be armed with the standard BPPU turret, or optionally the Ballista RCWS.

In its standard configuration, the BTR-22 is armed with a 30 mm 2A72 dual feeding autocannon as well as a PKTM 7.62x54mmR machine gun, in addition to six smoke grenade launchers.

The Ballista module features a 30 mm 2A42 dual feeding auto cannon, PKTM 7.62x54mmR machine gun, twin 9M113 Konkurs ATGM launchers and six smoke grenade launchers.

== See also ==
- VPK-7829 Bumerang (Russia)
- Amphibious Combat Vehicle (United States)
