= BTR-3 =

Eight-wheel drive armored personnel carrier

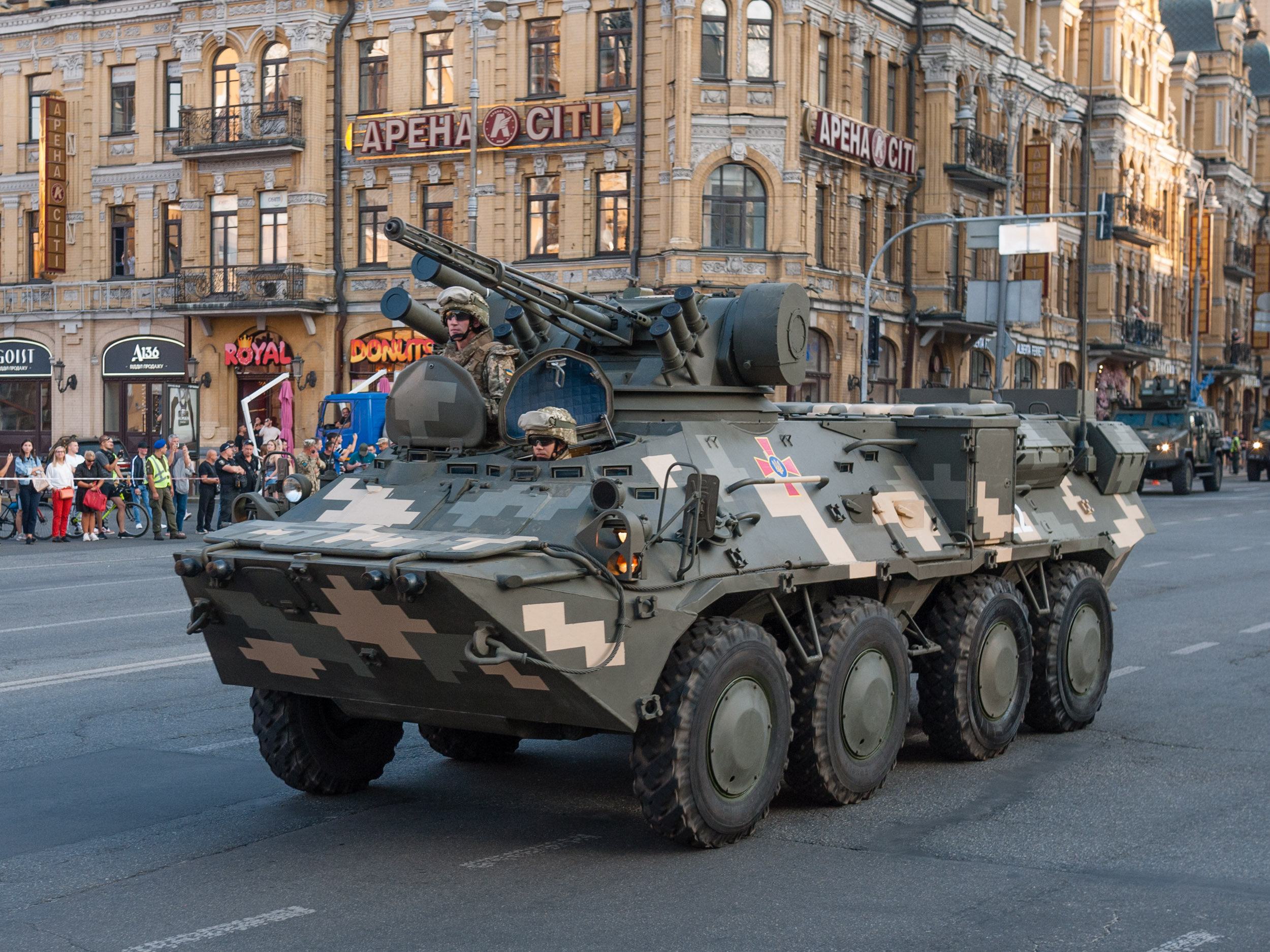
- Ukrainian BTR-3E1
- Type: Armored personnel carrier
- Place of origin: Ukraine

Service history
- In service: 2000–present
- Used by: Ukrainian Ground Forces; National Guard of Ukraine; Nigeria; Royal Thai Army; Myanmar Army
- Wars: War in Donbas; Internal conflict in Myanmar; 2020 Nagorno-Karabakh conflict Myanmar civil war (2021-present); Russian invasion of Ukraine; 2025 Cambodia–Thailand conflict

Production history
- Designed: 2000
- Manufacturer: Kharkiv Morozov Machine Building Design Bureau
- Produced: 2001
- Variants: See below

Specifications
- Mass: 16.4 tonnes
- Length: 7.65 m
- Width: 2.9 m
- Height: 2.8 m (including turret)
- Crew: 3 crew (+6 passengers)
- Armor: Welded steel
- Main armament: BM-3 Shturm or KBA-105 Shkval with 30 mm caliber ZTM-1 autocannon or Stiletto turret with 30mm ZTM-2 or 90mm Cockerill CSE 90LP
- Secondary armament: 7.62 mm
- Engine: Deutz AG; 326 hp
- Suspension: Wheeled 8×8
- Operational range: 600 km
- Maximum speed: 85 km/h

The BTR-3 is an eight-wheel drive armored personnel carrier developed in 2000 and 2001 by an international consortium. The companies involved in the project include the Kharkiv Morozov Machine Building Design Bureau of Ukraine, Adcom Systems of Abu-Dhabi, UAE, and the State Scientific Technical Centre of Artillery & Rifle Arms of Ukraine. Although somewhat similar in appearance to the Soviet BTR-80, the BTR-3U is an all-new production vehicle rather than an update of the existing in-service vehicle.

== Armament ==
The BTR-3U is fitted with the one-person KBA-105 "Shkval" unified fighting module which can accommodate a 30mm gun, 7.62mm coaxial machine gun, 30mm automatic grenade launcher and anti-tank guided weapons. This module was developed by the State Scientific Technical Centre of Artillery & Rifle Arms of Ukraine. The Shkval fighting module design is versatile, but can also be used with another turret.

- The Cockerill CSE 90LP with 90mm Cockerill LP
- The KBA-105 one person manned turret with 30 mm ZTM-1 dual-feed autocannon that has 350 rounds of ready-use ammunition or Stiletto turret with 30mm ZTM-2.
- A total of 2,500 rounds are carried for the 7.62mm coaxial machine gun.
- The 30 mm AGS-17D grenade launcher is mounted on the left side of the turret, having 29 rounds of ready-use ammunition, with additional 87 rounds being carried in reserve (three magazines, each containing 29 rounds).
- Cockerill CPWS 30 turret with 30mm autocannon.
- Six 81 mm electrically operated smoke/aerosol grenade launchers are mounted three either side of the turret rear and firing forwards.
- The sighting systems include a commander's 1PZ-3 observation periscope and a TKN-4S Agat stabilised sight which is integrated with the missile fire control system.

BTR-3DA has BM-3M Shturm-M weapon station armed with ZTM-1 30mm autocannon, KT-7,62 machine gun, KBA-117 30mm grenade launcher, six smoke grenade launchers 902B Tucha, and ATGM system, Barrier.

== Equipment design ==
The standard equipment of the BTR-3U also includes hydraulically amplified powered steering on the front four road wheels and a central tire-pressure regulation system that allows the driver to adjust the tire-pressure to suit the terrain being crossed. The BTR-3U is fitted with French Michelin tires.

The BTR-3U engine compartment consists of a Deutz BF6M1015 diesel developing 326 hp coupled to an Allison MD3066 fully automatic transmission. The power pack and transmission are fitted by the Kharkiv Morozov Machine Building Design Bureau with the technical assistance of the Deutz AG and the Allison Transmission companies. The engine compartment is fitted with an automatic double-action fire extinguishing system.

The vehicle is fully amphibious, propelled when afloat by a single water jet mounted at the rear of the hull. To prepare the vehicle for water, the driver erects a trim vane and switches on the bilge pumps from within the vehicle.

The troop compartment accommodates six soldiers who enter and leave the vehicle by a door in either side of the hull. The lower part of the door folds downward to form a step, with the upper part opening forwards. There are also hatches in the roof and firing ports with associated vision devices provided in the sides and front of the vehicle. An air conditioning system is fitted as standard to ensure crew comfort in hot conditions.

== Variants ==
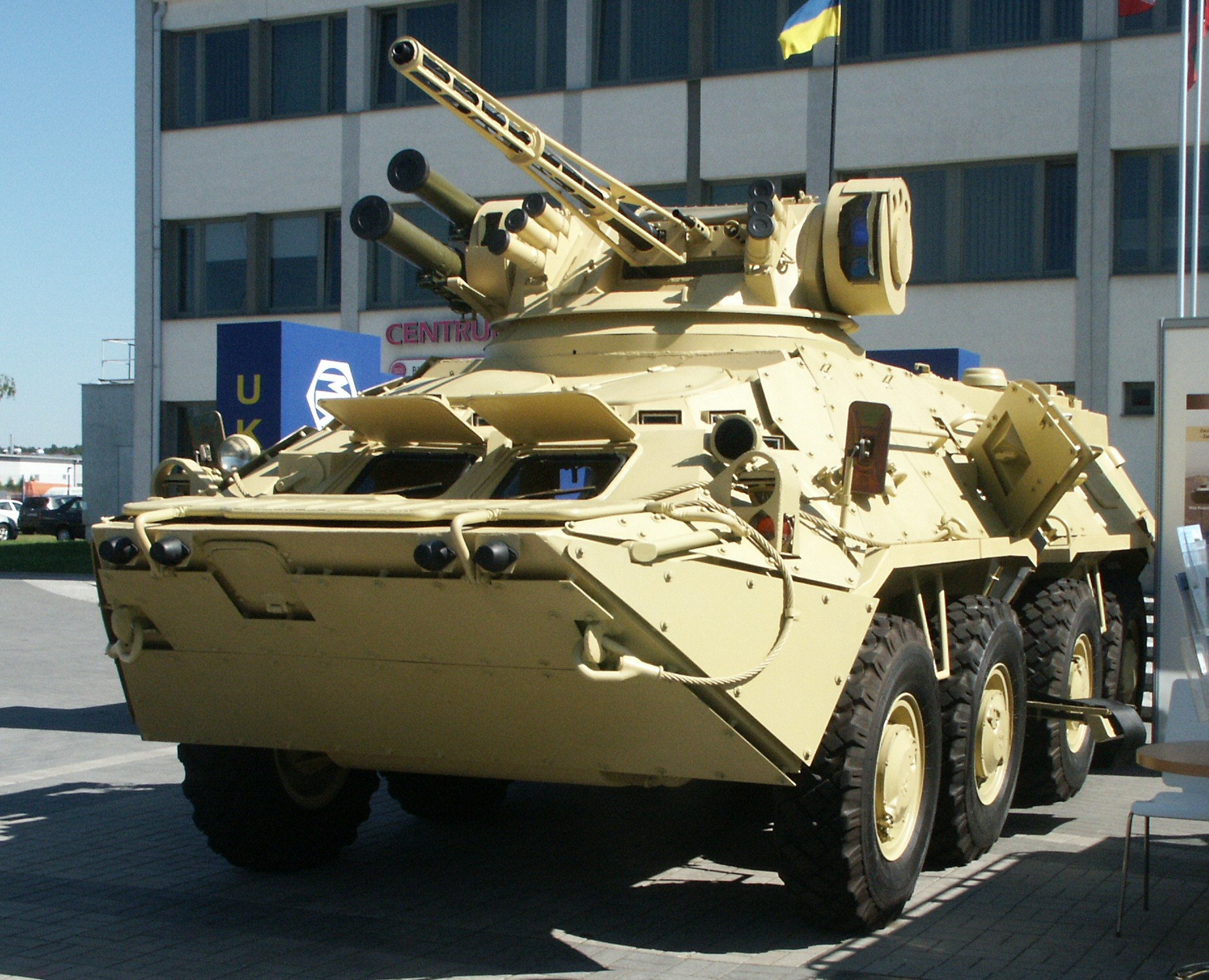
Ukrainian BTR-3E1M in desert camouflage

- BTR-3U "Hunter": initially known as BTR-94K. As described.
  - BTR-3U Guardian: version for UAE Marines with "Buran-N1" turret.
- BTR-3E: has a new UTD-20 engine.
  - BTR-3E1: latest version with BM-3 "Shturm" turret and new engine MTU 6R106TD21
  - BTR-3E1D: Improved version of the E1.
  - BTR-3E1K: command vehicle.
  - BTR-3E ARV: recovery vehicle with winch, crane and dozer blade.
  - BTR-3E 90: heavy fire support vehicle with 90mm Cockerill main gun.
  - BTR-3EU1: Special improved version developed for the Ukrainian military.
- BTR-3DA: upgraded version purchased by the Ukrainian armed forces in 2017. BTR-3DA is BM-3M Shturm-M weapon station armed with ZTM-1 30mm autocannon, KT-7,62 machine gun, KBA-117 30mm grenade launcher.
  - BTR-3DA70: version which used automotive components from the older BTR-70.
- BTR-3KSH: version of command and control vehicle.
- BTR-3M1: 82mm mortar carrier.
- BTR-3M2: 120mm mortar carrier.
- BTR-3BR: armored recovery vehicle.
- BTR-3RK: anti-tank missile carrier.
- BTR-3S: armored ambulance.

== Operators ==
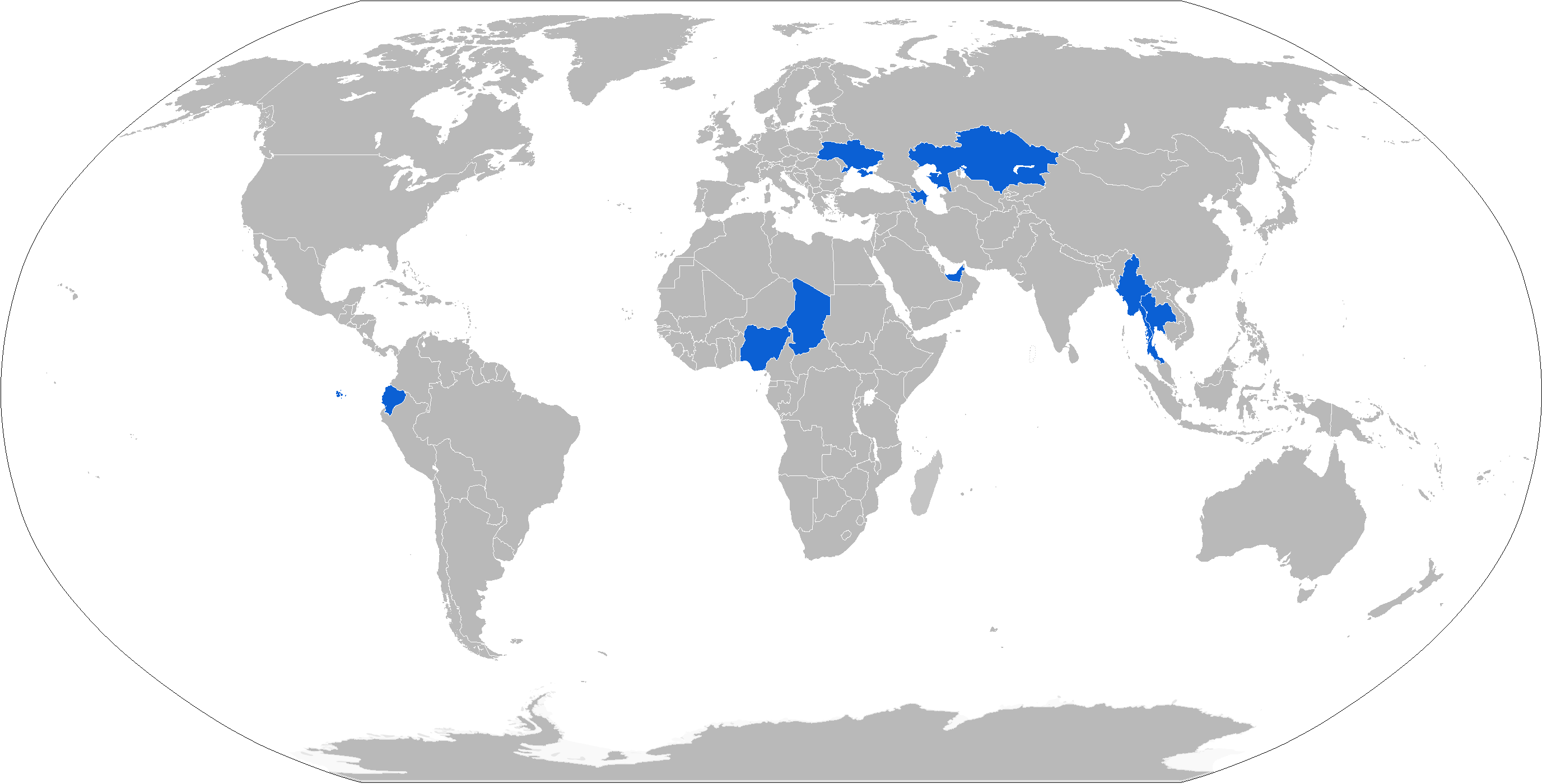
Map of BTR-3 operators in blue

- Azerbaijan: six BTR-3/12.7s
- Chad: 12 BTR-3Es
- Ecuador: three BTR-3Us ordered
- Kazakhstan: two BTR-3Es
- Myanmar: 500+ BTR-3Us in service. 10+ BTR-3Us bought from Ukraine in 2001. Kyiv signed a US$500 million contract in 2004 to supply 1000 BTR-3U armoured personnel carriers (APCs). Purchased as kits to be assembled locally until 2013. According to Building the Tatmadaw report, the Myanmar Army was operating more than 500 BTR-3Us as of 2008. According to Amnesty International, the last batch with 368 BTR-3Us was delivered as of January 2013.
- Nigeria: 30 BTR-3UNs, six BTR-3UKs, four BTR-3UR and seven BTR-3E/14.5s
- Saudi Arabia: General Directorate of Civil Defense
- Russia: At least 12 were captured by Russian forces during the Russian invasion of Ukraine.
- Sudan: Known to operate the BTR-3, at least 4 were confirmed lost during the 2023 Sudan conflict by photographic evidence.
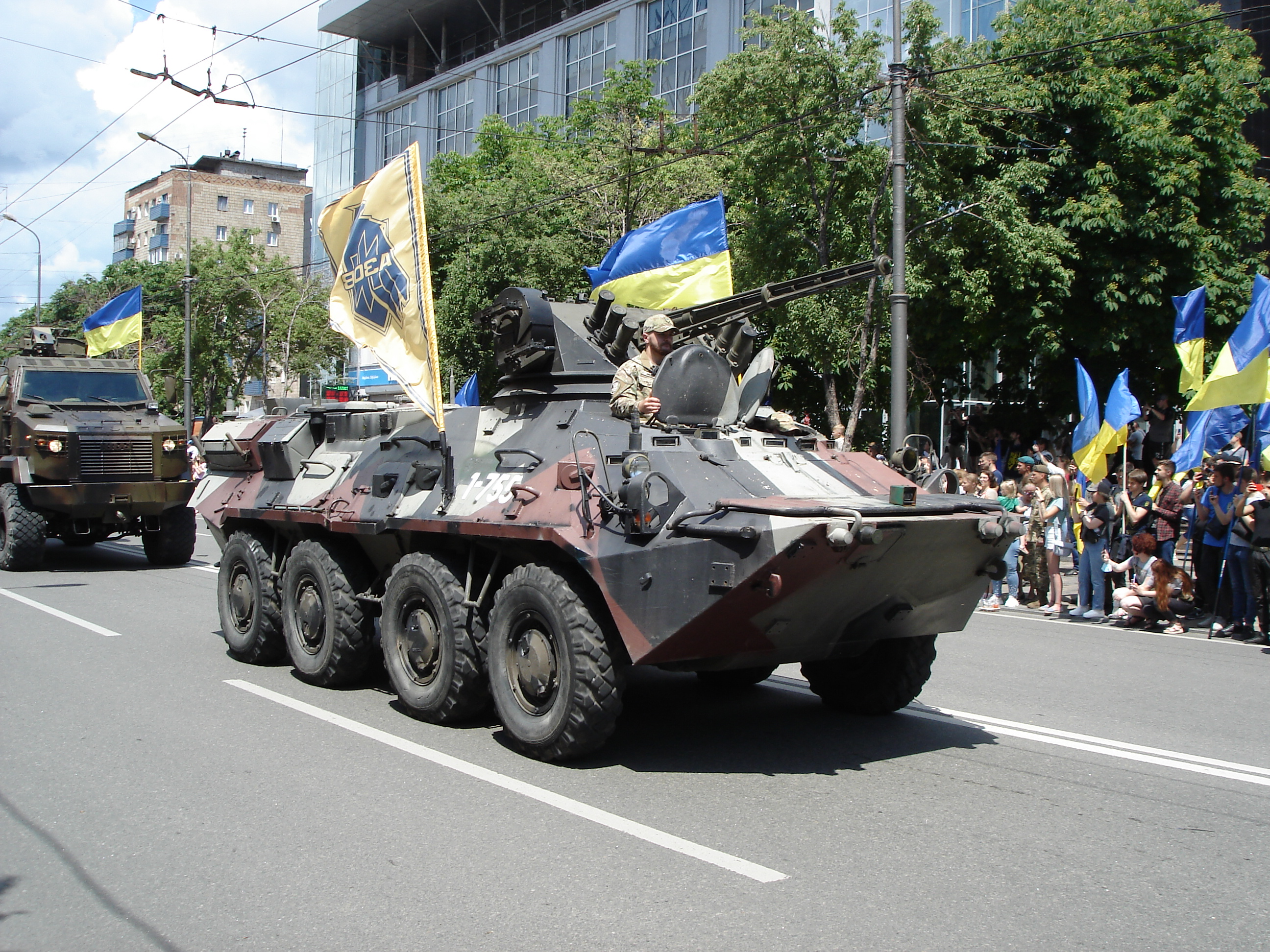
- BTR-3 of the National Guard of Ukraine "Azov" Regiment
  Thailand: 96 BTR-3E1s delivered with the price tag of 4 billion baht, 120 more on order from Ukraine. The first two out of 96 BTR-3E1s were delivered at U Tapao Airport on 17 September 2010. The second batch of 121 BTR-3E1s with a price tag of 5 billion baht has been ordered by the Royal Thai Army and 14 BTR-3E1s have been ordered by the Royal Thai Navy to be used by the Royal Thai Marine Corps in August 2010 with the MTU Engine and Edison Gear. The Royal Thai Army plans to use the BTR-3E1 as the backbone for one regiment of the Mobile Infantry regiment which require 288 BTR-3E1s even though the first 96 BTR-3E1 would only be enough to create one mobile infantry battalion. The first 96 BTR-3E1s consisted of seven different variants including 64 armoured personnel carriers, four command vehicles, three armoured ambulances, nine 81 mm mortar carriers, four 120 mm mortar carriers, six BTR-3E1s for ATMS anti-tank unit, and six armoured recovery vehicles. In addition to the first batch of 96 BTR-3E1s, the Ukrainian government has given five BTR-3E1s for free including four armoured personnel carriers and one armoured recovery vehicle, while making a contract for the maintenance of nine BTR-3E1. The batch of 12 BTR-3E1s for the Royal Thai Marine Corps have reached Thung Prong Port in Sattahip on 24 June 2011 and the ceremony has been held on 29 July 2011. These vehicles are to replace the aging V-150 armoured cars, which will be kept in the Reconnaissance Battalion of the Royal Thai Marine Corps before being deployed in three southern provinces. Another order for 15 BTR-3E1s and 6 BTR-3RKs was placed by the Royal Thai Army in August 2013.
- United Arab Emirates: 90 Guardians
- Ukraine: 22 BTR-3Es were ordered for the Armed Forces of Ukraine and the National Guard of Ukraine, five BTR-3Es were delivered in June 2014, and 50 BTR-3DAs in December 2017.

== See also ==
- BTR-7
- BTR-80
- BTR-4
