= BTR-7 =

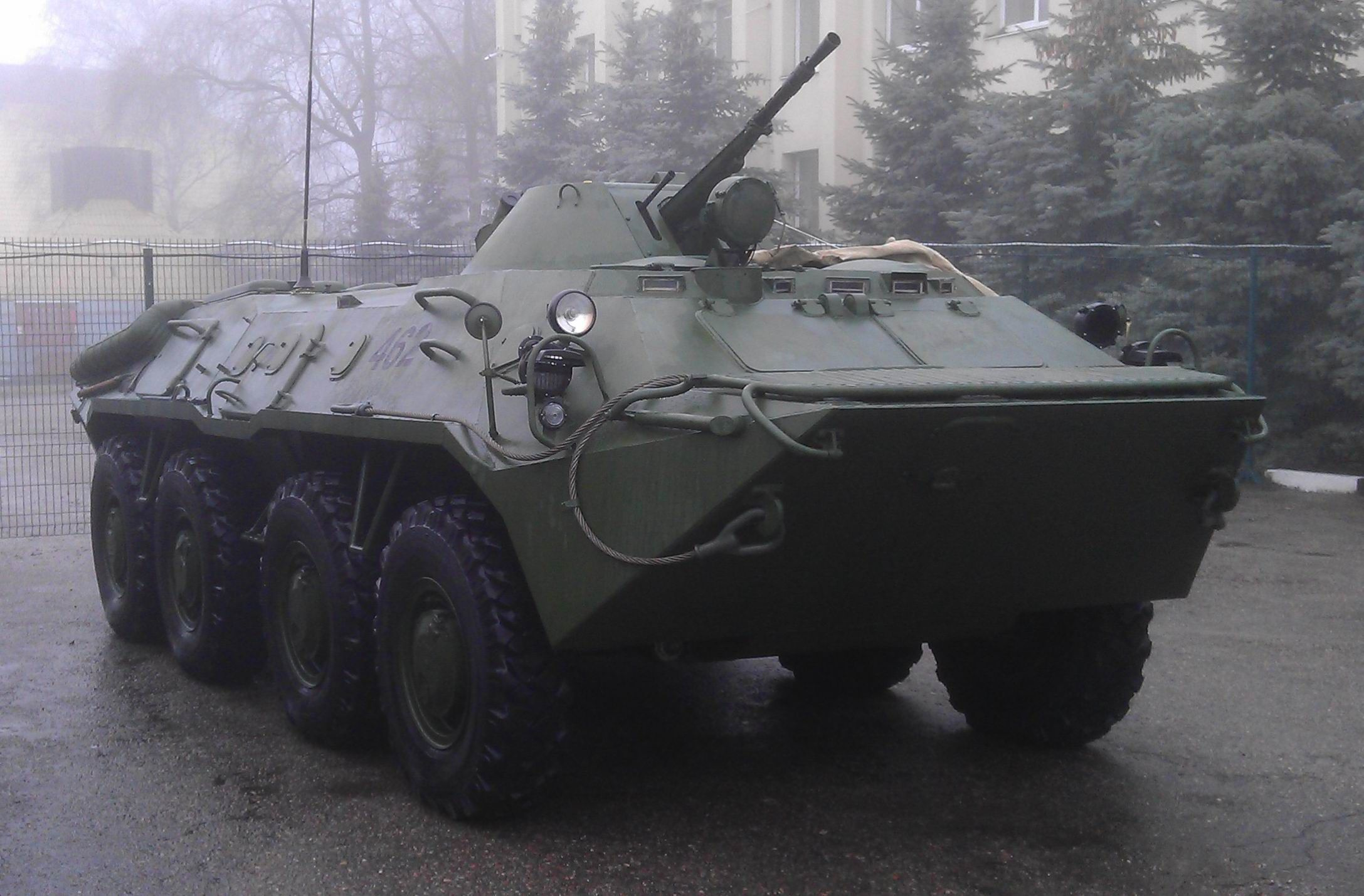
- Type: Armored personnel carrier
- Place of origin: Ukraine

Service history
- In service: Ukrainian Ground Forces

Production history
- Produced: 2011
- Variants: See below

Specifications
- Mass: 12.2 tonnes
- Length: 7.595 m
- Width: 2.8 m
- Height: 2.25 m (including turret)
- Crew: 3 crew (+7 troops)
- Armor: Classified
- Main armament: 14.5 mm KPVT machine gun
- Secondary armament: 7.62 mm PKT machine gun
- Engine: FPT Iveco Tector; 2 × 150 hp
- Suspension: wheeled 8×8
- Ground clearance: 0.49 m
- Maximum speed: 100 km/h

The BTR-70DI is a Ukrainian upgrade of the Soviet BTR-70 with BTR-80 hatch and new diesel engines.

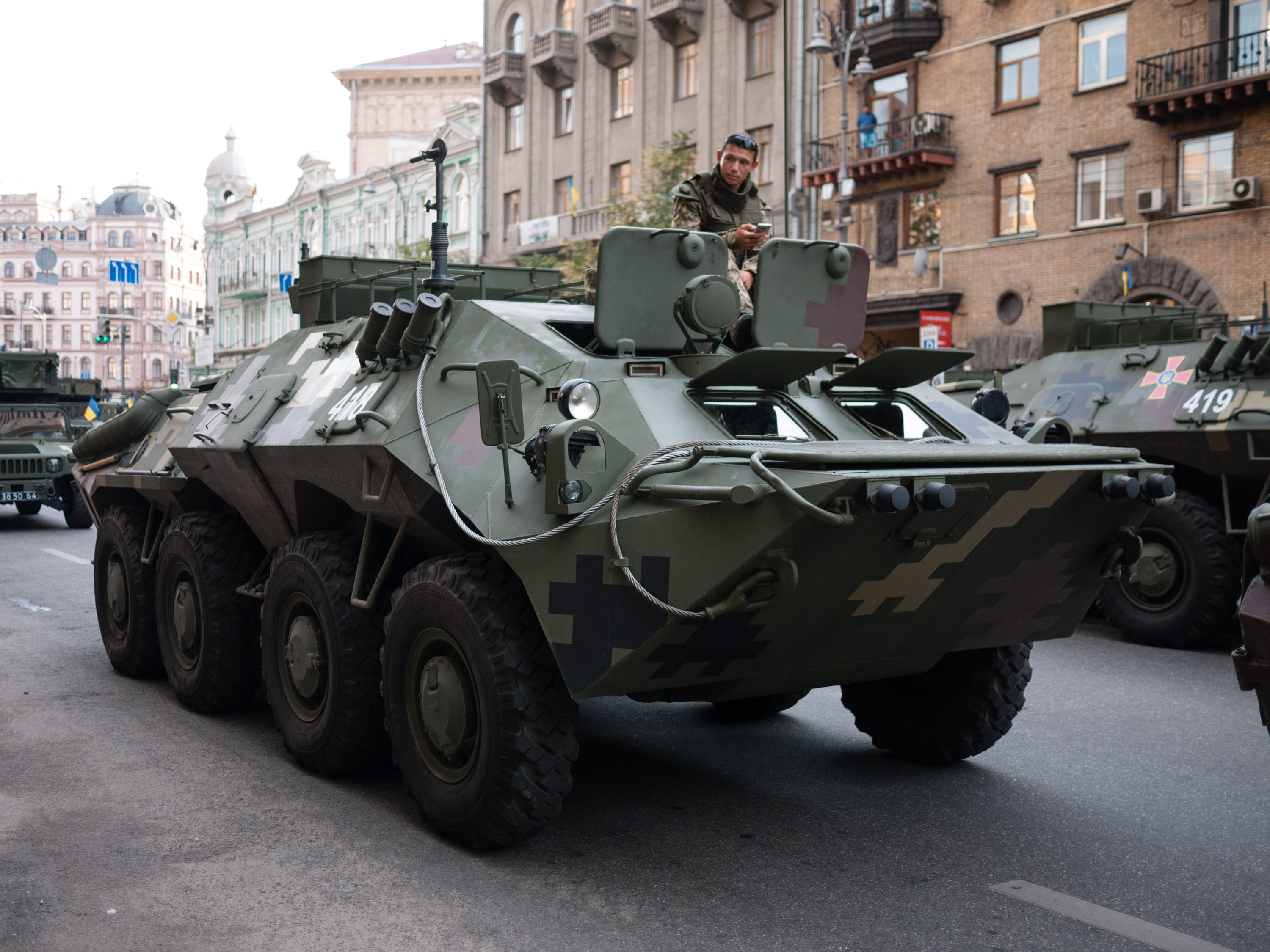
BTR-70DI-02 "Svityaz"

== Description ==
The vehicle is a 8x8 wheeled armoured personnel carrier.

It has 2 FPT Iveco Tector engines (from the Iveco EuroCargo truck) P4 (Euro III), 150 hp each.

Can be optionally fitted with modular turrets "Ingul" or "Bug" or with the "Zaslon" active protection system.

== Variants ==
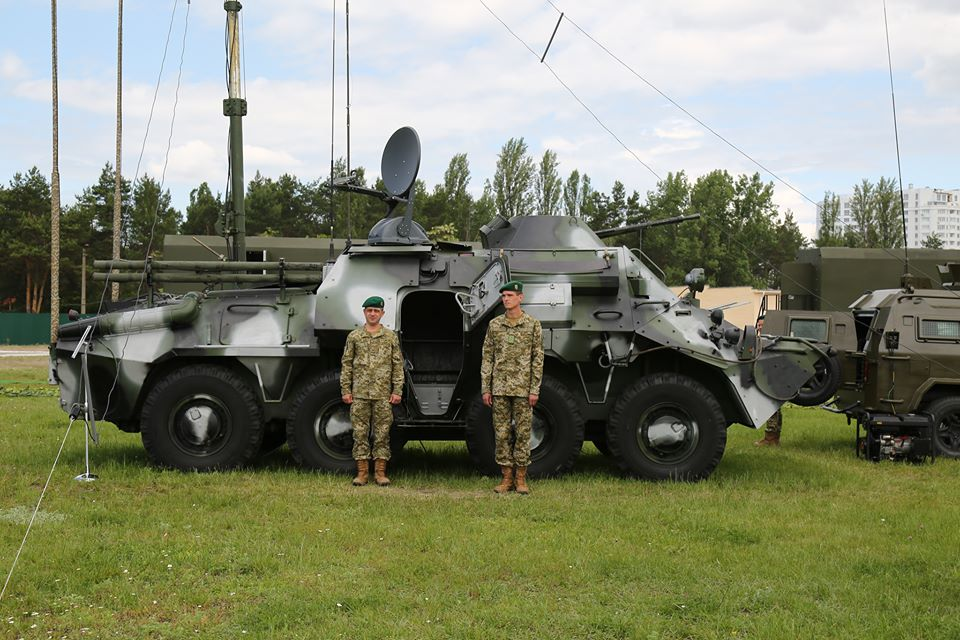
BTR-70DI-02 "Svityaz" (May 2016)

- BTR-70DI (БТР-70Дi), also known as BTR-7 "Defender" - armoured personnel carrier
- BTR-70DI-02 "Svityaz" (БТР-70Дi-02 "Свiтязь") - armoured command vehicle. The first vehicle was built in 2012
- BMM-70 (БММ-70) - armored medical vehicle, at least six were built
- BREM-7K (БРЕМ-7К), also known as BREM-2000 - armoured recovery vehicle equipped with specialized lifting and recovery equipment

== Operators ==
- Ukraine: As of 2 March 2025, Ukraine lost 33 BTR-7 (15 destroyed,3 damaged and abandoned,1 captured.
- Russia: At least 15 have been captured by Russian forces during the 2022 Russian invasion of Ukraine.
