= BTR-70 =

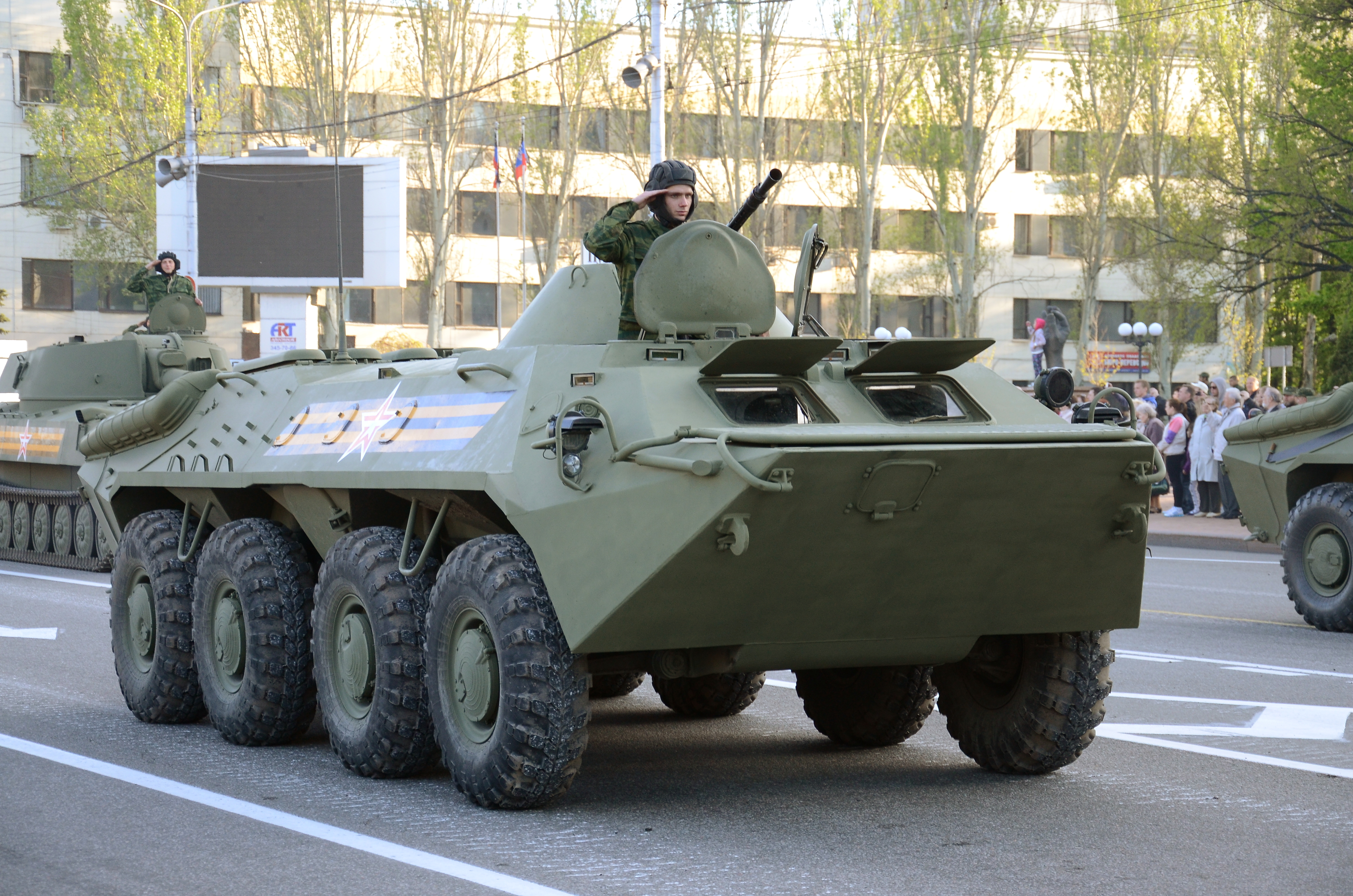
- BTR-70 on parade in Donetsk, 2015
- Type: Armoured personnel carrier
- Place of origin: Soviet Union

Service history
- In service: 1972–present
- Used by: See Operators
- Wars: Soviet–Afghan War; Angolan Civil War; Afghan Civil War (1989–92); First Nagorno-Karabakh War; First Chechen War; War in Donbas; 2020 Nagorno-Karabakh conflict; 2021 Kyrgyzstan–Tajikistan conflict; Russo-Ukrainian war

Specifications
- Mass: 11.5 tonnes
- Length: 7.535 m
- Width: 2.80 m
- Height: 2.32 m
- Crew: 3 (+7 passengers)
- Armor: 9 mm (front); 7 mm (sides)
- Main armament: 14.5 mm KPVT machine gun or 12.7 mm DShK
- Secondary armament: 7.62 mm PKT machine gun
- Engine: 2× gasoline ZMZ-4905; 120 hp (88.2 kW) (×2)
- Power/weight: 20 hp/tonne
- Suspension: wheeled 8×8
- Operational range: 400–600 km
- Maximum speed: 80 km/h, swim 9 km/h

The BTR-70 is an eight-wheeled armored personnel carrier (Russian: бронетранспортёр, БТР, romanized: bronetransportyor, lit. 'armored carrier') originally developed by the Soviet Union during the late 1960s under the manufacturing code GAZ-4905. On August 21, 1972, it was accepted into Soviet service and would later be widely exported. Large quantities were also produced under license in Romania as the TAB-77.

The BTR-70 was developed as a potential successor for the earlier BTR-60 series of Soviet wheeled armored personnel carriers, specifically the BTR-60PB, which it most closely resembled. It evolved out of an earlier, unsuccessful project known as the GAZ-50 to design a new wheeled infantry fighting vehicle on the chassis and drive train of a BTR-60PB. It initially received the NATO reporting name BTR M1970.

== Development History ==
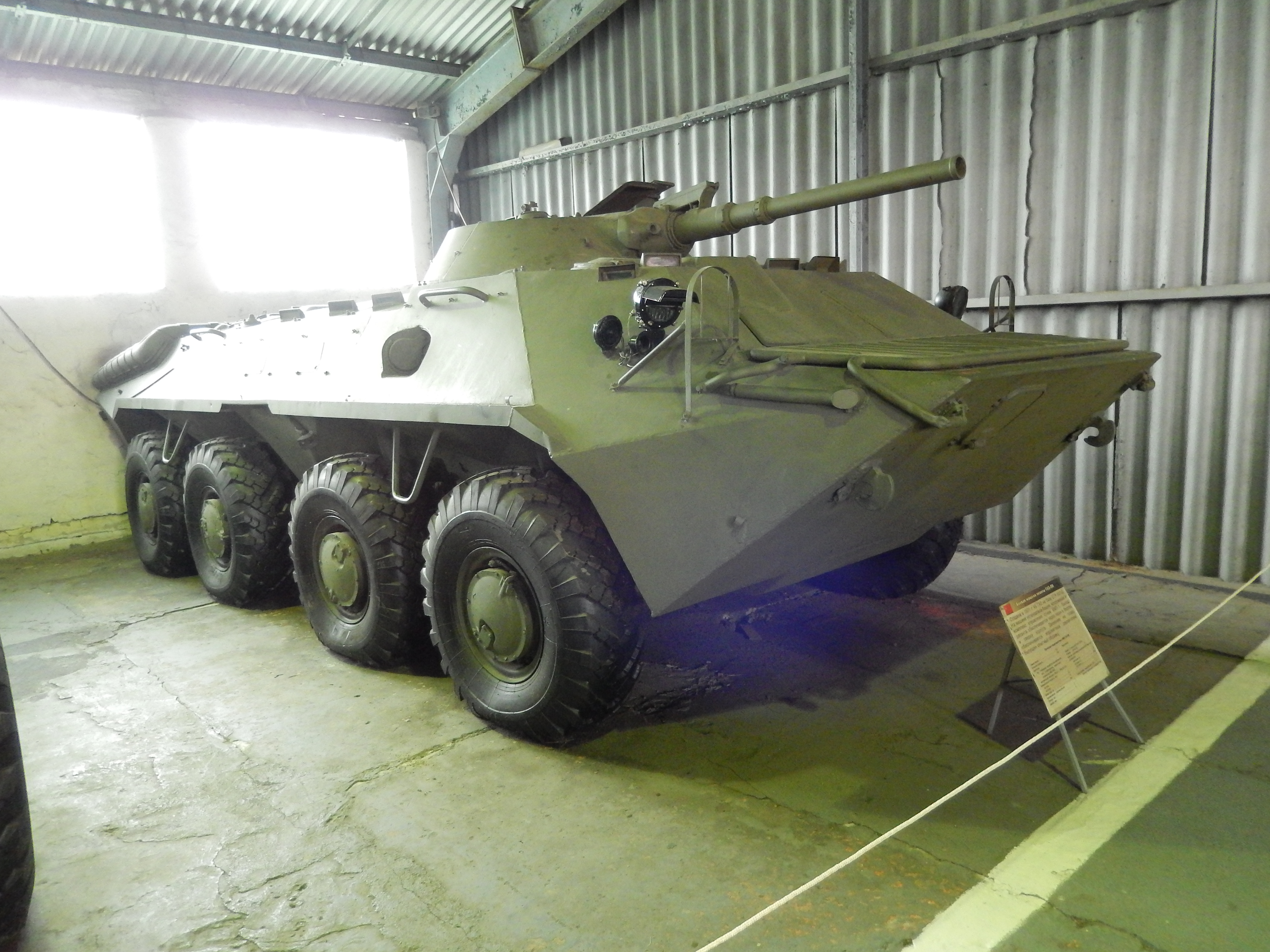
The original GAZ-50 prototype.

In 1971, the Soviet Armed Forces began investigating the possibility of an updated BTR-60PB redesigned to make the vehicle more compatible with the BMP-1 in terms of tactical training. This resulted in the development of a BTR-60PB prototype essentially converted into a wheeled infantry fighting vehicle, designated Obiekt 50 or GAZ-50. Despite retaining the original BTR-60PB chassis, the GAZ-50 incorporated several elements of the BMP's design, including similar seating arrangements in the passenger compartment. The revised internal layout reduced the number of passengers to nine. New hatches were also provided for debarking in the lower hull, between the second and third wheel stations. Other modifications included a slightly thicker hull, increased power-to-weight ratio, and additional firing ports. Another feature retained from the BTR-60 was the twin-engine arrangement, although in the GAZ-50 torque produced by the right engine powered the first and third wheel stations, while the left engine powered the second and fourth. This alteration was to allow the vehicle to continue moving even if one engine failed. The prototype was armed with a turret resembling that of the BMP-1, incorporating the same 73mm 2A28 Grom low-pressure smoothbore cannon.

There was some debate as to the GAZ-50's viability in its intended role; for example, projected manufacturing costs were high due to the incorporation of the BMP-1 turret and armament. Furthermore, while the prototype would allow motorized units to emulate the tactics of Soviet mechanized infantry, it simply did not offer the same protection, mobility, and firepower of the BMP. Most of the funding earmarked for the program was thus diverted into producing larger numbers of BMPs instead, as well as ensuring their wider introduction beyond Soviet tank divisions. A second GAZ-50 prototype was built, designated Obiekt 60 mounting a 14.5mm machine gun in exactly the same turret as that carried by the BTR-60 series; this was accepted as a generic replacement for the BTR-60PB in motorized rifle regiments. In Soviet service, the new BTRs received the designation BTR-70.

Compared to the earlier BTR-60PB, relatively small numbers of BTR-70s were produced. The design was still regarded as suffering from some of the same disadvantages, such as the two flammable petrol engines and the poor means of entry and exit. These flaws became especially evident when the vehicle was tested in combat during the Soviet–Afghan War. As a result, in 1984 the Soviet Army took delivery of a new wheeled armored personnel carrier, the BTR-80, which was powered by a single 260 horsepower diesel engine and a simpler drive train. Production of the BTR-70 was terminated that year.

The Soviet Union only exported BTR-70s to four other states: Afghanistan, the German Democratic Republic (East Germany), Hungary, and Romania, which also purchased a license to manufacture the design locally. However, many have since been inherited by the armies of various post-Soviet republics or re-exported.

== Equipment ==
The BTR-70 is powered by two petrol engines. Early production vehicles used 115 hp GAZ-69B 6-cylinder engines, but most vehicles have now been retrofitted with the more powerful ZMZ-49-05 V-8 engines. The vehicle is fully amphibious, propelled when afloat by a single water jet mounted at the rear of the hull. To prepare the vehicle for water, the driver erects a trim vane and switches on the bilge pumps from within the vehicle.

The standard equipment includes a central tire-pressure regulation system that allows the driver to adjust the tire-pressure to suit the terrain being crossed. Also fitted is an R-123M radio set and an R-124 intercom. The driver's optical equipment consists of three TNPO-115 vision blocks and a TNP-B day vision device, which can be replaced by a TVNO-2B night vision device. The commander also has three TNPO-115s and either a TPKU-2B day sight or a TKN-1S night sight accompanied by an OU-3GA-2 infra-red search light. The turret is fitted with a PP-61AM (or 1PZ-2) periscopic sight for the gunner and the infantry group in the troop compartment is provided with TNP-B devices. The BTR-70 also has an FVU NBC filter system and a DK-3B detection device.

The armaments consist of a KPVT heavy machine gun with 500 rounds and a coaxial 7.62 mm PKT machine gun with 2,000 rounds. Also on board are two "Igla" or "Strela-3" MANPADS, and optionally two AGS-17 grenade launchers at the expense of two infantry men.

== Variants ==
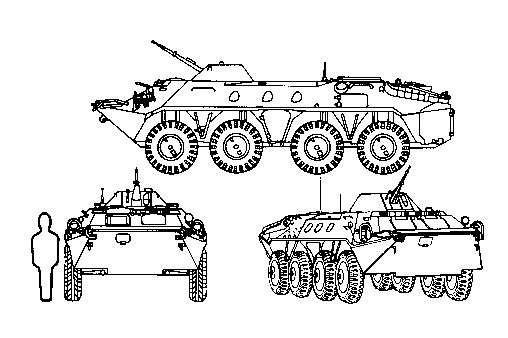

=== Soviet Union/Russian Federation ===
- BTR-70: Basic APC version, as described.
  - BTR-70 obr. 1978: Initial version, publicly displayed in 1980.
  - BTR-70 obr. 1982: Improved model with 120 hp ZMZ-49-05 V-8 engines, instead of the original GAZ-49B 115 hp 6-cylinder engines.
  - BTR-70 obr. 1984: Slightly modified model with an additional TNPT-1 periscope on the turret roof.
  - BTR-70 obr. 1986: Improved version with a periscope on the left side of the turret and four firing ports in the hull roof.
  - BTR-70V: Late-production model fitted with the BPU-1 turret of the BTR-80, with an 1PZ-2 sight, but without the "Tucha" smoke grenade launchers.
  - BTR-70M: Modernized version with turret, diesel engine and rear hull section of the BTR-80. Users include Nicaragua, Kyrgyz Republic, Mongolia and Syria.
  - BTR-70D: Diesel version, developed by Muromteplovoz and powered by a YaMZ-236D 180 hp diesel engine. Prototype only.
- SPR-2 "Rtut-B" (stantsiya pomekh radiovzryvatelyam): Electronic warfare variant, designed to detonate artillery shells with proximity fuze detonators.
  - SPR-2M: Modified version with more compact equipment.
- BTR-70K (komandnyj): Command vehicle with additional radios, several whip antennas, navigation device and a portable generator.
- BTR-70KShM (komandno-shtabnaya mashina): Command and control variant, designed to be used as a mobile command post.
- 2S14 Zhalo-S: Wheeled tank destroyer, armed with a 2A62 85 mm gun. Prototype only.
- SA-22 (spetsapparatnaya mashina): command vehicle.
- 15Ya56M MBP (mashina boyevogo posta): base security vehicle for Strategic Rocket units. The original turret has been replaced by a new type with an 1PN22M1 improved sight, loudspeakers, OU-3GA-2 IR search lights, additional TNPO-170 periscopes and an NSVT 12.7 mm machine gun.
- BTR-80

=== Ukraine ===
- BTR-70D: Upgraded from 2001 by NRMZ and fitted with a 300 hp diesel engine. Ukrainian army vehicles additionally have BTR-80 style two-piece escape hatches in the hull sides.
- BTR-70DI (BTR-7): With Euro II 276 hp diesel engine from IVECO. Can be optionally fitted with "Ingul" or "Bug" modular turrets or with the "Zaslon" active protection system. The basic armament is augmented by an AGS-30 automatic grenade launcher and 2 AT rockets.
- BTR-70M: Upgraded by Marozov and powered by a 300 hp engine UTD-20. Might be fitted with a new turret, like the "Grom" or BAU-23x2.
- BTR-70SM: Unarmed ambulance with a re-designed hull. Three different models have been observed.

=== East-Germany ===
- SPW 70 (Schützenpanzerwagen): NVA designator for Romanian-made BTR-70. 1,316 delivered between 1980 and 1990.
  - SPW 70(S): Locally converted staff vehicle with two extra radios, two/three whip antennas and a slim telescopic mast on the right side of the hull roof.
  - SPW 70(SL): Forward air control vehicle, equipped with an R-809M2 radio and fitted with four whip antennas.
  - SPW 70(Ch): NBC reconnaissance vehicle with detection and marking systems. Prototype only.

=== Slovakia/Belarus ===
- Cobra-K: Fitted with a 2A42-Cobra modular turret. Might be optionally equipped with a new KamAZ-7403 diesel engine.

=== Belarus ===
- BTR-70M-A1: Proposed upgrade from Minotaur with a diesel engine and improved transmission. The vehicle might retain the original turret or can be fitted with a new one, for example the CM30/BM30 (2A42-Cobra) "combat module".
- BTR-MK a.k.a. KM-70: Proposed command vehicle (komandnaya mashina) from Minotaur with a crew of six and R-123M and R-13M radios.
- MTP-K a.k.a. MTP-70: Technical support vehicle (mashina tekhnicheskoj pomoshchi), fitted with tow bars, a work platform and a light crane. This version retains the turret, but without the KPVT machine gun.
- BTR-70MB1: Upgrade from 140 Repair plant with a diesel engine and improved transmission. It has been supplied to the Ivory Coast.

=== Azerbaijan ===
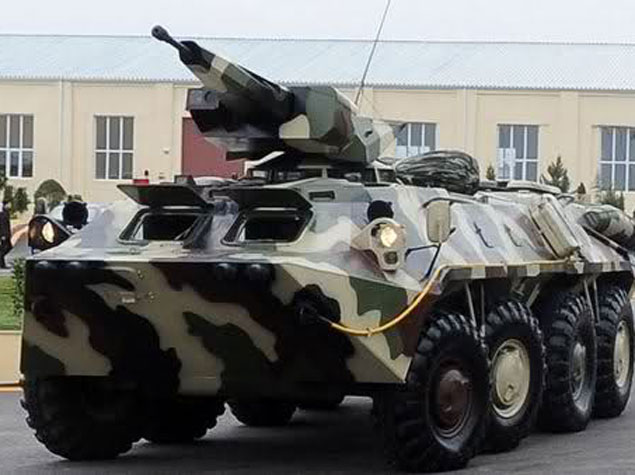
Azerbaijani modernised BTR-70

- BTR-70M: Jihazgayirma Instrument Construction Plant in Baku presented some upgraded BTR-70s for the first time in March 2011. These vehicles have a new diesel engine and improved transmission. Optionally, the original machine-gun turret might be replaced with the "Şimşek" (Lightning) one-man turret. "Şimşek" was developed in partnership with South Africa's Emerging World Technologies (EWT) and appears to be a variant of EWT's Predator II light compact turret.

=== Romania ===
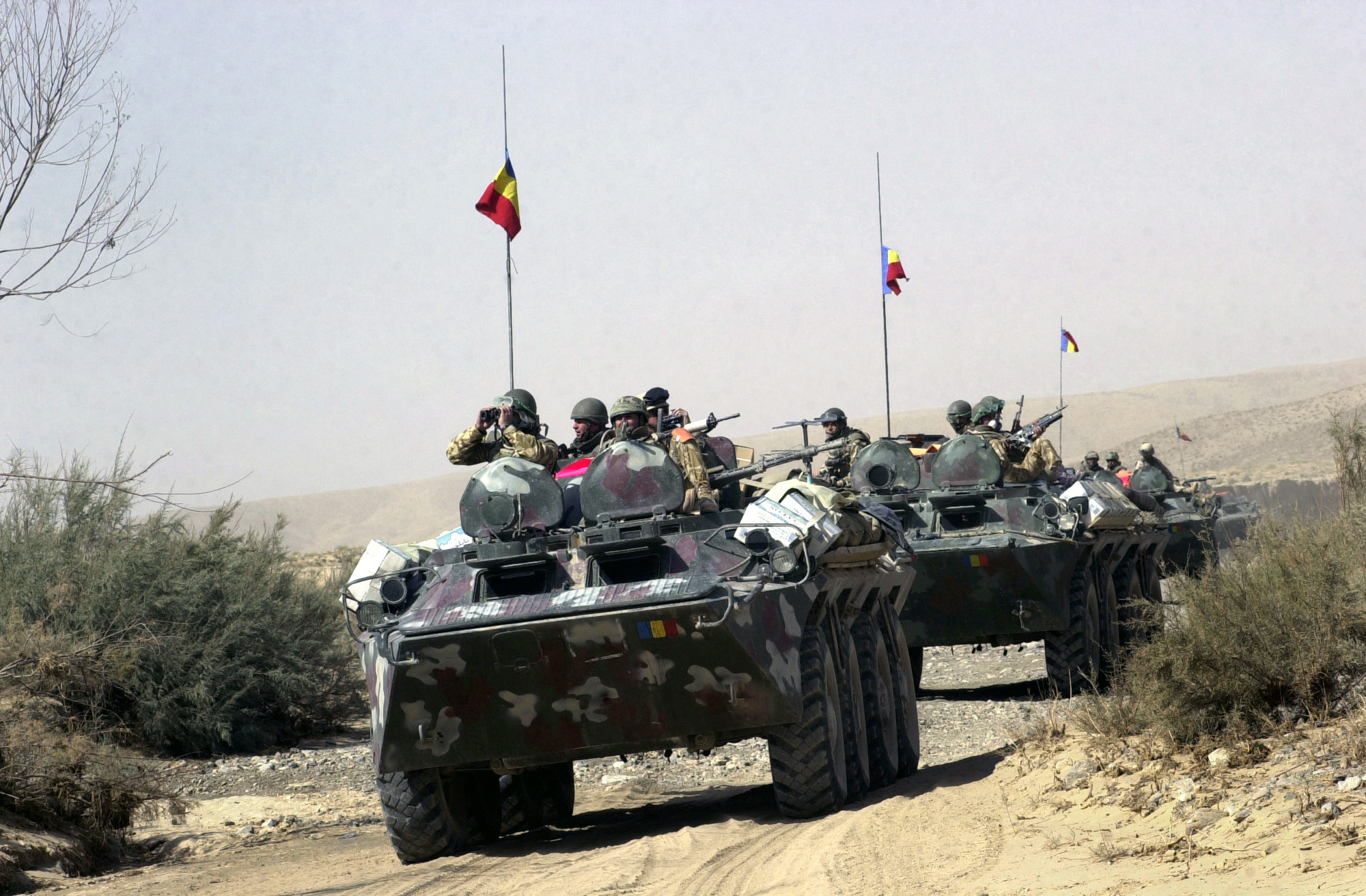
Romanian TAB-77 Armored Personnel Carriers in Afghanistan

- TAB-77 (transportorul amfibiu blindat): Romania not only built the BTR-70 under licence (for export), but also developed its own, improved version. While very similar, the TAB-77 has the same turret (with the LOTA aiming system) as the TAB-71. The original gasoline engines were replaced with Saviem 797-05M1 132 hp diesel engines.
  - TAB-77 M1983: upgraded version with a 30 mm gun and 9M14M "Malyutka" ATGM. Prototype.
  - TAB-77 M1984: upgraded version with a 23 mm gun and 9M14M "Malyutka" ATGM. Prototype.
  - TAB-77A PCOMA (punct de commanda şi observare mobil de artilerie): artillery command and forward observer vehicle with range finders in a big, unarmed turret. Armament consists of a single, pintle-mounted 7.62 mm machine gun on the hull roof.
  - TAB-77A R-1451/M: command vehicle with R-1070 and R-1451M radios. Similar to the basic APC, but with additional whip antennas and a rear-mounted generator.
  - TAB-77A R-1452: signals vehicle with an R-1452 radio, low-profile "dummy turret, seven whip antennas, a telescopic mast, two generators at the rear and a pintle-mounted machine gun on the hull roof.
  - TERA-77L (tractor de evacuare şi reparat auto): recovery vehicle with a 5t crane and a dozer blade.
  - TABC-79: shorter version with only four wheels. Several variants exist.
  - Chinese TAB-77: Chinese license built TAB-77, with a small number entering Chinese service for evaluation purpose in the 1980s. China purchased the production license from Romania in 1984, and even retained the original Romanian designation TAB-77. The Chinese built TAB-77 is heavier, weighing more than 13 tons.

=== Sudan ===
- Shareef-3: Revealed in March 2019, replaced both engines with single diesel engine, while adding BMP-1 turret, capacity for six dismounts.

== Combat history ==
The BTR-70 first saw service during the Soviet–Afghan War. A very small quantity of BTR-70s were donated or sold to the People's Armed Forces for the Liberation of Angola in the mid-1980s by an undisclosed country; these saw action during the Angolan Civil War. BTR-70s were deployed by the United Nations Protection Force (UNPROFOR) in Bosnia-Herzegovina during the Yugoslav Wars.

BTR-70s were used in the War in Donbas.

During 2021 Kyrgyzstan–Tajikistan clashes BTR-70s were deployed by Kyrgyzstan with at least one BTR-70M lost to enemy fire.

During the 2022 Russian invasion of Ukraine, BTR-70s were deployed by Russia with 16 BTR-70s lost (13 destroyed, 1 damaged, 1 abandoned, one captured) and 12 BTR-70M (11 destroyed, one captured) visually confirmed by Oryx as of 17 December 2024.

== Operators ==
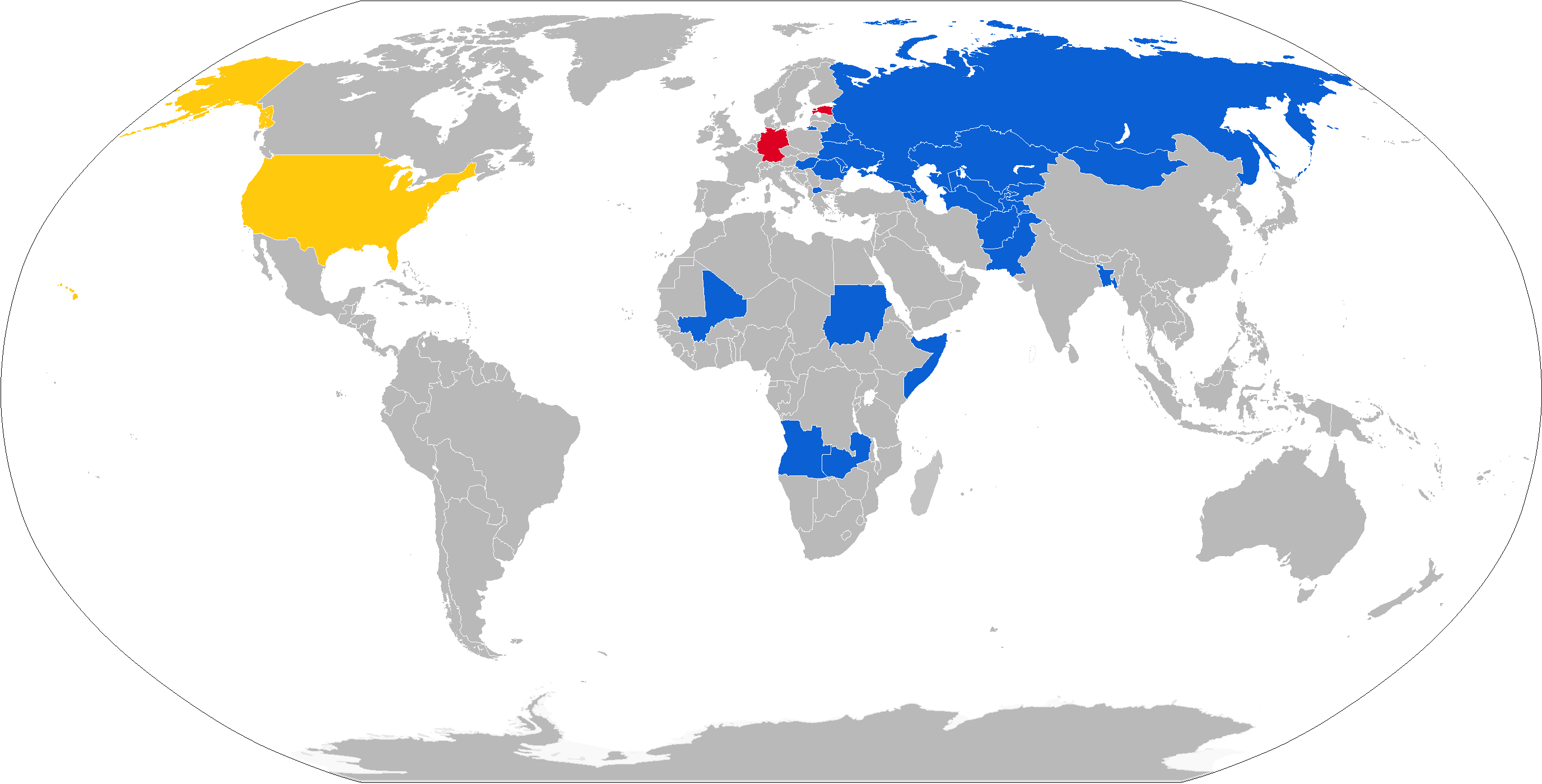
Map of BTR-70 operators in blue with former operators in red. The United States, which uses BTR-70s for OPFOR training exercises only, is indicated in yellow.

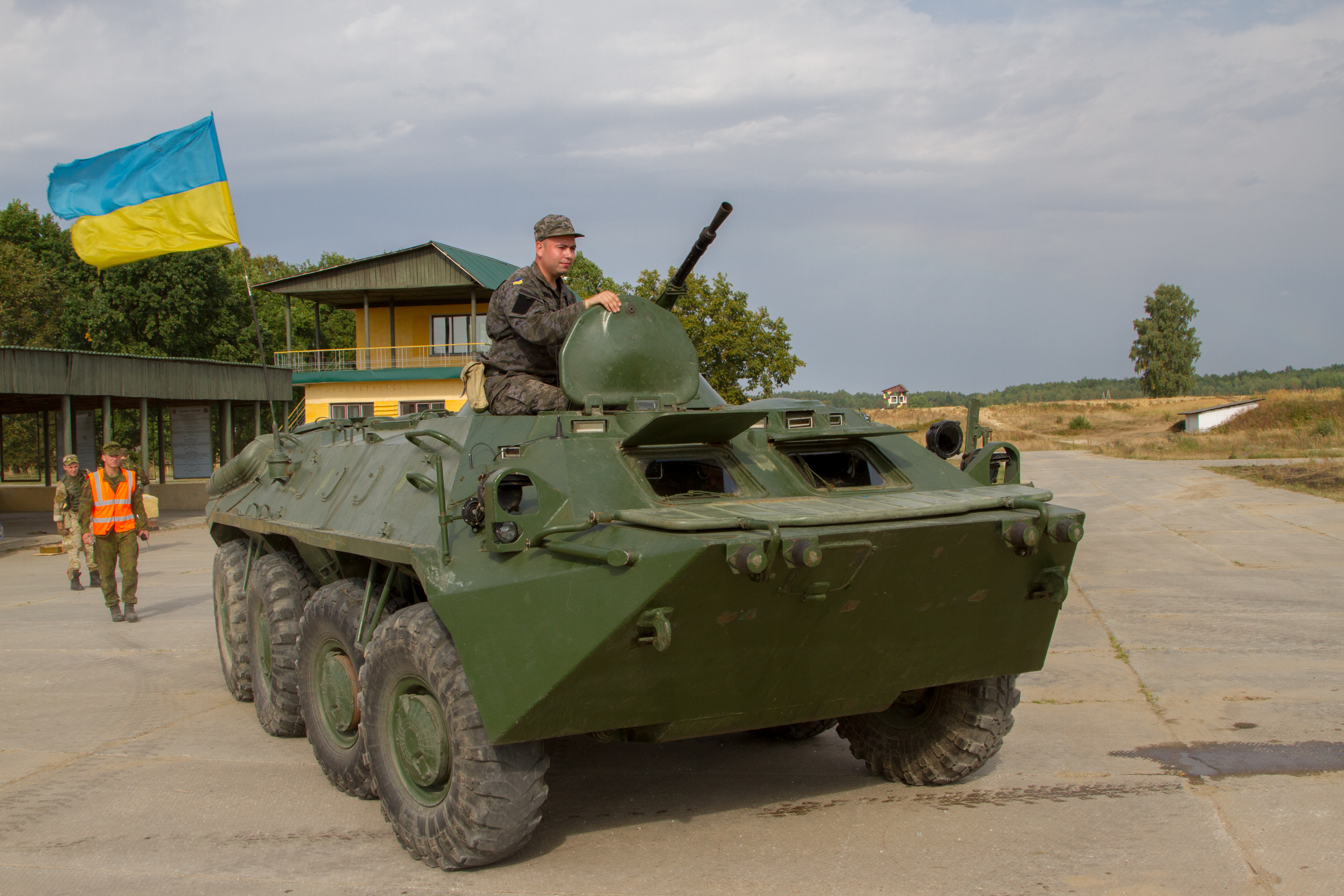
BTR-70 of the Ukrainian National Guard, 2015.

=== Current operators ===
- Angola: ~200 BTR-152, BTR-60, BTR-70 and BTR-80 in service as of 2026.
- Armenia: 36+ BTR-70 in service as of 2026.
- Azerbaijan 151+ BTR-70 in service as of 2026.
- Belarus: ~64 BTR-70M1 in service as of 2026.
- Georgia: 40+ BTR-70 in service as of 2026.; some modernized to BTR-70Di/BTR-7 standard.
- Ghana: 20 BTR-70 in service as of 2026.
- Ivory Coast: 3+ BTR-70MB in service as of 2026.
- Kazakhstan: ~300 BTR-60 and BTR-70 in storage as of 2026.
- Kyrgyzstan: 25 BTR-70 and 20 BTR-70M in service as of 2026.
- Mongolia: 40 BTR-70M in service as of 2026.
- North Macedonia: 56 BTR-70 in service as of 2026.
- Nicaragua: 40 BTR-70M in service as of 2026.
- Pakistan: 120 BTR-70 and BTR-80 in service as of 2026.
- Russia: 900 BTR-60 and BTR-70 (including variants) in service with the Ground Forces as of 2026; some BTR-70M in service with the Russian National Guard a sof 2026. 1,200 BTR-60, BTR-70 and BTR-80 (including variants) in storage as of 2026.
- Romania: 195 TAB-77 (including variants) in service as of 2026.
- Sudan: some BTR-70M Kobra 2 in service as of 2026. 31, including 2 Kobra K-2 variant as of 2016.
- Syria: some BTR-70 in service as of 2026.
- Tajikistan: 23 BTR-60 and BTR-70 in service as of 2026.
- Turkmenistan: 300 BTR-70 in service as of 2026.
- Ukraine: 350 BTR-60, BTR-70 and BTR-80 in service with the Army as of 2026; some BTR-70 in service with the Ukrainian National Guard as of 2026.
- Uzbekistan: 25 BTR-70 in service as of 2026.
- Zambia: 20 BTR-70 in service as of 2026.

=== Former operators ===
- Afghanistan
- Cuba
- East Germany: 1,266
- Hungary
- Mali: More than 9; purchased from Bulgaria and Russia.
- Moldova
- (Palestine) Palestinian National Authority: 50
- Slovakia
- Somalia: 3
- Soviet Union: Passed on to successor states.
- United Nations Protection Force: 452; donated by Germany.
- United States: 7; used for OPFOR training exercises.

== See also ==
- BTR-60
- BTR-80
- BTR-90
- BTR-94
