= Yad La-Shiryon =

Military museum in the Israeli-occupied West Bank

The Armored Corps Memorial Site and Museum at Latrun
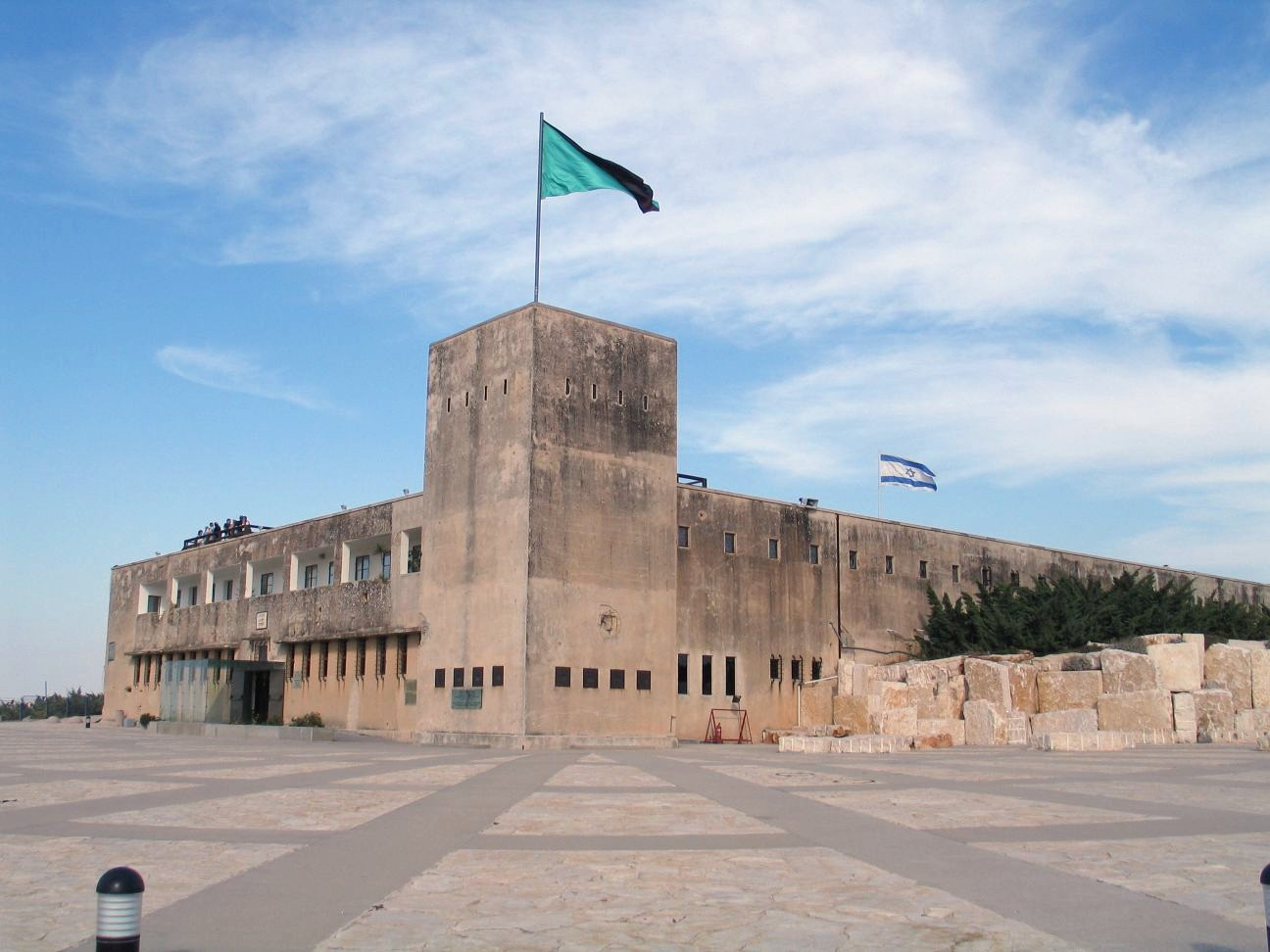
- A Mandatory Palestine era Tegart fort serves as the main building of Yad La-Shiryon.

- Location of museum
- Established: 1982
- Location: Latrun, Israel
- Coordinates: 31.838056°N 34.980417°E
- Type: Military Museum
- Website: www.yadlashiryon.com

Yad La-Shiryon (officially: The Armored Corps Memorial Site and Museum at Latrun; Hebrew: יד לשריון) is Israel's official memorial site for fallen soldiers from the armored corps, as well as one of the most diverse tank museums in the world. The cornerstone for Yad La-Shiryon was laid on December 14, 1982.

The site was created through the initiative of veteran officers of the armored corps. The outdoor display includes 110 tanks and other armored fighting vehicles, both Israeli and captured enemy examples including the Merkava and T-34, T-54, T-55, T-62 tanks, as well as vehicles obtained or purchased from allied nations specifically for diversifying the collection like the German Leopard tank or the only T-72 on display in Israel. Other notable items include: an M4 Sherman tank mounted high atop a former British water tower; a collection of mobile bridges constructed by the IDF (Israel Defense Forces) which can be carried by tanks and erected while under fire; captured enemy vehicles, most of which Israel has modified and updated; a tank with a blown up gun; and a long, engraved commemorative wall bearing the names of Armored Corps soldiers killed in defense of the country.

== Memorial site ==
The main building, a Mandate-era Tegart fortress, houses a library with a publicly accessible computerized record of every fallen Israeli tank soldier, and a synagogue. The deeply pocked outer walls of the fort are a reminder of the building's wartime past and its use by the Arab Legion. The tower of the fortress has been converted into a Tower of Tears by Israeli artist, Danny Karavan. The inside of the tower is covered by steel taken from a tank, and water circulating from a pool underneath the installation trickles down the walls.

The museum also features a large amphitheater, an auditorium, and has photos, poetry, paintings, and cartoons on display. Screenings are held regularly, showing both historical film footage and more recent tributes to Israelis injured and fallen.

The Wall of Names, erected outside, displays the names of all the soldiers from the Armored Corps killed in the 1948 Arab–Israeli War and later wars.

== Tank on the tower ==
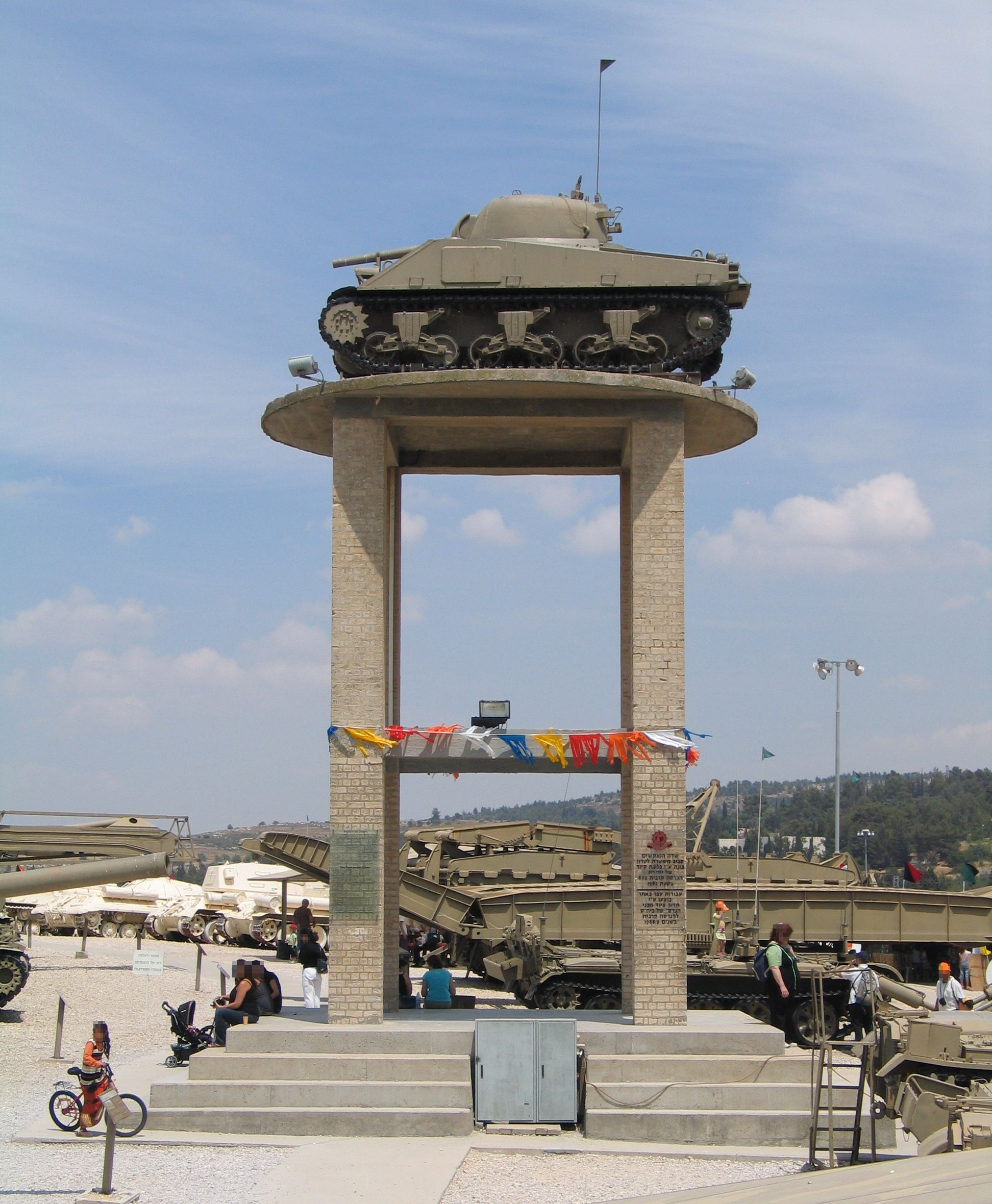
The Sherman tank on the tower

The most famous sight at Yad La-Shiryon is most likely that of a tank on top of a tower, which serves as the museum's logo. In 1979, by decision of late Major General (Ret.) Moshe Peled, the tank was hoisted on top of a tower on the site, which was originally used as a water tower. The tank that was chosen is an American M4 Sherman, one of the first tanks that fought in the service of the Israel Defense Forces. Since the water tower was only designed to support 25 tons and the tank weighed 34 tons, both the engine and transmission gears had to be removed.

== Tank collection ==
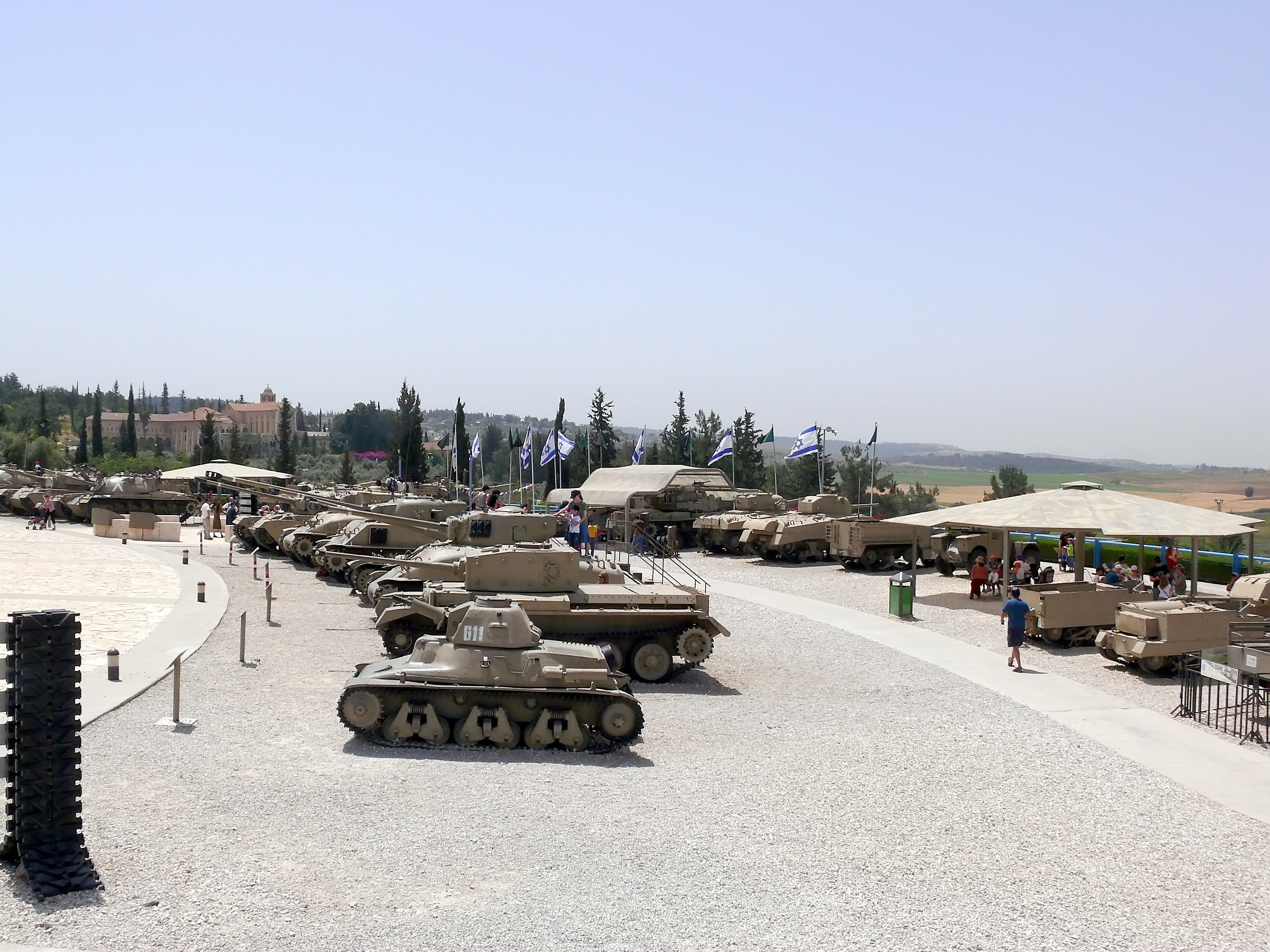
Latrun tank collection

Yad La-shiryon has a collection of tanks and armored vehicles. There are over a hundred different vehicles in the collection.

Here are some of the tanks and military vehicles on display. Variants are usually listed under the original country of origin.

=== Israeli ===
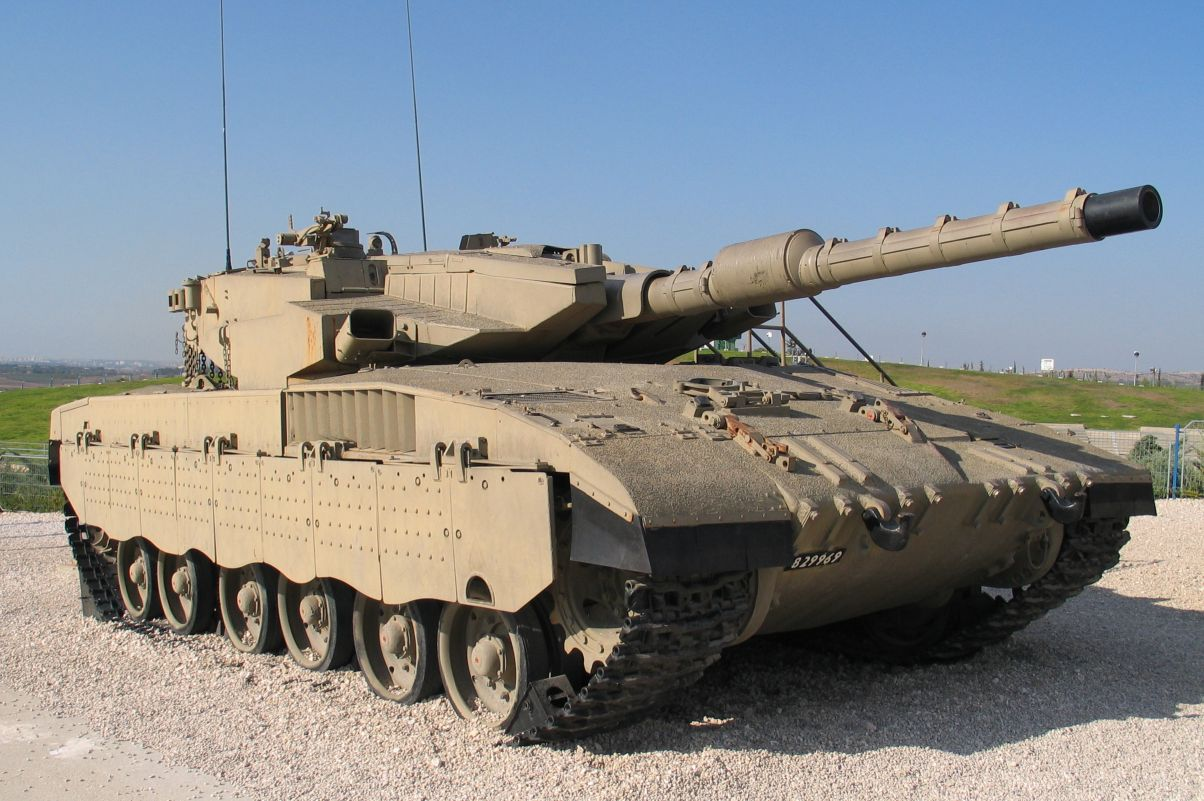
Israeli Merkava III at Yad La-Shiryon

- Merkava MBT mark I, II, III, IV and Namer APC
- Nimda Shoet APC, loosely modeled after BTR-152
- Nodedet
- For Israeli variations of the Patton tank, see under American: Patton tank -> Magach.
- For Israeli variations of the T-54/T-55 tanks, see under Soviet: T-54/T-55 -> IDF Achzarit, Tiran-4, Tiran-5. For the Israeli variant of the T-62 tank, see under Soviet: T-62 -> IDF Tiran-6.

=== American ===
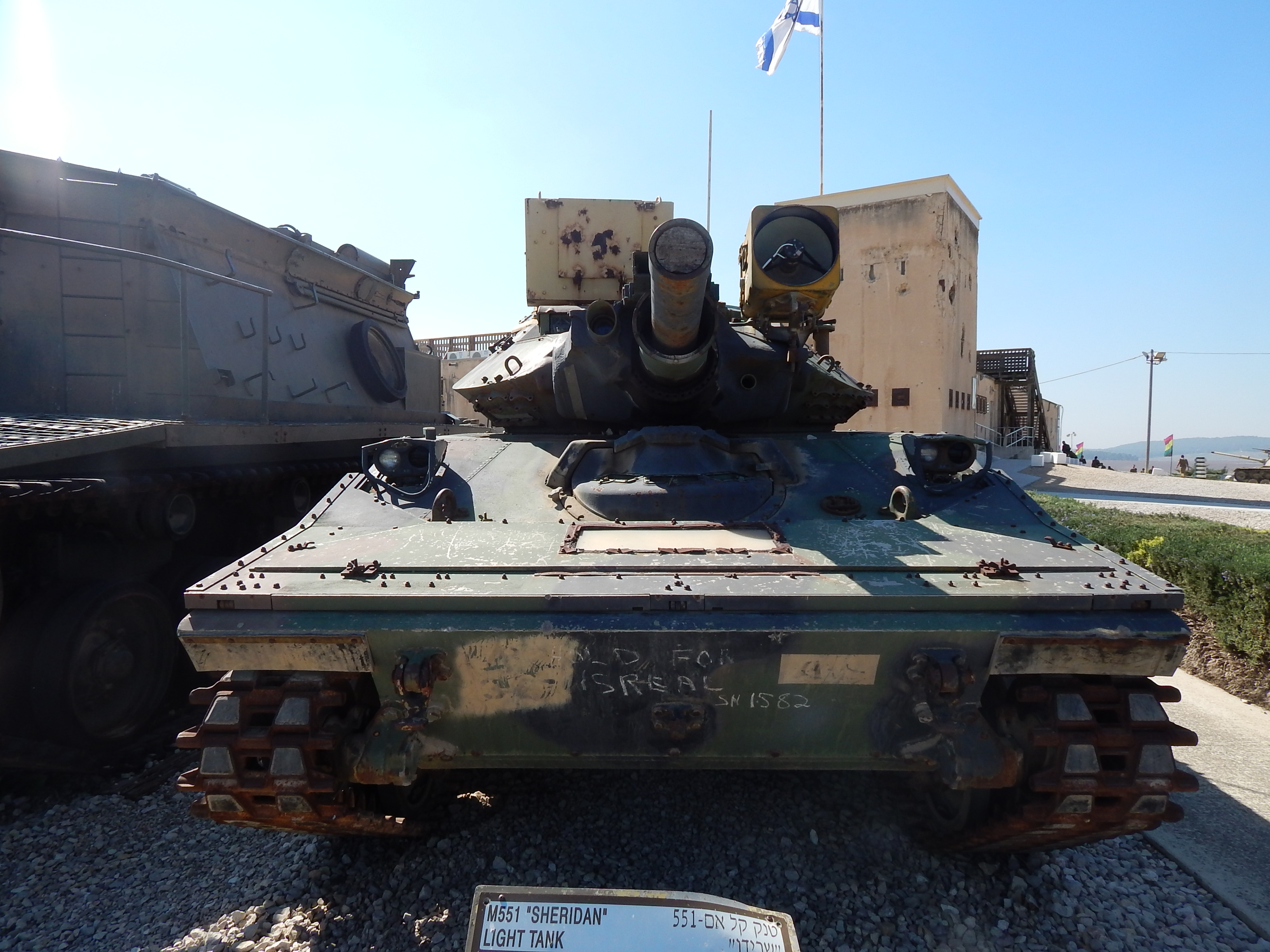
M551 Sheridan Light Tank

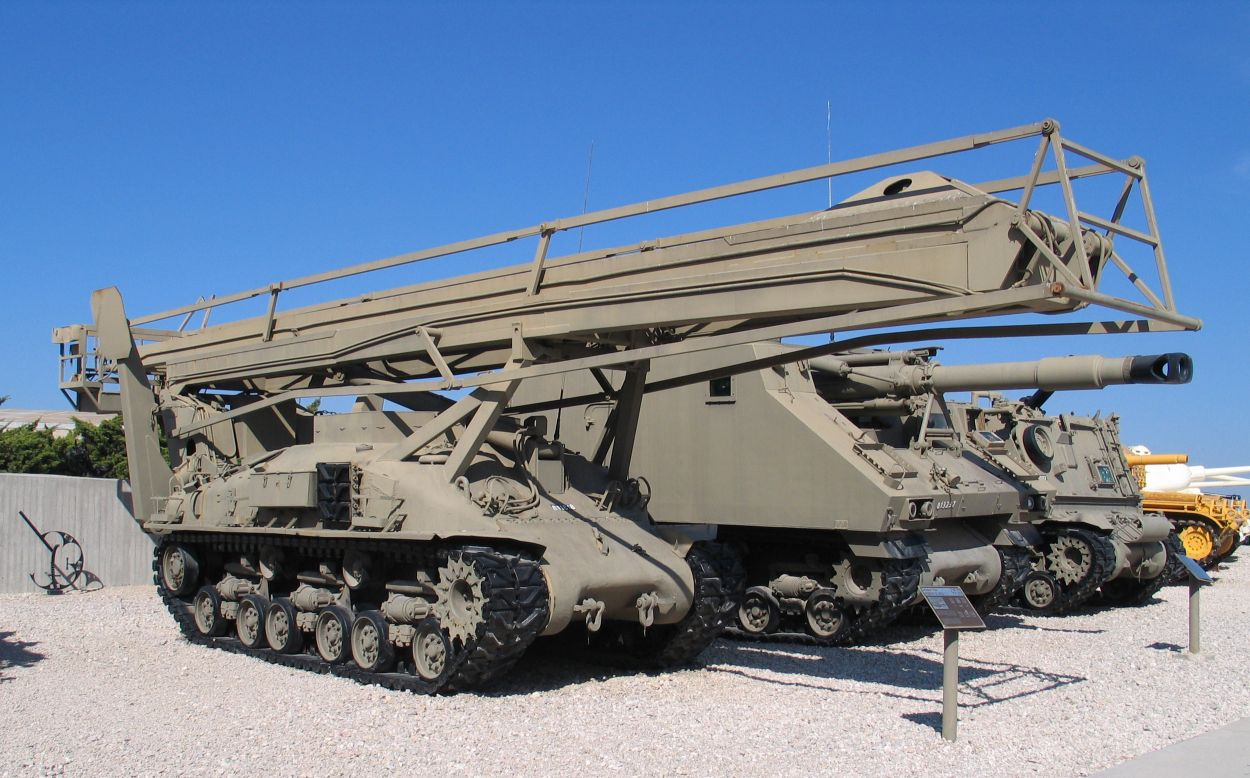
"Eyal observation post" Israeli adaptation of American M4 Sherman

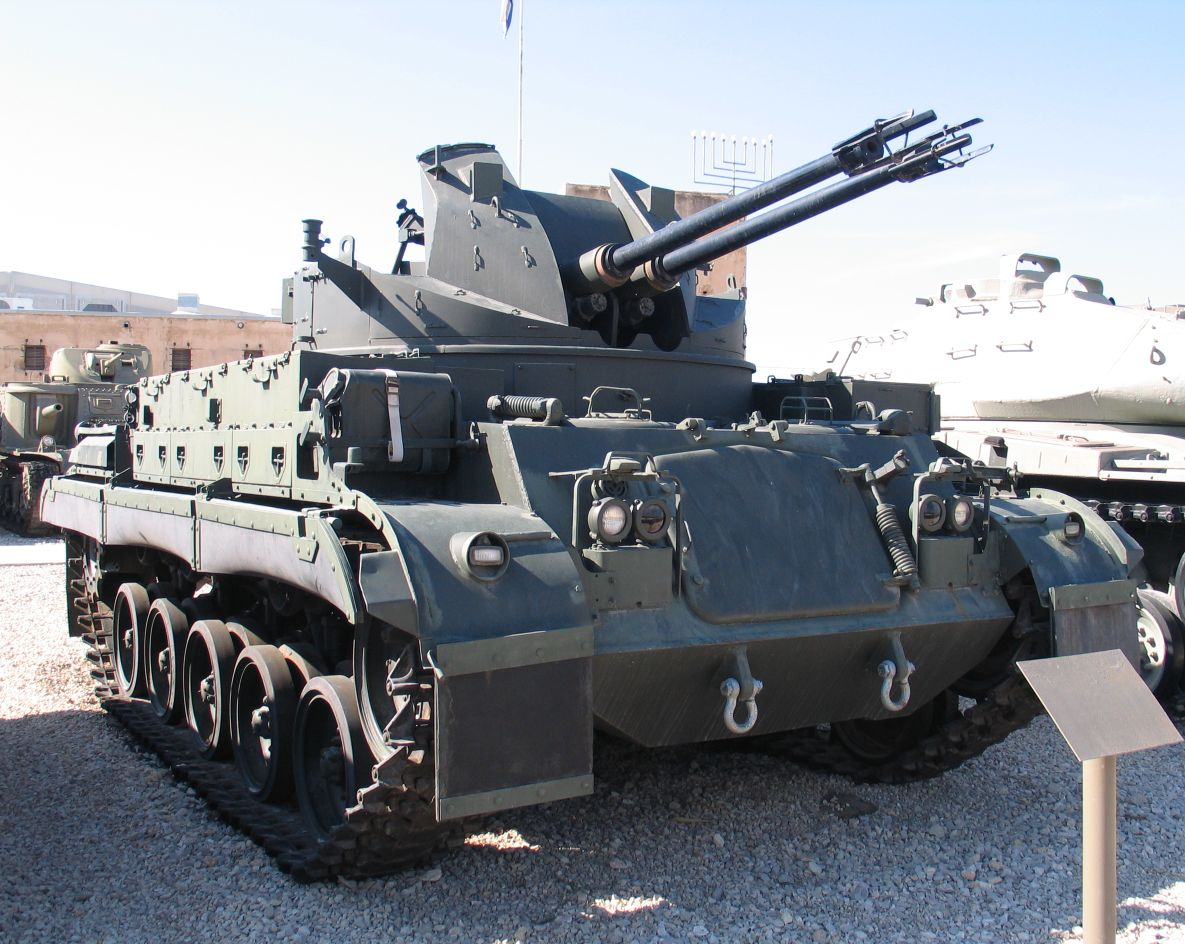
M42 Duster

- Diamond T truck
- M24 Chaffee
- M42 Duster
- M3 Lee
  - M3 Grant
- M3 Scout Car
- M3A1 Stuart
- M5A1 Stuart
- M41 Walker Bulldog
- M107 Self-Propelled Gun
- M113 Armored Personnel Carrier
  - M901 ITV
- M551 Sheridan
- M578 Light Recovery Vehicle
- M4 Sherman - several variations, including:
  - Ambutank (Sherman Medical Evacuation Tank)
  - Eyal observation post vehicle
  - M4 Dozer
  - M4A4 with FL-10 Turret (Egyptian variant)
  - M50 and M51 Super Sherman (Israeli Variant)
  - MAR-240
  - MAR-290
  - Sherman Crab
- M10 tank destroyer
- Patton tank variations, including:
  - M48 Patton
  - M60 Patton
  - Magach, improved Israeli versions of the M48 and the M60 - several variations
- US halftracks - several variations
- Willys MB jeep

=== British ===
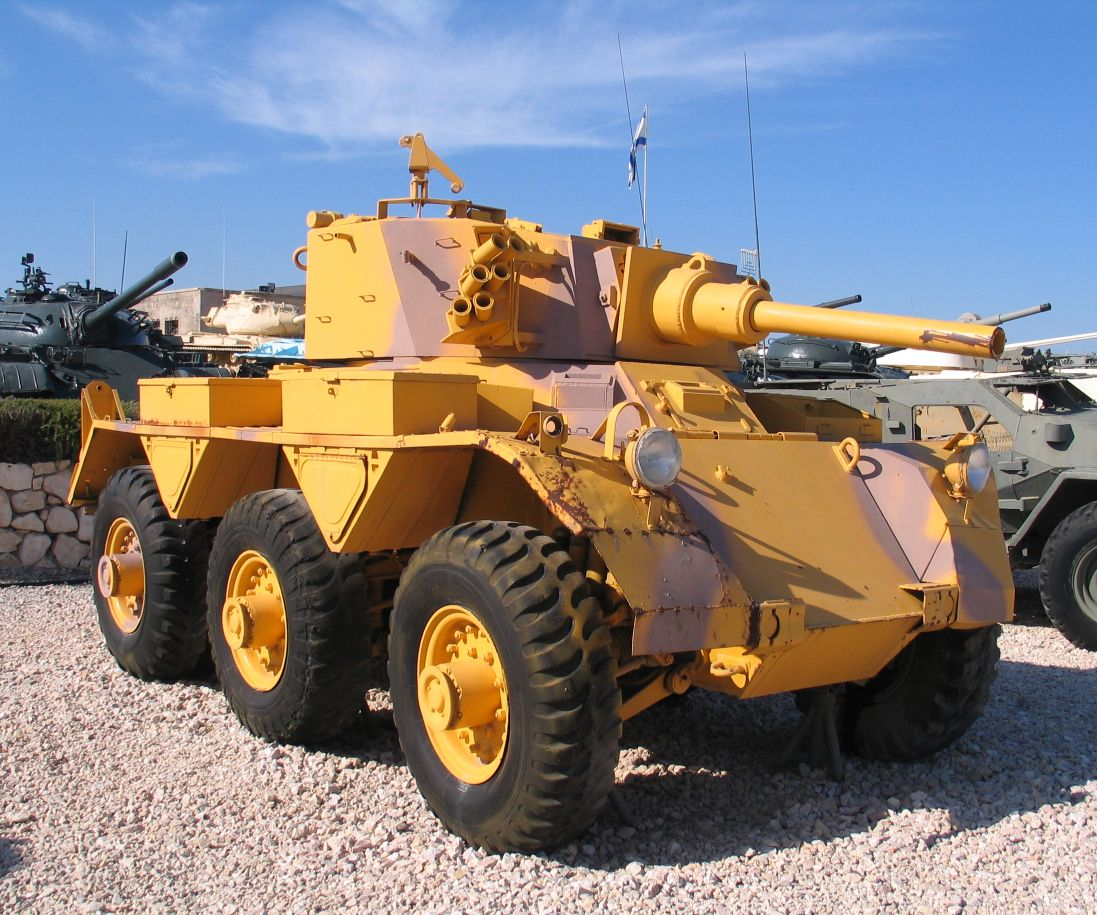
Alvis Saladin

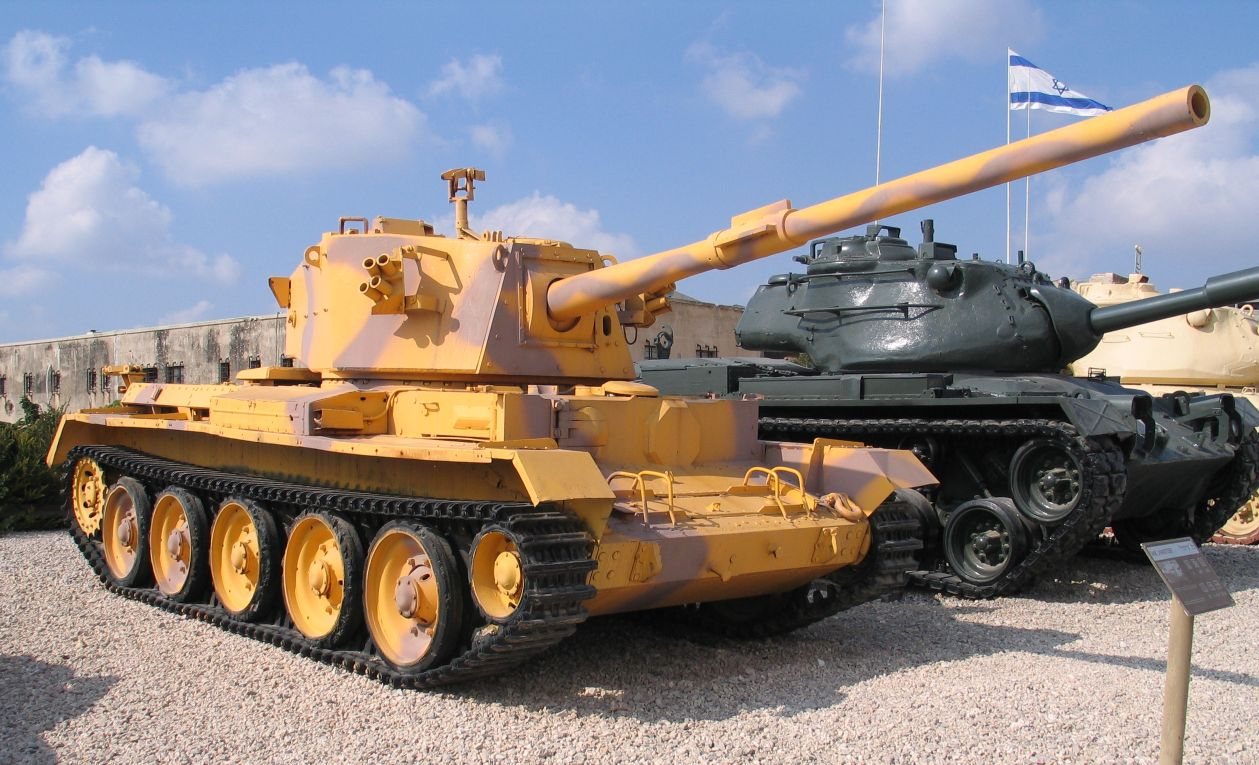
FV4101 Charioteer tank

- 17pdr SP Achilles
- Alvis Saladin
- Archer (tank destroyer)
- Cromwell tank
- FV 4101 Charioteer
- FV 4201 Chieftain
- Matilda tank
- Centurion tank - several variations, including:
  - Centurion Mk 5
  - Bridgelayer
  - Centurion BARV
  - Puma
  - Sho't
- Ferret armoured car
- Light Tank Mk VI (Vickers)
- Marmon-Herrington Armoured Car
- Scammell Contractor

=== French ===
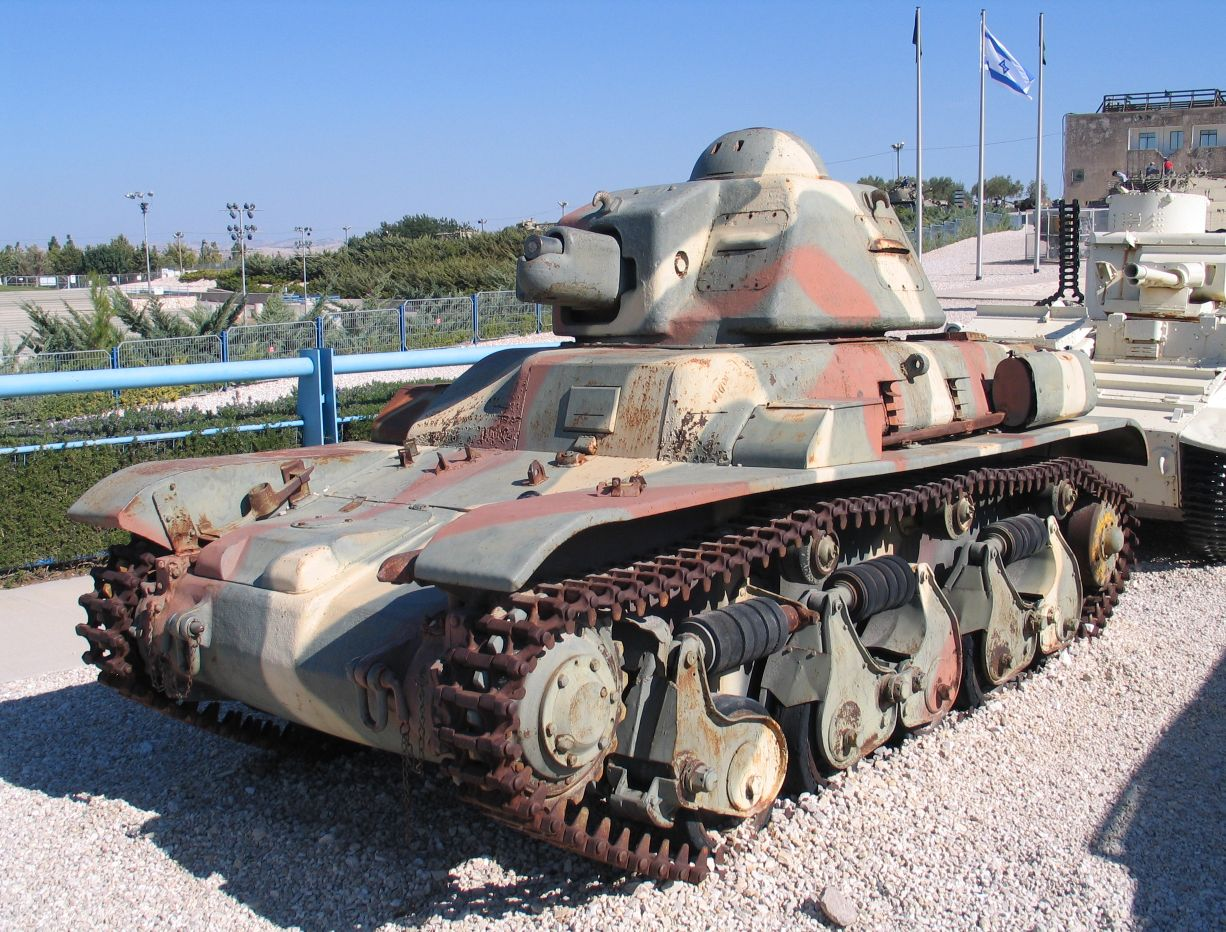
Renault R35 light tank

- AMX-13
- AMX-VCI
- Gillois amphibious tank-carrier, used by the IDF under the name "Timsach" in the Yom Kippur War
- Hotchkiss H35
- Panhard AML
- Renault R35

=== German ===
- Panzer 1962
- Leopard 1 tank
- (Removed German exhibits: Panzer IV and StuG III Ausf.G)

=== Soviet ===
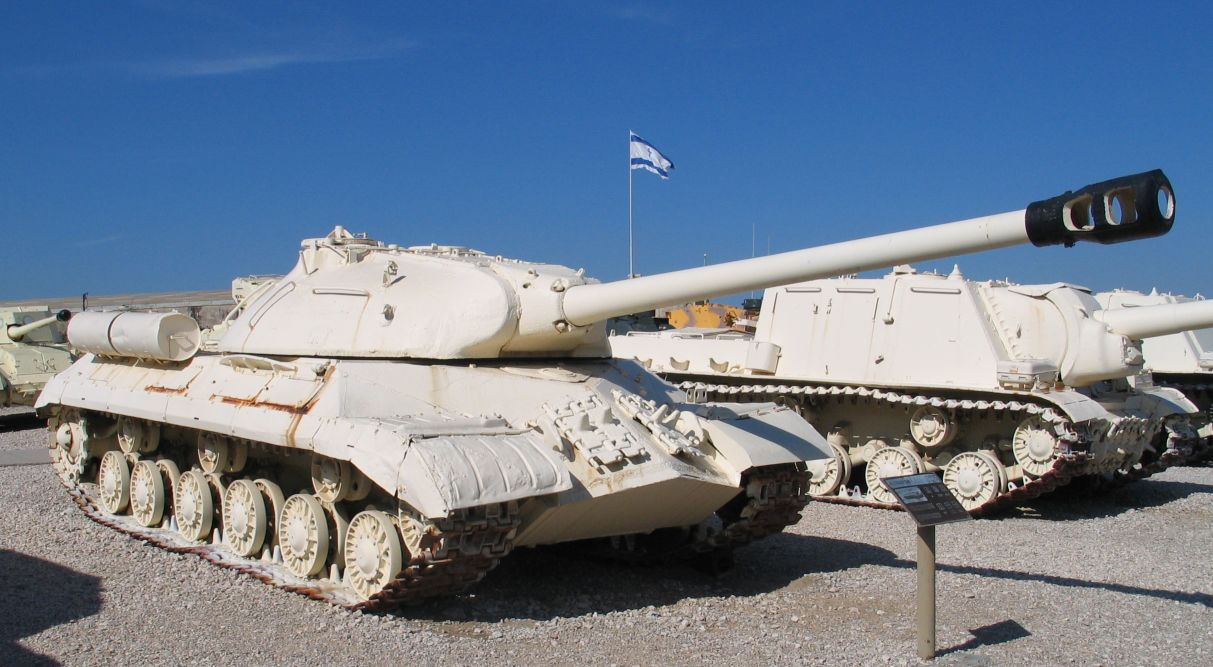
Captured Egyptian IS-3 heavy tank

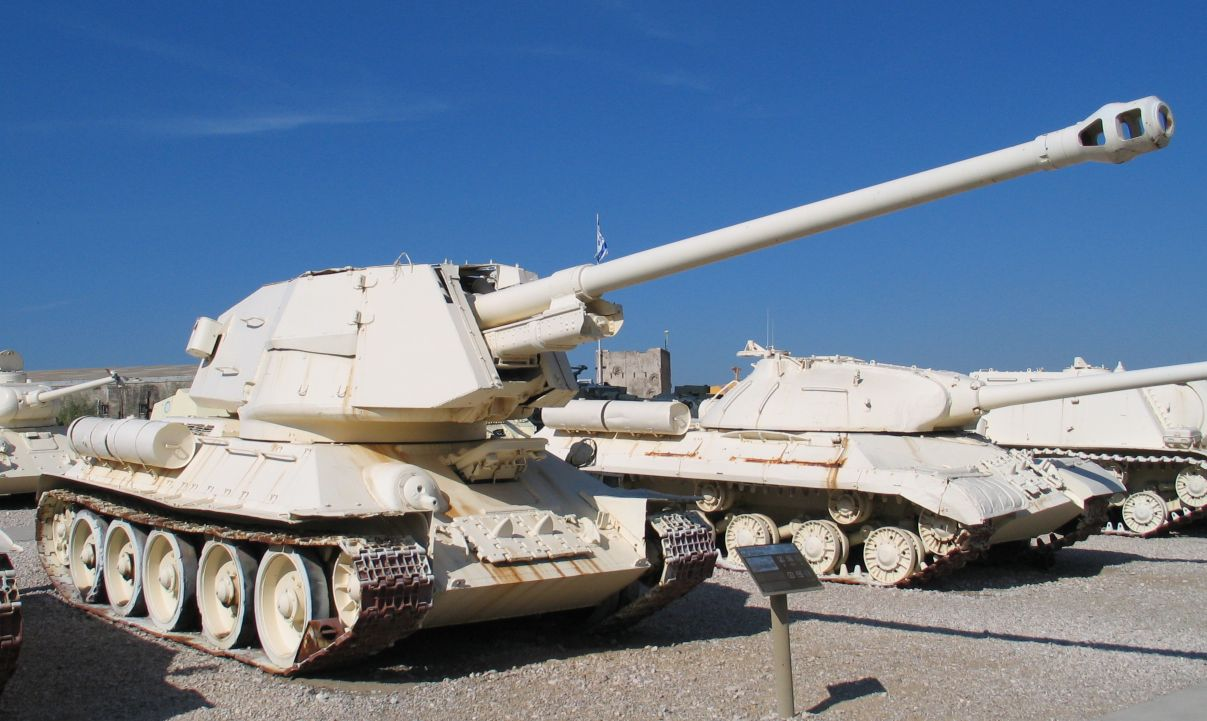
Captured Egyptian T-100

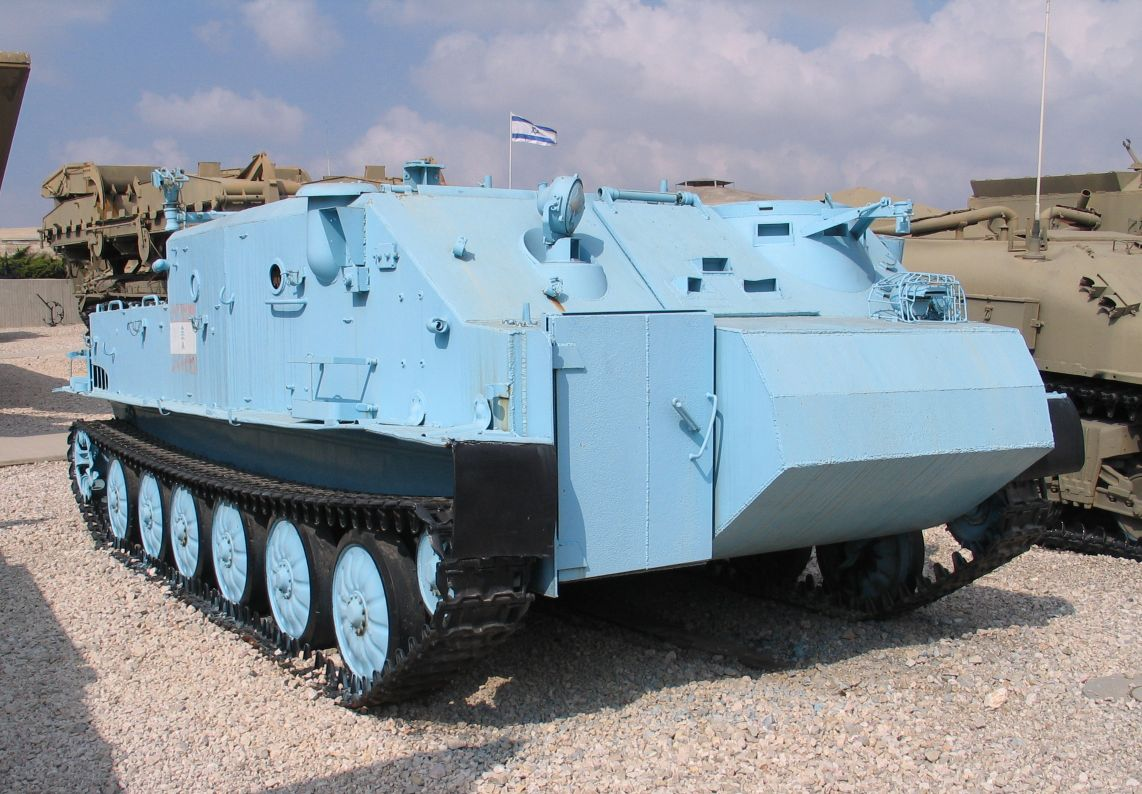
BTR-50-based Medevac vehicle

- BTR-40
- BTR-50
  - Improvised medevac version of BTR-50
- BTR-60
- BTR-152
  - Improvised recovery version of BTR-152
- BRDM-2 - several variations
- IS-3
- ISU-152
  - Recovery version of ISU-152
  - ISU-152 with gun removed, labeled as command vehicle
- PT-76
- T-34-85
  - T-34/100 or T-100 tank destroyer
- T-54/T-55 tanks - several variations, including:
  - IDF Achzarit
  - Tiran-4 - upgraded T-54
  - Tiran-5 - upgraded T-55
- T-62 (Israeli Tiran 6)
- T-72 MBT, from former East German Nationale Volksarmee
- ZSU-23-4
- ZSU-57-2

== Allied Forces Monument ==
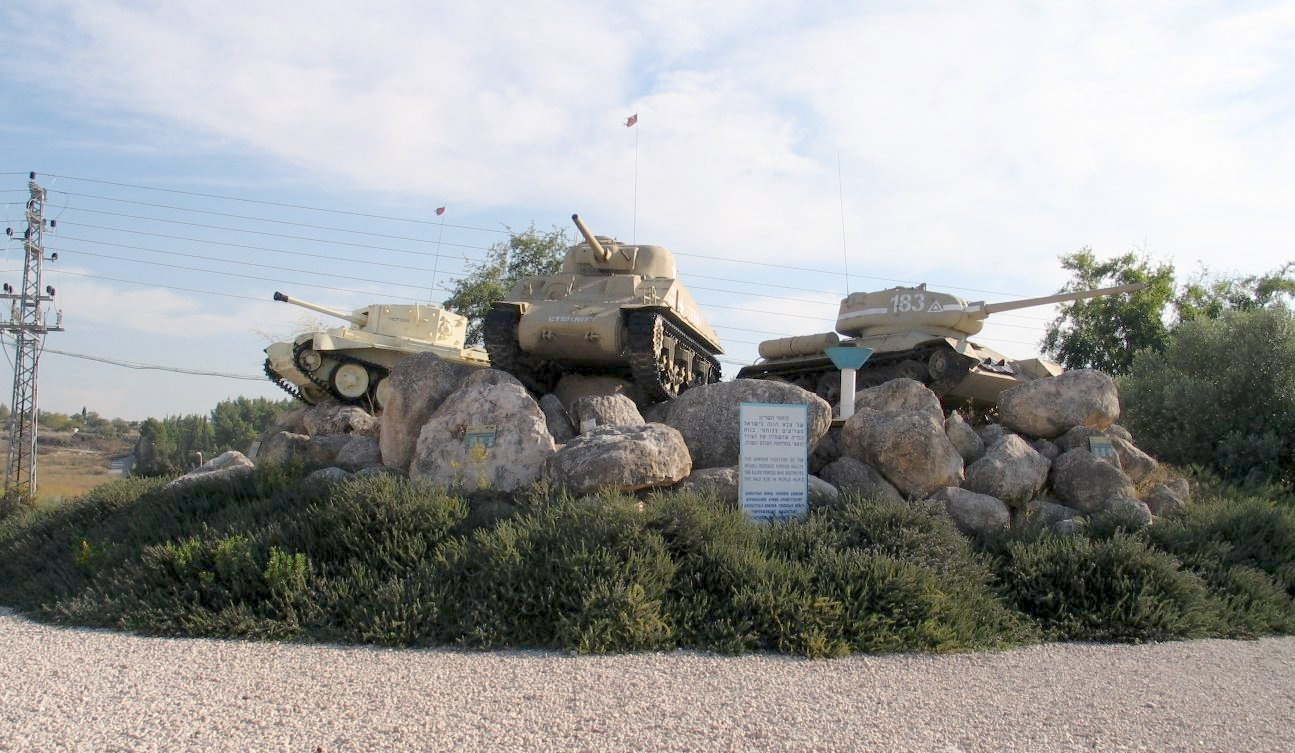
Allied Forces Monument at Yad La-Shiryon

A monument was constructed as a tribute to the Allies of World War II, led by the United States, Great Britain and The Soviet Union. The monument is composed of a rock pile, on top of which the three main battle tanks that served in the armies of the Allied Forces on different fronts: a British Cromwell, an American Sherman, and the Soviet T-34. The monument is surrounded by the flags of 19 countries and organizations that actively participated in the struggle, including the flag of the Jewish Brigade, which fought within the ranks of the British army. It is being reconstructed as of December 2011.

== Museum of Armored Corps History ==
The museum includes several exhibits dedicated to the history of armored combat in general, including:

- Model room with dozens of tanks
- Full-scale models of:
  - An armored knight
  - Assyrian and Egyptian chariots
  - Leonardo da Vinci's sketches of a proposed armed vehicle
- Stamp collection, featuring tanks and other armored vehicles

== Other features ==
The site also has a large outdoor theater where various ceremonies and performances take place, as it is one of the largest theaters in the country and centrally located. There is also a birdwatching facility equipped with a radar to track migratory birds.

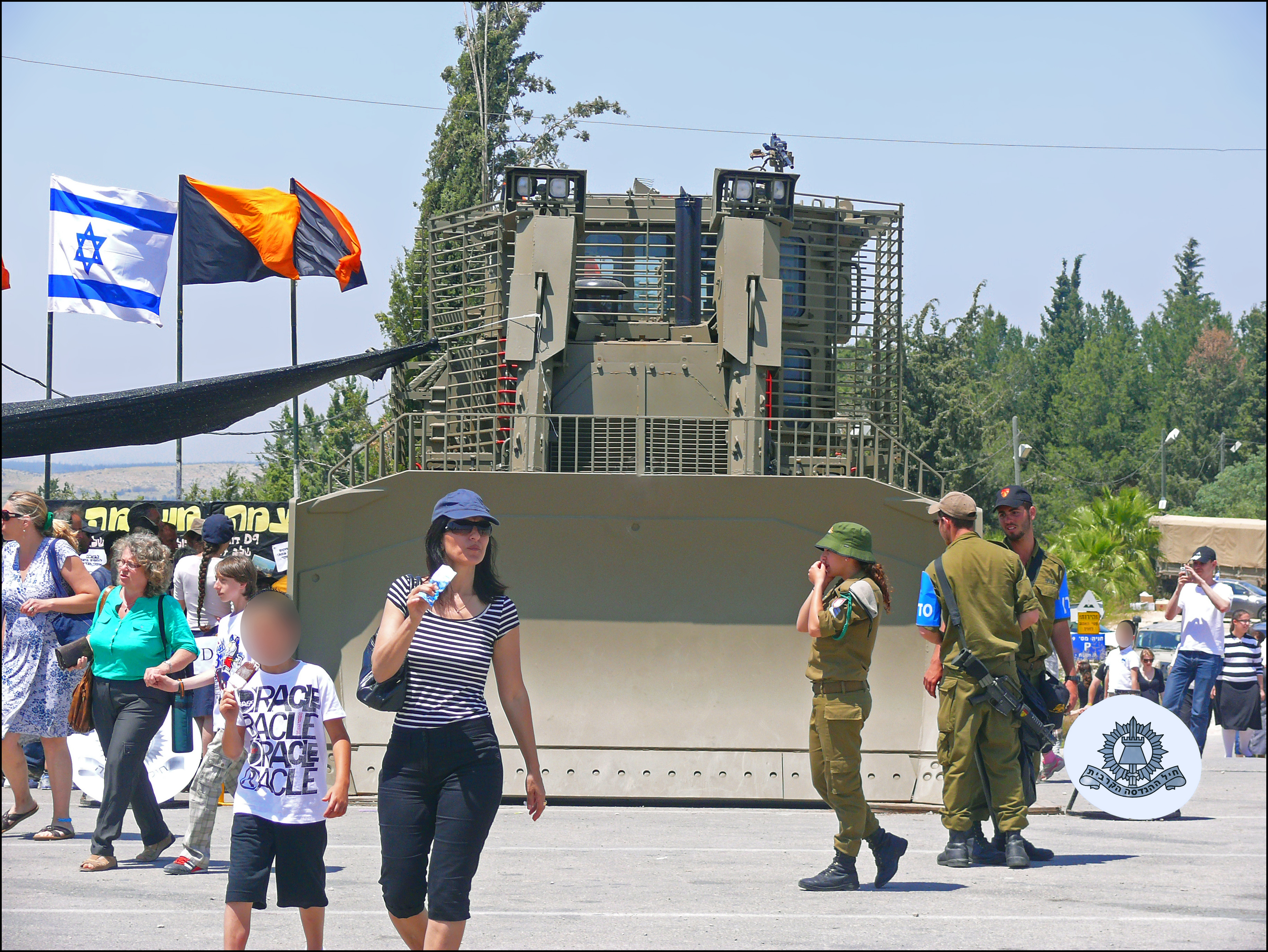
IDF Caterpillar D9 armored bulldozer at an IDF Ground Command (Army) exhibition on Yom Ha'atzmaut 2012

== See also: other tank museums ==
- France: Musée des Blindés
- Germany: Deutsches Panzermuseum
- Germany: Wehrtechnische Studiensammlung
- Iran: Holy Defense Museum
- Jordan: Royal Tank Museum
- Poland: Polish Army Museum – large collection of Soviet, western and Polish AFVs
- Russia: Kubinka Tank Museum
- Slovenia: Park vojaške zgodovine Pivka - large collection of US, USSR, and Yugoslav armour and other army equipment (including a submarine)
- United Kingdom: The Tank Museum
- USA: American Heritage Museum
- USA: Patton Museum of Cavalry and Armor
