= Nimda Shoet =

Israeli personnel carrier

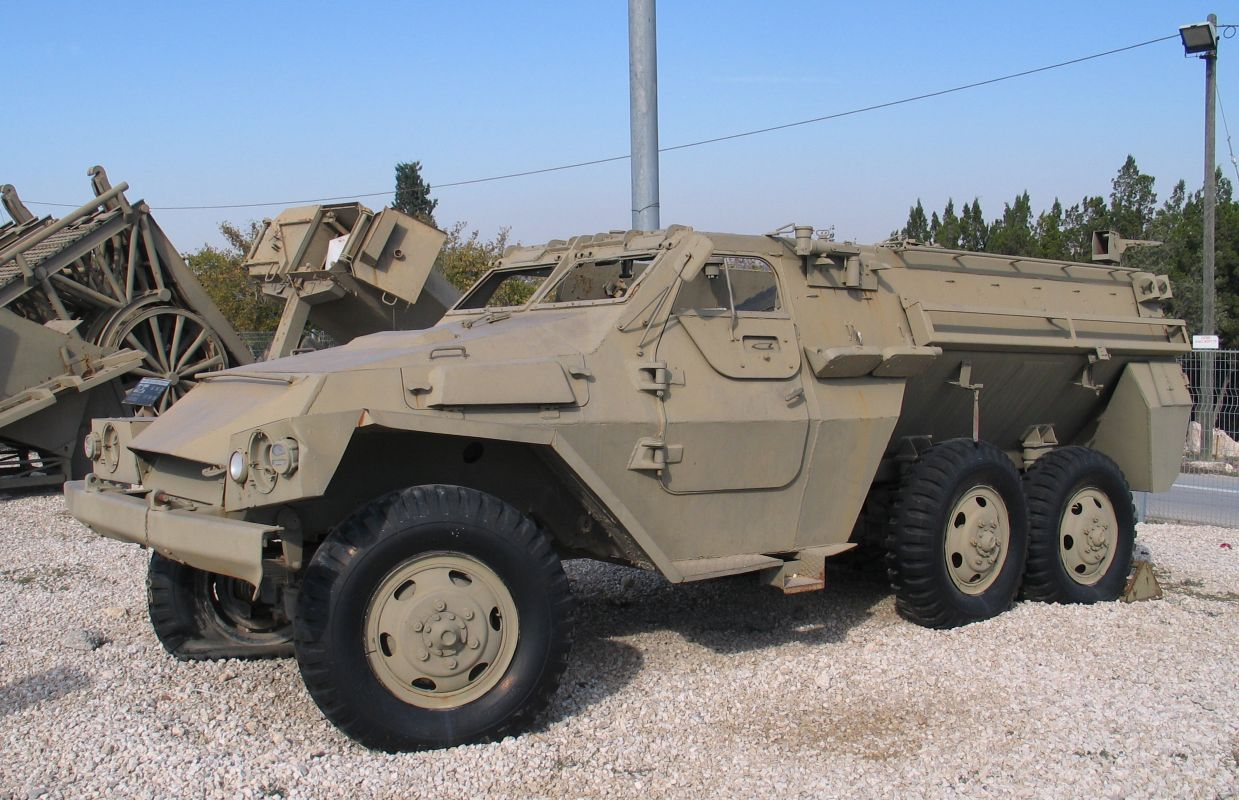
Shoet in Yad La-Shiryon museum, Israel.

Shoet is a six-wheeled Israeli armored personnel carrier developed by Nimda Group, loosely modeled after the Soviet BTR-152. The vehicle passed tests with the Israel Defense Forces, but didn't reach production.

Shoet weighs about 8 tonnes, is protected by 8 to 14 mm sloped armor. The powerpack consists of 172 hp GMC 6-cylinder V-53 engine and Allison MT-643 automatic hydromech torque converter transmission.
