= Wolfgang Engels =

Escapee to West Berlin

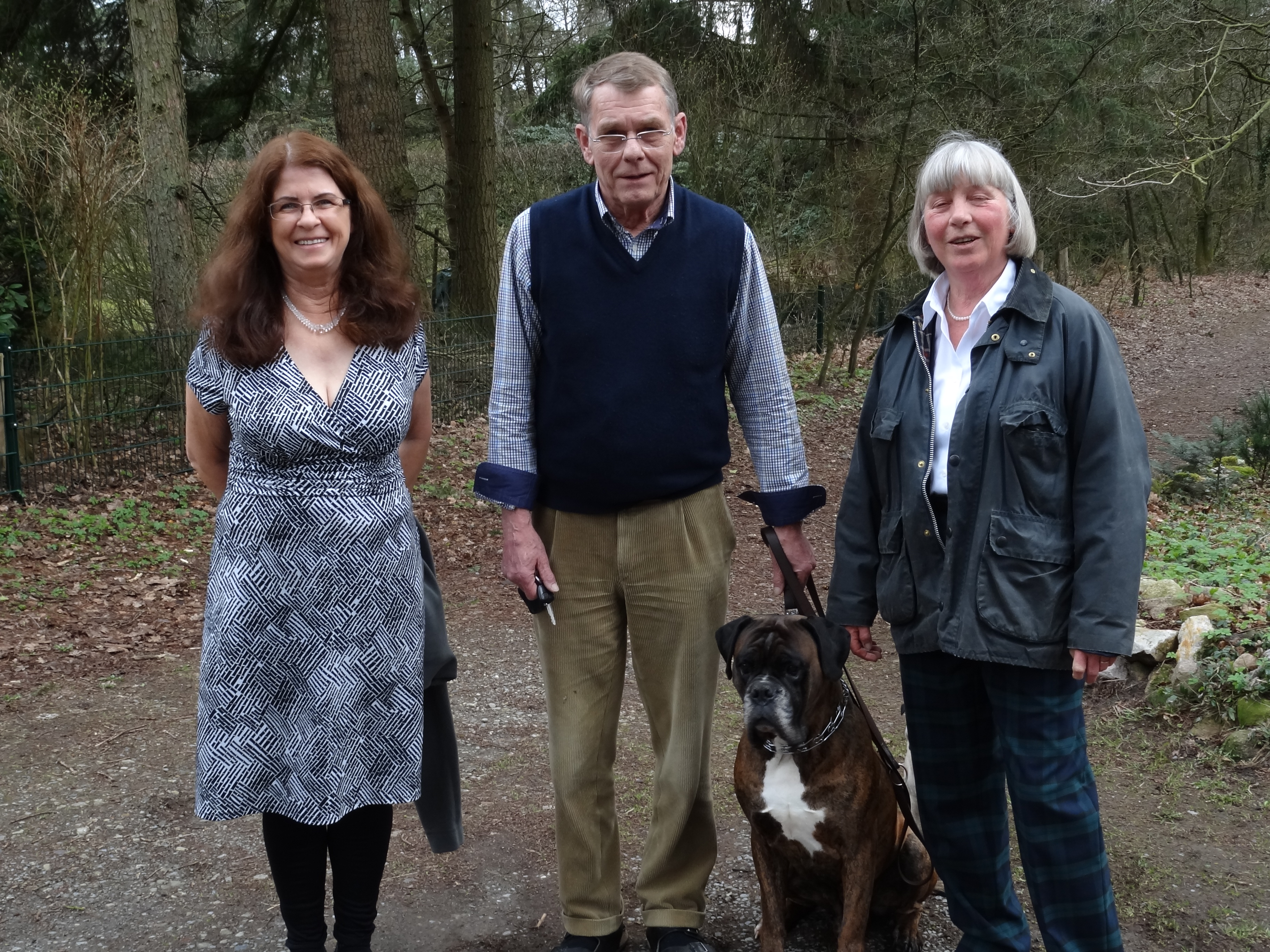
- Joline Albaugh, Wolfgang and Doris Engels during 50th Anniversary Celebration of his escape from East Berlin.
- Born: 1943 (age 82–83); Düsseldorf
- Occupations: Biology and History Teacher in Soltau; Car Mechanic and Driver in East German National People's Army (1960-1963)
- Known for: escape to West Germany by breaking through the Berlin Wall with armoured personnel carrier

Wolfgang Engels (born 1943) is a former civilian employee of the East German National People's Army, employed as a car mechanic and driver, who in 1963 used a stolen BTR-152 armoured personnel carrier to escape to West Germany by breaking through the Berlin Wall.

== Escape to West Germany ==
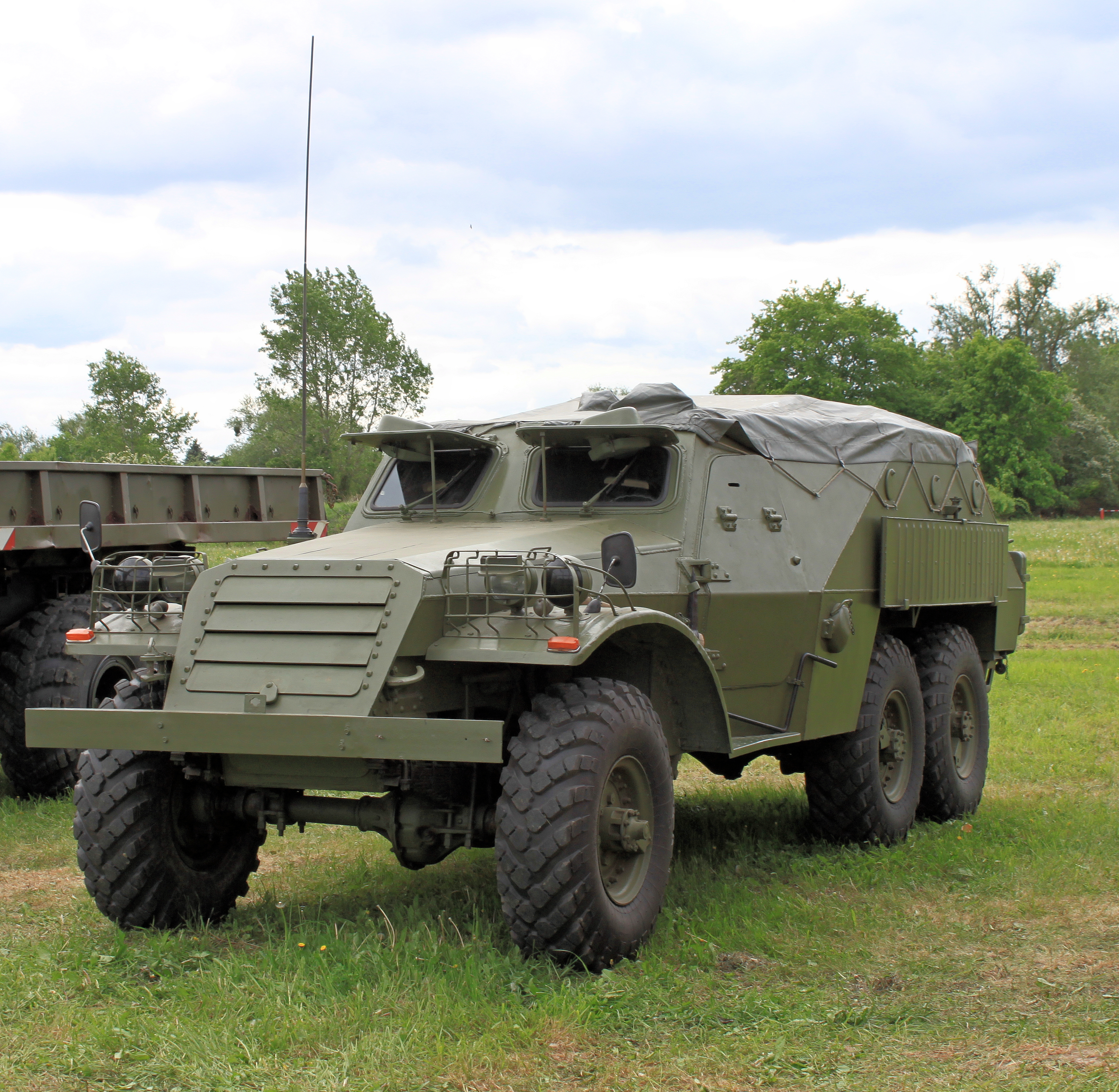
BTR-152, the model of vehicle that was used by Engels in his escape.

On 17 April 1963, on the eve of the communist May Day celebrations, Engels stole an East German National People's Army BTR-152 armoured personnel carrier from his military-base while its crew were at lunch and drove it through the streets of East Berlin. The police were used to seeing military vehicles and stopped traffic at intersections to allow him to cross. Along his route he saw a group of young people and stopped to offer them a ride "I'm going to the West, does anyone want to go?" but they declined his offer so he drove on and rammed it into the Berlin Wall in an attempt to escape to West Berlin.

The APC did not fully penetrate the Wall, having been stuck halfway on the fortified border, so Engels hurriedly exited the vehicle and was shot twice by East German border-guards while struggling to free himself from the rolls of razor-sharp barbed wire until he was finally pulled to safety by West Berliners. A passing West German policeman, having seen the commotion, retaliated by opening fire on the East German border-guards shooting at Engels, who was then taken to a nearby bar and laid on a table. As he recovered consciousness, he saw the labels on the liquor bottles and then knew that he had made a successful escape. Engels was rushed to a West Berlin Hospital where he underwent surgery for his wounds, performed by an eminent surgeon who, coincidentally, was at the same hospital being treated for his broken leg.

Wolfgang then recovered in the Berlin hospital. He settled down in West Germany and later became a teacher of biology and history in the town of Soltau. While he managed to escape to West Germany and gain his freedom, he ended up losing touch with his mother, who, being a dedicated communist, rejected him as a traitor to East Germany and denounced his escape.

== See also ==
- Jutta Fleck

== Literature ==
- Hans-Hermann Hertle: Die Berliner Mauer. Monument des Kalten Krieges = The Berlin wall. Ch. Links Verlag, Berlin 2007, ISBN 3-86153-463-0, p. 72.
