= BTR-152 =

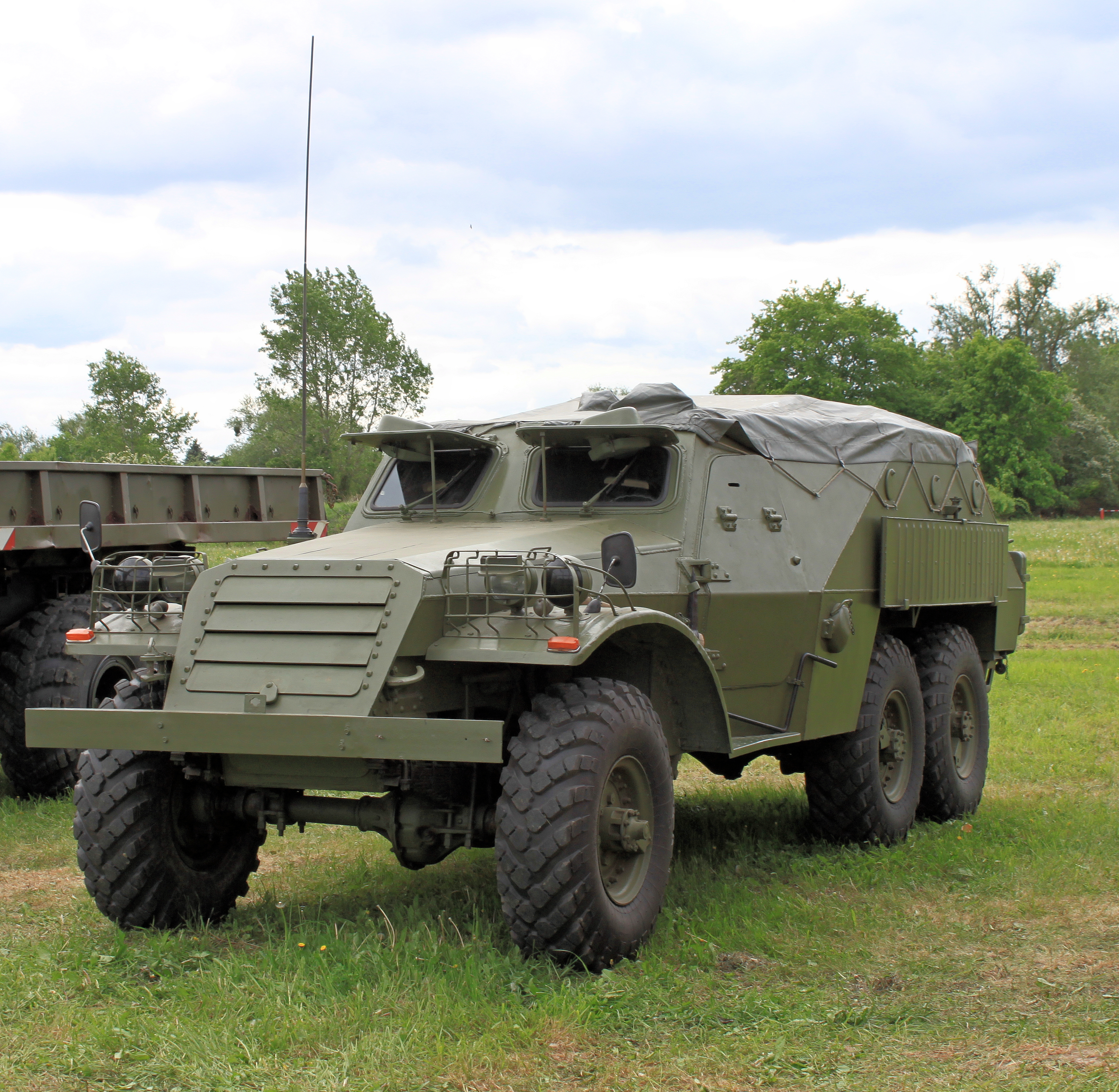
- Former East German BTR-152 (SPW-152) at a public exhibit.
- Type: Armoured personnel carrier
- Place of origin: Soviet Union

Service history
- In service: 24 March 1950 – present
- Used by: See Operators
- Wars: See Service History

Production history
- Designer: B. M. Fitterman
- Designed: November 1946 – 1949
- Manufacturer: Automotive Factory No. 2 Zavod imeni Stalina (until 1956); Automotive Factory No. 2 Zavod imeni Likhacheva (from 1956 to 1962)
- Unit cost: US$39,000 (export price to Iraq, 1964-1969)
- Produced: 1950–1959
- No. built: 8,600
- Variants: See Variants

Specifications
- Mass: 9.91 tonnes
- Length: 6.55 m 6.83 m for BTR-152V
- Width: 2.32 m
- Height: 2.04 m (without the mg); 2.36 m (with the mg); 2.41 m (BTR-152V with the mg)
- Crew: 2 (+18 passengers)
- Armor: welded steel 15 mm front 9 mm sides and rear 10 mm roof 4 mm bottom
- Main armament: 7.62mm SGMB light machine gun (1,250 rounds) (12.7 mm DShK 1938/46 heavy machine gun (500 rounds) can be used instead)
- Secondary armament: 2×7.62mm SGMB light machine guns (1,250–1,750 rounds) on side pintel mounts (optional)
- Engine: ZIS-123 6-cylinder in-line water-cooled petrol (for variants based on ZIS-151); ZIL-137K 6-cylinder in-line petrol (for variants based on ZIL-157); 110 hp (82 kW) at 3,000 rpm. (for variants based on ZIS-151); 107 hp (80 kW) (for variants based on ZIL-157)
- Power/weight: 11.1 hp/tonne (8.3 kW/tonne); 10.8 hp/tonne (8.1 kW/tonne) for BTR-152V
- Suspension: wheeled 6×6 front - 2 leaf springs and hydraulic shock absorbers. rear - equalising type with 2 leaf springs and torsion bars.
- Ground clearance: 300 mm
- Fuel capacity: 300 L (79 gal)
- Operational range: 650 km (404 miles)
- Maximum speed: 75 km/h 65 km/h for BTR-152V

The BTR-152 is a six-wheeled Soviet armoured personnel carrier (APC) built on the chassis and drive train of a ZIS-151 utility truck. It entered service with a number of Warsaw Pact member states beginning in 1950, and formed the mainstay of Soviet motor rifle battalions until the advent of the amphibious BTR-60 series during the 1960s. BTR stands for bronetransportyor (Russian: бронетранспортёр, БТР, lit. 'armoured transporter').

BTR-152s were available in several marks, and were manufactured in large numbers for the Soviet military and export. Late production models utilized automotive components from the more reliable ZIL-157 truck. Three primary variants of the BTR-152 appeared between 1950 and 1959: the base armoured personnel carrier with a single pintle-mounted 7.62mm or 12.7mm machine gun, an unarmed command vehicle with a higher roofline, and an anti-aircraft variant armed with a ZPU-2 mount. BTR-152s could carry a single infantry squad each, or specialist weapons teams along with their mortars and anti-tank equipment. In Soviet service, a number were also deployed as artillery tractors.

== History ==
=== Development ===
During World War II, Red Army tacticians favored combined arms offensives, which emphasized the deployment of light infantry in concert with tanks. However, the Soviet infantrymen lacked the armored protection and rapid mobility of the tanks, and remained comparatively vulnerable to enemy fire.

By the end of the war, the initial Soviet tactic of tank desant, in which the infantry rode into battle atop the tanks they were supporting, had been superseded by the introduction of M3 Half-tracks and M3 White armored cars. These were widely used for troop transport, giving rise to a new doctrine in which armored vehicles capable of keeping pace with tanks brought infantry to an engagement. The infantrymen would then disembark and enter combat on foot.

Wartime experiences demonstrated that the Red Army had an urgent postwar requirement for more wheeled armored vehicles, and the general staff specified a new reconnaissance vehicle and armored personnel carrier (APC). The APC had to be capable of transporting at least eight troops. A new design bureau at the Gorkovsky Avtomobilny Zavod (GAZ) was set up to study potential concepts accordingly; their final prototype, the Izdeliye 141 (BTR-40), was accepted into service but was regarded as too small to be used in an APC role. Meanwhile, specifications for another APC had been issued, capable of seating 15 to 20 additional passengers and armed with a single heavy machine gun. Existing M3 half-tracks and captured German Sd.Kfz. 251s were studied as potential references for the upcoming design.

Concept work on the new APC began at the Zavod imeni Stalina (ZIS) factory in Moscow, overseen by Soviet engineer Boris Mikhailovich Fitterman, at roughly the same time the Izdeliye 141 was being developed by GAZ. Prototypes were built with automotive components from the ZIS-151 production line; however, the APC chassis incorporated a more powerful engine and a shorter wheelbase than its utility truck counterpart. Design work was carried out by a team of five ZIS employees: Fitterman, K. M. Androsov, A. P. Petrenko, V. F. Rodionov and P. P. Chernyaev. The final prototype was trialed by the Soviet Armed Forces in December 1949 and accepted into service as the BTR-152. Serial production of the BTR-152 under the manufacturer's code ZIS-152 commenced around mid 1950, making it the first mass-produced Soviet APC. Despite being designed around the same time, the BTR-40 did not enter serial production until the end of the year.

The BTR-152 was used by the Soviet military as a command and communications vehicle, fire support vehicle, artillery tractor, and general transporter. Being open-topped, the BTR-152's crew was vulnerable to indirect fire. In later years, the vehicle was not ideal for the prospect of a major conventional war in Europe either, as it lacked amphibious capability or NBC countermeasures. However, these early BTRs remained effective as a low-cost option that allowed the Soviets to rapidly motorize their existing infantry divisions. A program in the late 1950s looked at ways to replace the BTR-152 with a more sophisticated APC utilizing a purpose-designed, amphibious chassis. As the BTR-152's six-wheeled configuration was deemed insufficient to reduce ground pressure on the tires and produce optimal cross-country performance, Soviet engineers embarked on an eight-wheeled APC program, which resulted in the BTR-60.

Approximately 8,600 BTR-152s of all variants were manufactured in the Soviet Union, with some unlicensed copies being produced in the People's Republic of China as the Type 56. Soviet BTR-152s were produced between 1950 and 1959, being supplemented by the BTR-60 from 1960 onwards. As they became increasingly obsolescent, many were shipped to Soviet client states in Africa and the Middle East; the largest quantity of second-hand BTR-152s were accepted by Arab nations such as Libya, Iraq, Syria, and Egypt. Small quantities were also converted to armored ambulances and combat engineering vehicles for the Soviet Army; these remained in service as late as the 1980s.

=== Service ===
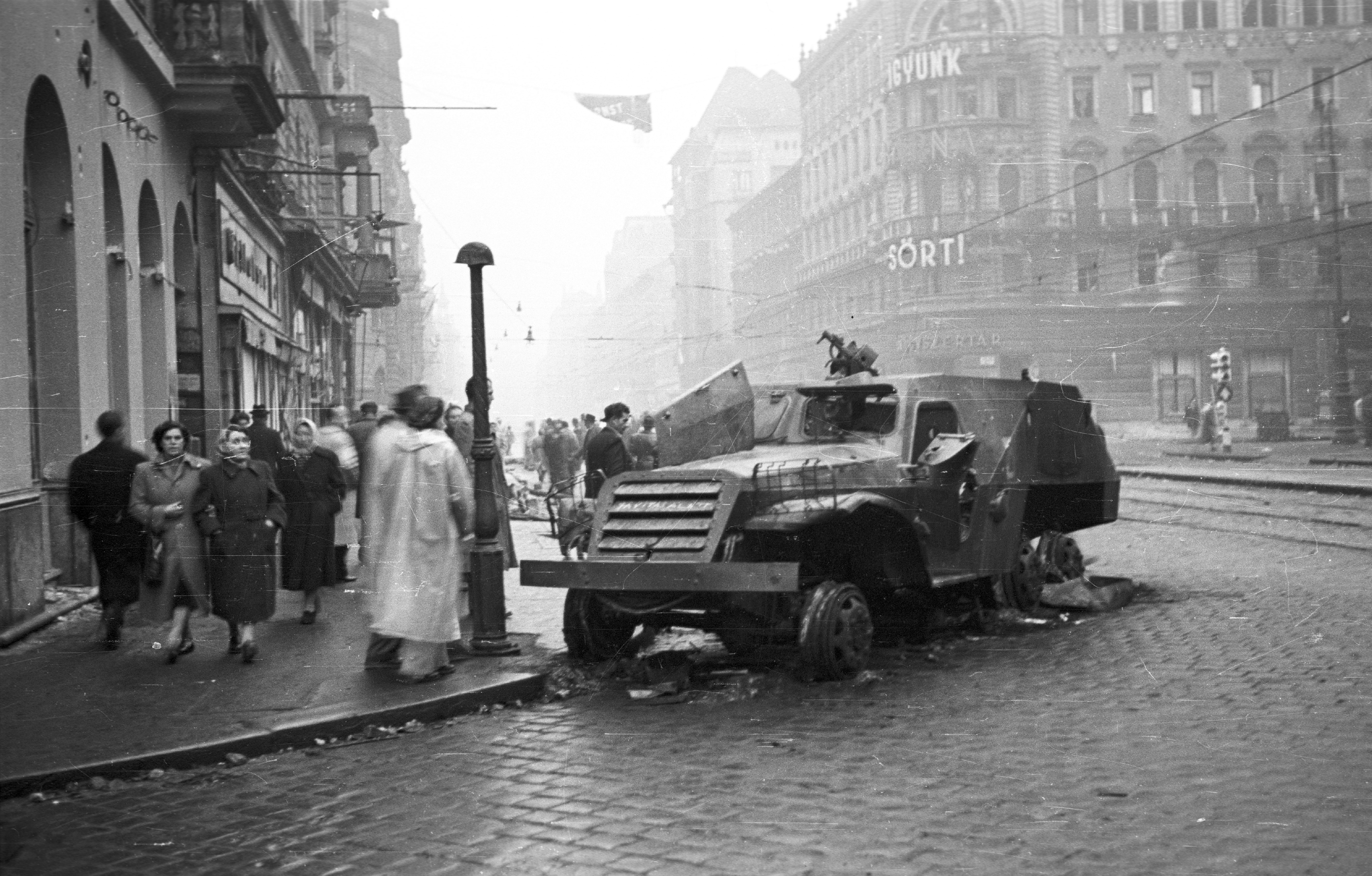
BTR-152 knocked out during the Hungarian Revolution of 1956.

BTR-152s first saw combat during the Hungarian Revolution of 1956, when they were deployed by the 12th Motorized Brigade of the Soviet Internal Troops to crush Hungary's fledgling uprising. The BTRs were deployed in Budapest and other settlements, as well as on the Hungarian border with Austria. A number were damaged or destroyed by insurgents armed with molotov cocktails, which were pitched into the open troop compartments without apparent difficulty. Since they were wheeled, some BTR-152s were also immobilized when their rubber tires caught fire, and had to be abandoned by their crews.

Egypt was one of the first major export customers for the BTR-152 outside Eastern Europe; in 1954, it ordered 200 from the Soviet Union, and between 1961 and 1966 it received another 600 in second-hand condition, possibly as military aid. Syria likewise received at least 200 BTR-152s in 1966, and another 300 three years later. These were deployed against the Israel Defense Forces during the Six-Day War. In Syrian service, they were utilized as makeshift infantry fighting vehicles rather than APCs; infantrymen remained on board and used the BTR-152 as a firing platform rather than disembark and fight on foot. Nevertheless, failure to coordinate combined arms maneuvers often left the Syrian motorized infantry separated from their supporting tank formations and vulnerable to Israeli heavy armor. Israel captured over 1,000 BTR-152s from Arab armies during the Six-Day War and the subsequent Yom Kippur War.

BTR-152s were deployed by the National Liberation Front of Chad (FROLINAT) during the First Chadian Civil War, and were instrumental in a motorized assault on Salal in April 1978. The BTRs were knocked out by Panhard AML-90 armored cars of the French Foreign Legion. Libyan mechanized battalions also deployed BTR-152s in Chad during the Chadian-Libyan conflict, often in concert with tank companies or EE-9 Cascavels. Several were destroyed after taking direct hits from AML-90 cannon fire or SS.11 anti-tank missiles.

BTR-152s formed the mainstay of mechanized units on both sides during the Ogaden War. The Somali National Army ordered enough BTR-152s from the Soviet Union in the late 1960s to equip nine new mechanized battalions. About half of Somalia's BTR-152s appear to have been lost in the Ogaden conflict. Soviet weapons deliveries to Ethiopia accelerated after the outbreak of war, and starting in March 1977 included 40 BTR-152s appropriated from the Soviet Army's reserve stocks. These vehicles were mostly BTR-152Vs but also included the BTR-152A anti-aircraft variant.

The Soviet Union donated at least six BTR-152s to Mozambique shortly after that country's independence in the mid-1970s. Mozambican BTR-152s were deployed against Rhodesian Security Forces conducting cross-border raids, as well as in search and destroy operations mounted near Mozambican National Resistance (RENAMO) strongholds. It is likely that all Mozambique's BTR-152s were eliminated by land mines or Rhodesian air strikes; they were not in service long before being superseded by the BTR-60. A second shipment of BTR-152s was delivered to the People's Forces of Liberation of Mozambique (FPLM) in 1983, but it remains unclear whether these were deployed in front-line service.

During the Lebanese Civil War, both Lebanese militias and Syrian Army used BTR-152s.

== Description ==
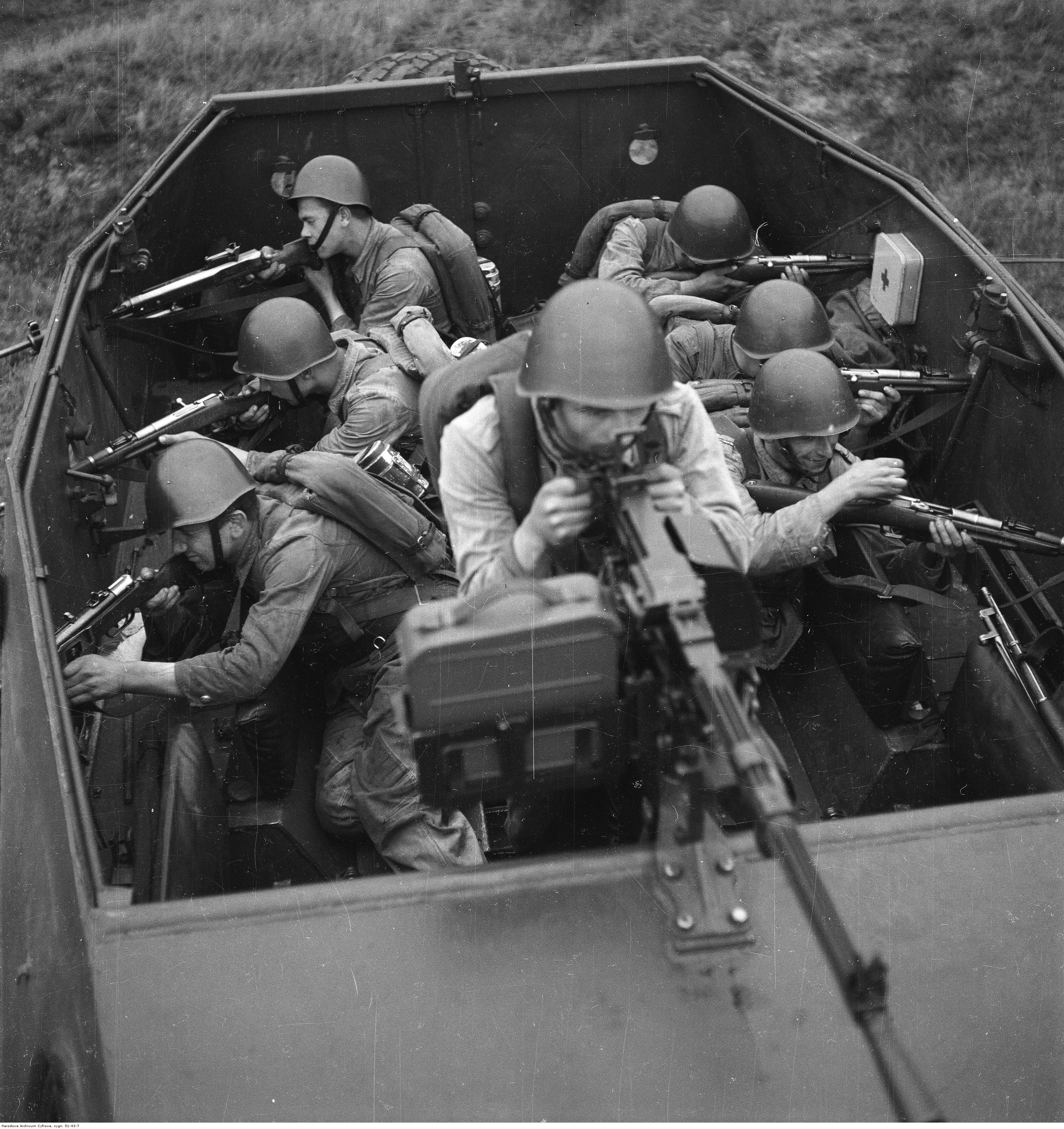
Troop seating in the BTR-152's rear compartment. Soldiers aim their individual weapons through firing ports.

The BTR-152 is a modified truck chassis with an armored hull and an open-topped troop compartment. The front suspension has been modified and has received shock absorbers from the ZIS-110. The sides and rear of the troop compartment are vertical, with corners sloping inwards to deflect shell fragments. There are firing ports on each side of the troop compartment and two rear doors for rapid debarking. Infantrymen can fire their individual weapons from the relative protection of the vehicle, and exit through these doors or by jumping over the sides. The crew consists of a driver and a single passenger, who operates the radios.

Two types of seating arrangements were available: the first consists of wooden benches on either side of the troop compartment facing inwards; the second consisted of three rows of seats facing forward. Both the driver and the radio operator seated to his right are provided with individual windscreens and, when in combat, these are covered by twin armored shutters with integral vision blocks. Crew members exit the vehicle through side doors, the tops of which are hinged and fold down for observation purposes.

The BTR-152's armor plate is fabricated of welded steel and ranges from 4 mm (0.16 in) to 13.5 mm (0.53 in) in thickness. This protects the crew and passengers from small arms fire, shell fragments, grenades, and anti-personnel mines, but is ineffective against larger shell fragments or even heavy machine gun fire. Late production hulls may have been manufactured from steel plate with a thickness of up to 15 mm (0.59 in). The vehicle is sometimes fitted with a winch that has a maximum capacity of 5 tonnes and a 70m cable. Depending on the variant, BTR-152s can tow field artillery, transport 1.9 tonnes of cargo, or carry a half platoon of infantry.

Most Soviet BTR-152s were powered by a six-cylinder ZIL-123 in-line water-cooled petrol engine developing 110 hp at 2,900 rpm. Those based on the chassis and components of the ZIL-157 utility truck utilized a slightly different ZIL-137K engine. There are several engine louvers on the front of the hull to prevent overheating; these could be safely closed for short intervals during combat, as long as the driver reduced speed and avoided overtaxing the vehicle. A BTR-152's gearbox comprised five forward gears and one reverse gear with a two-speed transfer box. Fifth gear had an overdrive. The suspension consisted of conventional leaf springs with hydraulic shock absorbers.

In the late 1950s, a little over 200 BTR-152s were produced with enclosed hulls, as opposed to the traditionally open-topped design; these were designated BTR-152K and BTR-152K1. They were also known unofficially as "BTR-152 Model D" or "BTR-152 M1961" by some Warsaw Pact armies. The enclosed hull reduced situational awareness but allowed for the installation of central heating and an NBC overpressure system. Two hatches opening to the right were installed on the new roofline.

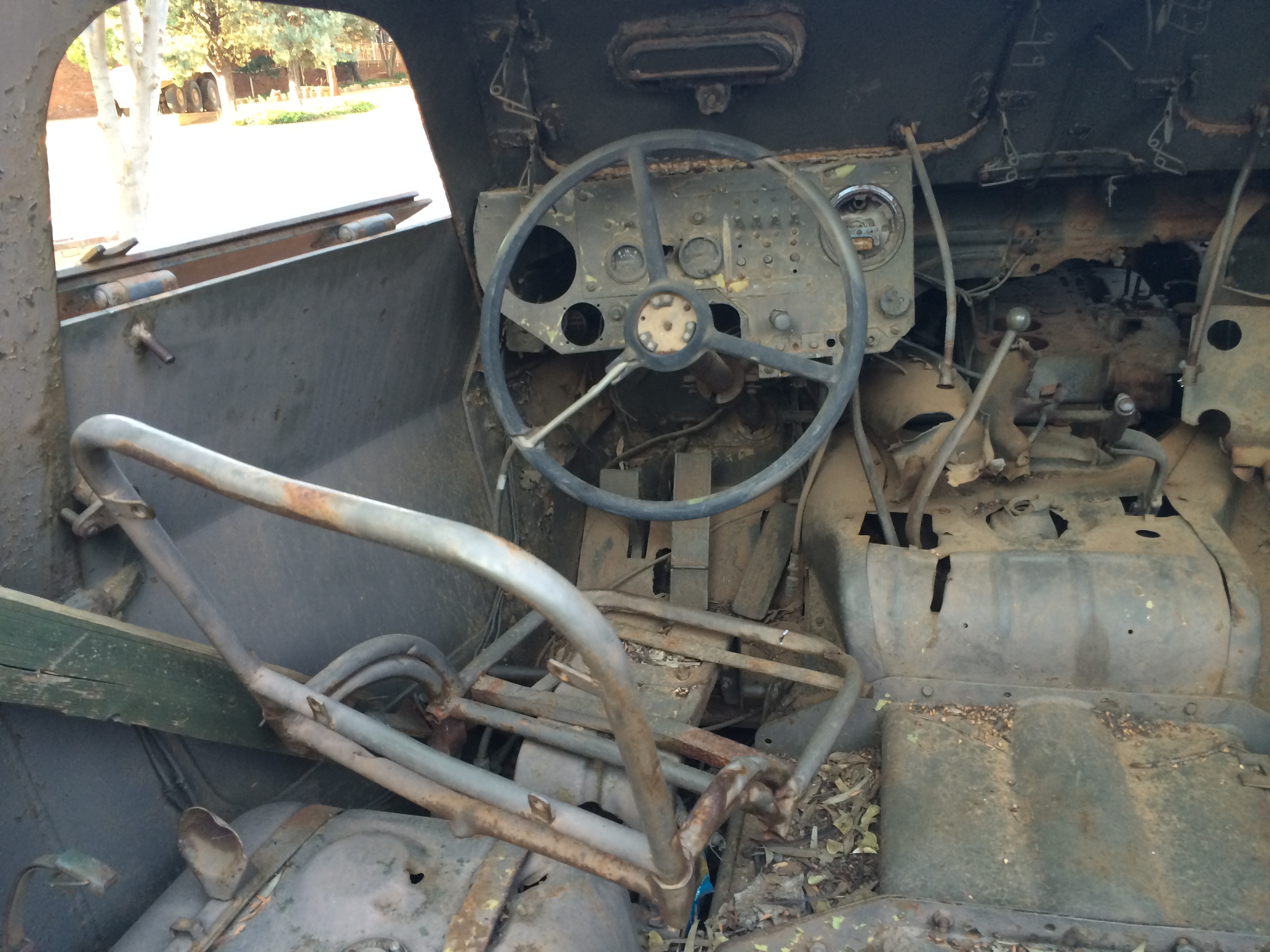
Driver's position in a BTR-152.

The BTR-152 was originally armed with a single pintle-mounted 7.62mm SG-43 Goryunov (SGMB) medium machine gun, fed by 1,250 rounds of stored on-board ammunition. This was mounted behind the driving position. Additional 7.62mm general-purpose machine guns could be mounted on either side of the hull top as needed. The SGMB machine gun could traverse 45 degrees and elevate between -6 and +24 degrees. Some of the BTRs were fitted with single 12.7mm DShK or 14.5mm KPV heavy machine guns in place of the SGMB. Vehicles designated BTR-152A were ground support vehicles with limited air defense capability. BTR-152As carried twin KPVs in a ZPU-2 anti-aircraft mount. Variations included an Egyptian model with a Czechoslovak M53 Quad mounting for four DShKs, which were normally towed on a two-wheeled trailer, and some modified by the Palestine Liberation Organization to accept 23mm ZU-23-2 anti-aircraft guns.

Because the original BTR-152 utilized the chassis and engine of the ZIS-151, it shared that truck's maintenance problems and poor cross-country mobility. Later variants, using ZIL-157 components, had more power and larger, single tires that reduced the vehicle's shortcomings but did not eliminate them. Serviceability and reliability remained low.

== Variants ==
=== Soviet Union ===
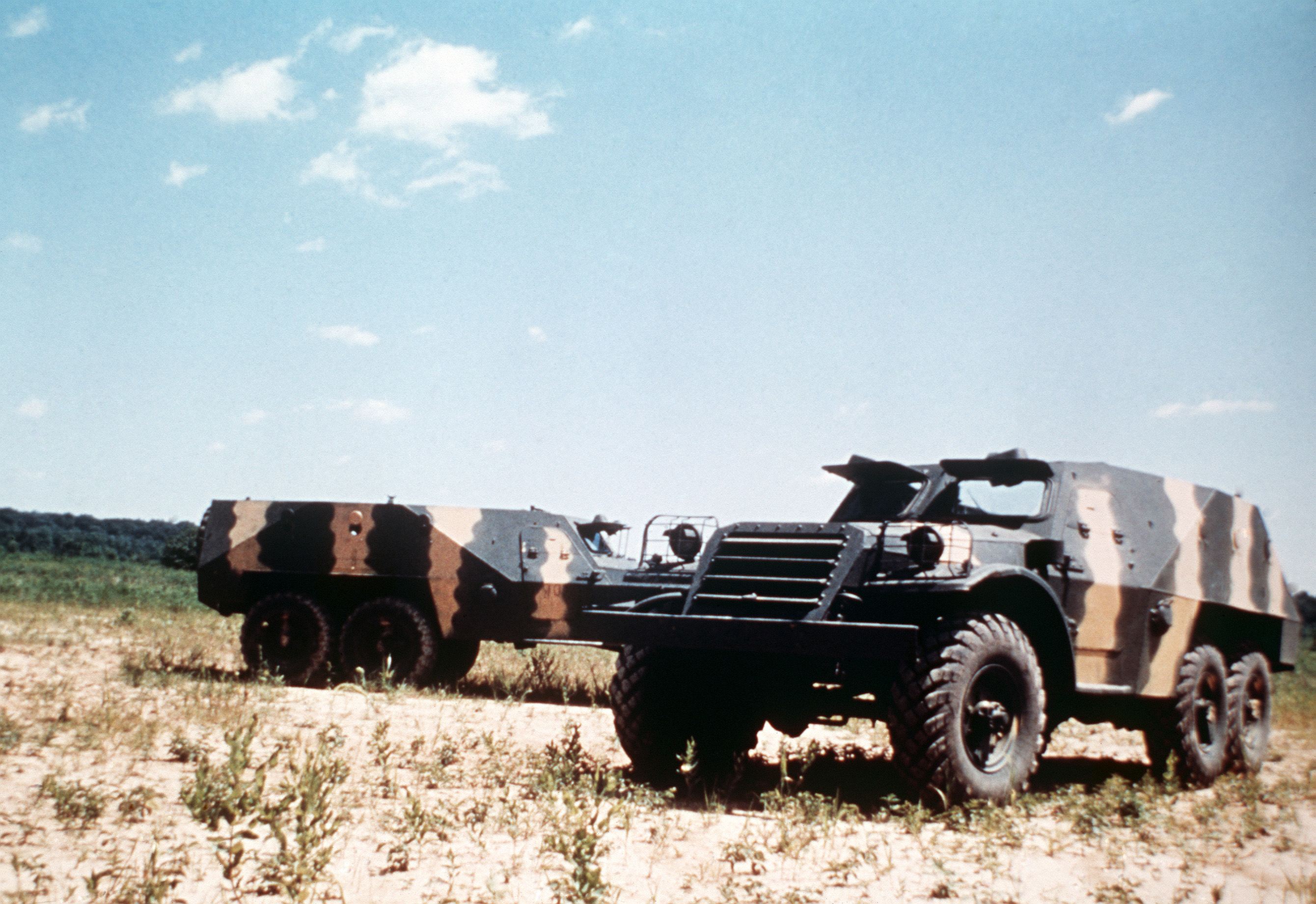
Two Soviet BTR-152V2s.

- BTR-152 (1950) – Basic APC based on ZIS-151 truck, many of which would later be covered and converted for other uses, such as ambulances, radio stations, and engineer vehicles. The basic BTR-152 has no winch, an open top, and no tire pressure control lines.
  - BTR-152A (1951) – BTR-152 converted into a SPAAG armed with a double (ZPTU-2) or quadruple (ZPTU-4) KPVT 14.5 mm antiaircraft heavy machine guns (2400 rounds) in a turret manually operated by a single soldier. The entire vehicle crew consisted of eight soldiers in the variant equipped with ZPTU-2 and five soldiers in the variant equipped with ZPTU-4. The turret is placed inside the troop compartment and can be manually operated by a single soldier. It can make a full turn and its guns can elevate between -5 and +80 degrees.
  - BTR-152 converted into a minelayer equipped with racks for anti-tank mines.
  - BTR-152B (1952) – Artillery command version with a front-mounted winch and external tires pressure regulation system.
  - BTR-152C – Communication variant based on BTR-152.
  - BTR-152V (1955) – Variant based on ZIL-157 truck with external tires pressure regulation system, a front-mounted winch and night vision devices for the driver.
    - BTR-152D (1955) – Armament as BTR-152A, but based on BTR-152V.
    - BTR-152I – BTR-152V version for artillery command vehicle.
    - BTR-152S – Command and communication post vehicle for infantry commanders. It has a significantly higher full cover roof and additional radios and antennas.
    - BTR-152V1 (1957) – Received night vision equipment, winch, open top and improved external tires pressure regulation system.
      - BTR-152K (1959) – Received an armored roof with three big hatches on top of it, two of which opened to the right over the troop compartment, an internal tires pressure regulation system and a filtering/ventilating system. The weight of the vehicle has increased, the crew went down from 2+18 to 2+13.
        - BTR-152K converted into an armored ambulance.
      - BTR-152E – Armament as BTR-152A, but based on BTR-152V1.
      - BTR-152U – Command vehicle based on BTR-152V1 equipped with external tires pressure regulation system. This command vehicle has a significantly higher full cover roof and additional radios and antennas. It has equipment for staff operations. This vehicle normally tows a trailer carrying additional equipment.
        - BTR-152U equipped with internal tire pressure regulation system.
          - BTR-152U with fully armored roof and internal tire pressure regulation system.
    - BTR-152V2 – BTR-152V version without winch. It has the internal tire pressure regulation system.
      - BTR-152D based on BTR-152V2.
      - BTR-152B1 (1958) – Artillery command version with a front-mounted winch, internal tire pressure regulation system and ТВН-2 night vision device for the driver.
    - BTR-152V3 – BTR-152V with winch on the front, open top, infrared driving lights, and internal tire pressure regulation system.
    - BTR-E152V (1957) – Experimental version; the second pair of wheels was moved toward the center of the vehicle in order to improve off-road performance.

=== People's Republic of China ===
- Type 56 – Chinese version of BTR-152.

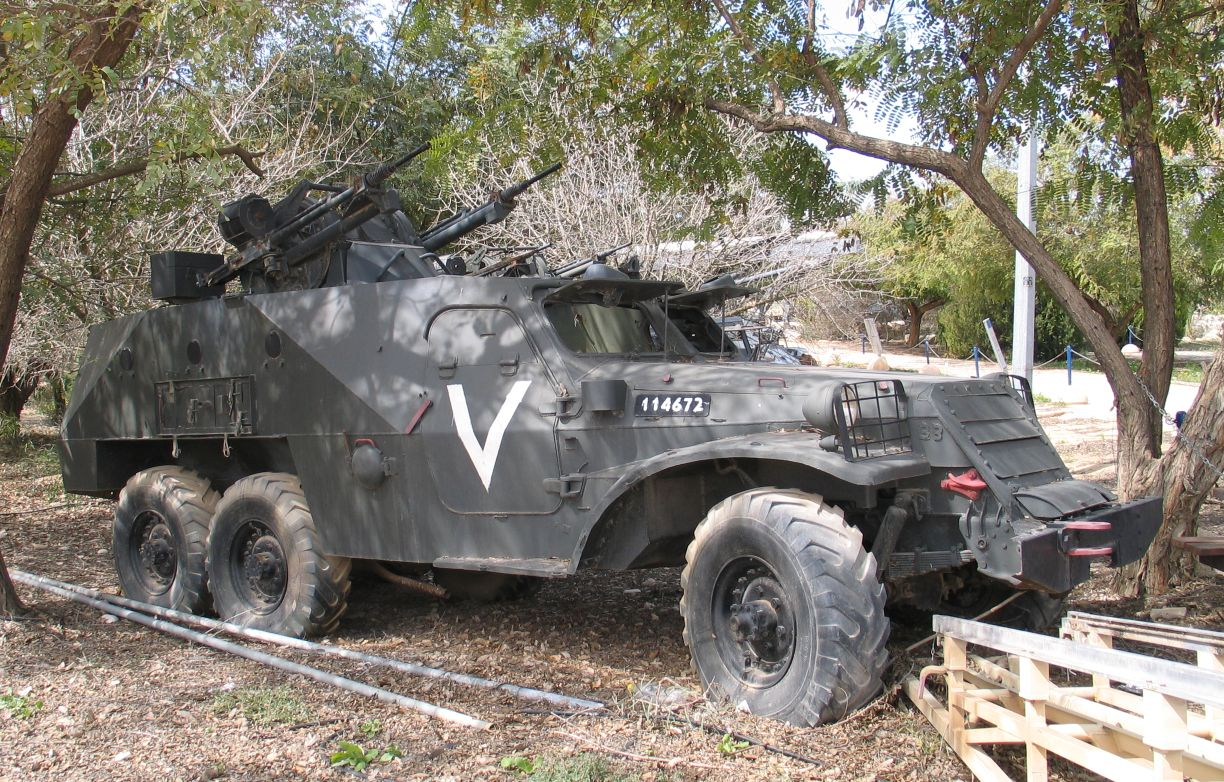
BTR-152 TCM-20 at Muzeyon Heyl ha-Avir, Hatzerim, Israel, 2006.

=== Egypt ===
- BTR-152 converted by Egyptians into a SPAAG armed with Czechoslovak KLAD (Egyptian designation is M58) quadruple DShK 1938/46 12.7 mm anti-aircraft heavy machine guns mounted in the troop compartment. It was withdrawn from service in middle of the 1980s.

=== East Germany ===
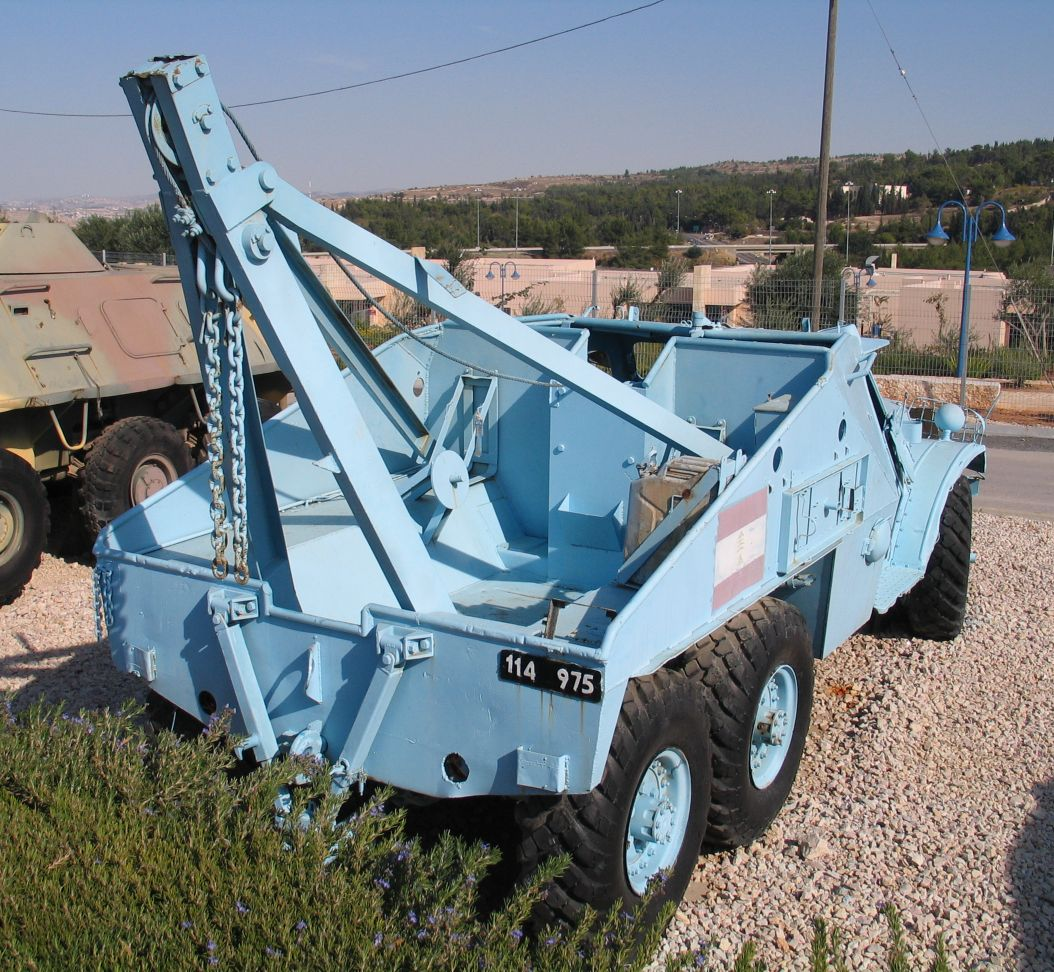
BTR-152 converted into an ARV by the South Lebanese Army Militia next to a BTR-60 APC in Yad la-Shiryon Museum, Latrun, 2005.

- SPW-152 – East German version of BTR-152.
  - SPW-152 converted into an armored ambulance.
  - SPW-152U – East German command version of BTR-152.

=== Israel ===
- BTR-152 captured from Syrians or Egyptians and modified to fulfil the Israeli Army needs.
- BTR-152 TCM-20 – Israeli air defense vehicle based on ex-Syrian or ex-Egyptian BTR-152. It is armed with twin 20 mm cannon in a TCM-20 powered mount.

=== Lebanon ===
- BTR-152 modified by Lebanese militias. It was fitted with a 23mm ZU-23-2 anti-aircraft gun placed inside the troop compartment. It was used in fire support and anti-aircraft roles.
- BTR-152 modified by the South Lebanese Army. It was fitted with a crane inside a cut down troop compartment. One surviving example is at Yad la-Shiryon Museum in Latrun.

=== Poland ===
- BTR-152 converted to serve as a mobile command post. It has additional radios.
- BTR-152 converted into an engineering vehicle.
- BTR-152 converted into an armored artillery tractor.

=== Vietnam ===
- Unknown name for upgraded version carried out by the Vietnam's Institute of Military Vehicle Technology in 2011. The upgraded version uses a diesel engine with a new gearbox, new driving system with hydraulic transmission, additional armored hood, improved suspension and electricity, lights, optics and other modifications. The upgraded BTR-152 is claimed to have higher speed, lower fuel consumption and is easier to use.
- Armored medevac variant unveiled in October 2018.

== Operators ==
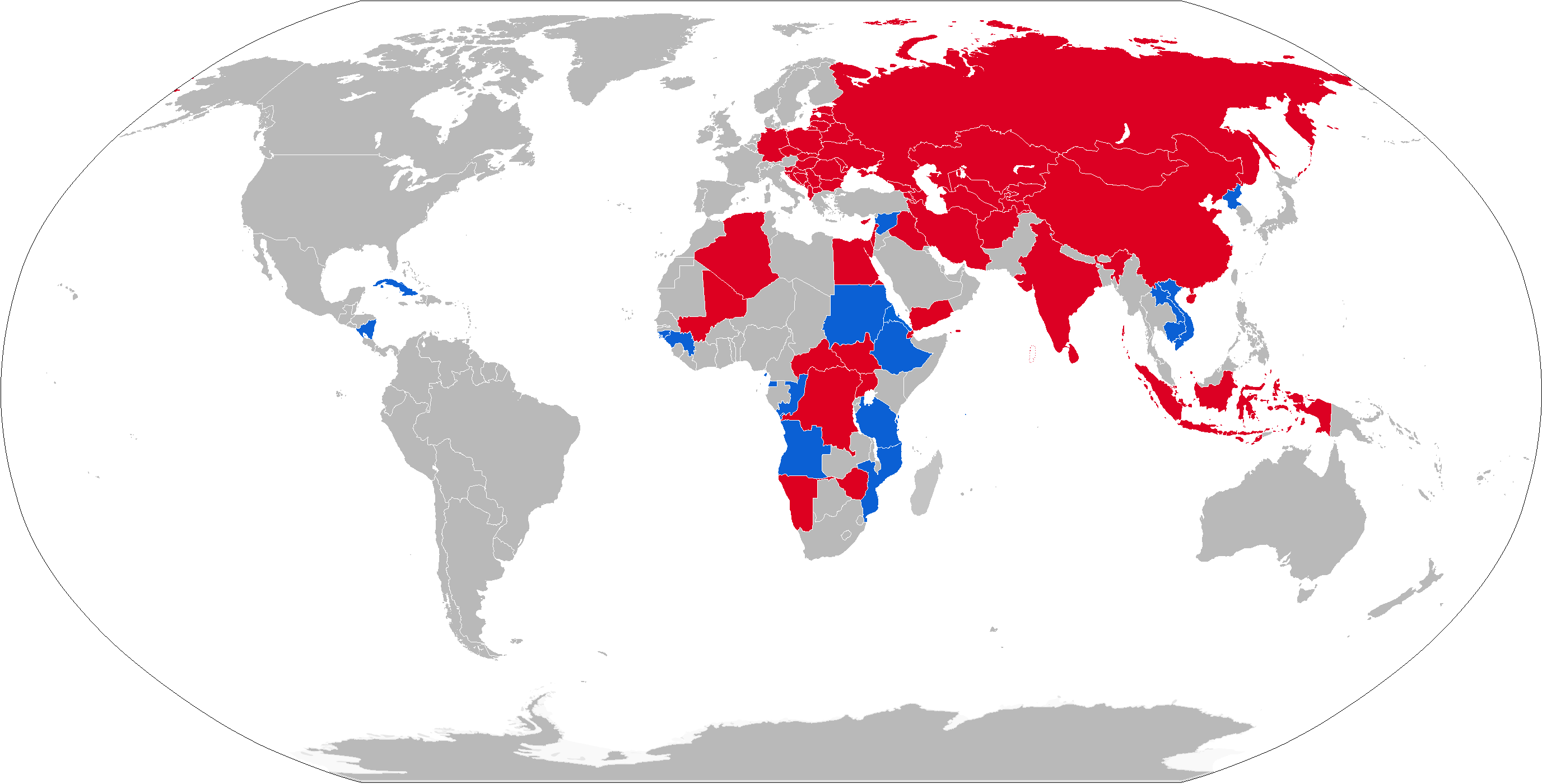
Operators Current Former

=== Current ===
- Angola − 200 BTR-152, BTR-60, BTR-70, and BTR-80 as of 2024
- Cambodia − 200 BTR-152 and BTR-60 as of 2024
- Central African Republic − 4 as of 2024
- Congo − 20 as of 2024
- Cuba − 500 BTR-152, BTR-50, and BTR-60 as of 2024
- Equatorial Guinea − 10 as of 2024
- Eritrea − 25 BTR-152 and BTR-60 as of 2024
- Guinea − 6 as of 2024
- Guinea-Bissau: 20 Type 56 as of 2024
- Laos − 20 as of 2024
- Mozambique − 100 as of 2024
- Nicaragua − 41 in service and 61 in storage as of 2024
- North Korea − Unknown number in service as of 2024
- Sudan − Unknown number in service as of 2024

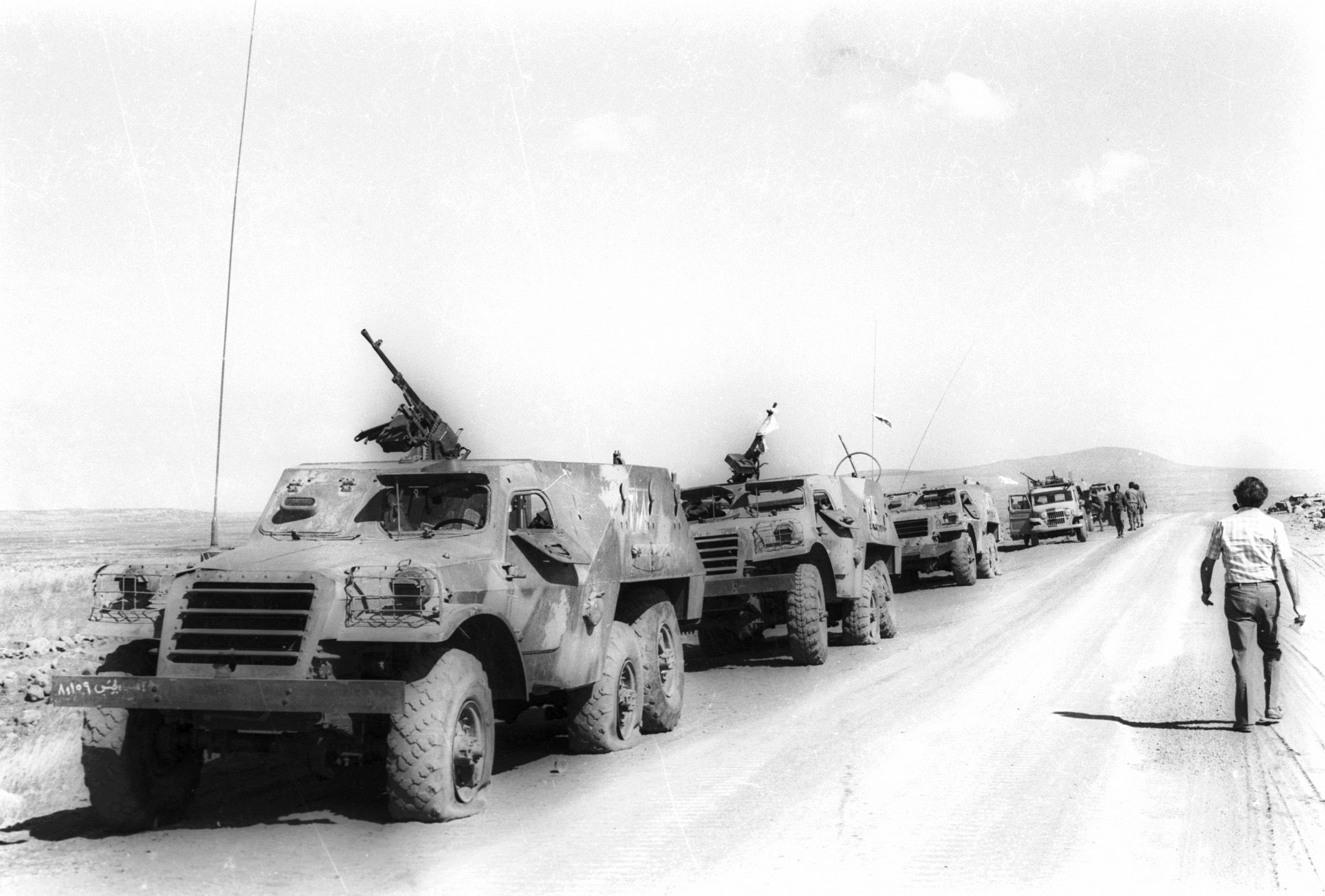
Destroyed Syrian BTR-152s during the Yom Kippur War in 1973.

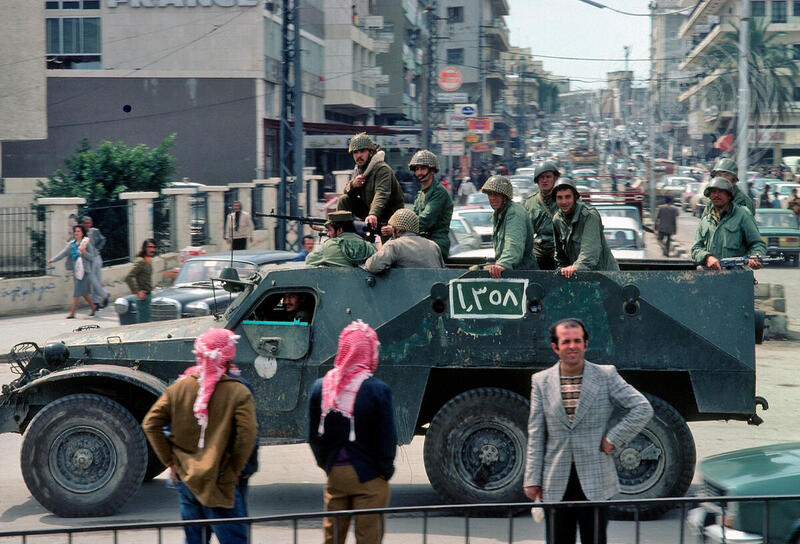
A Syrian BTR-152 armoured personnel carrier patrols the streets of the Lebanese port city of Saida (Sidon), March 1978.

- Syria − Unknown number in service as of 2024
- Tanzania − 10 BTR-40 and BTR-152 as of 2024
- Vietnam − 1,100 BTR-152, BTR-40, and BTR-60 as of 2024

=== Former ===
- Afghanistan
- Albania
- Algeria
- Armenia − 10 in 2011
- Bulgaria
- China − Type 56
- Cyprus − 32
- East Germany
- Egypt
- Estonia − 5
- Ethiopia
- Hungary
- India
- Indonesia
- Iran
- Iraq
- Israel − 34 in service in 2011, captured from Egypt and Syria
- Libya
- Mali
- Mongolia
- Namibia
- North Yemen
- Poland
- Romania
- Seychelles
- Somalia
- South Yemen
- Soviet Union
- Sri Lanka
- Uganda
- Yemen − 60 in 2011
- Yugoslavia
- Zaire − Small number
- Zimbabwe − 16

=== Former non-state operators ===
- Al-Mourabitoun: 5; inherited from the PLO
- FROLINAT
- Guardians of the Cedars (GoC): handed over by Israel or Syria
- Kataeb Regulatory Forces (KRF): handed over by Israel and Syria
- Lebanese Forces: inherited from the KRF and the Tigers Militia
- Palestine Liberation Organization (PLO): handed over by the Soviet Union and Syria
- Progressive Socialist Party/ People's Liberation Army (Druze PLA): handed over by Syria
- South Lebanon Army (SLA): handed over by Israel
- SWAPO/People's Liberation Army of Namibia (PLAN): 6; handed over by the Soviet Union and Angola
- Tigers Militia: handed over by Israel and Syria
- Zimbabwe African National Liberation Army (ZANLA): unknown number of vehicles handed over by Mozambique.
- Zimbabwe People's Revolutionary Army (ZIPRA): 15; handed over by the Soviet Union.
- Wolfgang Engels: 1, stolen to escape East Germany

== See also ==
- Bulat (APC) – (Russia)
- Nimda Shoet – (Israel)

== Bibliography ==
- Foss, Christopher F., ed. (1979). Jane's Armour and Artillery 1979-80 (1st ed.). New York: Franklin Watts Inc. ISBN 978-0-531-03916-8.
- Foss, Christopher F., ed. (1990). Jane's Armour and Artillery 1990-91 (11th ed.). Jane's Information Group. ISBN 978-0-7106-0909-0.
- Foss, Christopher F., ed. (1994). Jane's Armour and Artillery, 1994-95 (15th ed.). Janes Information Group. ISBN 978-0-7106-1154-3.
- Foss, Christopher F., ed. (2011). Jane's Armour and Artillery 2011-2012 (32th ed.). Janes Information Group. ISBN 978-0-7106-2960-9.
- International Institute for Strategic Studies (2024). The Military Balance 2024. Taylor & Francis. ISBN 978-1-040-05115-3.
