= List of marines and similar forces =

Many countries around the world maintain marines and naval infantry military units. Even if only a few nations have the capabilities to launch major amphibious assault operations, most marines and naval infantry forces are able to carry out limited amphibious landings, riverine and coastal warfare tasks. The list includes also army units specifically trained to operate as marines or naval infantry forces, and navy units with specialized naval security and boarding tasks.

== Algeria ==
The Marine Fusiliers Regiments are the marine infantry regiments of the Algerian Navy and they are specialised in amphibious warfare.

The RFM have about 7000 soldiers in their ranks.

Within the Algerian navy there are 8 regiments of marine fusiliers:

- 1st Marine Fusiliers Regiment "Martyr Housh Mohamed" of Jijel ("الفوج الأول للرماة البحريين "الشهيد حوش محمد - Al-Fawj Al'awal Lilrumat al-Bahriiyn "Al-Shahid Housh Mohamed")
- 3rd Marine Fusiliers Regiment of Azzefoun (الفوج الأول للرماة البحريين - Al-Fawj Al'awal Lilrumat al-Bahriiyn)
- 4th Marine Fusiliers Regiment of El Milia (الفوج الرابع للرماة البحريين - Al-Fawj al'rrabie Lilrumat al-Bahriiyn)
- 5th Marine Fusiliers Regiment of Ténès (الفوج الأول للرماة البحريين - Al-Fawj Al'awal Lilrumat al-Bahriiyn)
- 7th Marine Fusiliers Regiment of Boumerdes (الفوج الأول للرماة البحريين - Al-Fawj Al'awal Lilrumat al-Bahriiyn)
- ?? Marine Fusiliers Regiment of Dellys (الفوج الأول للرماة البحريين - Al-Fawj Al'awal Lilrumat al-Bahriiyn)
- ?? Marine Fusiliers Regiment of Mers-El-Kebir (الف وج الأول للرماة البحريين - Al-Fawj Al'awal Lilrumat al-Bahriiyn)
- 12th Coastal Artillery Regiment of Collo "Martyr Ferendi Mohamed" ( الفوج 12 للمدفعية الساحلية الشهيد فرندي محمد - Al-Fawj 12 Lilmadfaeiat al-Sahiliat "al-Shahid Ferendi Mohamed)

Future marine fusiliers and marine commandos are trained in:

- School of Application of the Marine Troops (مدرسة الرماة البحريين و الغطاسين - Madrasat Alrumat Albahriiyn w Alghatasin)

== Angola ==
- Naval Fusiliers Brigade (Brigada de Fuzileiros Navais)
  - 1st Naval Fusiliers Battalion (1.o Batalhão de Fuzileiros Navais)
  - Naval Fusiliers School ( Escola dos Fuzileiros Navais)

== Argentina ==
- Army
  - 121st Amphibious Engineers Battalion (Batallón de Ingenieros Anfibios 121)
  - 601st Army Divers Engineers Company (Compañía de Ingenieros de Buzos de Ejército 601)
- Navy
  - Marine Infantry Command (Comando de la Infanteria de Marina)
    - Base Services Group (Agrupación de Servicios de Cuartel)
    - Fleet Marine Infantry Force "Lieutenant Don Cándido de Lasala" (Fuerza de Infantería de Marina de la Flota de Mar "Teniente de Navío Don Cándido de Lasala")
      - Headquarters and Logistic Support Battalion (Batallón Comando y Apoyo Logístico)
      - 2nd Marine Infantry Battalion "Commander Pedro Edgardo Giachino" (Batallón de Infantería de Marina No. 2 "Capitán de Fragata Pedro Edgardo Giachino")
      - 1st Field Artillery Battalion (School) (Batallón de Artillería de Campaña No. 1 (Escuela))
      - Anti-Aircraft Battalion (Batallón Antiaéreo)
      - Amphibious Engineers Company (Compañía de Ingenieros Anfibios)
      - 1st Signal Battalion (School) (Batallón de Comunicaciones No. 1 (Escuela))
      - 1st Amphibious Vehicles Battalion (Batallón de Vehículos Anfibios No. 1)
      - Amphibious Commandos Group (Agrupación de Comandos Anfibios)
    - Riverine Naval Area Command (Comando del Área Naval Fluvial)
      - 3rd Marine Infantry Battalion "Admiral Eleazar Videla" (Batallón de Infantería de Marina No. 3 "Almirante Eleazar Videla")
    - Marine Infantry Southern Force (Fuerza de Infantería de Marina Austral)
      - 4th Marine Infantry Battalion (Batallón de Infantería de Marina No. 4)
      - 5th Marine Infantry Battalion (School) (Batallón de Infantería de Marina No. 5 (Escuela))
      - Río Grande, Tierra del Fuego Naval Detachment (Destacamento Naval Río Grande)
    - Marine Infantry Training and Test Command (Comando de Instrucción y Evaluación de la Infantería de Marina)
      - Marine Infantry Base "Baterías" (Base de Infantería de Marina Baterías)
    - Navy General Staff Security Battalion (Batallón de Seguridad del Estado Mayor General de la Armada)
    - Puerto Belgrano Base Security Battalion (Batallón de Seguridad de la Base de Puerto Belgrano)

== Australia ==
- Army
  - 2nd Battalion, Royal Australian Regiment

== Azerbaijan ==
- Naval Infantry Battalion (Dəniz Piyada Taburu)
- Marine Special Purpose Sabotage and Reconnaissance Center - Military Unit 641 (Dəniz Təxribat və Kəşfiyyat Mərkəz Xüsusi Təyinat - 641 Saylı Hərbi Hissə)

== Bahamas ==
- Commando Squadron

== Bangladesh ==
- Special Warfare Diving and Salvage (স্পেশাল ওয়ারফেয়ার ডাইভিং অ্যান্ড স্যালভেজ - Spēśāla Ōẏāraphēẏāra Aā'ibhiṁ a Yānḍa Syālabhēja)

== Belgium ==
- Special Operations Regiment
  - Amphibious Company, 2nd Commando Battalion (Compagnie Amphibie, 2e Bataillon de Commandos - Amfibisch Companie, 2 Bataljon Commandos)
  - Amphibious Company, 3rd Parachute Battalion (Compagnie Amphibie, 3e Bataillon de Parachutistes - Amfibisch Companie, 3 Bataljon Parachutisten)
- Naval Fusiliers

== Belize ==
- Coast Guard Special Operations Group

== Benin ==
- one Naval Fusiliers unit (Fusiliers Marins)

== Bolivia ==
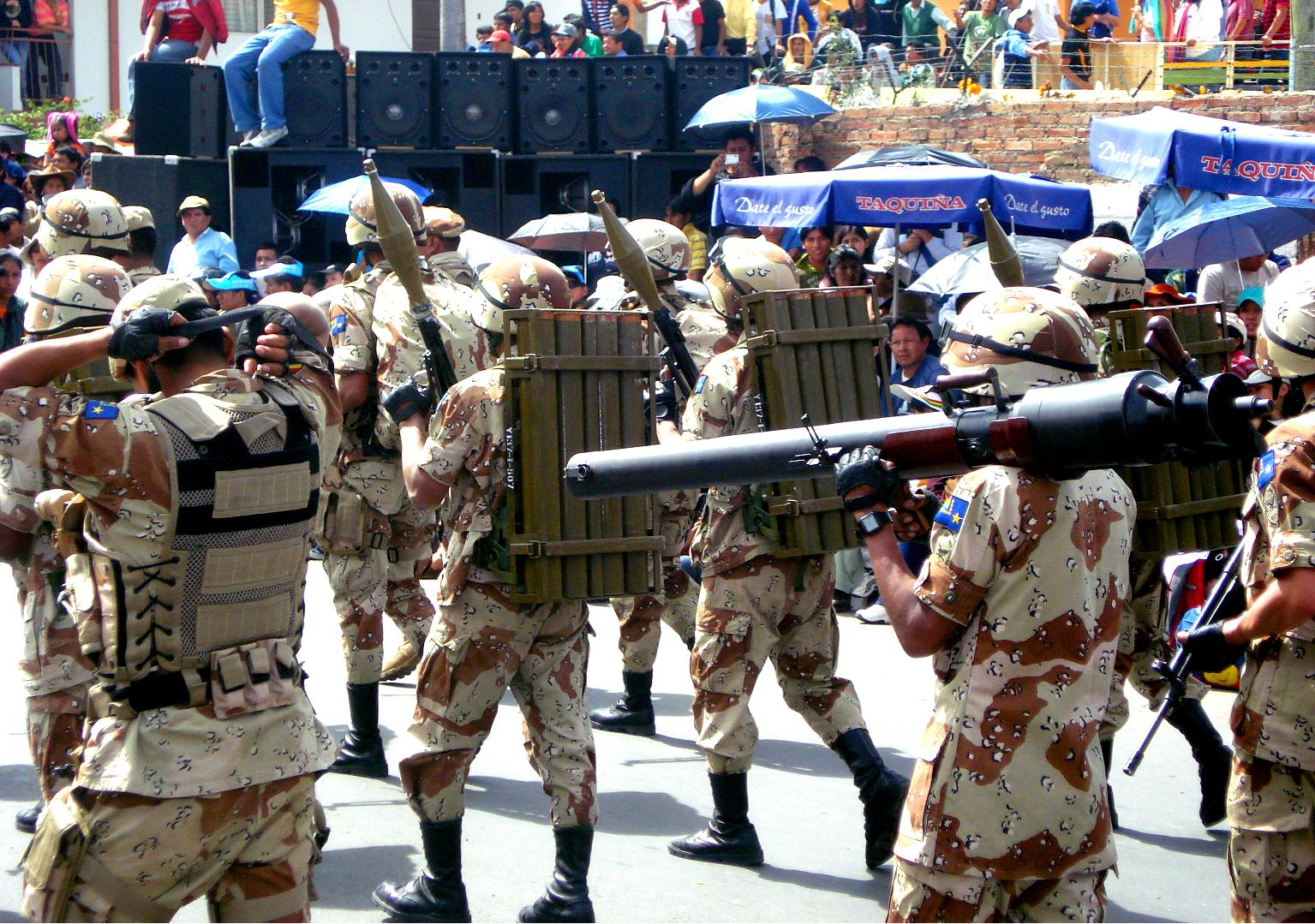
Bolivian Infantería de Marina parade in Cochabamba, 2008

- Marine Infantry Corps (Cuerpo de Infantería de Marina)
  - 1st Marine Infantry Battalion "Bagué" (Batallón de Infantería de Marina I "Bagué")
  - 2nd Marine Infantry Battalion "Tocopilla" (Batallón de Infantería de Marina II "Tocopilla")
  - 3rd Marine Infantry Battalion "Mejillones" (Batallón de Infantería de Marina III "Mejillones")
  - 4th Marine Infantry Battalion "Alianza" (Batallón de Infantería de Marina IV "Alianza")
  - 5th Marine Infantry Battalion "Calama" (Batallón de Infantería de Marina V "Calama")
  - 6th Marine Mechanized Infantry Battalion "Independence" (Batallón de Infantería de Marina Mecanizada VI "Independencia")
  - 7th Marine Infantry Battalion "Future Column" (Batallón de Infantería de Marina VII "Columna Porvenir")
- Naval Military Police (Policía Militar Naval)
  - 1st Naval Military Police Battalion "La Paz" (Batallón de Policía Militar Naval N° 1 "La Paz")
  - 2nd Naval Military Police Battalion "Carcaje" (Batallón de Policía Militar Naval N° 2 "Carcaje")
  - 3rd Naval Military Police Battalion "Santa Cruz" (Batallón de Policía Militar Naval N° 3 "Santa Cruz")
  - 4th Naval Military Police Battalion "Titicaca" (Batallón de Policía Militar Naval N° 4 "Titicaca")
  - 5th Naval Military Police Battalion "Puerto Quijarro" (Batallón de Policía Militar Naval N° 5 "Puerto Quijarro")
  - Riverine Military Police Task Unit (Unidad de Tarea "Policía Militar Fluvial")
- Amphibious Commandos Battalion (Batallón de Comandos Anfibios)
- Amphibious Commandos Training Center ( Centro de Instrucción de Comandos Anfibios)

== Brazil ==
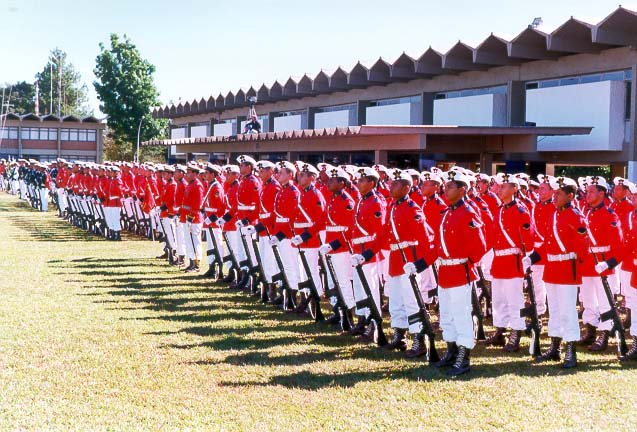
Brazilian Fuzileiros Navais in parade uniform

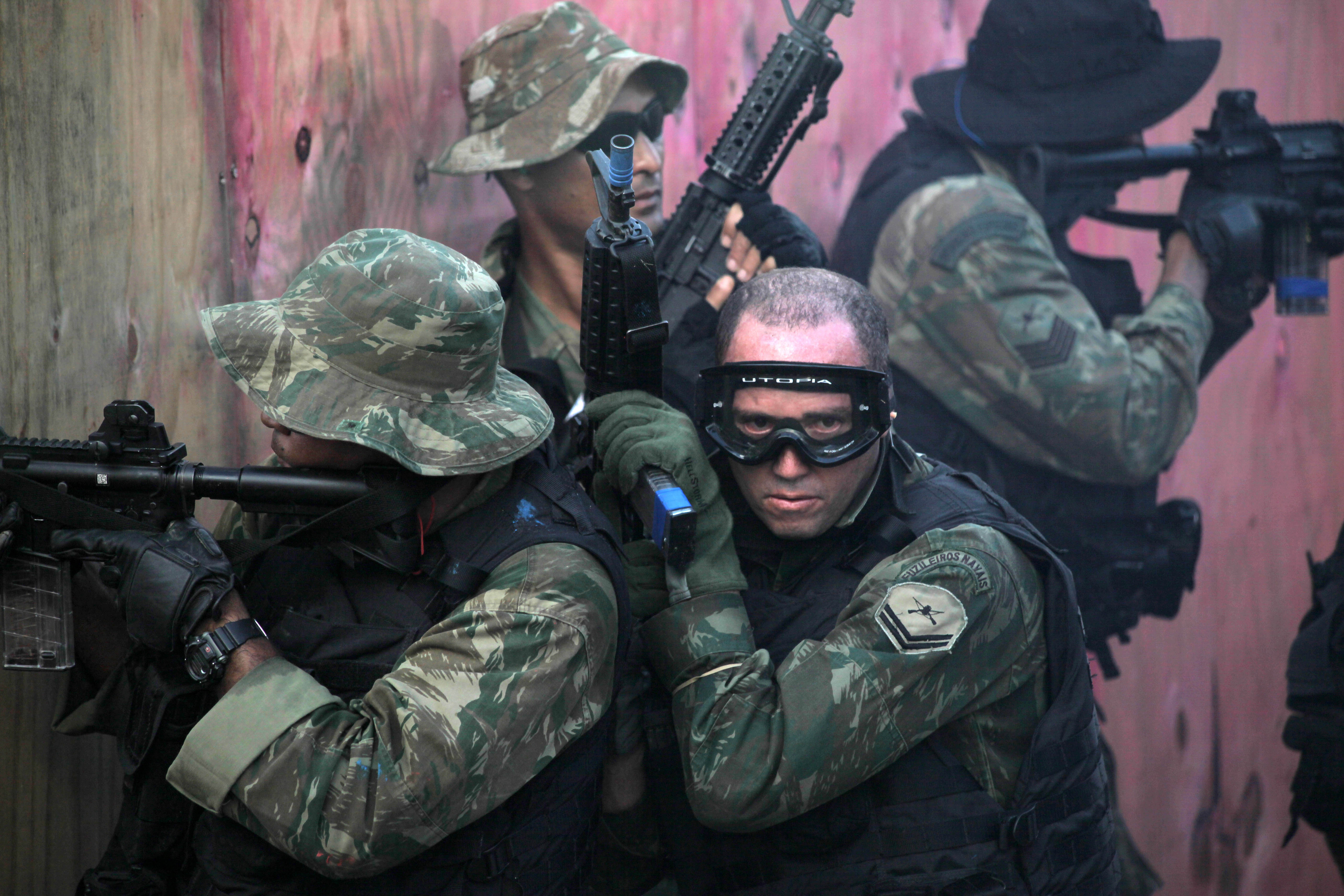
Brazilian Marines of the "Tonelero" Special Operations Battalion

- Army
  - 17th Frontier Battalion "Antônio Maria Coelho" (17º Batalhão de Fronteira "Antônio Maria Coelho") including:
    - Swampland Operations Training Center (Centro de Instrução de Operações no Pantanal)
- Naval Fusiliers Corps (Corpo de Fuzileiros Navais)
  - Fleet Marine Force (Força de Fuzileiros da Esquadra)
    - Amphibious Division Command (Comando da Divisão Anfíbia) - in Rio de Janeiro
      - Ilha do Governador Marines Base (Base de Fuzileiros Navais da Ilha do Governador)
      - Command and Control Battalion (Batalhão de Comando e Controle)
      - 1st Marines Infantry Battalion "Riachuelo" (1º Batalhão de Infantaria de Fuzileiros Navais "Riachuelo")
      - 2nd Marines Infantry Battalion "Humaitá" (2º Batalhão de Infantaria de Fuzileiros Navais "Humaitá")
      - 3rd Marines Infantry Battalion "Paissandu" (3º Batalhão de Infantaria de Fuzileiros Navais "Paissandu")
      - Marines Artillery Battalion (Batalhão de Artilharia de Fuzileiros Navais)
      - Marines Armoured Battalion (Batalhão de Blindados de Fuzileiros Navais)
    - Litoral Division Command (Comando da Divisão Litorânea) - in São Gonçalo
      - Ilha das Flores Marines Base (Base de Fuzileiros Navais da Ilha das Flores)
      - Marines Engineer Battalion (Batalhão de Engenharia de Fuzileiros Navais)
      - Marines Logistic Battalion (Batalhão Logístico de Fuzileiros Navais)
      - Amphibious Vehicles Battalion (Batalhão de Viaturas Anfíbias)
      - 2nd CBRN Defense and Protection Battalion (2º Batalhão de Proteção e Defesa Nuclear, Biológica, Química e Radiológica)
      - Navy Expeditionary Medical Unit (Unidade Médica Expedicionária da Marinha)
    - Riverine Division Command (Comando da Divisão Ribeirinha)
    - Air Combat Battalion (Batalhão de Combate Aéreo)
    - Marine Special Operations Battalion "Tonelero" (Batalhão de Operações Especiais de Fuzileiros Navais "Tonelero")
    - Rio Meriti Marines Base (Base de Fuzileiros Navais do Rio Meriti)
  - General Command of the Marine Corps (Comando-Geral do Corpo de Fuzileiros Navais)
    - Navy Sports Commission (Comissão de Desportos da Marinha)
    - Admiral Adalberto Nunes Physical Education Center (Centro de Educação Física Almirante Adalberto Nunes)
    - Navy's CBRN Defense and Protection Command (Comando de Proteção e Defesa Nuclear, Biológica, Química e Radiológica da Marinha)
      - Naval Battalion (Batalhão Naval)
      - Marine Corps Police Battalion (Batalhão de Polícia de Fuzileiros Navais)
    - Command for Training and Doctrinal Development of the Marine Corps (Comando do Treinamento e do Desenvolvimento Doutrinário do Corpo de Fuzileiros Navais)
      - Admiral Sylvio de Camargo Training Center (Centro de Instrução Almirante Sylvio de Camargo)
      - Marambaia Island Training Center (Centro de Adestramento da Ilha da Marambaia)
      - Center for Peace and Humanitarian Operations of a Naval Nature (Centro de Operações de Paz e Humanitárias de Caráter Naval)
    - Marine Corps Personnel Command (Comando do Pessoal de Fuzileiros Navais)
      - Training Center "Admiral Milciades Portela Alves" (CIAMPA, Centro de Instrução "Almirante Milciades Portela Alves")
    - Marine Corps Materiel Command (Comando do Material de Fuzileiros Navais)
      - Technological Center of the Marine Corps (Centro Tecnológico do Corpo de Fuzileiros Navais)
      - Navy Supply Center in Parada de Lucas (Centro de Intendência da Marinha em Parada de Lucas)
- 1st Litoral Operations Battalion, Rio de Janeiro (1° Batalhão de Operações Litorâneas)
- 2nd Litoral Operations Battalion, Salvador (2° Batalhão de Operações Litorâneas)
- 3rd Litoral Operations Battalion, Natal (3° Batalhão de Operações Litorâneas)
- 4th Litoral Operations Battalion, Santos (4° Batalhão de Operações Litorâneas)
- 5th Litoral Operations Battalion, Rio Grande (5° Batalhão de Operações Litorâneas)
- 1st CBRN Defense and Protection Battalion, Iperó (1º Batalhão de Proteção e Defesa Nuclear, Biológica, Química e Radiológica)
- 3rd CBRN Defense and Protection Battalion, Brasília (3º Batalhão de Proteção e Defesa Nuclear, Biológica, Química e Radiológica)
- 1st Marines Riverine Operations Battalion, Manaus (1º Batalhão de Operações Ribeirinhas de Fuzileiros Navais)
- 2nd Marines Riverine Operations Battalion, Belém (2º Batalhão de Operações Ribeirinhas de Fuzileiros Navais)
- 3rd Marines Riverine Operations Battalion, Ladário (3º Batalhão de Operações Ribeirinhas de Fuzileiros Navais)
- Training and Instruction Center in Brasília (Centro de Instrução e Adestramento de Brasília)

== Bulgaria ==
- 65th Naval Special Reconnaissance Unit "Black Sea Sharks" (65-и морски специален разузнавателен отряд "Черноморски акули" - 65-i Morski Spetsialen Razuznavatelen Otryad "Chernomorski Akuli")

== Cambodia ==
- 31st Naval Infantry Brigade

== Cameroon ==
Army

- Special Amphibious Battalion (Bataillon Spécial Amphibie)

Navy

- 11th Marine Fusiliers Battalion (11.e Bataillon Fusiliers Marins)
- 21st Marine Fusiliers Battalion (21.e Bataillon Fusiliers Marins)
- 22nd Marine Fusiliers Battalion (22.e Bataillon Fusiliers Marins)

== Canada ==
- Army
  - 3rd Battalion, The Royal Canadian Regiment
  - 3rd Battalion, Royal 22nd Regiment (3e Battalion, Royal 22e Régiment)
  - 3rd Battalion, PPCLI
- Navy
  - Naval Tactical Operation Group
  - Naval Security Team
- Canadian Special Operations Forces Command
  - JTF2
- Canadian Armed Forces Divers

== Cape Verde ==
- Naval Fusiliers Company (Companhia dos Fuzileiros Navais)

== Central African Republic ==
- Amphibious Battalion (Bataillon Amphibie)

== Chile ==
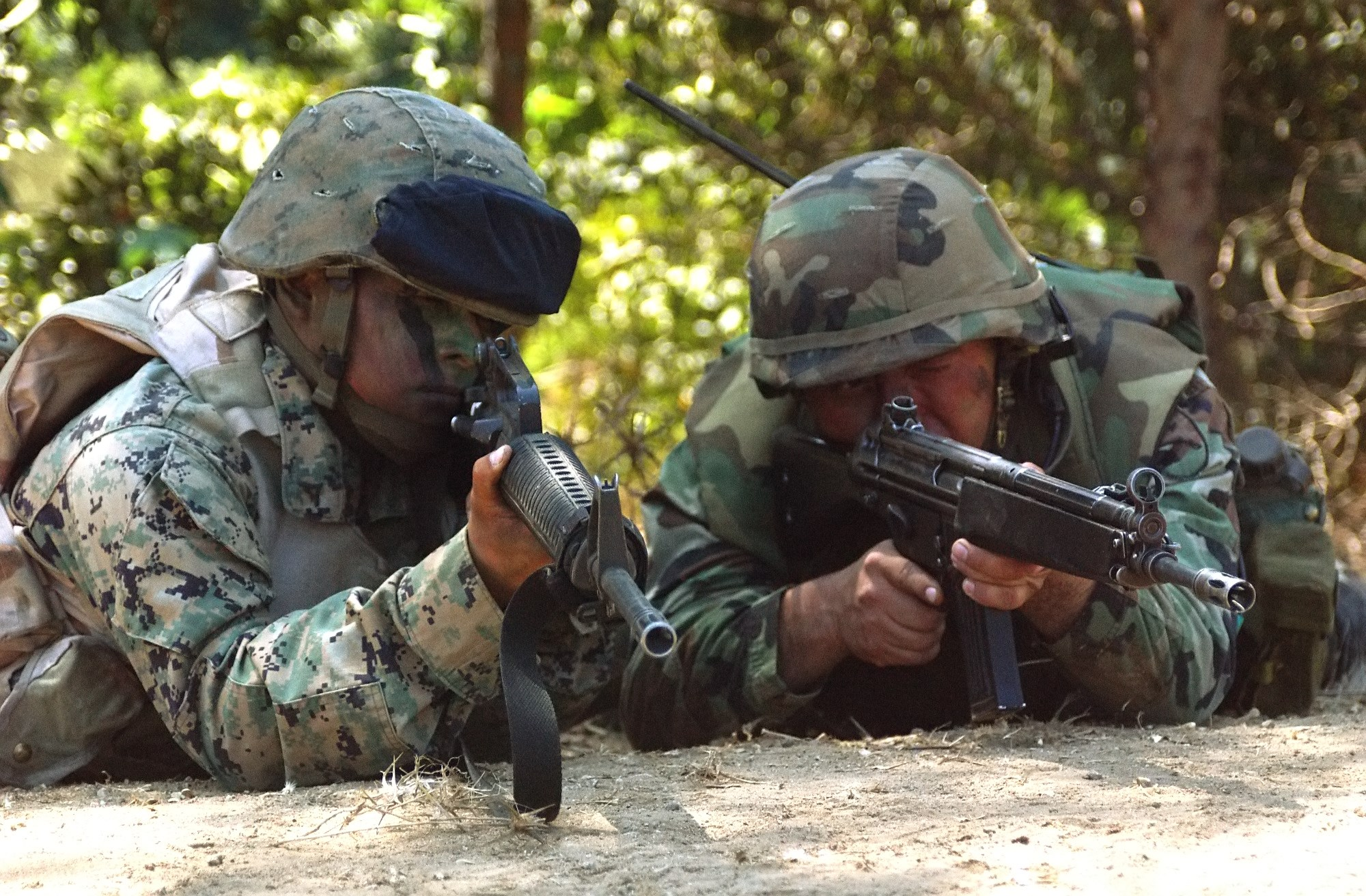
Chilean naval infantrymen

- Army
  - Special Forces Group (Agrupación de Fuerzas Especiales)
    - Amphibious Company (Compañía Anfibia)
- Marine Infantry Corps (Cuerpo de Infantería de Marina)
  - Expeditionary Amphibious Brigade (Brigada Anfibia Expedicionaria)
    - 21st Marine Infantry Battalion "Miller" (Batallón Infantería de Marina N°21 "Miller")
    - 31st Marine Infantry Battalion "Alea" (Batallón Infantería de Marina N°31 "Aldea")
    - 41st Marine Infantry Combat Support Battalion "Hurtado" (Batallón de Apoyo de Combate de Infantería de Marina N°41 "Hurtado")
    - 51st Marine Infantry Logistic Battalion "Olave" (Batallón Logístico de Infantería de Marina "N°51 Olave")
  - Protection Forces (Fuerzas de Protección)
    - 1st Marine Infantry Detachment "Lynch" (Destacamento de Infantería de Marina N°1 "Lynch")
    - 4th Marine Infantry Detachment "Cochrane" (Destacamento de Infantería de Marina N.4 "Cochrane")
  - Marine Infantry School "Commander Jaime Charles" (Escuela de Infantería de Marina "Comandante Jaime Charles)
  - Marine Infantry Basic Training Center (Centro de Entrenamiento Básico de la Infantería de Marina)

== China (People's Republic of China) ==
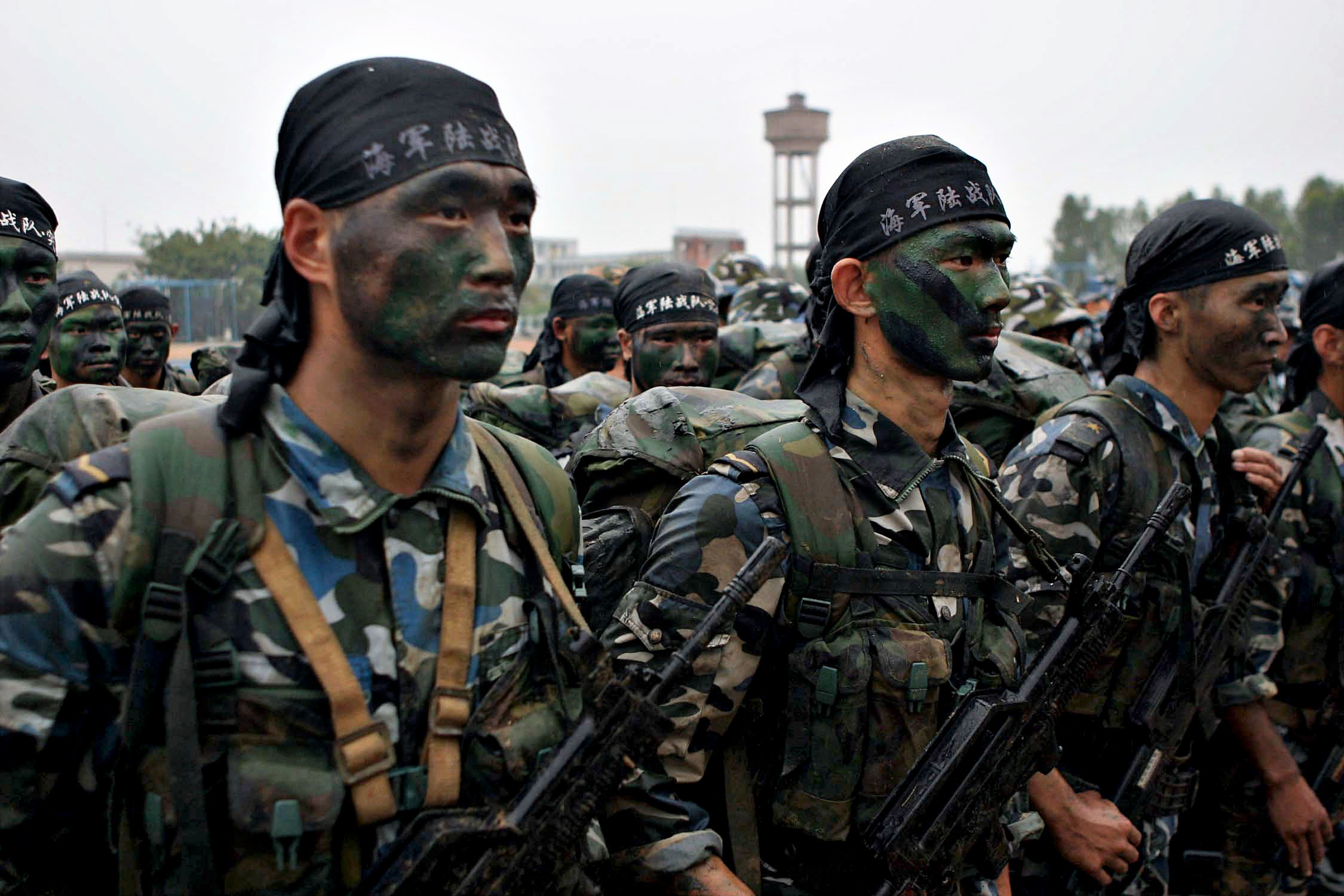
Marines of People's Liberation Army Navy Marine Corps

- People's Liberation Army Ground Force (中国人民解放军陆军 - Zhōngguó Rénmín Jiěfàngjūn Lùjūn)
  - 1st Amphibious Combined Arms Brigade (两栖合成第1旅 - Liǎngqī Héchéng dì 1 Lǚ)
  - 5th Amphibious Combined Arms Brigade (两栖合成第5旅 - Liǎngqī Héchéng dì 5 Lǚ)
  - 14th Amphibious Combined Arms Brigade (两栖合成第14旅 - Liǎngqī Héchéng dì 14 Lǚ)
  - 91st Amphibious Combined Arms Brigade (两栖合成第91旅 - Liǎngqī Héchéng dì 91 Lǚ)
  - 124th Amphibious Combined Arms Brigade (两栖合成第124旅 - Liǎngqī Héchéng dì 124 Lǚ)
  - 125th Amphibious Combined Arms Brigade (两栖合成第125旅 - Liǎngqī Héchéng dì 125 Lǚ)
- People's Liberation Army Navy Marine Corps (中国人民解放军海军陆战队 - Zhōngguó Rénmín Jiěfàngjūn Hǎijūnlùzhànduì)
  - 1st Landing Brigade "Oriental Seals" (立陆战第1旅 (东方海豹) - Hǎijūn lù zhàn dì 1 lǚ "Dōngfāng Hǎibào")
  - 2nd Landing Brigade (立陆战第2旅 - Lì lù zhàn dì 2 lǚ)
  - 3rd Landing Brigade (立陆战第3旅 - Lì lù zhàn dì 3 lǚ)
  - 4th Landing Brigade (立陆战第4旅 - Lì lù zhàn dì 4 lǚ)
  - 5th Landing Brigade (立陆战第5旅 - Lì lù zhàn dì 5 lǚ)
  - 6th Landing Brigade (立陆战第6旅 - Lì lù zhàn dì 6 lǚ)
  - Marine Special Operations Brigade "Scaly Dragon" (海军陆战队特种作战旅( 蛟龍) - Hǎijūn Lù Zhànduì Tèzhǒng Zuòzhàn Lǚ "Jiāolóng'tújí")
  - Marine Landing Training School (海军陆战学校 - Hǎijūn lù zhàn xuéxiào)

== Taiwan (Republic of China) ==
- Army
  - 101st Amphibious Reconnaissance Battalion (101兩棲偵察營 - 101 Liǎngqī Zhēnchá Yíng), including:
    - 148th Reserve Training Team (儲訓隊148 - Chǔ Xùn Duì 148)
- Marine Corps (海軍陸戰隊 - Hǎijūn Lù Zhàn Duì)
  - Amphibious Armour Group (登陸戰車大隊 - Dēnglù Zhàn Chē Dàduì)
  - Amphibious Reconnaissance Group (兩棲偵搜大隊 – Liǎngqī Zhēn Sōu Dàduì)
    - Special Service Company (特勤隊 - Tèqín Duì) aka "The Black (Outfit) Unit" (黑衣部隊 - Hēi yī bùduì)
  - Combat Support Group (戰鬥支援大隊 - Zhàndòu Zhīyuán Dàduì)
  - Wuqiu Islands Garrison Command (烏坵守備大隊 - Wūqiū Shǒubèi Dàduì)
  - Air Defence Guard Group "Iron Guard Force" (防空警衛群 "鐵衛部隊"- Fángkōng Jǐngwèi Qún "Tiě Wèi Bùduì)
  - 66th Marine Brigade "Vanguard Force" (陸戰66旅 "先鋒部隊" - Lù Zhàn 66 Lǚ "Xiānfēng Bùduì")
    - 1st Infantry Battalion (步兵第一營 - Bùbīng dì Yī Yíng)
    - 2nd Infantry Battalion (步兵第二營 - Bùbīng dì Èr Yíng)
    - 3rd Infantry Battalion (步兵第三營 - Bùbīng dì Sān Yíng)
    - Tank Battalion (戰車營 - Zhàn Chē Yíng)
    - Artillery Battalion (砲兵營 - Pàobīng Yíng)
  - 99th Marine Brigade "Iron Army Force" (陸戰99旅"鐵軍部隊" - Lù Zhàn 99 Lǚ "Tiě Jūn Bùduì")
    - 1st Infantry Battalion (步兵第一營 - Bùbīng dì Yī Yíng)
    - 2nd Infantry Battalion (步兵第二營 - Bùbīng dì Èr Yíng)
    - 3rd Infantry Battalion (步兵第三營 - Bùbīng dì Sān Yíng)
    - Tank Battalion (戰車營 - Zhàn Chē Yíng)
    - Artillery Battalion (砲兵營 - Pàobīng Yíng)
  - Marine Corps School (海軍陸戰隊學校 - Hǎijūn Lù Zhàn Duì Xuéxiào)

== Colombia ==
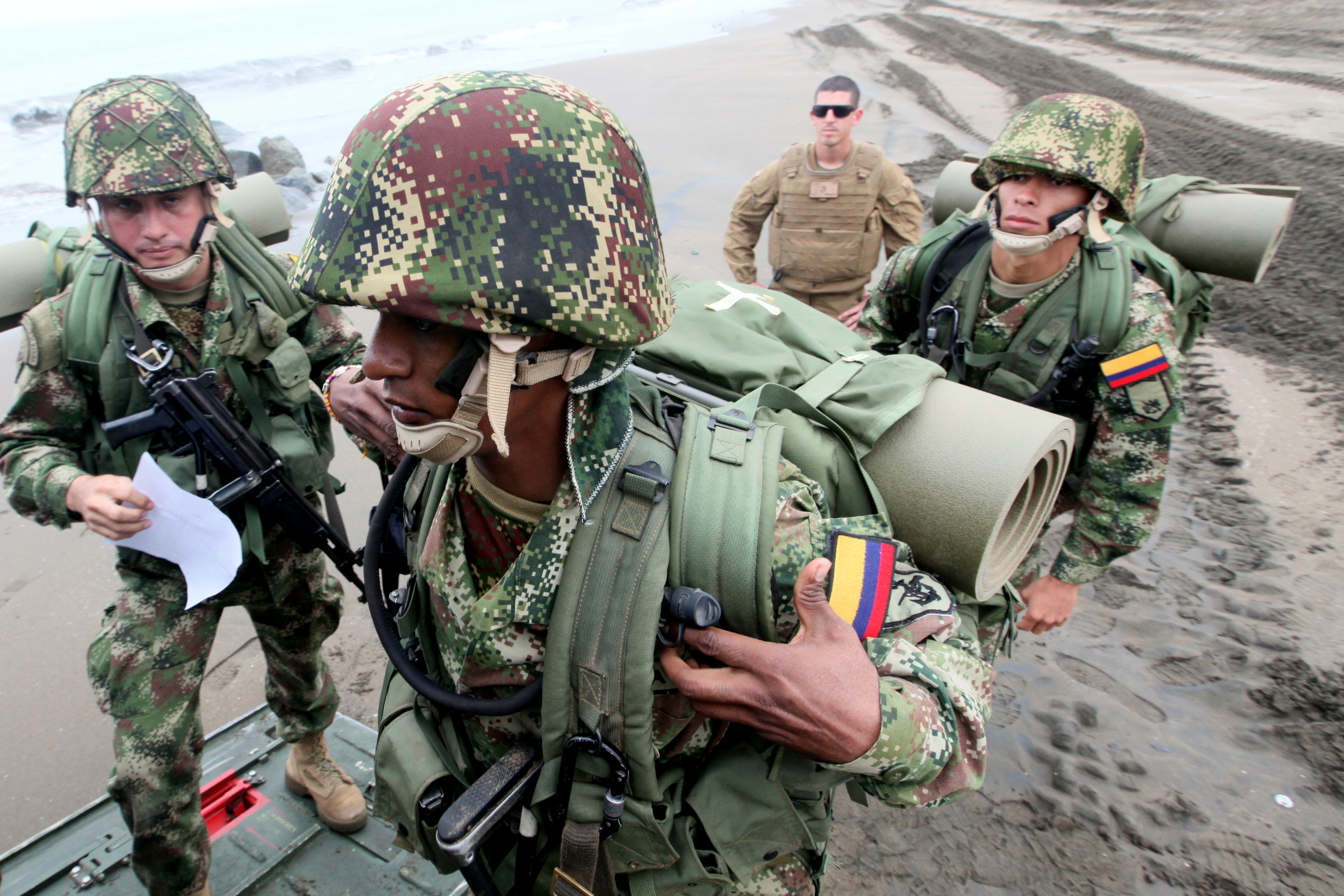
Colombian Marine Infantrymen

- Colombian Marine Infantry (Infantería de Marina Colombiana)
  - 1st Marine Infantry Brigade (Brigada de Infantería de Marina No. 1)
    - 1st Marine Infantry Command and Support Battalion (Batallon de Comando y Apoyo de Infanteria de Marina No. 1)
    - 12th Marine Infantry Battalion (Batallón de Infantería de Marina No. 12)
    - 13th Marine Infantry Battalion "General Custodio García Rovira" (Batallón de Infantería de Marina No. 13 "General Custodio García Rovira")
    - 14th Marine Infantry Battalion "Colonel Alfredo Persand Barnes" (Batallón de Infantería de Marina No. 14 "Coronel Alfredo Persand Barnes")
    - 15th Marine Infantry Battalion (Batallón de Infantería de Marina No. 15)
    - 16th Marine Infantry Riverine Battalion (Batallón Fluvial de Infantería de Marina No. 16)
    - 17th Marine Infantry Riverine Battalion (Batallón Fluvial de Infantería de Marina No. 17)
    - Naval Infantry Explosives and Demining Group (Agrupación de Explosivos y Desminado de la Infantería de Marina)
  - 2nd Marine Infantry Brigade (Brigada de Infantería de Marina No. 2)
    - 2nd Marine Infantry Command and Support Battalion (Batallon de Comando y Apoyo de Infanteria de Marina No. 2)
    - 21st Marine Infantry Battalion (Batallón de Infantería de Marina No. 21)
    - 22nd Marine Infantry Battalion (Batallón de Infantería de Marina No. 22)
    - 23rd Marine Infantry Battalion (Batallón de Infantería de Marina No. 23)
    - 24th Marine Infantry Riverine Battalion (Batallón Fluvial de Infantería de Marina No. 24)
  - 3rd Marine Infantry Brigade (Brigada de Infantería de Marina No. 3)
    - 3rd Marine Infantry Command and Support Battalion (Batallon de Comando y Apoyo de Infanteria de Marina No. 3)
    - 30th Marine Infantry Riverine Battalion (Batallón Fluvial de Infantería de Marina No. 30)
    - 31st Marine Infantry Riverine Battalion (Batallón Fluvial de Infantería de Marina No. 31)
    - 32nd Marine Infantry Riverine Battalion (Batallón Fluvial de Infantería de Marina No. 32)
    - 33rd Marine Infantry Riverine Battalion (Batallón Fluvial de Infantería de Marina No. 33)
  - 4th Marine Infantry Brigade (Brigada de Infantería de Marina No. 4)
    - 4th Marine Infantry Command and Support Battalion (Batallon de Comando y Apoyo de Infanteria de Marina No. 4)
    - 40th Marine Infantry Battalion (Batallón de Infantería de Marina No. 40)
    - 41st Marine Infantry Riverine Battalion (Batallón Fluvial de Infantería de Marina No. 41)
    - 42nd Marine Infantry Riverine Battalion (Batallón Fluvial de Infantería de Marina No. 42)
  - 5th Marine Infantry Brigade (Brigada de Infantería de Marina No. 5)
    - 50th Marine Infantry Riverine Battalion (Batallón Fluvial de Infantería de Marina No. 50)
    - 51st Marine Infantry Riverine Battalion (Batallón Fluvial de Infantería de Marina No. 51)
    - 52nd Marine Infantry Riverine Battalion (Batallón Fluvial de Infantería de Marina No. 52)
  - 70th Naval Military Police Battalion (Batallón Policia Naval Militar No. 70)
  - 72nd Task Force against Drug Trafficking "Poseidon (Fuerza de Tarea contra el Narcotrafico No. 72 "Poseidón")
  - Marine Infantry Instruction School (Escuela de Formación de Infantería de Marina)
    - Marine Infantry Training base (Base de Entrenamiento de Infantería de Marina)
      - 1st Marine Infantry Training Battalion (Batallón de Instrucción de Infantería de Marina No. 1)
      - 2nd Marine Infantry Training Battalion (Batallón de Instrucción de Infantería de Marina No. 2)
      - 3rd Marine Infantry Training Battalion (Batallón de Instrucción de Infantería de Marina No. 3)
    - 6th Marine Infantry Command and Support Battalion (Batallon de Comando y Apoyo de Infanteria de Marina No. 6)
  - Riverine Task Group (Grupo de Tarea Fluvial)
  - Marine Infantry Special Forces Battalion (Batallón Fuerzas Especiales Infantería de Marina)
  - Marine Infantry Mobility Battalion (Batallón de Movilidad de Infantería de Marina)
  - Logistic Support Command (Comando de Apoyo Logístico)
  - 1st Anti-Terrorism Urban Special Forces Group (Agrupacion de Fuerzas Especiales Antiterroristas Urbanas No. 1)
  - 2nd Anti-Terrorism Urban Special Forces Group (Agrupacion de Fuerzas Especiales Antiterroristas Urbanas No. 2)
  - Unified Action Group for Personal Freedom "Buenaventura" (Grupo de Acción Unificada por la Libertad Personal "Buenaventura")
  - Unified Action Group for Personal Freedom "Cartagena" (Grupo de Acción Unificada por la Libertad Personal "Cartagena")
  - Unified Action Group for Personal Freedom "Montes de María" (Grupo de Acción Unificada por la Libertad Personal "Montes de María")

== Comoros ==
- Marine Fusiliers Company (Compagnie de Fusiliers Marins)

== Republic of the Congo (Congo-Brazzaville) ==
- Marine Fusiliers Battalion (Bataillon Fusiliers Marins)

== Democratic Republic of Congo (Congo-Kinshasa) ==
- one Marines battalion

== Croatia ==
- Naval Assault Infantry Company (Satnija Mornaričkog-Desantnog Pješaštva)

== Cuba ==
- Guard Flottilla "Granma Landing" (Flotilla de Guardia "Desembarco del Granma")
  - two Amphibious Assault Battalions

== Denmark ==
- Frogman Corps

== Dominican Republic ==
- Marine Infantry Battalion (Batallón de Infantería de Marina)
- Amphibious Commandos Unit (Unidad de Comandos Anfibios)

== Ecuador ==
- Marine Infantry Corps (Cuerpo de Infanteria de Marina)
  - 11th Marine Infantry Battalion "San Lorenzo" (Batallon de Infanteria Marina N°11 "San Lorenzo")
  - 12th Marine Infantry Battalion "Esmeraldas" (Batallon de Infanteria Marina N°12 "Esmeraldas")
  - 20th Marine Infantry Battalion "Guayaquil" (Batallon de Infanteria Marina N°20 "Guayaquil")
  - 21st Marine Infantry Battalion "Jaramijo" - Special Operations (Batallon de Infanteria Marina N°21 "Jaramijo" - Operaciones Especiales)
  - 22nd Marine Infantry Battalion "Battle of Jambelí" (Batallon de Infanteria Marina N°22 "Jambelí")
  - 23rd Marine Infantry Battalion "San Eduardo" (Batallon de Infanteria Marina N°23 "San Eduardo")
  - Marine Infantry School "Rear Admiral Napoleón Cabezas Montalvo" (Escuela de Infantería de Marina "Contralmirante Napoleón Cabezas Montalvo)

== Egypt ==
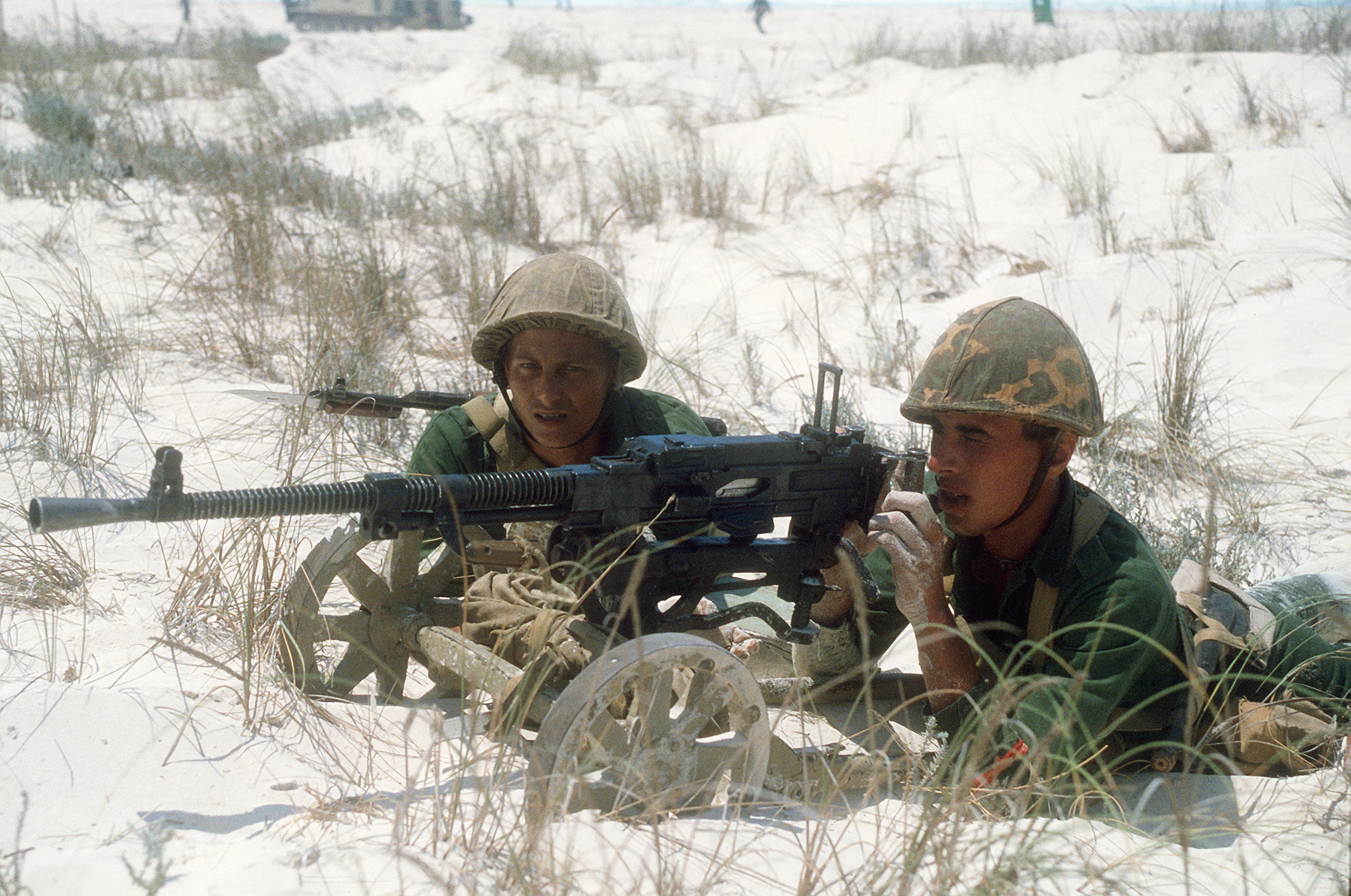
Egyptian marines in training, 1985

- 111th Independent Mechanized Brigade
  - 42nd Mechanized Infantry Battalion
  - 43rd Mechanized Infantry Battalion
  - 44th Mechanized Infantry Battalion
- 153rd Naval Commandos Group
  - 515th Naval Commandos Battalion
  - 616th Naval Commandos Battalion
  - 818th Naval Commandos Battalion

== El Salvador ==
- Marine Infantry Battalion "12 October" (Batallón de Infantería de Marina "12 de Octubre")
- Naval Commandos Battalion (Batallón de Comandos Navales)

== Finland ==
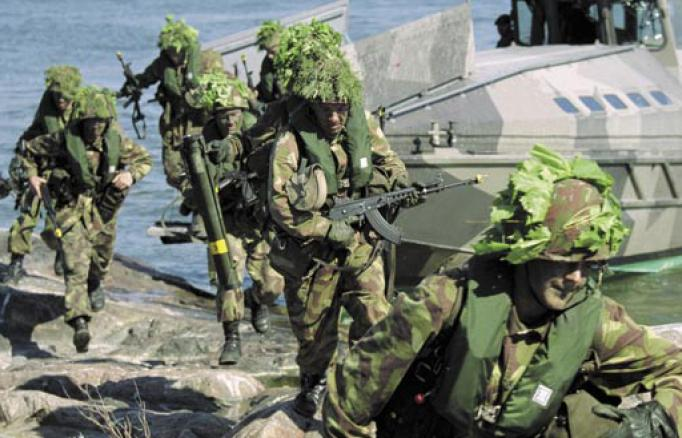
Finnish Coastal Light Infantry in training, 2002

- Uusimaa (Nylands) Brigade (Uudenmaan Prikaati – Nylands Brigad) (Note: It is the only swedish-speaking brigade in the finnish forces, and the unit names can officially be used either in their swedish or finnish form.)
  - Coastal Light Infantry Battalion "Vaasa (Vasa)" (Vaasan Rannikkojääkäripataljoona - Vasa Kustjägarbataljon)
  - Coastal Battalion "Tammisari (Ekenäs)" (Tammisaaren Rannikkopataljoona - Ekenäs Kustbataljon)
- Coastal Brigade (Rannikkoprikaati)
  - Coastal Battalion "Porkkala" (Porkkalan Rannikkopataljoona)
    - Military Police Company (Sotilaspoliisikomppania)
  - Coastal Regiment "Suomenlinna"(Suomenlinnan Rannikkorykmentti)
    - Marine Company (Merikomppania)
  - Marine Intelligence Battalion (Meritiedustelupataljoona)
    - Special Operations Department (Erikoistoimintaosasto)

== France ==
Army

- 3rd Company, 2nd Foreign Parachute Regiment (3e Compagnie ("Amphibie"), 2e Régiment Étranger de Parachutistes)
- 9th Marine Infantry Brigade
- attached units:
  - Marine Infantry Tank Regiment (French:Régiment d'infanterie-chars de marine)
  - 1st Marine Infantry Regiment (French:1er Régiment d'infanterie de Marine)
  - 2nd Marine Infantry Regiment (French:2e Régiment d'infanterie de Marine)
  - 3rd Marine Infantry Regiment (French:3e Régiment d'infanterie de Marine)
  - 126th Infantry Regiment (French:126e Régiment d'infanterie)
  - 11th Marine Artillery Regiment (French:11e Régiment d'Artillerie de Marine)
  - 6th Engineers Regiment (French:6e Régiment du Génie)

Navy

- Marine Fusiliers and Commandos Force (Force des Fusiliers Marins et Commandos)
  - Fusiliers Marins
    - Marine Fusiliers Battalion "Amyot D'Inville" (Bataillon de Fusiliers Marins "Amyot d'Inville")
    - three Marine Fusiliers Companies (Compagnies de Fusiliers Marins)
      - Training Center (Centre d'Entraînement)
        - attached:
          - Marine Fusiliers Company "Bernier" (Compagnie de Fusiliers Marins "Bernier")
          - Marine Fusiliers Company "Brière" (Compagnie de Fusiliers Marins "Brière")
          - Marine Fusiliers Company "Morel" (Compagnie de Fusiliers Marins "Morel")
    - Marine Fusiliers Battalion "Robert Détroyat" (Bataillon de Fusiliers Marins "Détroyat")
      - three Marine Fusiliers Companies (Compagnies de Fusiliers Marins)
      - Training Center (Centre d'Entraînement)
        - attached:
          - Marine Fusiliers Company "Colmay" (Compagnie de Fusiliers Marins "Colmay")
          - Marine Fusiliers Company "Le Sant" (Compagnie de Fusiliers Marins "Le Sant")
    - Marine Fusiliers Battalion "de Morsier" (Bataillon de Fusiliers Marins "de Morsier")
      - two Marine Fusiliers Companies (Compagnies de Fusiliers Marins)
    - Marine Fusiliers Company "le Goffic" (Compagnie de Fusiliers Marins "le Goffic")
    - Marine Fusiliers School (Ecole des Fusiliers Marins)

== Gabon ==
- Marine Fusiliers Company (Compagnie de Fusiliers Marins)

== Georgia ==
- Marine Infantry Battalion (Note: One at cadre strength.)

== Germany ==
- Sea Battalion (Seebataillon)
  - 1st Boarding Company (Bordeinsatzkompanie 1)
  - 2nd Boarding Company (Bordeinsatzkompanien 2)
  - Coastal Operations Company (Küsteneinsatzkompanie)
  - Mine Divers Company (Minentaucherkompanie)
  - Reconnaissance Company (Aufklärungskompanie)
  - Support Company (Unterstützungskompanie)
  - 1st Training Company (Ausbildungskompanie 1)
  - 2nd Training Company (Ausbildungskompanie 2)

== Greece ==
- 32nd Marines Brigade "Moravas" (32η Ταξιαρχία Πεζοναυτών «Mοράβας»)
  - Headquarters Company (Λόχος Διοικήσεως)
  - 505th Marines Battalion-Training Center (505o Τάγμα Πεζοναυτών-Κέντρο Εκπαιδεύσεως)
  - 521st Marines Battalion (521o Τάγμα Πεζοναυτών)
  - 575th Marines Battalion (575o Τάγμα Πεζοναυτών)
  - 32nd Medium Tank Squadron (32η Ιλαρχία Μέσων Αρμάτων)
  - 32nd Field Artillery Battalion (32η Μοίρα Πεδινού Πυροβολικού)
  - 32nd Engineers Company (32 Λόχος Μηχανικού)
  - 32nd Light Air Artillery Battery (32η Πυροβολαρχία Ελαφρού Αντι-Αεροπορικού Πυροβολικού)
  - 32nd Signals Company (32ος Λόχος Διαβιβάσεων)
  - 32nd Support Battalion (32ο Τάγμα Υποστήριξης)
- 13th Special Operations Command "Sacred Company" (13η Διοίκηση Ειδικών Επιχειρήσεων «Ιερός Λόχος»)
  - I Amphibious Raider Squadron (Α΄ Μοίρα Αμφιβίων Καταδρομών)
  - III Amphibious Raider Squadron (Γ΄ Μοίρα Αμφιβίων Καταδρομών)
  - VII Amphibious Raider Squadron (Ζ΄ Μοίρα Αμφιβίων Καταδρομών)
  - VIII Amphibious Raider Squadron (Η΄ Μοίρα Αμφιβίων Καταδρομών)
  - IX Amphibious Raider Squadron (Θ΄ Μοίρα Αμφιβίων Καταδρομών)
  - X Amphibious Raider Squadron (Ι΄ Μοίρα Αμφιβίων Καταδρομών)
  - 13th Signal Company (13ος Λόχος Διαβιβάσεων)

== Guatemala ==
- Marine Infantry Brigade (Brigada de Infantería de Marina)
- Naval Special Forces (Fuerzas Especiales Navales)

== Guinea-Bissau ==
- Naval Fusiliers Corps (Corpo dos Fuzileiros Navais)

== Honduras ==
- 1st Marine Infantry Battalion (1o Batallón de Infantería de Marina)
- 2nd Marine Infantry Battalion (2o Batallón de Infantería de Marina)
- Naval Special Force (Fuerza Especial Naval)

== India ==
- Army
  - 54th Infantry Division
    - 91st Infantry Brigade
  - 340th Independent Brigade
- Navy
  - Marine Commando Force

== Indonesia ==
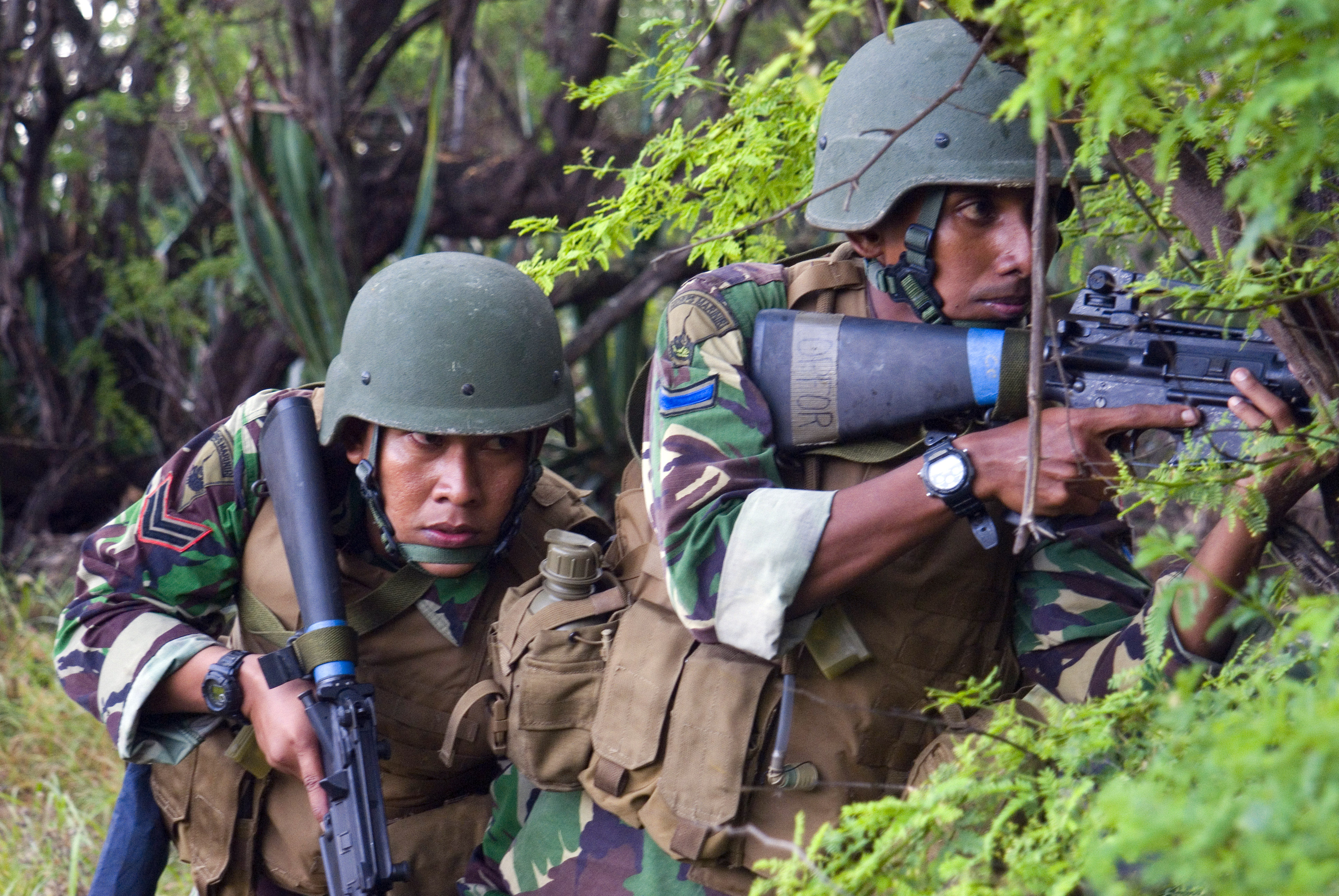
Indonesian Marines in training, 2008

- Indonesian Marine Corps (Korps Marinir) which is under the Indonesian Navy with its organization as below:
  - Combat Scouts Team (Regu Pandu Tempur)
  - Marine Force I (Pasukan Marinir I)
    - 1st Infantry Brigade (Marines) (Brigade Infanteri 1 (Marinir))
      - 2nd Infantry Battalion (Marines) (Batalyon Infanteri 2 (Marinir))
      - 4th Infantry Battalion (Marines) (Batalyon Infanteri 4 (Marinir))
      - 6th Infantry Battalion (Marines) (Batalyon Infanteri 6 (Marinir))
    - 1st Artillery Regiment (Marines) (Resimen Artileri 1 (Marinir))
      - 1st Howitzer Battalion (Marines) (Batalyon Howitzer 1 (Marinir))
      - 1st Rocket Battalion (Marines) (Batalyon Roket 1 (Marinir))
      - 1st Anti Aircraft Artillery Battalion (Marines) (Batalyon Artileri Pertahanan Udara 1 (Marinir))
    - 1st Cavalry Regiment (Marines) (Resimen Kavaleri 1 (Marinir))
      - 1st Amphibious Landing Vehicle Battalion (Batalyon Kendaraan Pendarat Amfibi 1 (Marinir))
      - 1st Amphibious Tank Battalion (Marines) (Batalyon Tank Amfibi 1 (Marinir))
      - 1st Amphibious Artillery Vehicle Battalion (Marnes) (Batalyon Kendaraan Amfibi Pengangkut Artileri 1 (Marinir))
    - 1st Combat Support Regiment (Marines) (Resimen Bantuan Tempur 1 (Marinir))
      - 1st Motorized Transport Battalion (Marines) (Batalyon Angkutan Bermotor 1 (Marinir))
      - 1st Communications and Electronic Battalion (Marines) (Batalyon Komunikasi dan Elektronika 1 (Marinir))
      - 1st Supply and Equipment Battalion (Marines) (Batalyon Perbekalan dan Peralatan 1 (Marinir))
      - 1st Engineer Battalion (Marines) (Batalyon Zeni 1 (Marinir))
      - 1st Medical Battalion (Marines) (Batalyon Kesehatan 1 (Marinir))
      - 1st Military Police Battalion (Marines) (Batalyon Polisi Militer 1 (Marinir))
    - 1st Amphibious Reconnaissance Battalion (Marines) (Batalyon Intai Amfibi 1 (Marinir))
    - 1st Marines Base Defense Battalion (Batalyon Marinir Pertahanan Pangkalan I)
    - 2nd Marines Base Defense Battalion (Batalyon Marinir Pertahanan Pangkalan II)
    - 3rd Marines Base Defense Battalion (Batalyon Marinir Pertahanan Pangkalan III)
    - 4th Marines Base Defense Battalion (Batalyon Marinir Pertahanan Pangkalan IV)
    - 12th Marines Base Defense Battalion (Batalyon Marinir Pertahanan Pangkalan XII)
  - Marine Force II (Pasukan Marinir II)
    - 2nd Infantry Brigade (Marines) (Brigade Infanteri 2 (Marinir))
      - 1st Infantry Battalion (Marines) (Batalyon Infanteri 1 (Marinir))
      - 3rd Infantry Battalion (Marines) (Batalyon Infanteri 3 (Marinir))
      - 5th Infantry Battalion (Marines) (Batalyon Infanteri 5 (Marinir))
    - 2nd Artillery Regiment (Marines) (Resimen Artileri 2 (Marinir))
      - 2nd Howitzer Battalion (Marines) (Batalyon Howitzer 2 (Marinir))
      - 2nd Rocket Battalion (Marines) (Batalyon Roket 2 (Marinir))
      - 2nd Anti Aircraft Artillery Battalion (Marines) (Batalyon Artileri Pertahanan Udara 2 (Marinir))
    - 2nd Cavalry Regiment (Marines) (Resimen Kavaleri 2 (Marinir))
      - 2nd Amphibious Landing Vehicle Battalion (Batalyon Kendaraan Pendarat Amfibi 2 (Marinir))
      - 2nd Amphibious Tank Battalion (Marines) (Batalyon Tank Amfibi 2 (Marinir))
      - 2nd Amphibious Artillery Vehicle Battalion (Marnes) (Batalyon Kendaraan Amfibi Pengangkut Artileri 2 (Marinir))
    - 2nd Combat Support Regiment (Marines) (Resimen Bantuan Tempur 2 (Marinir))
      - 2nd Motorized Transport Battalion (Marines) (Batalyon Angkutan Bermotor 2 (Marinir))
      - 2nd Communications and Electronic Battalion (Marines) (Batalyon Komunikasi dan Elektronika 2 (Marinir))
      - 2nd Supply and Equipment Battalion (Marines) (Batalyon Perbekalan dan Peralatan 2 (Marinir))
      - 2nd Engineer Battalion (Marines) (Batalyon Zeni 2 (Marinir))
      - 2nd Medical Battalion (Marines) (Batalyon Kesehatan 2 (Marinir))
      - 2nd Military Police Battalion (Marines) (Batalyon Polisi Militer 2 (Marinir))
    - 2nd Amphibious Reconnaissance Battalion (Marines) (Batalyon Intai Amfibi 2 (Marinir))
    - 5th Marines Base Defense Battalion (Batalyon Marinir Pertahanan Pangkalan V)
    - 6th Marines Base Defense Battalion (Batalyon Marinir Pertahanan Pangkalan VI)
    - 7th Marines Base Defense Battalion (Batalyon Marinir Pertahanan Pangkalan VII)
    - 8th Marines Base Defense Battalion (Batalyon Marinir Pertahanan Pangkalan VIII)
    - 9th Marines Base Defense Battalion (Batalyon Marinir Pertahanan Pangkalan IX)
  - Marine Force III (Pasukan Marinir III)
    - 3rd Infantry Brigade (Marines) (Brigade Infanteri 3 (Marinir))
      - 11th Infantry Battalion (Marines) (Batalyon Infanteri 11 (Marinir))
    - 3rd Artillery Regiment (Marines) (Resimen Artileri 3 (Marinir))
    - 3rd Cavalry Regiment (Marines) (Resimen Kavaleri 3 (Marinir))
    - 3rd Combat Support Regiment (Marines) (Resimen Bantuan Tempur 3 (Marinir))
    - 3rd Amphibious Reconnaissance Battalion (Marines) (Batalyon Intai Amfibi 3 (Marinir))
    - 10th Marines Base Defense Battalion (Batalyon Marinir Pertahanan Pangkalan X)
    - 11th Marines Base Defense Battalion (Batalyon Marinir Pertahanan Pangkalan XI)
    - 13th Marines Base Defense Battalion (Batalyon Marinir Pertahanan Pangkalan XIII)
    - 14th Marines Base Defense Battalion (Batalyon Marinir Pertahanan Pangkalan XIV)
  - 4th Infantry Brigade (Marines) (Independent) (Brigade Infanteri 4 (Marinir) (Bendiri Sendiri))
    - 7th Infantry Battalion (Marines) (Batalyon Infanteri 7 (Marinir))
    - 8th Infantry Battalion (Marines) (Batalyon Infanteri 8 (Marinir))
    - 9th Infantry Battalion (Marines) (Batalyon Infanteri 9 (Marinir))
    - 10th Infantry Battalion (Marines) (Batalyon Infanteri 10 (Marinir))
  - Marines Corps Training Command (Komando Latih Korps Marinir)
    - Landing Forces Training Center (Pusat Latihan Pasukan Pendarat)
    - Special Forces Training Center (Pusat Latihan Pasukan Khussus)
    - Amphibious Landing Training & Combat Readiness Center (Pusat Latihan Pendarat Amfibi & Kesiapan Tempur)
    - Marines Combat Training Center Damar Island (Pusat Pelatihan Tempur Marinir Pulau Damar)
    - 3rd Marines Combat Training Center (Pusat Latihan Tempur Marinir 3)
    - 4th Marines Combat Training Center (Pusat Latihan Tempur Marinir 4)
    - 5th Marines Combat Training Center (Pusat Latihan Tempur Marinir 5)
    - 6th Marines Combat Training Center (Pusat Latihan Tempur Marinir 6)
    - 7th Marines Combat Training Center (Pusat Latihan Tempur Marinir 7)
    - 8th Marines Combat Training Center (Pusat Latihan Tempur Marinir 8)
  - Marine Base Jakarta (Pangkalan Marinir Jakarta)
  - Marine Base Surabaya (Pangkalan Marinir Surabaya)
  - Marine Base Sorong (Pangkalan Marinir Sorong)

== Iran ==
- Navy
  - 1st Marine Riflemen Brigade "Imam Hossein" (تیپ یکم تفنگداران دریایی امام حسین - Tap Akem Tefnegudaran Deraaaa "Amam Hesan")
  - 2nd Marine Riflemen Brigade "Prophet Messenger of God" (تیپ دوم تفنگداران دریایی حضرت رسول اکرم - Tap Dewm Tefnegudaran Deraaaa "Hedret Reswel Akerem")
  - 3rd Marine Riflemen Brigade "Chief of the Martyrs Hamza" (تیپ سوم تفنگداران دریایی حمزه سیدالشهداء - Tap Sewm Tefnegudaran Deraaaa "Hemzh Sadaleshheda")
  - 4th Marine Riflemen Brigade "Imam Reza" (تیپ چهارم تفنگداران دریایی امام رضا - Tap Cheharem Tefnegudaran Deraaaa "Amam Reda")
- Revolutionary Guards
  - Naval Special Forces (نیروی ویژه دریایی - Narewa Wajeh Deraaaa)
  - Infantry پایور

== Iraq ==
- 1st Marine Brigade Special Troops Battalion

== Israel ==
The IDF's 35th Parachute Brigade "Flying Serpent" is a paratroopers brigade that also exercises sea landing capabilities.

- Army
  - 98th Parachute Division (Reserve) "Fire Formation"
    - 35th Parachute Brigade "Flying Serpent"
      - 101st Parachute Battalion "Cobra"
      - 202nd Parachute Battalion "Viper"
      - 890th Parachute Battalion "Adder"
      - 5135th Reconnaissance Battalion "Flying Serpent"

== Italy ==
The Italian Army's Cavalry Brigade "Pozzuolo del Friuli" forms with the Italian Navy's 3rd Naval Division and San Marco Marine Brigade the Italian military's National Sea Projection Capability (Forza di proiezione dal mare).

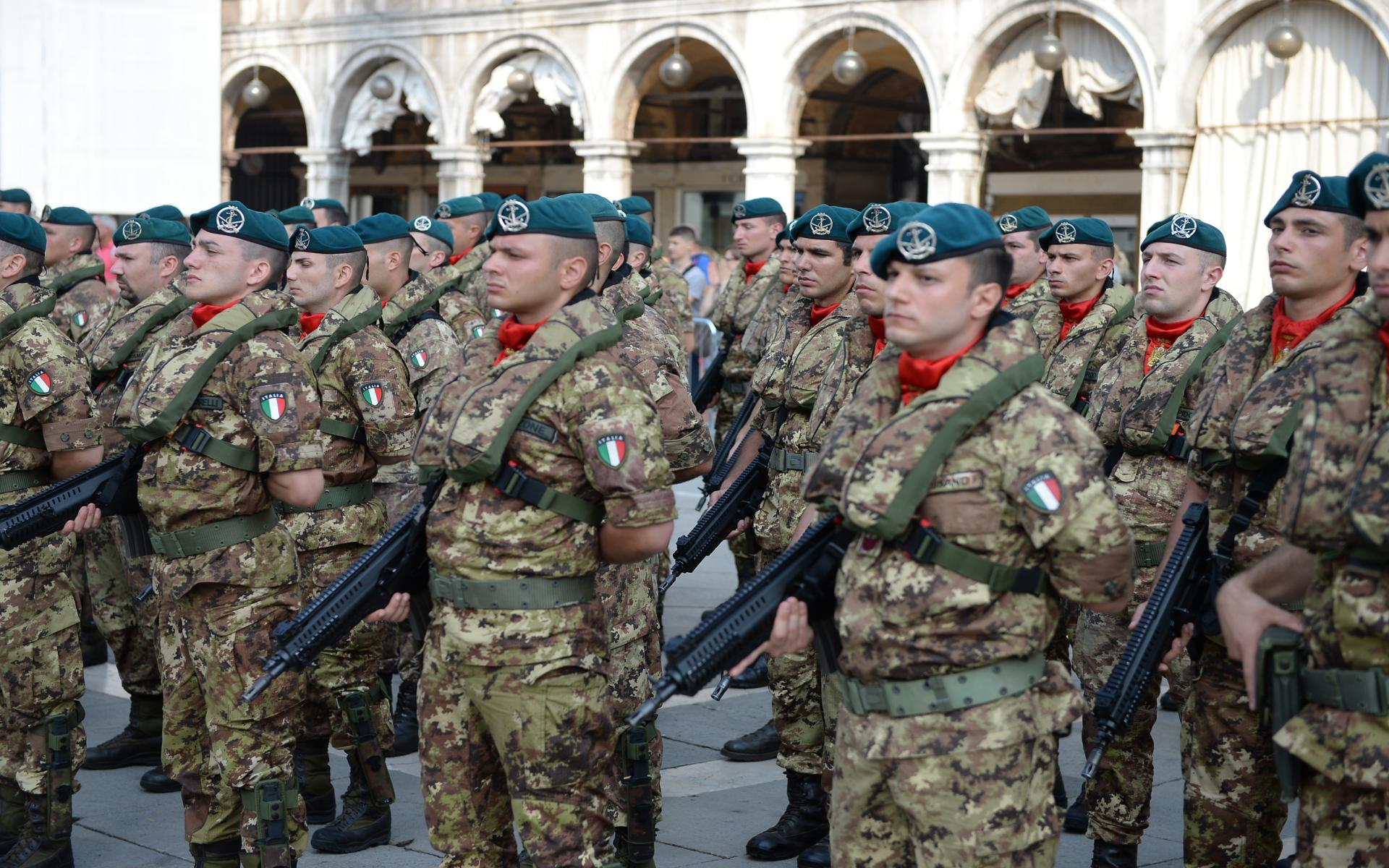
Lagunari Regiment on parade, 2017

- Italian Army
  - Cavalry Brigade "Pozzuolo del Friuli" (Brigata di Cavalleria "Pozzuolo del Friuli")
    - Regiment "Genova Cavalleria" (4th) (Reggimento "Genova Cavalleria" (4°))
      - 2x Reconnaissance Squadrons
    - Lagunari Regiment "Serenissima" (Reggimento Lagunari "Serenissima")
    - Field Artillery Regiment "a Cavallo" (Reggimento Artiglieria Terrestre "a Cavallo")
      - 2x Artillery Batteries
    - 3rd Engineer Regiment (3° Reggimento Genio Guastatori)
      - 2x Amphibious Engineer Companies (Compagnia Guastatori Anfibi)
    - Logistic Regiment "Pozzuolo del Friuli"

Additionally the 17th Anti-aircraft Artillery Regiment "Sforzesca" provides air-defense assets:

- 17th Anti-aircraft Artillery Regiment "Sforzesca" (17° Reggimento Artiglieria Controaerei "Sforzesca")
  - 2x VSHORAD Anti-aircraft Artillery Batteries

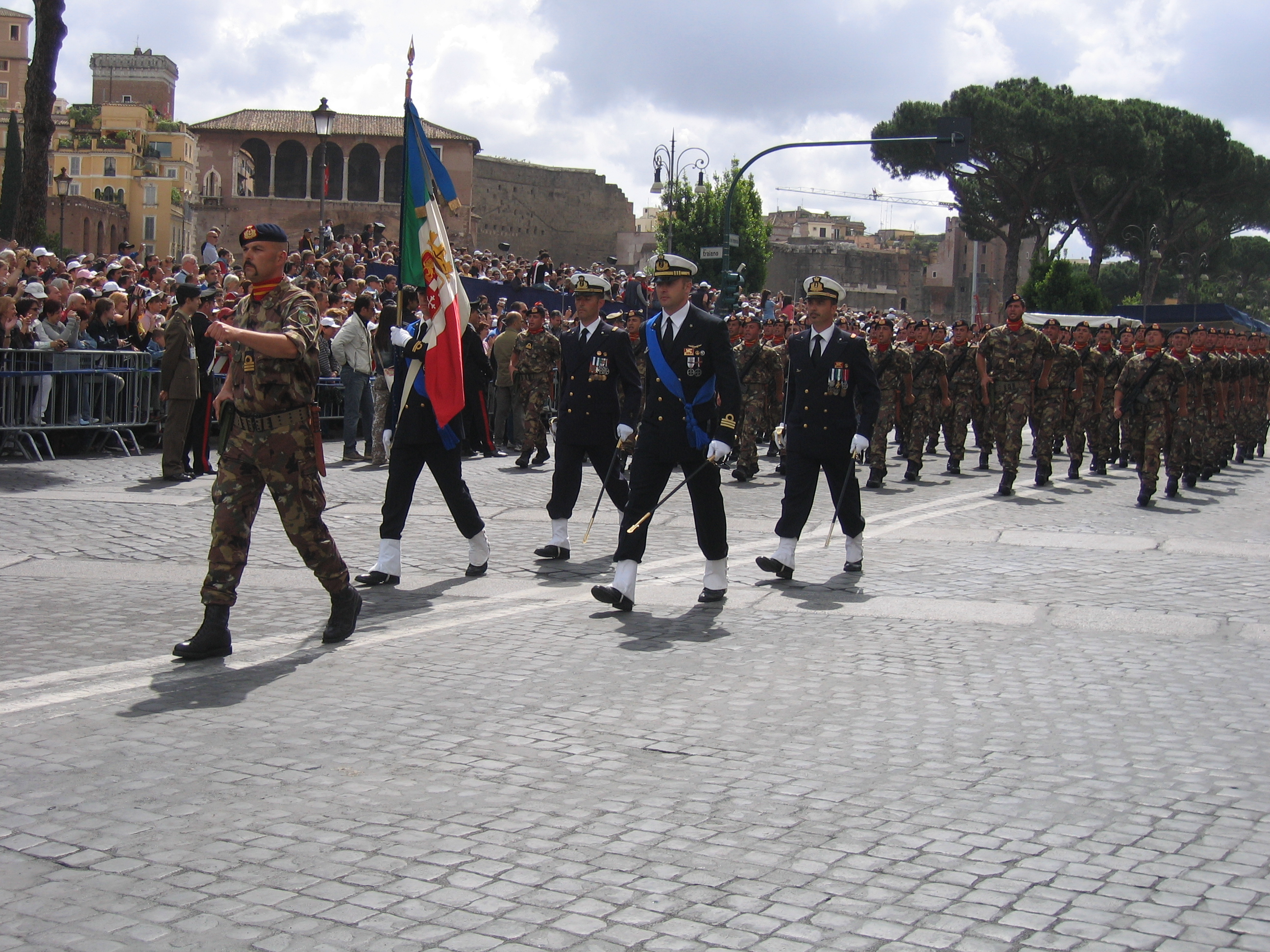
Italian Navy "San Marco" 1st Regiment on parade, 2007

- Navy
  - Marine Brigade "San Marco"" (Brigata Marina "San Marco")
    - 1st Regiment "San Marco" (1° Reggimento "San Marco")
      - 1st Assault Battalion "Grado" (1° Battaglione Assalto "Grado")
      - 2nd Assault Battalion "Venezia" (2° Battaglione Assalto "Venezia")
      - 3rd Combat Logistic Support Battalion "Golametto" (3° Battaglione Supporto Logistico al Combattimento "Golametto")
      - Parachute Swimmers Company (Compagnia Nuotatori Paracadutisti)
    - 2nd Regiment "San Marco" (2° Reggimento "San Marco")
      - Naval Operations Battalion (Battaglione Operazioni Navali)
      - Interdiction and Protection Battalion (Battaglione Interdizione e Protezione)
    - 3rd Regiment "San Marco" (3° Reggimento "San Marco")
      - Installations Defence Service Battalion "North" (Battaglione Servizio Difesa Installazioni "Nord")
      - Installations Defence Service Battalion "Center - Rome" (Battaglione Servizio Difesa Installazioni "Centro - Roma")
      - Installations Defence Service Battalion "South" (Battaglione Servizio Difesa Installazioni "Sud")
    - Landing Crafts Group (Gruppo Mezzi da Sbarco)
    - Training Battalion "Caorle" (Battaglione Scuole "Caorle")
- Carabinieri
  - Amphibious platoons, 1st Paratroopers Carabinieri Regiment "Tuscania" (1° Reggimento Carabinieri Paracadutisti "Tuscania")

== Ivory Coast ==
- Marine Fusiliers Commando Group (Groupe des Fusiliers Marins Commando)

== Japan ==
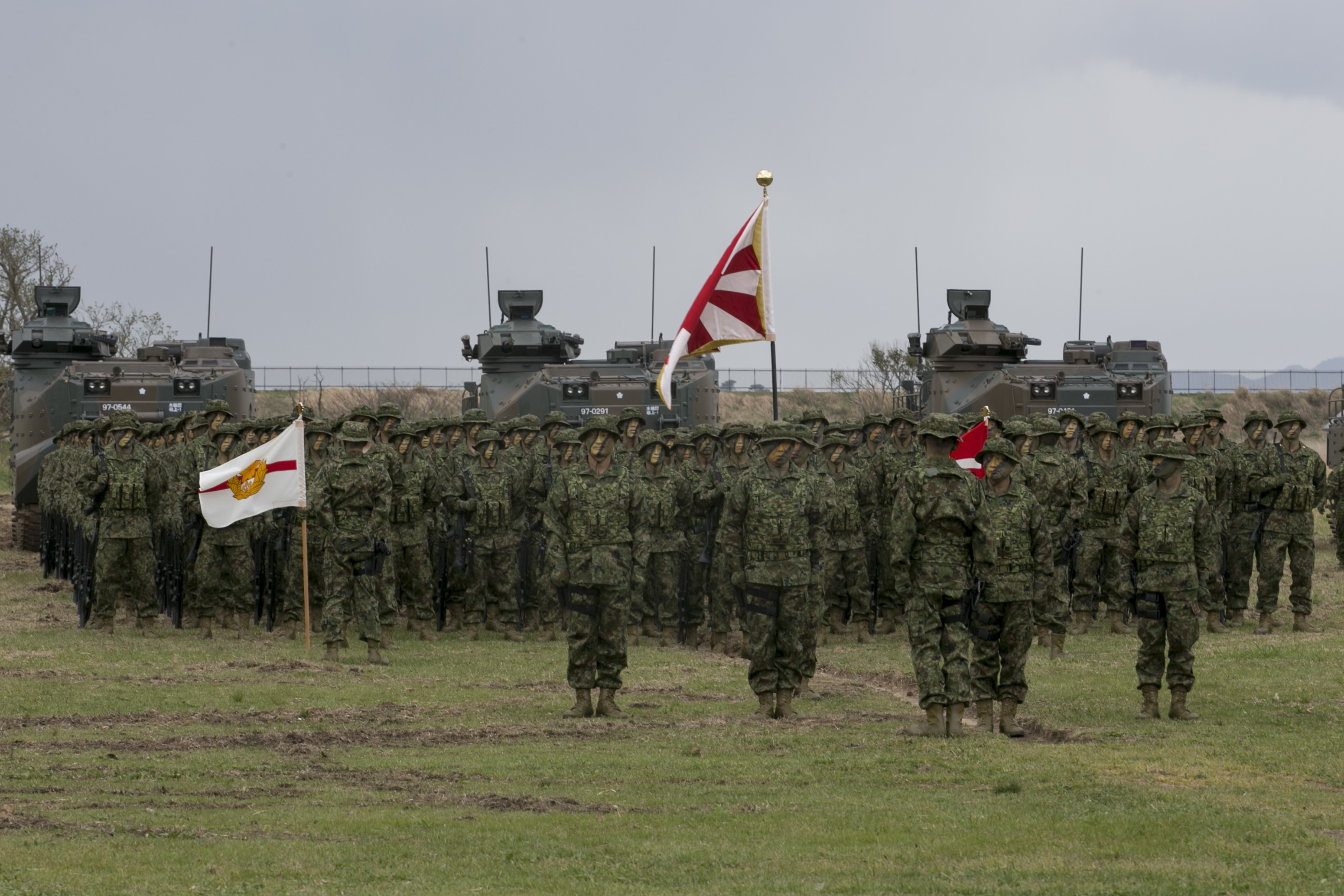
Activation ceremony of the Japanese Amphibious Brigade, 7 April 2018

- Amphibious Rapid Deployment Brigade (水陸機動団 - Suirikukidōdan)
  - 1st Amphibious Rapid Deployment Regiment (第1水陸機動連隊 - Dai 1 Suiriku Kidō Rentai)
  - 2nd Amphibious Rapid Deployment Regiment (第2水陸機動連隊 - Dai 2 Suiriku Kidō Rentai)
  - Combat Landing Battalion (戦闘上陸大隊 - Sentō Jōriku Daitai)
  - Artillery Battalion (特科大隊 - Tokkadaitai)
  - Logistic Support Battalion (後方支援大隊 - Kōhōshien Daitai)
  - Signal Company (通信中隊 - Tsūshin Chūtai)
  - Reconnaissance Company (偵察中隊 – Teisatsu Chūtai)
  - Engineer Company (施設中隊 - Shisetsu Chūtai)
  - Amphibious Rapid Deployment Training Unit (水陸機動教育隊 - Suiriku Kidō Kyōiku-tai)

== Jordan ==
- 77th Marine Reconnaissance Battalion

== Kazakhstan ==
- 390th Independent Guard Naval Infantry Brigade (390-шы жеке гвардиялық теңіз жаяу әскерлері бригадасы - 390-şı Jeke Gvardïyalıq Teñiz Jayaw Äskerleri Brïgadası)

== Kenya ==
- Navy
  - Special Operations Squadron

== Kuwait ==
- one Marines Commando unit

== Lebanon ==
- Marine Commando unit (مغاوير البحر - Maghāwīr al Baħr)

== Lithuania ==
- Lithuanian Armed Forces
  - Navy
    - General Kazimieras Nestoras Sapiega Fusiliers Battalion (Generolo Kazimiero Nestoro Sapiegos fuzilierių batalionas)
  - Special Operations Force
    - Combat Divers Service (KNT - Kovinių narų tarnyba)
- Lithuanian Riflemen's Union
  - West (Sea) Riflemen 3rd Territorial Riflemen Unit

== Madagascar ==
- 2nd Intervention Forces Regiment (2me Régiment des Forces d'Intervention)

== Malaysia ==
- Army
  - 21st Special Mobility Group (21 Grup Gerak Khas - ݢروڤ ݢرق خاص 21)
  - 9th Battalion Royal Malay Regiment (Para) (Batalion ke-9 Rejimen Askar Melayu Diraja (Para))
- Navy
  - Naval Special Forces (Pasukan Khas Laut - ڤاسوقن خاص لاءوت)

== Malawi ==
- one Marines unit

== Maldives ==
- Marine Corps

== Mauritania ==
- Marine Fusiliers Group (Groupement de Fusiliers Marins)

== Mexico ==
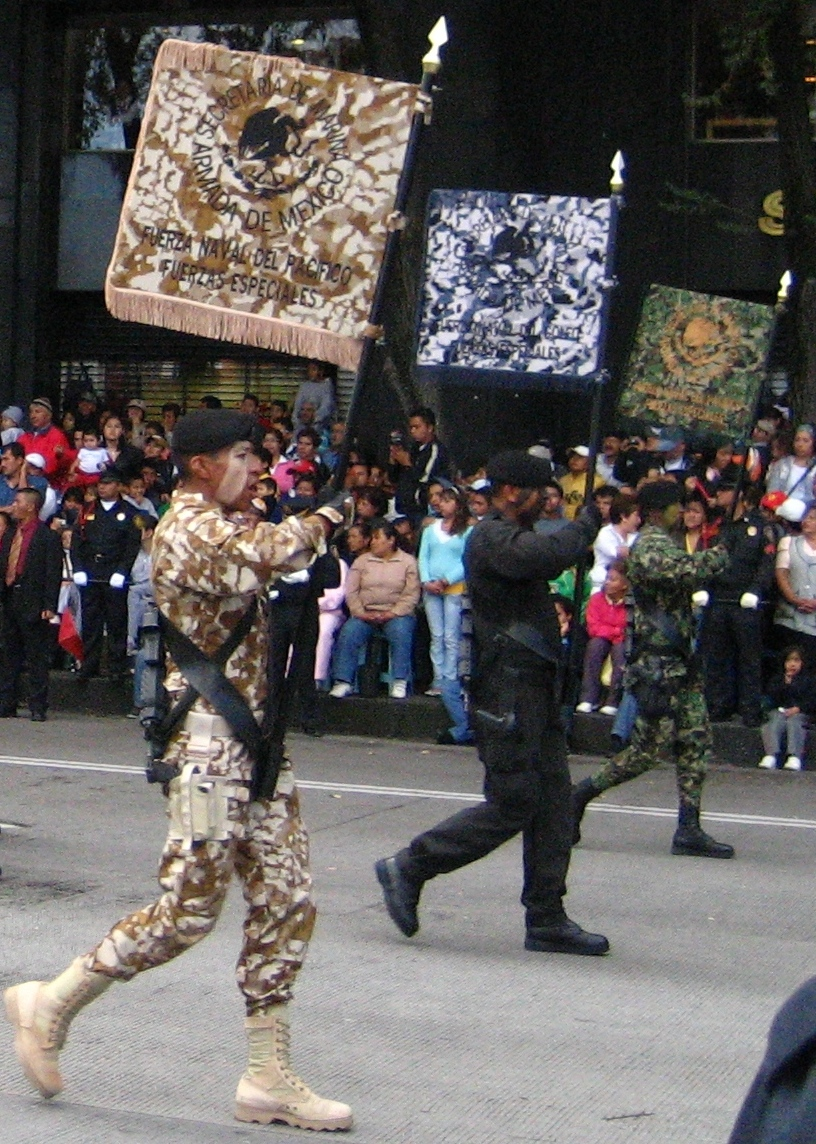
Mexican Marine Infantry special forces on parade, 2009

- Army
  - Jungle and Amphibious Operations Training Sub-Center (Subcentro de Adiestramiento de Operaciones en Selva y Anfibias)
- Marine Infantry Corps (Cuerpo de Infantería de Marina)
  - 1st Marine Infantry Brigade (1ª Brigada de Infantería de Marina)
    - 1st Marine Infantry Battalion (1 Batallón de Infanteria de Marina)
    - 3rd Marine Infantry Battalion (3 Batallón de Infanteria de Marina)
    - 5th Marine Infantry Battalion (5 Batallón de Infanteria de Marina)
    - 7th Marine Infantry Battalion (7 Batallón de Infanteria de Marina)
    - 9th Marine Infantry Battalion (9 Batallón de Infanteria de Marina)
  - 2nd Marine Infantry Brigade (2ª Brigada de Infantería de Marina)
    - 2nd Marine Infantry Battalion (2 Batallón de Infanteria de Marina)
  - 3rd Marine Infantry Brigade (3ª Brigada de Infantería de Marina)
    - 11th Marine Infantry Battalion (11 Batallón de Infanteria de Marina)
    - 13th Marine Infantry Battalion (13 Batallón de Infanteria de Marina)
    - 15th Marine Infantry Battalion (15 Batallón de Infanteria de Marina)
    - 17th Marine Infantry Battalion (17 Batallón de Infanteria de Marina)
  - 4th Marine Infantry Brigade (4ª Brigada de Infantería de Marina)
    - 4th Marine Infantry Battalion (4 Batallón de Infanteria de Marina)
    - 6th Marine Infantry Battalion (6 Batallón de Infanteria de Marina)
    - 8th Marine Infantry Battalion (8 Batallón de Infanteria de Marina)
    - 10th Marine Infantry Battalion (10 Batallón de Infanteria de Marina)
    - 12th Marine Infantry Battalion (12 Batallón de Infanteria de Marina)
  - 5th Marine Infantry Brigade (5ª Brigada de Infantería de Marina)
    - 19th Marine Infantry Battalion (19 Batallón de Infanteria de Marina)
    - 21st Marine Infantry Battalion (21 Batallón de Infanteria de Marina)
    - 23rd Marine Infantry Battalion (23 Batallón de Infanteria de Marina)
    - 25th Marine Infantry Battalion (25 Batallón de Infanteria de Marina)
  - 6th Marine Infantry Brigade (6ª Brigada de Infantería de Marina)
    - 14th Marine Infantry Battalion (14 Batallón de Infanteria de Marina)
    - 16th Marine Infantry Battalion (16 Batallón de Infanteria de Marina)
    - 18th Marine Infantry Battalion (18 Batallón de Infanteria de Marina)
    - 20th Marine Infantry Battalion (20 Batallón de Infanteria de Marina)
  - 7th Marine Infantry Brigade (7ª Brigada de Infantería de Marina)
    - Marine Infantry Parachute Battalion (Batallón de Infantería de Marina de Fusileros Paracaidistas)
    - 24th Marine Infantry Presidential Guard Battalion (24 Batallón de Infantería de Marina de Guardias Presidenciales)
    - 27th Marine Infantry Battalion (27 Batallón de Infanteria de Marina)
    - 29th Marine Infantry Battalion (29 Batallón de Infanteria de Marina)
  - 8th Marine Infantry Brigade (8ª Brigada de Infantería de Marina)
    - 22nd Marine Infantry Battalion (22 Batallón de Infanteria de Marina)
    - 28th Marine Infantry Battalion (28 Batallón de Infanteria de Marina)
    - 30th Marine Infantry Battalion (30 Batallón de Infanteria de Marina)
    - 32nd Marine Infantry Battalion (32 Batallón de Infanteria de Marina)
  - Marine Infantry Amphibious Brigade of the Gulf (Brigada Anfibia de Infantería de Marina del Golfo)
    - 1st Marine Infantry Amphibious Battalion of the Gulf (1 Batallón Anfibio de Infanteria de Marina del Golfo)
    - 2nd Marine Infantry Amphibious Battalion of the Gulf (2 Batallón Anfibio de Infanteria de Marina del Golfo)
    - 3rd Marine Infantry Amphibious Battalion of the Gulf (3 Batallón Anfibio de Infanteria de Marina del Golfo)
    - Marine Infantry Amphibious Assault Battalion of the Gulf (Batallón de Asalto Anfibio de Infantería de Marina del Golfo)
    - Marine Infantry Artillery Battalion of the Gulf (Batallón de Artillería de Infantería de Marina del Golfo)
    - Marine Infantry Boats and Amphibious Vehicles Battalion of the Gulf (Batallón de Embarcaciones y Vehículos Anfibios del Golfo)
    - Marine Infantry Services Group of the Gulf (Agrupamiento de Servicios de Infantería de Marina del Golfo)
    - Special Weapons Battalion of the Gulf (Batallón de Armas Especiales del Golfo)
  - Marine Infantry Amphibious Brigade of the Pacific (Brigada Anfibia de Infantería de Marina (Pacifico))
    - 1st Marine Infantry Amphibious Battalion of the Pacific (1 Batallón Anfibio de Infanteria de Marina del Pacifico)
    - 2nd Marine Infantry Amphibious Battalion of the Pacific (2 Batallón Anfibio de Infanteria de Marina del Pacifico)
    - 3rd Marine Infantry Amphibious Battalion of the Pacific (3 Batallón Anfibio de Infanteria de Marina del Pacifico)
    - Marine Infantry Amphibious Assault Battalion of the Pacific (Batallón de Asalto Anfibio de Infantería de Marina del Pacific)
    - Marine Infantry Artillery Battalion of the Pacific (Batallón de Artillería de Infantería de Marina del Pacifico)
    - Marine Infantry Boats and Amphibious Vehicles Battalion of the Pacific (Batallón de Embarcaciones y Vehículos Anfibios del Pacifico)
    - Marine Infantry Services Group of the Pacific (Agrupamiento de Servicios de Infantería de Marina del Pacifico)
    - Special Weapons Battalion of the Pacific (Batallón de Armas Especiales del Pacifico)
  - Marine Infantry Special Operations Brigade (Brigada de Infantería de Marina de Operaciones Especiales)
    - Special Forces Group of the Gulf (Grupo Fuerzas Especiales del Golfo)
    - Special Forces Group of the Center (Grupo Fuerzas Especiales del Centro)
    - Special Forces Group of the Pacific (Grupo Fuerzas Especiales del Pacifico)
  - Marine Infantry Qualifying and Specialized Training Center (Centro de Capacitación y Adiestramiento Especializado de Infantería de Marina)

== Montenegro ==
- Special Support Battalion (Bataljon za Borbenu Podršku)
  - Naval Detachment ( Поморскi Oдред - Pomorski Odred)

== Morocco ==
- 1st Royal Navy Infantry Battalion (الكتيبة الاولى لمشاة البحرية الملكية - Al-Katibat al'Uwlaa Limushat al-Bahriat al-Malakia)
- 2nd Royal Navy Infantry Battalion (الكتيبة الثاني لمشاة البحرية الملكية - Al-Katibat al-Ththani Limushat al-Bahriat al-Malakia)
- 3rd Royal Navy Infantry Battalion ( الكتيبة الثالثة من مشاة البحرية الملكية - Al-Katibat al-Ththalithat Limushat al-Bahriat al-Malakia)

== Mozambique ==
- Marine Fusiliers Battalion (Batalhão dos Fuzileiros Navais)
- Naval Fusiliers School ( Escola de Fuzileiros Navais)

== Myanmar ==
- one Marine Light Infantry Battalion

== Namibia ==
- Marine Corps Battalion
- Marine Corps and Naval Training School

== Netherlands ==
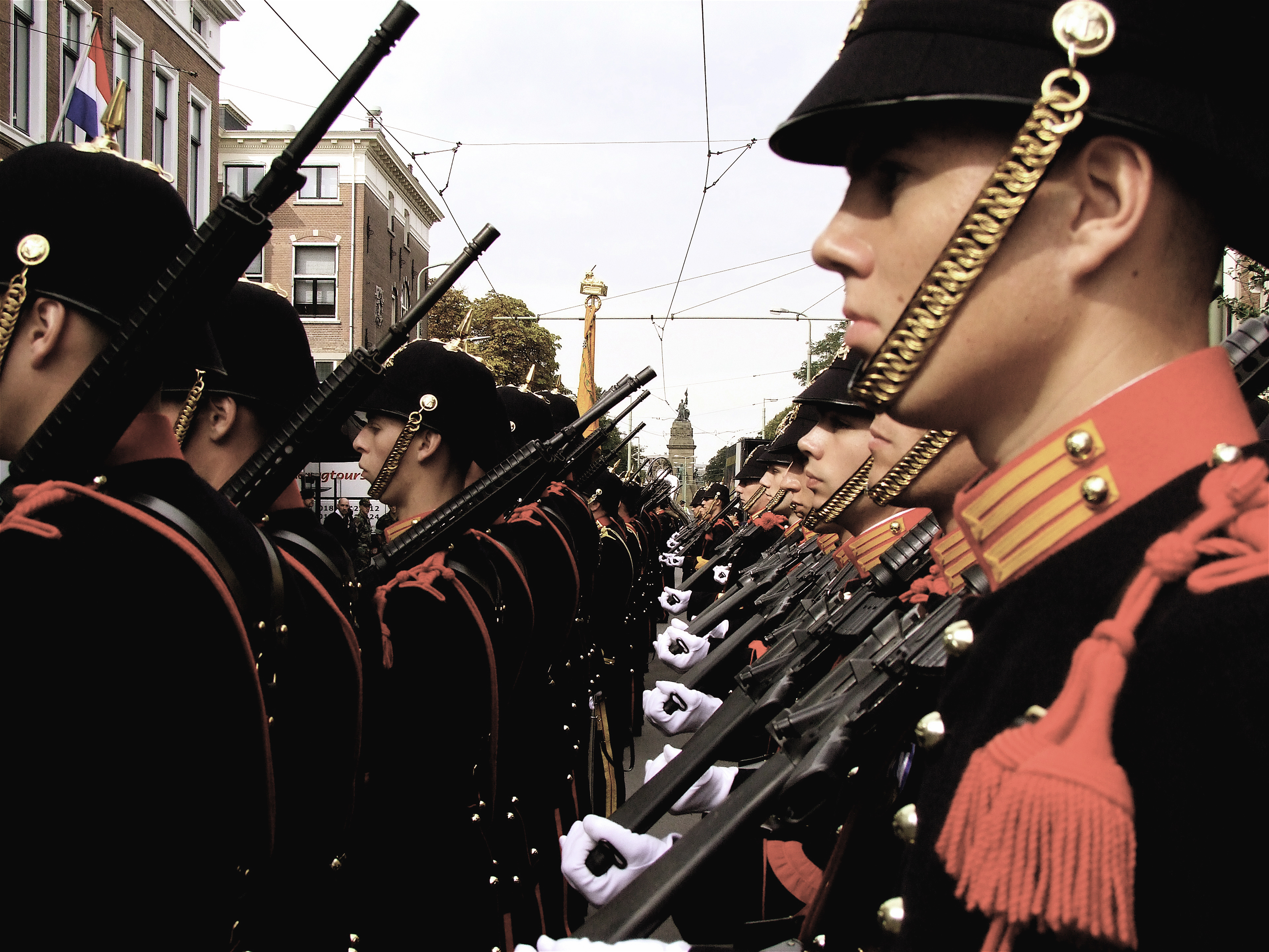
Dutch Mariniers ceremonial uniforms

- Marines Corps (Korps Mariniers)
  - 1st Amphibious Combat Group (1e Amfibische Gevechtsgroep)
  - 2nd Amphibious Combat Group (2e Amfibische Gevechtsgroep)
  - Maritime Special Operations Forces
  - Marines Squadron Caribbean Area (Mariniers Squadron Caribisch Gebied)
  - Marines Training Center (Mariniers Opleidingscentrum)

== Nicaragua ==
- 1st Marine Battalion "Commander Richard Lugo Kautz" (1er Batallón de Tropas Navales "Comandante Richard Lugo Kautz")
- Interior Waters Naval Detachment "Commander Hilario Sánchez Vásquez" (Destacamento Naval de Aguas Interiores "Comandante Hilario Sánchez Vásquez")
- Naval Special Operations Detachment (Destacamento de Operaciones Especiales Navales)

== Nigeria ==
- 403rd Amphibious Brigade
- Nigerian Navy Marines

== North Korea ==
- 24th Amphibious Snipers Brigade (제24해상저격여단 - je24 Haesang Jeogyeog-yeodan)
- 29th Amphibious Snipers Brigade (제29해상저격여단 - je29 Haesang Jeogyeog-yeodan)
- 64th Amphibious Snipers Brigade (제64해상저격여단 - je64 Haesang Jeogyeog-yeodan)
- 87th Amphibious Snipers Brigade (제87해상저격여단 - je87 Haesang Jeogyeog-yeodan)

== Norway ==
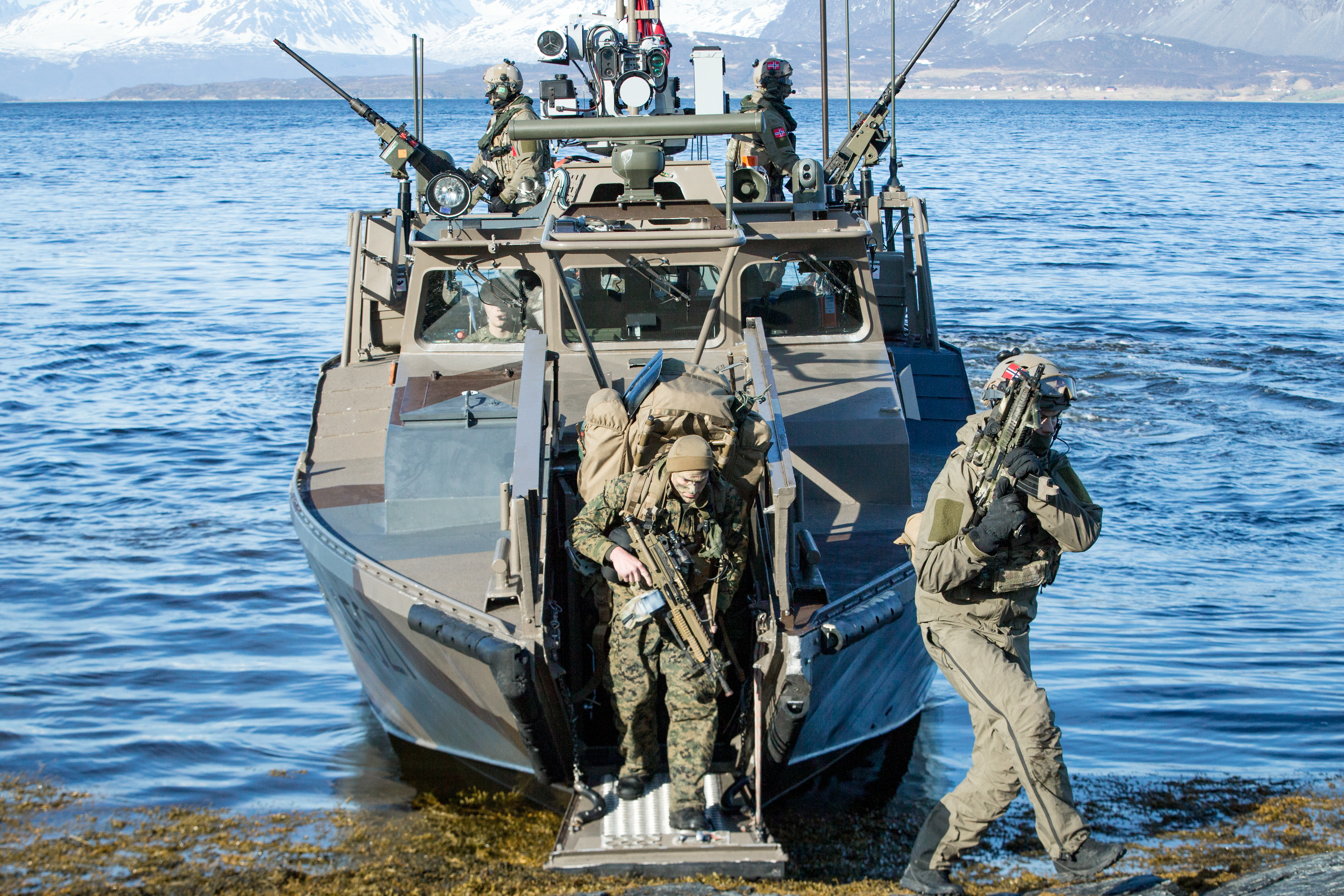
Coastal Ranger Command with the United States Marine Corps during the exercise Platinum Ren in May 2019.

- Coastal Ranger Command (Kystjegerkommandoen)
- Naval Special Operations Command (Marinejegerkommandoen)

== Pakistan ==
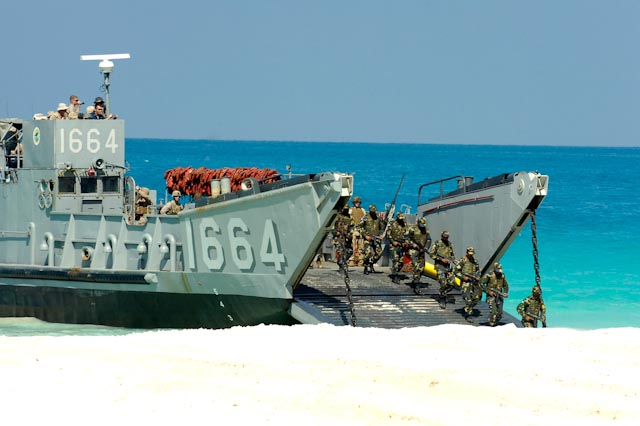
Pakistan Marines landing during the Bright Star 2009 exercise in Alexandria.

- Pakistan Marines (پاکستان میرینز; )
  - 1st Marines Battalion
  - 2nd Marines Battalion
  - 3rd Marines Battalion
  - 21st Air Defence Battalion
  - Riverine Battalion
  - Marines Amphibious Wing
  - Marines Training Center

== Panama ==
- Air-naval Infantry (Infantería Aeronaval)
- Air-naval Commandos (Comandos Aeronavales)

== Paraguay ==
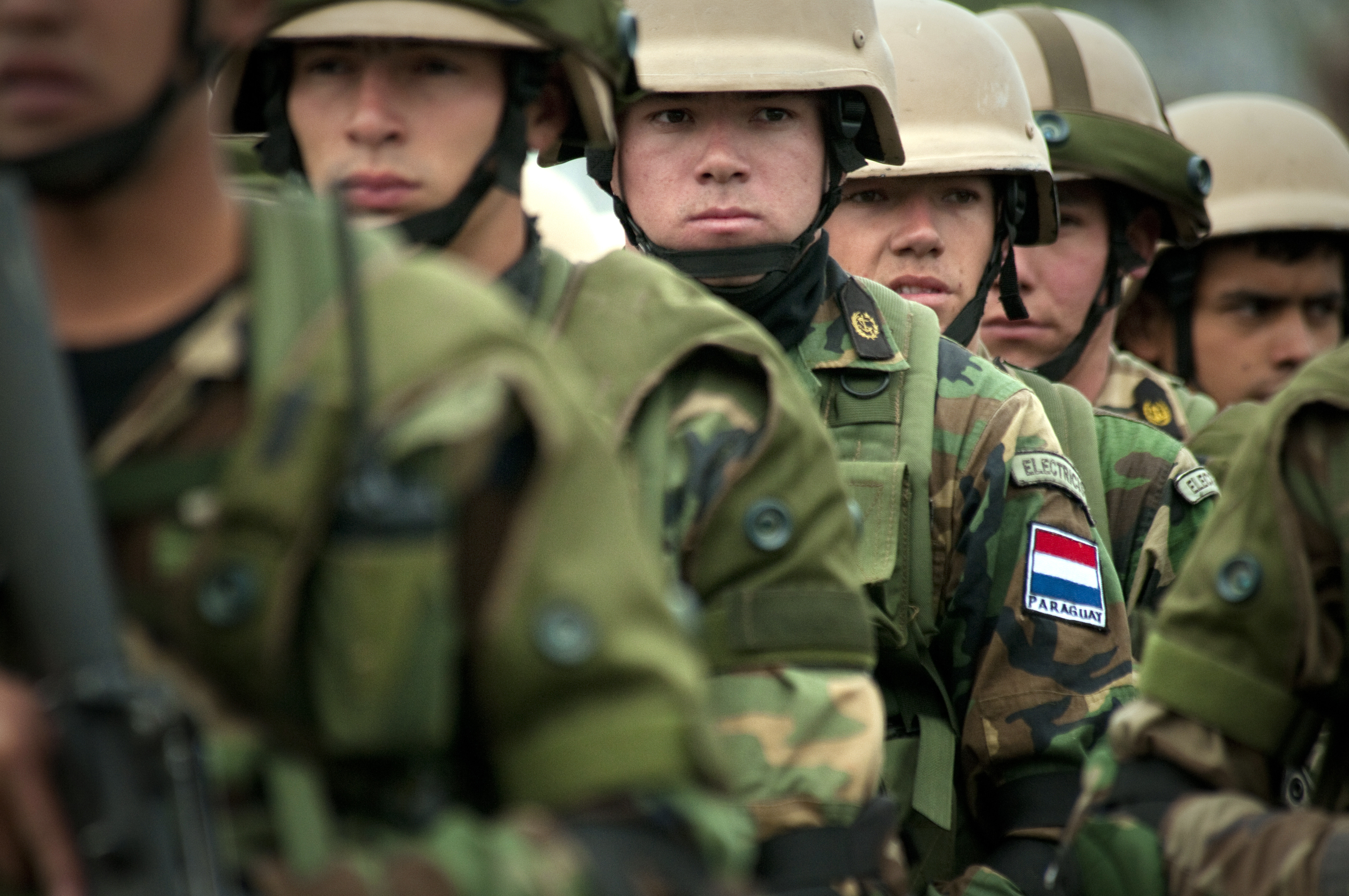
Paraguay naval infantrymen, 2010

- Marine Infantry Command (Comando de Infantería de Marina)
  - 1st Marine Infantry Battalion "Rosario" (Batallón de Infantería de Marina N°1 "Rosario")
  - 2nd Marine Infantry Battalion "Vallemí" (Batallón de Infantería de Marina N°2 "Vallemí")
  - 3rd Marine Infantry Battalion "Asunción" (Batallón de Infantería de Marina N°3 "Asunción")
  - Amphibious Commandos Platoon (Pelotón Comandos Anfibios)
  - Training Group (Agrupación de Instrucción)

== Peru ==
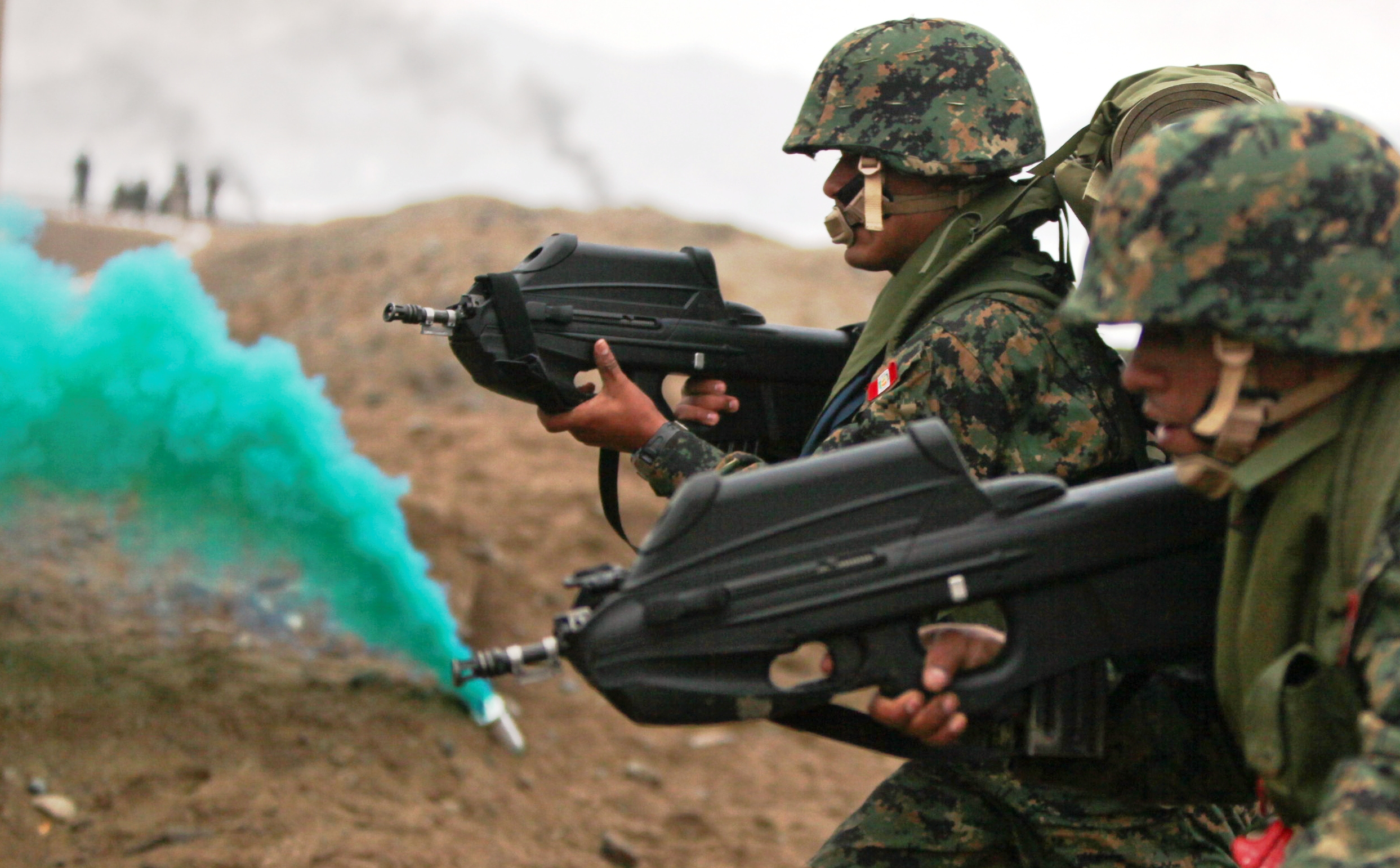
Peruvian naval infantrymen with FN F2000 assault rifles, 2010

- Marine Infantry Force (Fuerza de Infanteria de Marina)
  - Expeditionary Amphibious Brigade (Brigada Expedicionaria Anfibia)
    - 1st Marine Infantry Battalion "Navy Garrison" (Batallón de Infantería de Marina N° 1 "Guarnición de Marina")
    - 2nd Marine Infantry Battalion "Callao Guards" (Batallón de Infantería de Marina N° 2 "Guardia Chalaca")
    - 3rd Marine Infantry Battalion "Winners of Malpelo Point" (Batallón de Infantería de Marina N° 3 "Vencedores de Punta Malpelo")
    - Commando Battalion "1st Lt. Leoncio Prado Gutiérrez" (Batallón de Comandos "Teniente Primero Leoncio Prado Gutiérrez")
    - Artillery Battalion "Captain Juan Guillermo More Ruíz" (Batallón de Artillería "Capitán de Navío Juan Guillermo More Ruíz")
    - Engineers Battalion (Batallón de Ingeniería)
    - Tactical Vehicles Battalion (Batallón de Vehículos Tácticos)
  - Special Operations Force (Fuerza de Operaciones Especiales)
    - Special Operations Group "North" (Grupo de Operaciones Especiales "Norte")
    - Special Operations Group "Center" (Grupo de Operaciones Especiales "Centro")
    - Special Operations Group "North East" (Grupo de Operaciones Especiales "Nor-Oriente")
    - 4th Special Anti-Terrorism Detachment "Zulu" (Destacamento Especial Contraterrorista "Zulu" N° 4)
  - 1st Marine Infantry Amazonia Battalion "Lt.(jg) Raúl Riboty Villalpando" (Batallón de Infantería de Marina de la Amazonía N° 1 "Teniente Segundo Raúl Riboty Villalpando")
  - 2nd Marine Infantry Amazonia Battalion "Lt.Sergio Gonzales Quevedo" (Batallón de Infantería de Marina de la Amazonía N° 2 "Teniente Primero Sergio Gonzales Quevedo")
  - Marine Infantry Company "Captain Juan Fanning García" (Compañía de Infantería de Marina "Capitán de Navío Juan Fanning García")
  - Amphibious Operations International Training Center (Centro de Entrenamiento Internacional de Operaciones Anfibias)

== Philippines ==
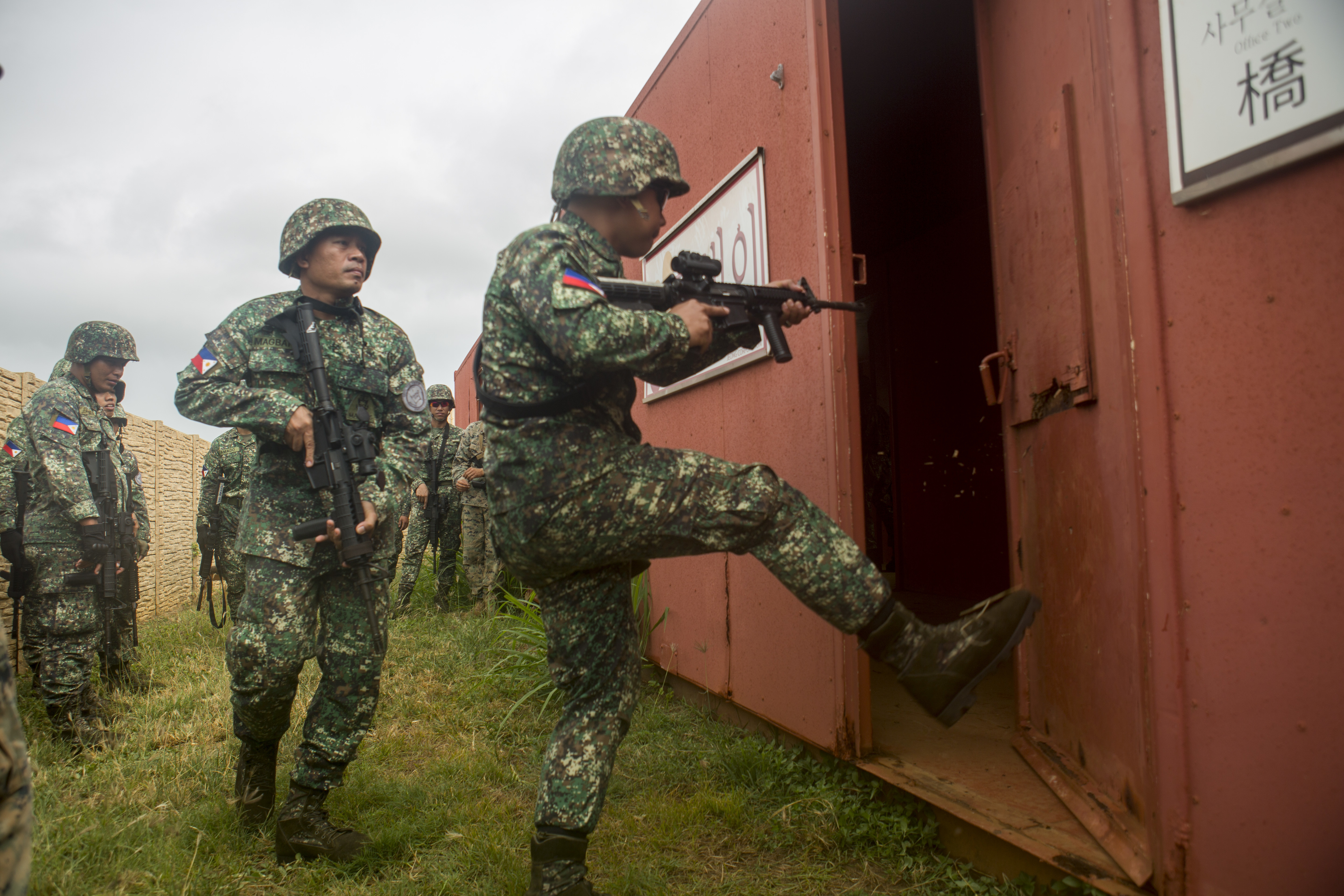
Philippine Marines in training, 2018

- Philippine Marine Corps (Hukbong Kawal Pandagat ng Pilipinas)
  - 1st Marine Brigade
  - 2nd Marine Brigade
  - 3rd Marine Brigade
  - 4th Marine Brigade
    - with the following battalions assigned on rotation:
      - 1st Marine Battalion Landing Team
      - 2nd Marine Battalion Landing Team
      - 3rd Marine Battalion Landing Team
      - 4th Marine Battalion Landing Team
      - 5th Marine Battalion Landing Team
      - 6th Marine Battalion Landing Team
      - 7th Marine Battalion Landing Team
      - 8th Marine Battalion Landing Team
      - 9th Marine Battalion Landing Team
      - 10th Marine Battalion Landing Team
      - 11th Marine Battalion Landing Team
      - 12th Marine Battalion Landing Team
  - 7th Marine Brigade "Shadow Warriors" (Reserve)
    - 71st Marine Infantry Battalion (Reserve)
    - 72nd Marine Infantry Battalion (Reserve)
    - 73rd Marine Infantry Battalion (Reserve)
    - 74th Marine Infantry Battalion (Reserve)
  - 8th Marine Brigade (Reserve)
    - 81st Marine Infantry Battalion (Reserve)
    - 82nd Marine Infantry Battalion (Reserve), including:
      - Disaster Response and Rescue Group
    - 83rd Marine Infantry Battalion (Reserve)
    - 84th Marine Infantry Battalion (Reserve)
  - Combat Service and Support Brigade
    - Field Artillery Battalion
    - Assault Armour Battalion
  - Marine Security and Escort Group
  - Force Reconnaissance Group
  - Marine Corps Training Center
- Navy
  - Naval Special Operations Group

== Portugal ==
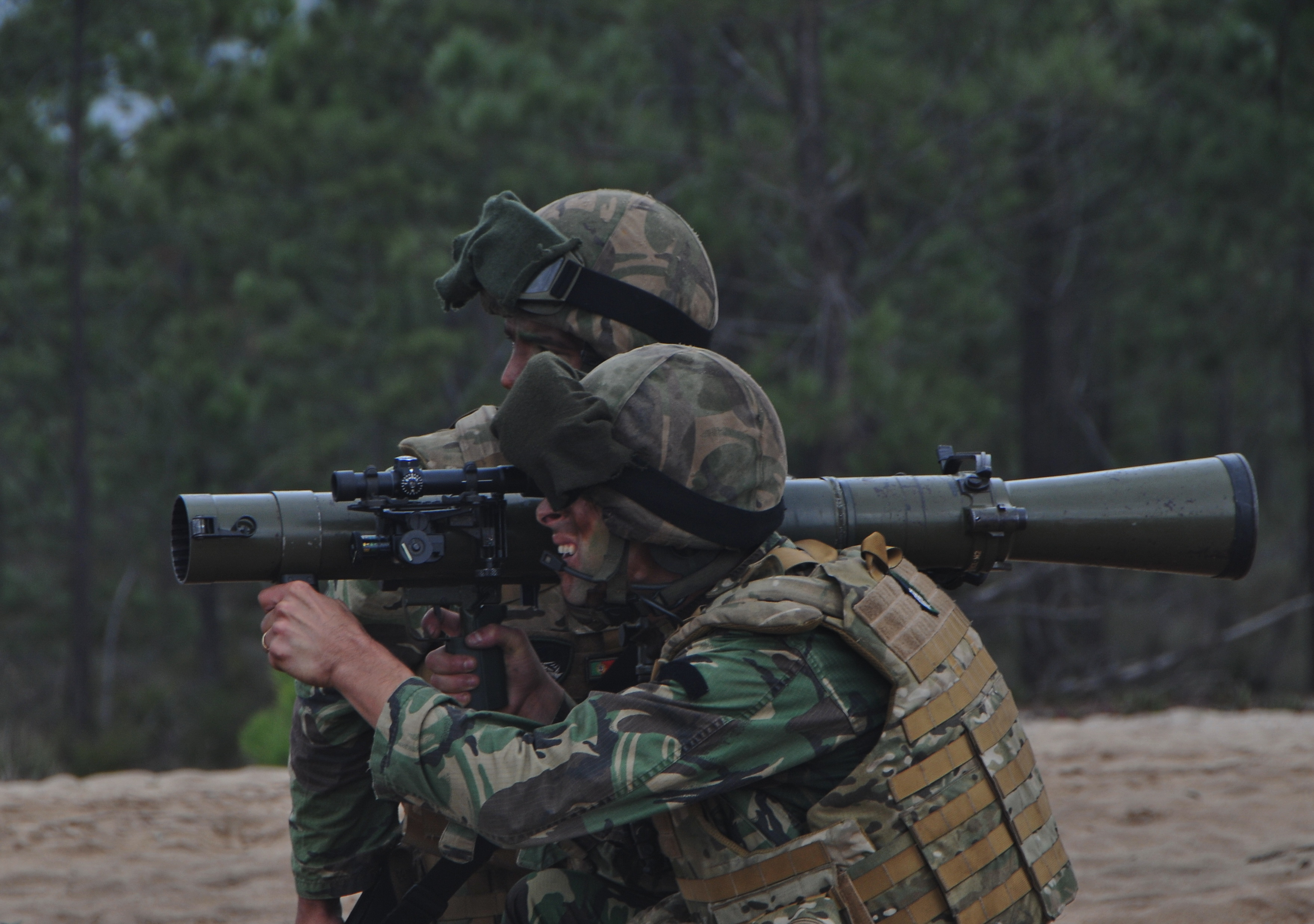
Portuguese naval fusiliers anti-tank team, 2015

- Fusiliers Corps (Corpo de Fuzileiros)
  - 1st Fusiliers Battalion (Batalhão de Fuzileiros Nº1)
  - 2nd Fusiliers Battalion (Batalhão de Fuzileiros Nº2)
  - Special Actions Detachment (Destacamento de Acções Especiais)
  - Fire Support Company (Companhia de Apoio de Fogos)
  - Tactical Transport Support Company (Companhia de Apoio de Transportes Tácticos)
  - Naval Police Unit (Unidade de Policia Naval)
  - Fusiliers School (Escuela de Fuzileiros)

== Romania ==
- 307th Marine Infantry Battalion (Batalionul 307 Infanterie Marină)

== Russia ==
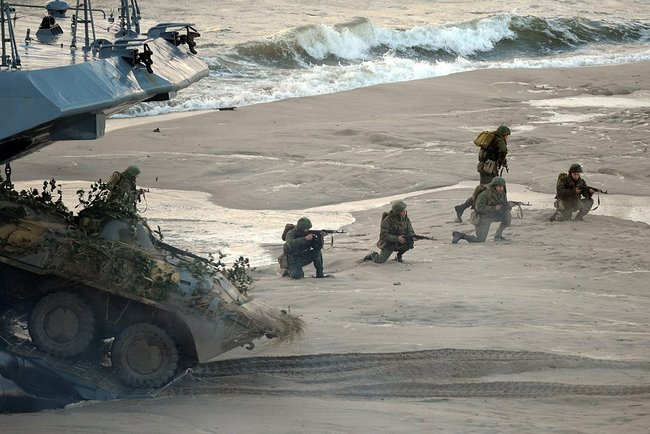
Assault landing training of a Russian mechanized marine infantry unit, 2013

- Marine Infantry (Морская пехота - Morskaya Pekhota)
  - 61st Independent Marine Infantry Brigade "Kirkenes" (61-я отдельная "Киркенесская" бригада морской пехоты - 61-ya Otdel'naya "Kirkenesskaya" Brigada Morskoy Pekhoty)
    - 874th Independent Marine Infantry Battalion (874-й отдельный батальон морской пехоты – 874-y Otdel'nanyy Batal'on Morskoy Pekhoty)
    - 875th Independent Marine Infantry Battalion (875-й отдельный батальон морской пехоты – 875-y Otdel'nyy Batal'on Morskoy Pekhoty)
    - 876th Air Assault Battalion (876-й десантно-штурмовой батальон - 876-y Desantno-Shturmovoy Batal'on)
    - 317th Independent Marine Infantry Battalion (Cadre) (317-я отдельный батальон морской пехоты (Кадр) – 317-y Otdel'nyy Batal'on Morskoy Pekhoty (Cadr))
    - 318th Independent Marine Infantry Battalion (Cadre) (318-й отдельный батальон морской пехоты (кадр) – 318-y Otdel'nyy Batal'on Morskoy Pekhoty (Cadr))
    - 125th Independent Tank Battalion (125-й отдельный танковый батальон - 125 Otdel'nyy Tankovyy Batal'on)
    - 886th Independent Reconnaissance-Raider Battalion (886-й отдельный разведывательно-десантный батальон - 886-y Otdel'nyy Razvedyvatel'no-Desantnyy Batal'on)
    - 1611th Independent Self-propelled Artillery Battalion (1611-й отдельный самоходный артиллерийский дивизион - 1611-y Otdel'nyy Samokhodnyy Artilleriyskiy Divizion)
    - 1591st Independent Self-propelled Artillery Battalion (1591-й отдельный самоходный артиллерийский дивизион - 1591-y Otdel'nyy Samokhodnyy Artilleriyskiy Divizion)
    - 1617th Independent Anti Aircraft Missile Artillery Battalion (1617-й отдельный зенитный ракетно-артиллерийский дивизион - 1617-y Otdel'nyy Zenitnyy Raketno-Artilleriyskiy Divizion)
    - 180th Independent Naval Engineers Battalion (180-й отдельный морской инженерный батальон - 180-y Otdel'nyy Morskoy Inzhenernyy Batal'on)
  - 155th Independent Marine Infantry Brigade "Mozyr" (155-я отдельная "Мозырская" бригада морской пехоты - 155-ya Otdel'naya "Mozyrskaja" Brigada Morskoy Pekhoty
    - 59th Independent Marine Infantry Battalion (59-й отдельный батальон морской пехоты – 59-y Otdel'nyy Batal'on Morskoy Pekhoty)
    - 47th Air Assault Battalion "Ussuri Cossacks" (47-й "Уссурийский казачий" десантно-штурмовой батальон - 47-y "Ussuriyskiy Kazachiy" Desantno-Shturmovoy Batal'on)
    - 287th Independent Self-propelled Artillery Battalion (287-й отдельный самоходный артиллерийский дивизион - 287-y Otdel'nyy Samokhodnyy Artilleriyskiy Divizion)
    - 288th Independent Anti Aircraft Missile Artillery Battalion (288-й отдельный зенитный ракетно-артиллерийский дивизион - 288-y Otdel'nyy Zenitnyy Raketno-Artilleriyskiy Divizion)
    - 1484th Independent Marine Infantry Signal Battalion (1484-й отдельный батальон связи морской пехоты - 1484-y Otdel'nyy Batal'on Svyazi Morskoy Pekhoty)
  - 336th Independent Guards Marine Infantry Brigade "Belostok" (336-я отдельная гвардейская "Белостокская" бригада морской пехоты - 336-ya Otdel'naya Gvardeyskaya "Belostokskaya" Brigada Morskoy Pekhoty)
    - 877th Independent Marine Infantry Battalion (877-й отдельный батальон морской пехоты – 877-y Otdel'nyy Batal'on Morskoy Pekhoty)
    - 878th Independent Marine Infantry Battalion (878-я отдельная батальон морской пехоты – 878-y Otdel'nyy Batal'on Morskoy Pekhoty)
    - 879th Air Assault Battalion (879-й десантно-штурмовой батальон - 879-y Desantno-Shturmovoy Batal'on)
    - 724th Independent Reconnaissance-Raider Battalion (724-й отдельный разведывательно-десантный батальон - 724-y Otdel'nyy Razvedyvatel'no-Desantnyy Batal'on)
    - 1612th Independent Self-propelled Artillery Battalion (1612-й отдельный самоходный артиллерийский дивизион - 1612-y Otdel'nyy Samokhodnyy Artilleriyskiy Divizion)
    - 1592nd Independent Self-propelled Artillery Battalion (1592-й отдельный самоходный артиллерийский дивизион - 1592-y Otdel'nyy Samokhodnyy Artilleriyskiy Divizion)
    - 1618th Independent Anti Aircraft Missile Artillery Battalion (1618-й отдельный зенитный ракетно-артиллерийский дивизион - 1618-y Otdel'nyy Zenitnyy Raketno-Artilleriyskiy Divizion)
    - 127th Independent Marine Engineers Battalion (1127-й отдельный морской инженерный батальон – 127-y otdel'nyy morskoy inzhenernyy batal'on)
  - 810th Independent Guards Marine Infantry Brigade "60th Anniversary of the Formation of the USSR" (810-я отдельная гвардейская бригада морской пехоты имени 60-летия образования СССР - 810-ya Otdel'naya Gvardeyskaya Brigada Morskoy Pekhoty "imeni 60-Letiya Obrazovaniya SSSR")
    - 382nd Independent Marine Infantry Battalion (382-й отдельный батальон морской пехоты – 382-y Otdel'nyy Batal'on Morskoy Pekhoty)
    - 557th Independent Marine Infantry Battalion (557-й отдельный батальон морской пехоты – 557-y Otdel'nyy Batal'on Morskoy Pekhoty)
    - 542nd Air Assault Battalion (881-й десантно-штурмовой батальон - 881-y Desantno-Shturmovoy Batal'on)
    - 546th Independent Self-Propelled Howitzer Artillery Battalion (546-й отдельный гаубичный самоходный артиллерийский дивизион - 546-y Otdel'nyy Gaubichnyy Samokhodnyy Artilleriyskiy Divizion)
    - 547th Independent Anti Aircraft Missile Artillery Battalion (547-й отдельный зенитный ракетно-артиллерийский дивизион - 547-y Otdel'nyy Zenitnyy Raketno-Artilleriyskiy Divizion)
  - 126th Independent Coastal Defense Brigade (126-я отдельная бригада береговой обороны - 126-ya Otdel'naya Brigada Beregovoy Oborony)
    - 501st Independent Marine Infantry Battalion "Feodosia" (501-й отдельный батальон морской пехоты "Феодосия" – 501-y Otdel'nyy Batal'on Morskoy Pekhoty "Feodosia")
  - 3rd Independent "Krasnodar-Harbin" Marine Infantry Regiment (3-й отдельный "Краснодарско-Харбинский" полк морской пехоты - 3-y Otdel'nyy "Krasnodarsko-Kharbinskiy" Polk Morskoy Pekhoty)
    - Independent Marine Infantry Battalion (отдельный батальон морской пехоты – Otdel'nyy Batal'on Morskoy Pekhoty)
    - Independent Air Assault Battalion (отдельный батальон морской пехоты – Otdel'nyy Desantno-Shturmovoy Batal'on)
  - 177th Independent Marine Infantry Regiment (177-й отдельный полк морской пехоты - 177-y Otdel'nyy Polk Morskoy Pekhoty)
    - 414th Independent Marine Infantry Battalion (414-й отдельный батальон морской пехоты - 414-y Otdel'nyy Batal'on Morskoy Pekhoty)
    - 727th Independent Marine Infantry Battalion (727-й отдельный батальон морской пехоты – 727-y Otdel'nyy Batal'on Morskoy Pekhoty)
  - 69th Independent Guard Marine Engineers Regiment "Mogilev" (69-й отдельный гвардейский морской инженерный "Могилевский" полк - 69-y Otdel'nyy Gvardeyskiy Morskoy Inzhenernyy "Mogilevskiy" polk)
  - Marine Infantry Training Center (центр подготовки морской пехоты - Tsentr Podgotovki Morskoy Pekhoty)

== São Tomé and Príncipe ==
- Naval Fusiliers Unit (Unidade de Fuzileiros Navais)

== Saudi Arabia ==
- Marine Corps (مشاة البحرية - Mushat Albahria)
  - 1st Marine Regiment
    - 1st Marine Battalion
    - 2nd Marine Battalion
- Marine Corps School (مدرسة مشاة البحر - Madrasat Mushat Albahr)

== Senegal ==
- Marine Fusilier Commando Company (Compagnie Fusilier Marine Commando)

== Singapore ==
- 1st Battalion, Singapore Guards
- 2nd Battalion, Singapore Guards
- 3rd Battalion, Singapore Guards

== South Africa ==
- Army
  - 9 South African Infantry Battalion
  - 4th Special Forces Regiment including:
    - Special Forces Amphibious and Urban School
- Navy
  - Maritime Reaction Squadron

== South Korea ==
Seal of the Republic of Korea Marine Corps

- Republic of Korea Marine Corps (대한민국 해병대 - Daehanminguk Haebyeongdae)
  - 1st Marine Division "Sea Dragon" (제1해병사단 "해룡" - je1Haebyeongsadan "'Haeryong")
    - 2nd Marine Regiment "Yellow Dragon" (제2해병연대 "황룡" - je2Haebyeong-yeondae "Hwangryong")
      - 21st Airborne Assault Battalion (제21공정대대 - je21Gongjeongdaedaee)
      - 22nd Landing Assault Battalion (제22상륙기습대대 - je22Sanglyuggiseubdaedae)
      - 23rd Guerrilla Warfare Battalion (제23유격대대 - je23Yugyeogdaedae)
    - 3rd Marine Regiment "King Kong" (제3해병연대 "킹콩" - je3Haebyeong-yeondae "KingKong")
      - 31st Airborne Assault Battalion (제31공정대대 - je31Gongjeongdaedaee)
      - 32nd Landing Assault Battalion (제32상륙기습대대 - je32Sanglyuggiseubdaedae)
      - 33rd Guerrilla Warfare Battalion (제33유격대대 - je33Yugyeogdaedae)
    - 7th Marine Regiment "Boar" (제7해병연대 "맷돼지" - je7Haebyeong-yeondae "Maetdwaeji")
      - 71st Guerrilla Warfare Battalion (제71유격대대 - je71Yugyeogdaedae)
      - 72nd Landing Assault Battalion (제72상륙기습대대 - je72Sanglyuggiseubdaedae)
      - 73rd Airborne Assault Battalion (제73공정대대 - je73Gongjeongdaedaee)
    - 1st Artillery Regiment "Phoenix" (제1해병포병연대 "불사조" - je1Haebyeongpobyeong-yeondae "Bulsajo")
      - 2nd Artillery Battalion "Spearhead" (제2해병포병대대 "선봉" - je2Haebyeongpobyeongdaedae "Seonbong ")
      - 3rd Artillery Battalion "Rhinos" (제3해병포병대대 "코뿔소" - je3Haebyeongpobyeongdaedae "Koppulso")
      - 7th Artillery Battalion "Brown Bear" (제2해병포병대대 "불곰 " - je2Haebyeongpobyeongdaedae "Bulgom")
      - 11th Artillery Battalion (제2해병포병대대 - je2Haebyeongpobyeongdaedae)
    - 1st Tank Battalion "White Lion" (제1전차대대 "백사자" - je1Jeonchadaedae "Baegsaja")
    - 1st Assault Amphibious Vehicles Battalion "Crocodile" (제1상륙돌격장갑차대대 "악어" - je1Sanglyugdolgyeogjang-Gabchadaedae "Ageo")
    - 1st Reconnaissance Battalion (제1수색대대 - je1Susaegdaedae)
    - 1st Engineer Battalion "Bull" (제1공병대대 "황소 " - je1Gongbyeongdaedae "Hwangso")
    - 1st Information Communication Battalion "Shark Teeth" (제1정보통신대대 "상어이빨" – je1Jeongbotongsindaedae "Sang-Eoippal" )
    - 1st Support Battalion (제1지원대대 - je1Jiwondaedae)
    - 1st Maintenance Battalion "Skull" (제1정비대대 "적골" – je1Jeongbidaedae "Jeoggol")
    - 1st Supply Transportation Battalion (제1보급수송대대 – je1Bogeubsusongdaedae)
    - Pohang Special Security Area Command (포항특정경비지역사령부 - Pohangteugjeong-gyeongbijiyeogsalyeongbu)
  - 2nd Marine Division (South Korea) (제2해병사단 - je2Haebyeongsadan)
    - 1st Marine Regiment "Vanguard" (제1해병연대 "선봉" - je1Haebyeong-yeondae "Seonbong")
    - 5th Marine Regiment "Rise" (제5해병연대 "상승" - je5Haebyeong-yeondae "Sangseung")
    - 8th Marine Regiment "White Tiger" (제8해병연대 "백호" - je8Haebyeong-yeondae "Baegho")
    - 2nd Artillery Regiment (제2해병포병연대 - je2Haebyeongpobyeong-yeondae)
    - 2nd Tank Battalion (제2전차대대- je2Jeonchadaedae)
    - 2nd Assault Amphibious Vehicles Battalion (제2상륙돌격장갑차대대 - je2Sanglyugdolgyeogjang-Gabchadaedae)
    - 2nd Reconnaissance Battalion (제2수색대대 - je2Susaegdaedae)
    - 2nd Engineer Battalion (제2공병대대- je1Gongbyeongdaedae)
    - 2nd Information Communication Battalion (제2정보통신대대 - je2Jeongbotongsindaedae)
    - 2nd Maintenance Battalion (제2정비대대 – je2Jeongbidaedae)
    - 2nd Supply Transportation Battalion (제2보급수송대대 - je2Bogeubsusongdaedae)
  - 6th Marine Brigade "Black Dragon" (제6해병여단 "흑룡" - je6Haebyeong-yeodan "Heuglyong")
    - 61st Battalion (제61공정대대 - je61Gongjeongdaedae)
    - 62nd Battalion (제62 공정대대 - je62Gongjeongdaedae)
    - 63rd Battalion (제63공정대대 - je63Gongjeongdaedae)
    - 65th Battalion (제65공정대대 - je65Gongjeongdaedae)
  - 9th Marine Brigade "White Dragon" (제9해병여단 "백룡" - je9Haebyeong-yeodan "Baeglyong")
    - 91st Battalion (제91공정대대 - je91Gongjeongdaedae)
    - 92nd Battalion (제92 공정대대 - je92Gongjeongdaedae)
    - 93rd Battalion (제93공정대대 - je93Gongjeongdaedae)
  - Yeonpyeongdo Garrison "Dinosaur" (연평부대 "공룡" - Yeonpyeongbudae "Gonglyong")
    - 90th Battalion (제90공정대대 - je90Gongjeongdaedae)

== Spain ==
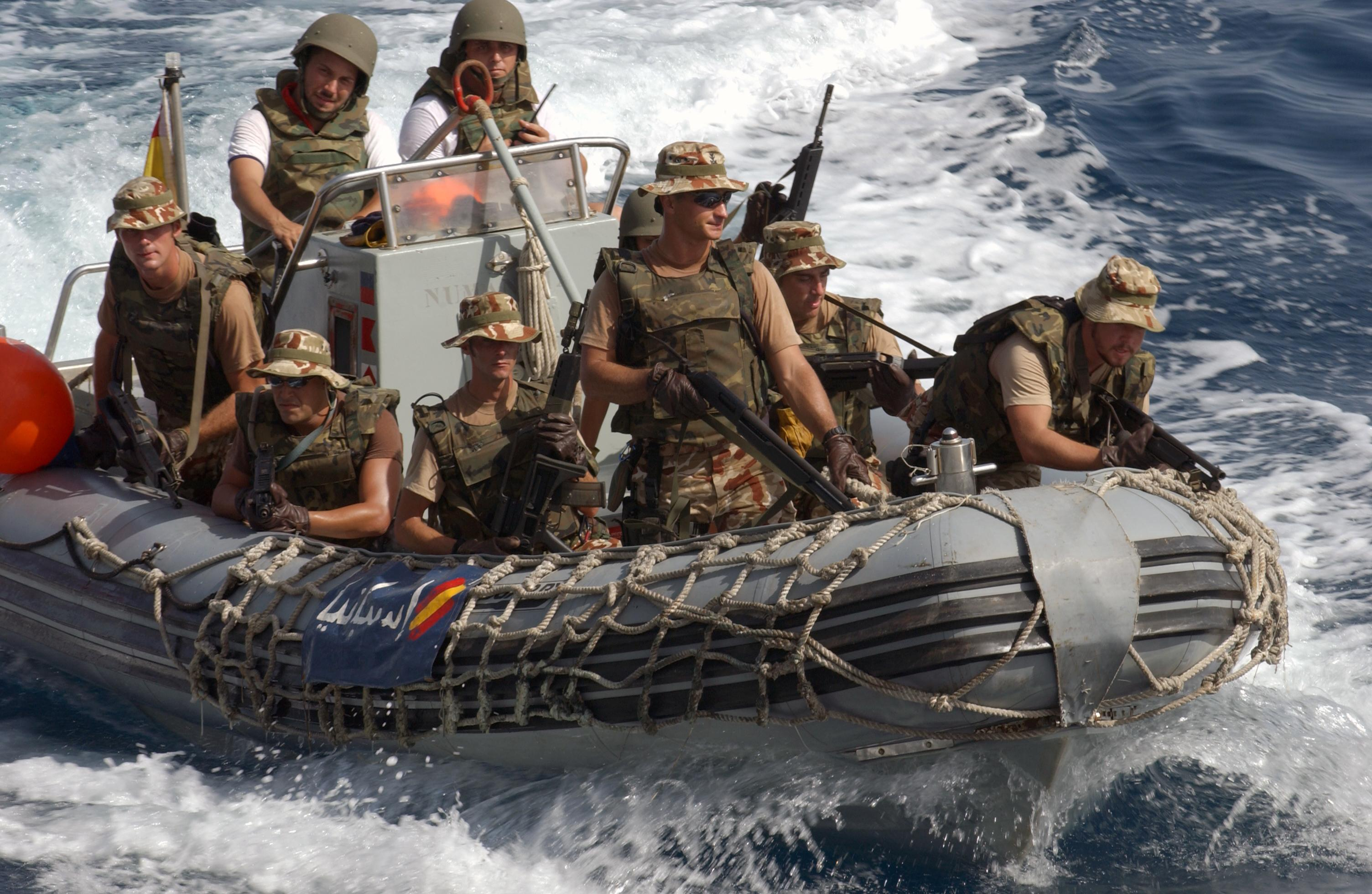
Spanish Marine Infantry boarding team, 2004

- Marine Infantry Force (Fuerza de Infantería de Marina)
  - "Ocean Sea" Company of His Majesty the King's Royal Guard Regiment (Compañía "Mar Océano" del Regimiento de la Guardia Real de Su Majestad el Rey)
  - Fleet Regiment (Tercio de Armada)
    - Marine Infantry Brigade (Brigada de Infantería de Marina)
      - Headquarters Battalion (Batallón de Cuartel General)
      - 1st Landing Battalion (I Batallón de Desembarco)
      - 2nd Landing Battalion (II Batallón de Desembarco)
      - 3rd Mechanized Landing Battalion (III Batallón Mecanizado de Desembarco)
      - Landing Artillery Battalion (Grupo de Artillería de Desembarco)
      - Combat Support Services Group (Grupo de Apoyo de Servicios de Combate)
      - Reconnaissance Unit (Unidad de Reconocimiento)
      - Amphibious Mobility Group (Grupo de Movilidad Anfibia)
    - Base Unit (Unidad de Base)
  - Protection Force (Fuerza de Protección)
    - Northern Regiment (Tercio del Norte)
    - Southern Regiment (Tercio del Sur)
    - Eastern Regiment (Tercio de Levante)
    - Madrid Group (Agrupación de Madrid)
    - Canary Island Security Unit (Unidad de Seguridad de Canarias)
  - Special Naval War Force (Fuerza de Guerra Naval Especial)
  - Marine Infantry School "General Albacete y Fuster" (Escuela de Infantería de Marina "General Albacete y Fuster")

== Sri Lanka ==
- Sri Lanka Marine Corps (ශ්‍රී ලංකා මැරීන් බලකාය - Śrī Laṁkā Mærīn Baḷakāya)

== Sudan ==
- 101st Marine Division "Port Sudan"

== Sweden ==
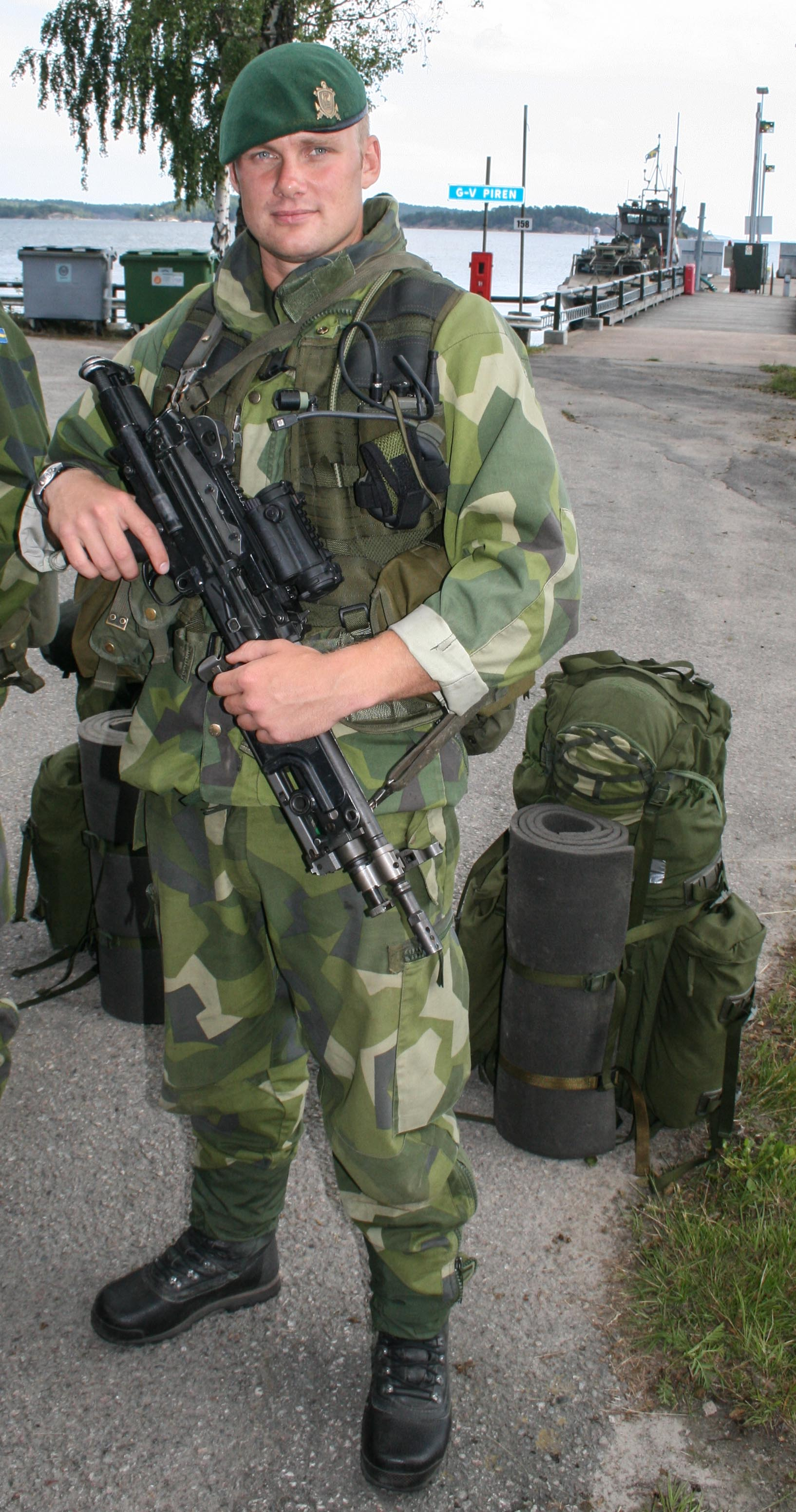
Swedish Marine in 2009

- Amphibious Corps (Amfibiekåren)
  - 1st Marine Regiment (Amfibieregementet)
    - 2nd Amphibious Battalion (2. amfibiebataljonen)
    - 28th Home Guard Battalion (28. hemvärnsbataljonen)
    - 29th Home Guard Battalion (29. hemvärnsbataljonen)
    - 32nd Home Guard Battalion (32. hemvärnsbataljonen)
  - 17th Amphibious Patrol Boat Company (17. amfibiebevakningsbåtskompaniet)
  - 132nd Naval Security Company (132. säkerhetskompani sjö)

== Tanzania ==
- two Marine companies

== Thailand ==
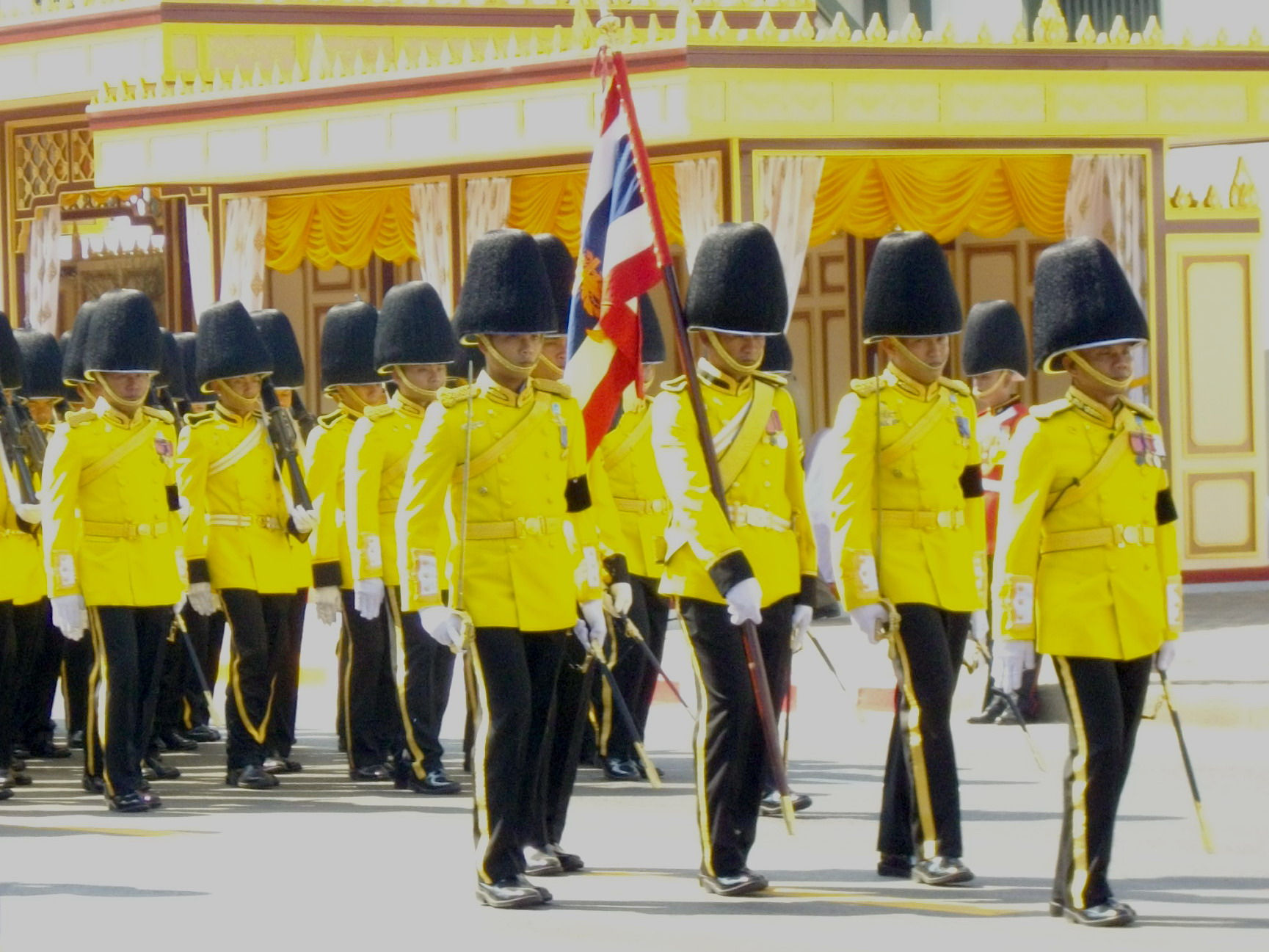
Thai Marines of the Royal Guard in ceremonial uniform (1st Royal Guards Marine Infantry Battalion)

- Royal Marines (ราชนาวิกโยธิน - Rāch Nāwikyoṭhin)
  - Marine Division (กองพลนาวิกโยธิน - Kxngphl Nāwikyoṭhin)
    - 1st Marines Infantry Regiment (กรมทหารราบที่ 1 นาวิกโยธิน - Krm thh̄ār rāb thī̀ 1 nāwikyoṭhin)
      - 1st Royal Guards Marine Infantry Battalion (กองพันทหารราบที่ 1 รักษาพระองค์ฯ - Kxngphạn thh̄ār rāb thī̀ 1 rạks̄ʹā phra xngkh̒)
      - 2nd Marine Infantry Battalion (กองพันทหารราบที่ 2 นาวิกโยธิน - Kxngphạn thh̄ār Rāb Thī̀ 2 Nāwikyoṭhin)
      - 3rd Marine Infantry Battalion (กองพันทหารราบที่ 3 นาวิกโยธิน - Kxngphạn thh̄ār Rāb Thī̀ 3 Nāwikyoṭhin)
    - 2nd Marine Infantry Regiment (กรมทหารราบที่ 2 นาวิกโยธิน - Krm thh̄ār rāb thī̀ 2 nāwikyoṭhin)
      - 4th Marine Infantry Battalion (กองพันทหารราบที่ 4 นาวิกโยธิน - Kxngphạn thh̄ār Rāb Thī̀ 4 Nāwikyoṭhin)
      - 5th Marine Infantry Battalion (กองพันทหารราบที่ 5 นาวิกโยธิน - Kxngphạn thh̄ār Rāb Thī̀ 5 Nāwikyoṭhin)
      - 6th Marine Infantry Battalion (กองพันทหารราบที่ 6 นาวิกโยธิน - Kxngphạn thh̄ār Rāb Thī̀ 6 Nāwikyoṭhin)
    - 3rd Marine Infantry Regiment (กรมทหารราบที่ 3 นาวิกโยธิน - Krm thh̄ār rāb thī̀ 3 nāwikyoṭhin)
      - 7th Marine Infantry Battalion (กองพันทหารราบที่ 7 นาวิกโยธิน - Kxngphạn thh̄ār Rāb Thī̀ 7 Nāwikyoṭhin)
      - 8th Marine Infantry Battalion (กองพันทหารราบที่ 8 นาวิกโยธิน - Kxngphạn thh̄ār Rāb Thī̀ 8 Nāwikyoṭhin)
      - 9th Royal Guards Marine Infantry Battalion (กองพันทหารราบที่ 9 รักษาพระองค์ฯ - Kxngphạn thh̄ār rāb thī̀ 9 rạks̄ʹā phra xngkh̒)
    - Marines Artillery Regiment (กรมทหารปืนใหญ่ นาวิกโยธิน - Krm thh̄ār pụ̄n h̄ıỵ̀ nāwikyoṭhin)
      - 1st Marine Light Artillery Battalion (กองพันทหารปืนใหญ่เบา 1 นาวิกโยธิน - Kxngphạn Thh̄ār Pụ̄n h̄ıỵ̀ Beā 1 Nāwikyoṭhin)
      - 2nd Marine Light Artillery Battalion (กองพันทหารปืนใหญ่เบา 2 นาวิกโยธิน - Kxngphạn Thh̄ār Pụ̄n h̄ıỵ̀ Beā 2 Nāwikyoṭhin)
      - 3rd Marine Air Defence Artillery Battalion (กองพันทหารปืนใหญ่ต่อสู้อากาศยาน 3 นาวิกโยธิน - Kxngphạn Thh̄ār Pụ̄n h̄ıỵ̀ t̀xs̄ū̂ Xākāṣ̄yān 3 Nāwikyoṭhin)
      - 4th Marine Light Artillery Battalion (กองพันทหารปืนใหญ่เบา 4 นาวิกโยธิน - Kxngphạn Thh̄ār Pụ̄n h̄ıỵ̀ Beā 4 Nāwikyoṭhin)
    - Marine Service Support Regiment (กรมสนับสนุน กองพลนาวิกโยธิน - krm s̄nạbs̄nun Kxngphl Nāwikyoṭhin)
      - Medical Battalion (กองพันพยาบาล - Kxngphạn Phyābāl)
      - Maintenance Battalion (กองพันซ่อมบำรุง - Kxngphạn s̀xm bảrung)
      - Motor Transport Battalion (กองพันทหารขนส่ง - kxngphạn thh̄ār k̄hns̄̀ng)
    - Marine Amphibious Assault Vehicle Battalion (กองพันรถสะเทินน้ำสะเทินบก กองพลนาวิกโยธิน - Kxngphạn rt̄h s̄atheinn̂ảs̄atheinbk Kxngphl Nāwikyoṭhin)
    - Marine Force Reconnaissance Battalion (กองพันลาดตระเวน กองพลนาวิกโยธิน - Kxngphạn Lādtrawen Kxngphl Nāwikyoṭhin)
    - Marine Tank Battalion (กองพันรถถัง กองพลนาวิกโยธิน - kxngphạn rt̄h t̄hạng kxngphl nāwikyoṭhin)
    - Marine Combat Engineers Battalion (กองพันทหารช่าง กองพลนาวิกโยธิน - kxngphạn thh̄ār ch̀āng kxngphl nāwikyoṭhin)
    - Marine Signal Battalion (กองพันทหารสื่อสาร กองพลนาวิกโยธิน - kxngphạn thh̄ār s̄ụ̄̀xs̄ār kxngphl nāwikyoṭhin)
    - Marine Security Regiment (กรมรักษาความปลอดภัย หน่วยบัญชาการนาวิกโยธิน - Krm rạks̄ʹā khwām plxdp̣hạy h̄ǹwy bạỵchākār nāwikyoṭhin)
    - 61st Marine Special Operation Center (ศูนย์ปฏิบัติการพิเศษที่ 61นาวิกโยธิน - Ṣ̄ūny̒ pt̩ibạtikār phiṣ̄es̄ʹ thī̀ 61nāwikyoṭhin)
    - 411th Marine Special Task Force (หน่วยเฉพาะกิจนาวิกโยธิน 411 - H̄ǹwy c̄hephāakic nāwikyoṭhin 411)

== Timor-Leste ==
- Naval Fusiliers (Fuzileirus Navál)

== Togo ==
- Marine Fusiliers Company (Compagnie de Fusiliers Marins)

== Tonga ==
- Marine Infantry battalion

== Tunisia ==
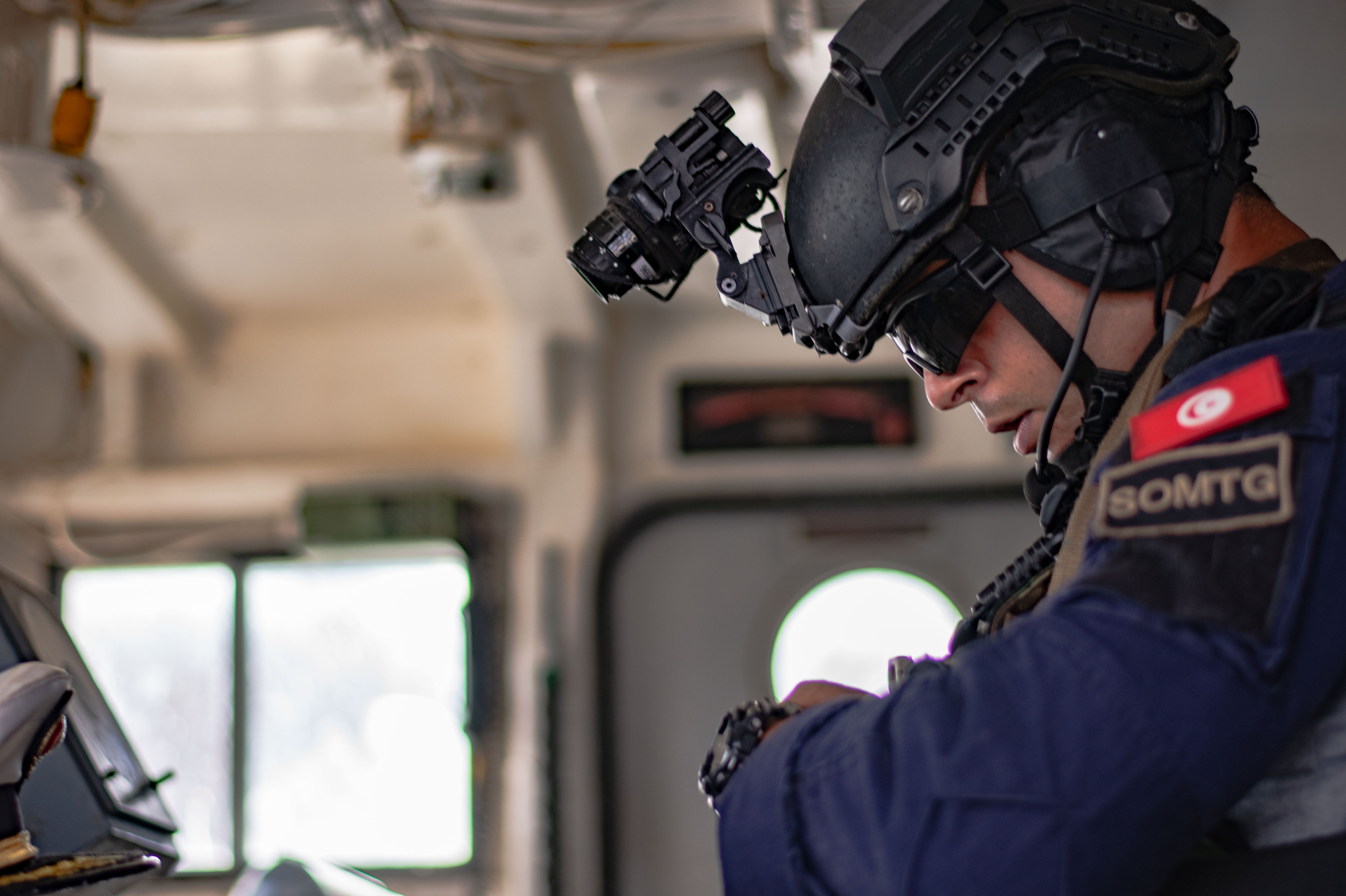
Tunisian marine commando, 2024

- 51st marine commandos regiment
- 52nd marine commandos regiment

== Turkey ==
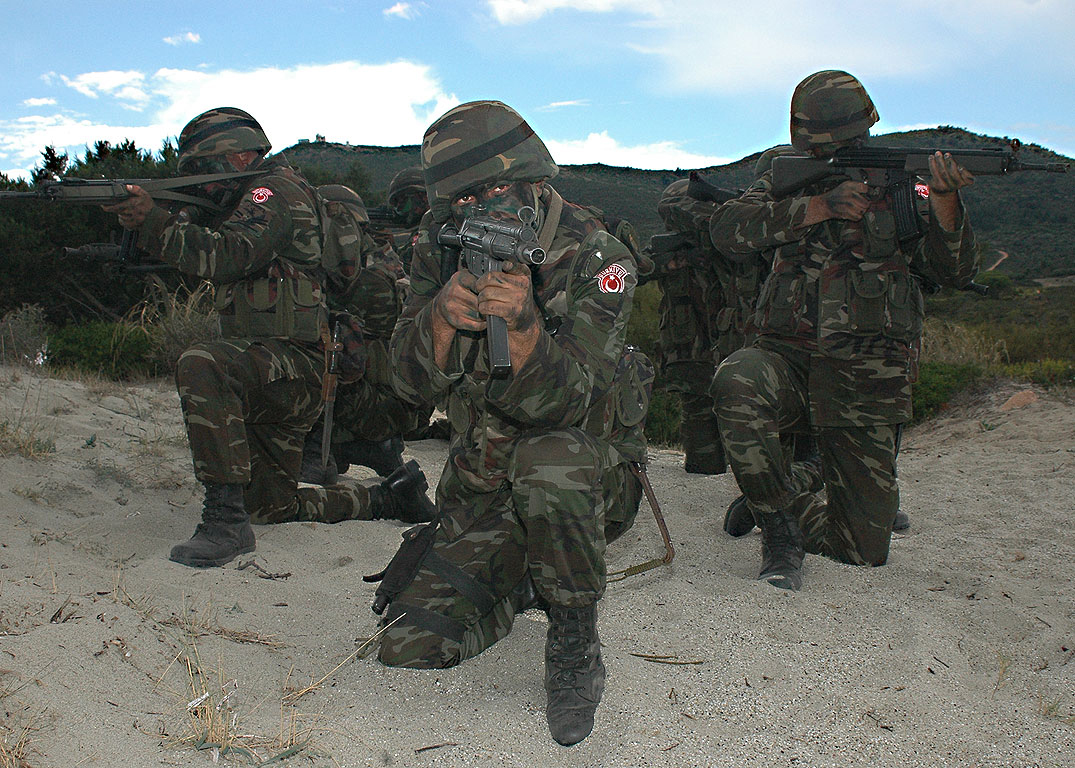
Turkish Marines in training, 2009

- Amphibious Marine Infantry Brigade (Amfibi Deniz Piyade Tugay)
  - 1st Amphibious Marine Infantry Battalion (1.Amfibi Deniz Piyade Taburu)
  - 2nd Amphibious Marine Infantry Battalion (2.Amfibi Deniz Piyade Taburu)
  - 3rd Amphibious Marine Infantry Battalion (3.Amfibi Deniz Piyade Taburu)
  - Amphibious Support Battalion (Amfibi Destek Taburu)
  - Services Company (Servis Bölüğü)

== Uganda ==
- 10th Marine Battalion

== Ukraine ==
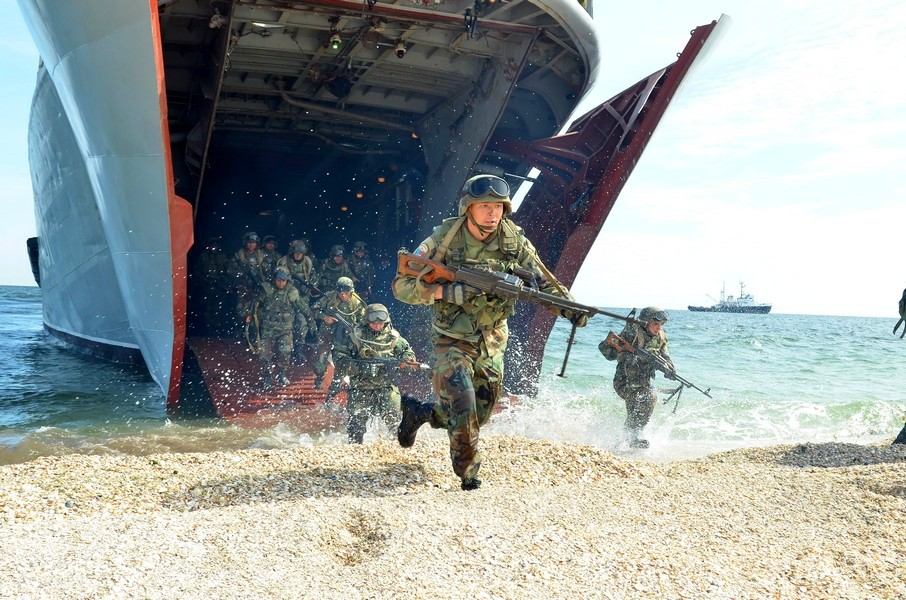
Ukrainian marine infantry assault landing training, 2015

- Ukrainian Marine Corps (Корпус Морської піхоти - Korpuys Mors'koyi pikhoty)
  - 35th Independent Marine Infantry Brigade (35-та окрема бригада морської піхоти - 35-ta Okrema Bryhada Mors'koyi pikhoty)
    - 18th Independent Marine Battalion (18-й окремий батальйон морської піхоти - 18-y Okremyi batal'yon Mors'koyi pikhoty)
    - 136h Independent Marine Battalion (136-й окремий батальйон морської піхоти - 136-y Okremyi batal'yon Mors'koyi pikhoty)
    - 137th Independent Marine Battalion (137-й окремий батальйон морської піхоти - 137-y Okremyy batal'yon Mors'koyi pikhoty)
    - 88th Independent Marine Infantry Air Assault Battalion (88-й Окремий десантно-штурмовий батальйон Морської піхоти - 88-y Okremyi desantno-shturmovyy batalʹyon Morsʹkoyi pikhoty)
  - 36th Marine Brigade (Independent) (36-та окрема бригада Морської піхоти - 36-ta Okrema bryhada Mors'koyi pikhoty)
    - 1st Independent Marine Battalion (1-й окремий батальйон морської піхоти - 1-y Okremyi batal'yon Mors'koyi pikhoty)
    - 501st Independent Marine Battalion (501-й окремий батальйон морської піхоти- 501-y Okremyi batal'yon Mors'koyi pikhoty)
    - 503rd Independent Marine Battalion (503-й окремий батальйон морської піхоти- 503-y Okremyi batal'yon Mors'koyi pikhoty)
    - 36th Independent Marine Infantry Air Assault Battalion (36-й окремий десантно-штурмовий батальйон морської піхоти - 36-y Okremyi desantno-shturmovyi Batal'yon Mors'koyi pikhoty)
    - Brigade Artillery Group (бригадна артилерійська група - Bryhadna Artyleriys'ka Hrupa)
    - Anti-Aircraft Missile Artillery Battalion (зенітний ракетно-артилерійський дивізіон - Zenitnyi Raketno-Artyleryis'kyi dyvizion)
    - Repair and Maintenance Battalion (ремонтно-відновлювальний батальйон - Remontno-vidnovlyuval'nyi Batal'yon)
    - Engineering Operations Battalion (група інженерного забезпечення - Hrupa Inzhenernoho Zabezpechennya)
  - 140th Independent Intelligence Battalion (140-й окремий розвідувальний батальйон - 140-y Okremyy rozviduval'nyi batal'yon)
  - 406th Independent Marine Artillery Brigade "Brigadier Oleksa Almaziv" (406-та окрема артилерійська бригада "імені генерал-хорунжого Олексія Алмазова" - 406-ta Okrema Artyleryis'ka Bryhada "imeni Heneral-khorunzhoho Oleksiya Almazova")

== United Arab Emirates ==
- Marines Battalion

== United Kingdom ==
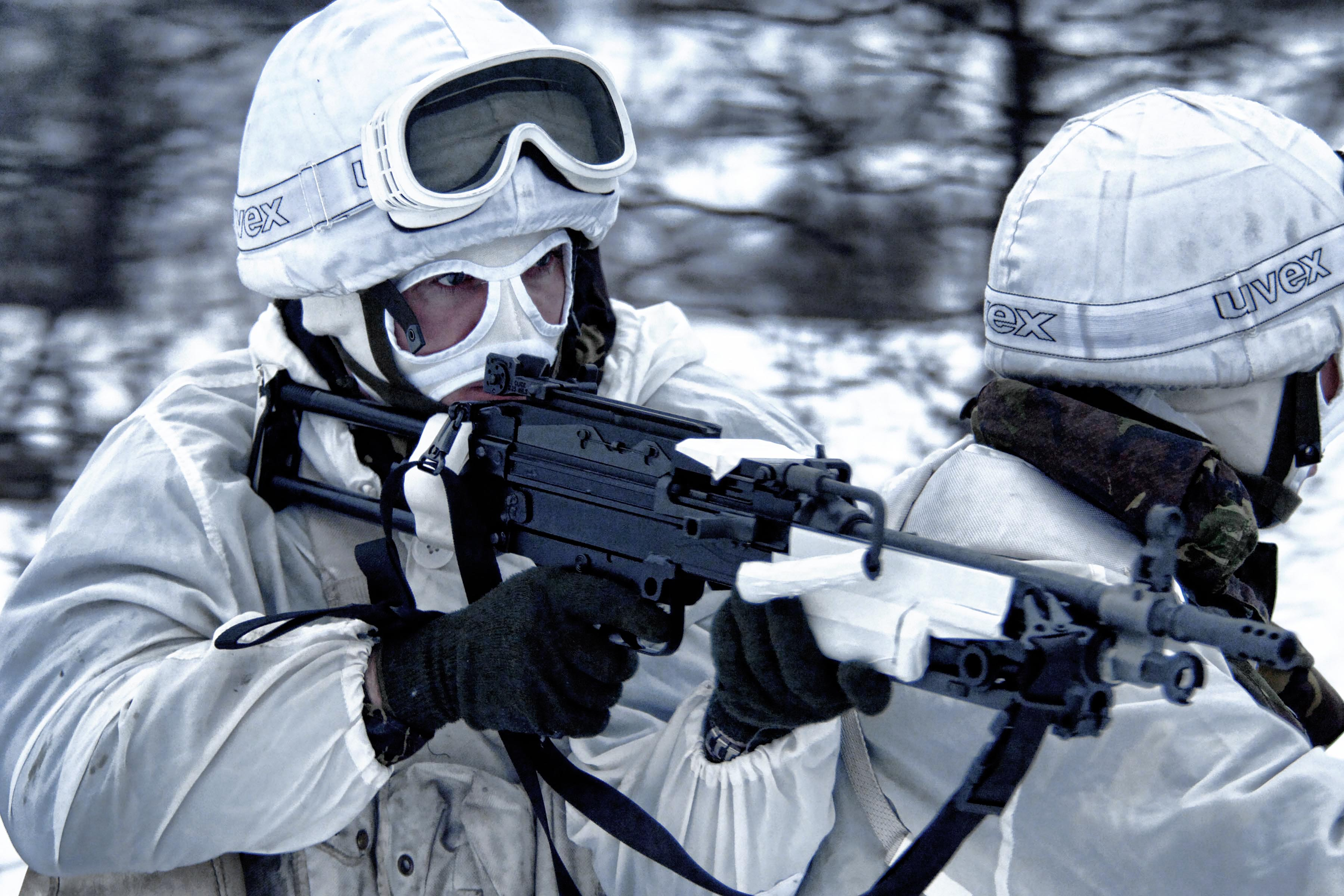
British Royal Marines winter training in Norway, 2006

- Royal Marines
  - 3 Commando Brigade
    - 30 Commando Information Exploitation Group
    - 40 Commando
    - 42 Commando
    - 43 Commando Fleet Protection Group
    - 45 Commando
    - 47 Commando (Raiding Group)
      - 4th Assault Squadron (Note: Permanently assigned to HMS Albion.)
      - 6th Assault Squadron (Note: Permanently assigned to HMS Bulwark.)
      - 11th Amphibious Test and Trials Squadron
      - 12th Landing Crafts Training Squadron
      - 539 Raiding Squadron
    - Commando Logistic Regiment, including:
      - Armoured Support Group Royal Marines
    - Attached British Army units:
      - 24 Commando Royal Engineers
      - 29th Commando Regiment Royal Artillery
      - 131 Independent Commando Squadron Royal Engineers
      - 383 Commando Petroleum Troop Royal Logistic Corps
      - Commando Troop, 821 Explosive Ordnance Disposal & Search Squadron, Royal Logistic Corps
  - Royal Marines Reserve
    - Royal Marine Reserve Bristol
    - Royal Marine Reserve City of London
    - Royal Marine Reserve Merseyside
    - Royal Marine Reserve Scotland, including:
      - Amphibious Raiding Craft Section
  - Special Boat Service, including:
    - Special Boat Service (Reserve)
    - Special Boat Service Signal Squadron
  - Commando Training Centre Royal Marines
  - Royal Marines Vanguard Strike Company (Note: Experimental unit. Mixed Royal Marines and British Army personnel.)

== United States ==
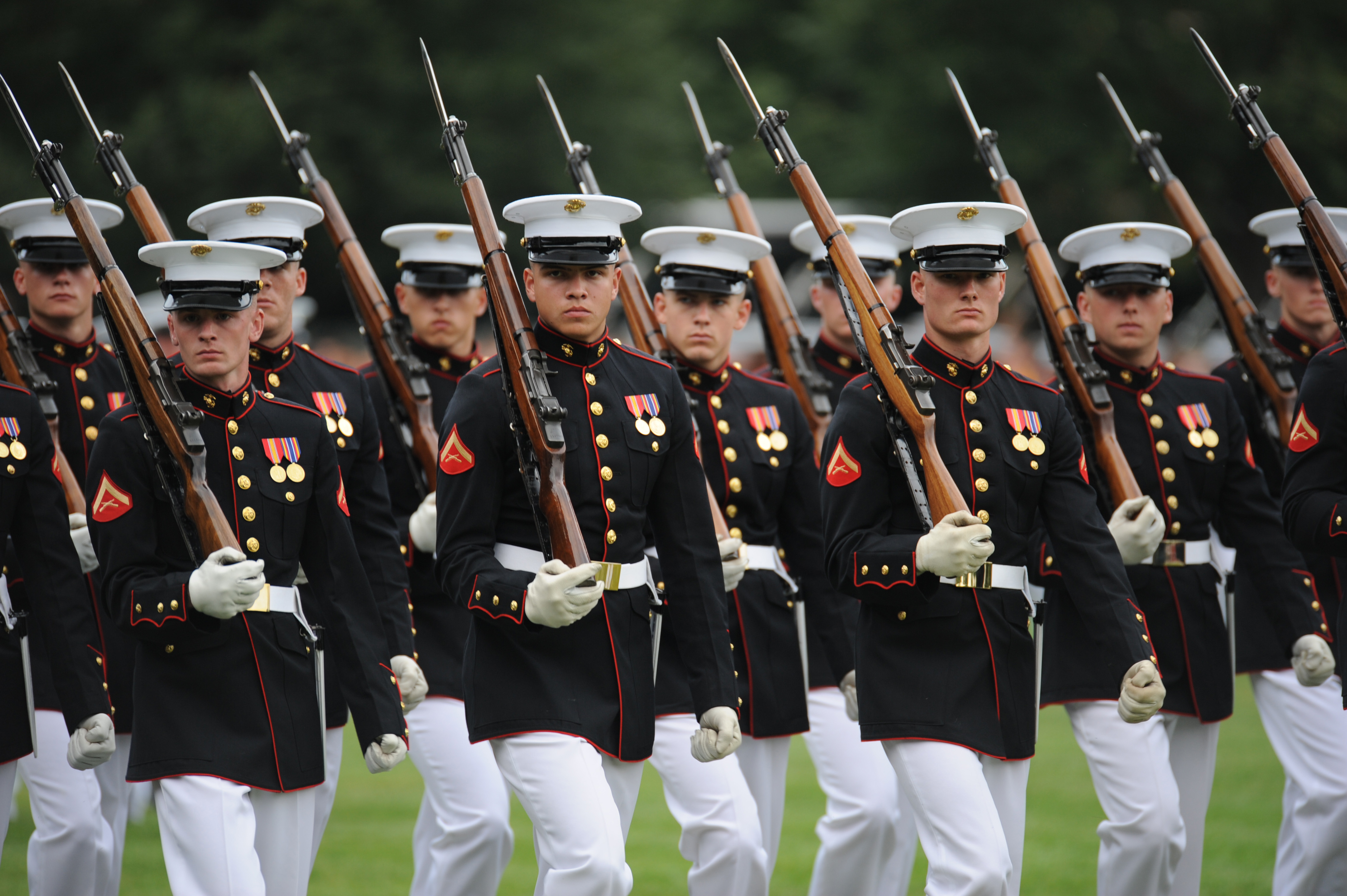
US Marines on parade, 2010

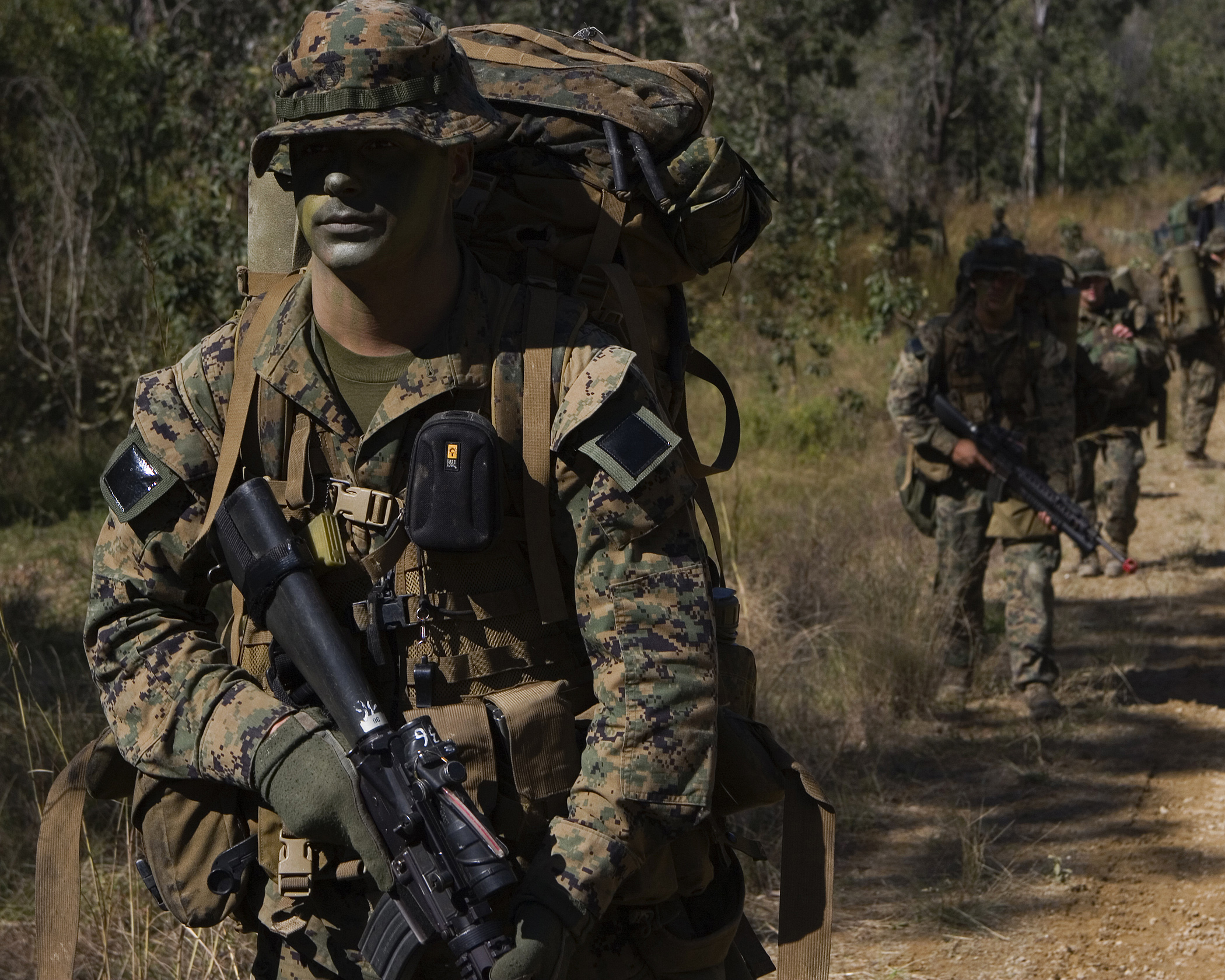
US Marines in training, 2007

- United States Marine Corps
- 1st Marine Division
  - Headquarters Battalion "Standard Bearers"
  - 1st Marine Regiment
    - 1st Battalion/1st Marine Regiment "First of the First" (Note: The unit is reorganizing as a test battalion under the new Infantry Battalion Experiment Campaign Plan (IBX30). See "The Marine Corps Is Redesigning Infantry Battalions for the Future". mdefenseone.com. 23 June 2021.)
    - 2nd Battalion/1st Marine Regiment "The Professionals"
    - 3rd Battalion/1st Marine Regiment "Thundering Third"
    - 1st Battalion/4th Marine Regiment "The China Marines"
  - 5th Marine Regiment
    - 1st Battalion/5th Marine Regiment "Geronimo"
    - 2nd Battalion/5th Marine Regiment "Marauders"
    - 3rd Battalion/5th Marine Regiment "Darkhorse"
    - 2nd Battalion/4th Marine Regiment "Magnificent Bastards"
  - 7th Marine Regiment
    - 1st Battalion/7th Marine Regiment "First Team"
    - 2nd Battalion/7th Marine Regiment "War Dogs"
    - 3rd Battalion/7th Marine Regiment "The Cutting Edge"
    - 3rd Battalion/4th Marine Regiment "Darkside"
  - 11th Marine Regiment (Artillery)
    - 1st Battalion/11th Marine Regiment "Cobra"
    - 2nd Battalion/11th Marine Regiment "Patriot"
    - 3rd Battalion/11th Marine Regiment "Thunder"
    - 5th Battalion/11th Marine Regiment "Steel Rain"
  - 3rd Assault Amphibian Battalion "3rd Tracks"
  - 1st Combat Engineer Battalion "The Super Breed"
  - 1st Reconnaissance Battalion "Swift Silent Deadly"
  - 1st Light Armored Reconnaissance Battalion "Highlanders"
  - 3rd Light Armored Reconnaissance Battalion "Wolfpack"
  - 1st Marine Logistic Group
    - Combat Logistics Regiment 1
      - 1st Transportation Support Battalion
      - Combat Logistics Battalion 1
      - Combat Logistics Battalion 5
      - Combat Logistics Battalion 7
    - Combat Logistics Regiment 17
      - Combat Logistics Battalion 11
      - Combat Logistics Battalion 13 "Lucky"
      - Combat Logistics Battalion 15 "Blackout"
    - 1st Supply Battalion "Dragon Warriors"
    - 1st Maintenance Battalion "Midas"
  - 9th Communications Battalion
  - 1st Intelligence Battalion
  - 1st Law Enforcement Battalion (Note: To be deactivated. See Megan Eckstein (23 March 2020). "New Marine Corps Cuts Will Slash all Tanks Many Heavy Weapons as Focus Shifts to Lighter Littoral Forces". news.usni.org.)
  - 1st Radio Battalion
  - 1st Civilian Affairs Group
  - 3rd Low-Altitude Air Defense Battalion
- 2nd Marine Division
  - Headquarters Battalion "The Silent Second"
  - 2nd Marine Regiment
    - 1st Battalion/2nd Marine Regiment "Timberwolf"
    - 2nd Battalion/2nd Marine Regiment "Warlords"
    - 3rd Battalion/2nd Marine Regiment "Betio Bastards"
    - 2nd Battalion/8th Marine Regiment "America's Battalion"
  - 6th Marine Regiment
    - 1st Battalion/6th Marine Regiment "1/6 HARD"
    - 2nd Battalion/6th Marine Regiment "The Ready Battalion"
    - 3rd Battalion/6th Marine Regiment "Teufelhunden"
    - 1st Battalion/8th Marine Regiment "The Beirut Battalion"
  - 10th Marine Regiment (Artillery)
    - 1st Battalion/10th Marine Regiment "Nightmare"
    - 2nd Battalion/10th Marine Regiment "Gunslinger"
  - 2nd Reconnaissance Battalion
  - 2nd Light Armored Reconnaissance Battalion "Destroyers"
  - 2nd Combat Engineer Battalion "That Other Battalion"
  - 2nd Assault Amphibian Battalion "The First Wave"
  - 2nd Marine Logistic Group
    - Combat Logistics Regiment 2
      - 2nd Transportation Support Battalion
      - Combat Logistics Battalion 2
      - Combat Logistics Battalion 6
      - Combat Logistics Battalion 8
    - Combat Logistics Regiment 27
      - Combat Logistics Battalion 22
      - Combat Logistics Battalion 24
      - Combat Logistics Battalion 26
    - 2nd Maintenance Battalion "Sustinare Bellatore"
    - 2nd Supply Battalion
    - 8th Engineer Support Battalion
  - 8th Communications Battalion
  - 2nd Intelligence Battalion
  - 2nd Radio Battalion
  - 2nd Civilian Affairs Group
  - 2nd Low-Altitude Air Defense Battalion
- 3rd Marine Division
  - Headquarters Battalion "Samurai"
  - 3rd Marine Regiment (Note: Scheduled to be reorganized as a Marine Littoral Regiment. See "New U.S. Marine Corps Force Design Initiatives" (PDF). everycrsreport.com. 2 March 2021.)
    - 1st Battalion/3rd Marine Regiment "Lava Dogs"
    - 2nd Battalion/3rd Marine Regiment "Island Warriors"
    - 3rd Battalion/3rd Marine Regiment "America's Battalion"
  - 4th Marine Regiment (Note: Currently all its battalion are detached, assigned as reinforcements to the 1st Marine Division. The Regimental HQ act as a holding command for the USMC battalions serving their rotation six months forward deployment in Okinawa under the Unit Deployment Program.)
  - 12th Marine Regiment (Artillery)
    - 1st Battalion/12th Marine Regiment "Spartans"
    - 3rd Battalion/12th Marine Regiment "Warriors of the Pacific"
  - 3rd Reconnaissance Battalion "Mortalis"
  - Jungle Warfare Training Center
  - 3rd Marine Logistic Group
    - Combat Logistics Regiment 3
      - 3rd Transportation Support Battalion
      - Combat Logistics Battalion 3
      - Combat Logistics Battalion 4 "The Supporting Edge"
    - Combat Logistics Regiment 37
      - Combat Logistics Battalion 31 "Atlas Battalion"
    - 3rd Maintenance Battalion
    - 3rd Supply Battalion
    - 9th Engineer Support Battalion
  - 7th Communications Battalion
  - 3rd Intelligence Battalion
  - 3rd Law Enforcement Battalion
  - 3rd Radio Battalion
  - 3rd Civilian Affairs Group
- 4th Marine Division (Reserve)
  - Headquarters Battalion "Fighting Four"
  - 14th Marine Regiment (Artillery)
    - 2nd Battalion/14th Marine Regiment
    - 3rd Battalion/14th Marine Regiment
    - 5th Battalion/14th Marine Regiment
  - 23rd Marine Regiment
    - 1st Battalion/23rd Marine Regiment "Lone Star"
    - 2nd Battalion/23rd Marine Regiment "Prepared and Professional"
    - 3rd Battalion/23rd Marine Regiment
    - 2nd Battalion/24th Marine Regiment "The Mad Ghosts"
  - 25th Marine Regiment
    - 1st Battalion/24th Marine Regiment "The Terror from the North"
    - 1st Battalion/25th Marine Regiment "New England's Own"
    - 2nd Battalion/25th Marine Regiment "Empire Battalion"
    - 3rd Battalion/25th Marine Regiment "Cold Steel Warriors"
  - 4th Reconnaissance Battalion
  - 4th Light Armored Reconnaissance Battalion "Iron Horse Marines"
  - 4th Combat Engineer Battalion "One Team, One Fight"
  - 4th Assault Amphibian Battalion
  - 3rd Force Reconnaissance Company
  - 4th Force Reconnaissance Company
  - 4th Marine Logistic Group
    - Combat Logistics Regiment 4
      - Combat Logistics Battalion 23
      - Combat Logistics Battalion 453
    - Combat Logistics Regiment 45
      - Combat Logistics Battalion 25
      - Combat Logistics Battalion 451
    - 6th Engineer Support Battalion
  - 6th Communications Battalion
  - Intelligence Support Battalion
  - 4th Law Enforcement Battalion
  - 4th Civilian Affairs Group
- Training and Education Command
  - Marine Corps Recruit Depot San Diego
  - Marine Corps Recruit Depot Parris Island
  - Marine Corps Air Ground Combat Center
  - Marine Corps Training Command
  - Marine Corps University
- Special Operations Command
  - Marine Raider Regiment
    - 1st Marine Raider Battalion
    - 2nd Marine Raider Battalion
    - 3rd Marine Raider Battalion
  - Marine Raider Support Group
    - 1st Marine Raider Support Battalion
    - 2nd Marine Raider Support Battalion
    - 3rd Marine Raider Support Battalion
  - Marine Raider Training Center
  - Marine Special Operations Intelligence Battalion
- Marine Corps Embassy Security Group
- Chemical Biological Incident Response Force
- Marine Cryptologic Support Battalion
- Marine Corps Security Force Regiment
  - Marine Corps Security Force Battalion Kings Bay
  - Marine Corps Security Force Battalion Bangor
  - Marine Corps Security Force Company Guantanamo Bay
  - Fleet Anti-terrorism Security Team Company Europe
  - Fleet Anti-terrorism Security Team Company Pacific
  - Fleet Anti-terrorism Security Team Company Central
  - Fleet Anti-terrorism Security Team Company Alpha
  - Fleet Anti-terrorism Security Team Company Bravo
  - Fleet Anti-terrorism Security Team Company Charlie
- Marine Corps Forces Cyberspace Command
  - Marine Corps Cyberspace Operations Group
  - Marine Corps Cyberspace Warfare Group
  - Defensive Cybersecurity Operations Company A (Reserve)
  - Defensive Cybersecurity Operations Company B (Reserve)
- Navy
  - Maritime Expeditionary Security Force
    - Maritime Expeditionary Security Force Group 1
    - Maritime Expeditionary Security Force Group Two

== Uruguay ==
- Marine Infantry Command (Comando de Infanteria de Marina)
- Marine Infantry School (Escuela de Infantería de Marina)

== Venezuela ==
- Marine Infantry Division "General in Chief Simón Bolívar" (División de Infantería de Marina "General en Jefe Simón Bolívar")
  - 1st Marine Infantry Amphibious Brigade "Captain Manuel Ponte Rodriguez" (1a Brigada de Infantería de Marina Anfibia "Capitán de Navío Manuel Ponte Rodríguez")
    - 11th Marine Infantry Battalion "General Rafael Urdaneta" (Batallón de Infantería de Marina Nro. 11 "General Rafael Urdaneta")
    - 12th Marine Infantry Mechanized Battalion "Lieutenant Commander Miguel Ponce Lugo" (Batallón de Infantería de Marina Mecanizada Nro.12 "Capitán de Corbeta Miguel Ponce Lugo")
    - 13th Artillery Battalion "General Augustin Codazzi" (Grupo de Artillería Nro. 13 "General Agustín Codazzi")
    - 14th Amphibious Support Battalion "Rear Admiral José Ramón Yépez" (Batallón de Apoyo Anfibio Nro.14 "Contralmirante José Ramón Yépez")
  - 2nd Marine Infantry Amphibious Brigade "José Eugenio Hernández" (2a Brigada de Infantería de Marina Anfibia "José Eugenio Hernández")
    - 21st Marine Infantry Battalion "General José Francisco Bermúdez" (Batallón de Infantería de Marina Nro. 21 "General José Francisco Bermúdez")
    - 22nd Marine Infantry Battalion "Marshal Antonio José de Sucre" (Batallón de Infantería de Marina Nro. 22 "Mariscal Antonio José de Sucre")
    - 23rd Artillery Battalion "General in Chief José Antonio Anzoátegui" (Grupo de Artillería Nro. 23 "General en Jefe José Antonio Anzoátegui")
    - 24th Amphibious Support Battalion "General Juan Bautista Arismendi" (Batallón de Apoyo Anfibio Nro 24 "General Juan Bautista Arismendi")
  - 3rd Marine Infantry Amphibious Brigade "Manuela Sáenz" (3a Brigada de Infantería de Marina Anfibia "Manuela Sáenz")
    - 31st Amphibious Vehicles Battalion "General Simón Bolívar" (Batallón de Vehículos Anfibios Nro. 31 "General Simón Bolívar")
    - 32nd Marine Infantry Battalion "Admiral Luis Brión" (Batallón de Infantería de Marina Nro. 32 "Almirante Luis Brión")
    - 33rd Artillery Battalion "Vice Admiral Lino de Clemente" (Grupo de Artillería Nro. 33 "Vicealmirante Lino de Clemente")
    - 34th Support Battalion "Pedro Gual" (Batallón de Apoyo Nro. 34 "Pedro Gual")
  - 4th Marine Infantry Amphibious Brigade "Almirante Alejandro Petión" (4a Brigada de Infantería de Marina Anfibia "Almirante Alejandro Petión")
    - 41st Amphibious Vehicles Battalion "Generalísimo Francisco de Miranda" (Batallón de Vehículos Anfibios Nro. 41"Generalísimo Francisco de Miranda")
    - 42nd Marine Infantry Battalion "Rear Admiral Renato Beluche" (Batallón de Infantería de Marina Nro. 42 "Contralmirante Renato Beluche")
    - 43rd Self-Propelled Artillery Battalion "Marshal Juan Crisóstomo Falcón" (Grupo de Artillería Autopropulsada Nro. 43 "Marsical Juan Crisóstomo Falcón")
    - 44th Amphibious Support Battalion "Ana María Campos" (Batallón de Apoyo Anfibio Nro. 44 "Ana María Campos")
  - 5th Marine Infantry Riverine Brigade " Commander José Tomás Machado" (5a Brigada de Infantería de Marina Fluvial "Capitán de Fragata José Tomás Machado")
    - 51st Marine Infantry Riverine Command "General Daniel Florencio O'Leary" (Comando Fluvial de Infantería de Marina Nro. 51 "General Daniel Florencio O'Leary")
    - 52nd Marine Infantry Riverine Command "General in Chief Ezequiel Zamora" (Comando Fluvial de Infantería de Marina Nro. 52 "General en Jefe Ezequiel Zamora")
    - 53rd Marine Infantry Riverine Command "José María España" (Comando Fluvial de Infantería de Marina Nro. 53 "José María España")
    - 54th Riverine Squadron "Captain Antonio Díaz" (Escuadrón Fluvial Nro. 54 "Capitán de Navio Antonio Díaz ")
    - 55th Air Cavalry Group "Lieutenant Pedro Lucas Urribarri" (Grupo de Caballería Aérea Nro. 55 "Teniente de Navio Pedro Lucas Urribarri")
    - 56th Riverine Support Battalion "Ensign Vincente Parrado" (Batallón de Apoyo Fluvial Nro. 56 "Alférez Vicente Parrado")
  - 6th Marine Infantry Riverine Brigade "Admiral Manuel Ezequiel Bruzual" (6a Brigada de Infantería de Marina Fluvial "Almirante Manuel Ezequiel Bruzual")
    - 61st Marine Infantry Riverine Command "Rear Admiral José María García" (Comando Fluvial de Infantería de Marina Nro. 61 "Contralmirante José María García")
    - 62nd Marine Infantry Riverine Command "Lieutenant Jacinto Muñoz" (Comando Fluvial de Infantería de Marina Nro. 62 "Teniente de Navio Jacinto Muñoz")
    - 63rd Marine Infantry Riverine Command "Lieutenant Pedro Camejo" (Comando Fluvial de Infantería de Marina Nro. 63 "Teniente Pedro Camejo")
    - 64th Air Cavalry Group "General in Chief José Gregorio Monagas" (Grupo de Caballería Aérea Nro. 64 "General en Jefe José Gregorio Monagas")
    - 65th Riverine Support Battalion "Commander Joaquín Quintero" (Batallón de Apoyo Fluvial Nro. 65 "Capitán de Fragata Joaquín Quintero")
  - 7th Marine Infantry Riverine Brigade "Brigadier Franz Risquez Iribarren" (7a Brigada de Infantería de Marina Fluvial "General de Brigada Franz Risquez Iribarren")
    - 71st Marine Infantry Riverine Command "Rear Admiral Francisco Pérez Hernández" (Comando Fluvial de Infantería de Marina Nro. 71 "Contralmirante Francisco Pérez Hernández")
    - 72nd Marine Infantry Riverine Command "Rear Admiral Armando Medina" (Comando Fluvial de Infantería de Marina Nro. 72 "Contralmirante Armando Medina")
    - 73rd Air Cavalry Group "Captain Sebastián Boguier" (Grupo de Caballería Aérea Nro. 73 "Capitán de Navío Sebastián Boguier")
    - 74th Riverine Support Battalion "Colonel Antonio Ricaurte" (Batallón de Apoyo Fluvial Nro. 74 "Coronel Antonio Ricaurte")
  - 8th Sea Commando Brigade "Generalísimo Francisco de Miranda" (8a Brigada de Infantería de Comandos del Mar "Generalísimo Francisco de Miranda")
    - 81st Special Operations Battalion "Lieutenant Commander Henry Lilong García" (Batallón de Operaciones Especiales Nro. 81 "Capitán de Corbeta Henry Lilong García")
    - 82nd Amphibious Reconnaissance Battalion "General in Chief José Félix Ribas" (Batallón de Reconocimiento Anfibio Nro. 82 "General en Jefe José Félix Ribas")
    - 83rd Special Forces Battalion "Cacique Guaicaipuro" (Batallón de Fuerzas Especiales Nro. 83 "Cacique Guaicaipuro")
    - 84th Support Battalion "Juan Germán Roscio" (Batallón de Apoyo Nro.84 "Juan Germán Roscio")
  - 9th Naval Police Brigade "Grand Marshal de Ayacucho" (9a Brigada de Policia Naval "Gran Mariscal de Ayacucho")
    - 91st Naval Police Battalion "Captain José Alejo Troconis del Mas" (Batallón de Policía Naval Nro 91 "Capitán de Navío José Alejo Troconis del Mas")
    - 92nd Naval Police Battalion "Rear Admiral Matías Padrón" (Batallón de Policía Naval Nro 92 "Contralmirante Matías Padrón ")
    - 93rd Naval Police Battalion "Rear Admiral Otto Pérez Seijas" (Batallón de Policía Naval Nro 93 "Contralmirante Otto Pérez Seijas")
    - 94th Naval Police Battalion "Captain Juan Daniel Danels" (Batallón de Policía Naval Nro 94 "Capitán de Navío Juan Daniel Danels")
  - Marine Infantry Reserve and Replacements Regiment "Rear Admiral Armando López Conde" (Regimiento de Reserva y Reemplazos de la Infantería de Marina "Contraalmirante Armando López Conde")
  - Marine Infantry Signal Battalion "Commander Felipe Baptista" (Batallón de Comunicaciones de la Infantería de Marina " Capitán de Fragata Felipe Baptista")
  - Marine Infantry Support Battalion "Admiral Luis Brión"(Batallón de Apoyo de la Infantería de Marina "Admiral Luis Brión")
  - Bolivarian Marine Infantry Qualification and Training School "Rear Admiral Armando López Conde" (Escuela de Capacitación y Formación de la Infantería de Marina Bolivariana "Contralmirante Armando López Conde")
- Militia
  - Special Naval Unit "Puerto Cabello" (Formacion Especial Naval "Puerto Cabello")

== Vietnam ==
- Naval Infantry Forces (Binh chủng Hải quân Đánh bộ)
  - 101st Naval Infantry Brigade (Lữ đoàn Hải quân Đánh bộ 101)
  - 147th Naval Infantry Brigade (Lữ đoàn Hải quân Đánh bộ 147)
- 5th Naval Special Forces Brigade (Lữ đoàn Đặc công 5)
- 126th Naval Special Forces Brigade (Lữ đoàn Đặc công Hải quân 126)

== Zambia ==
- 48th Marine Unit

== See also ==
- List of CBRN warfare forces
- List of cyber warfare forces
- List of paratrooper forces
