= Ukrainian Marine Corps =

Maritime land force of Ukraine

- Корпус морської піхоти України
- Cap badge (cockade) of the Ukrainian Naval Infantry
- Founded: May 23, 1918; February 22, 1992 (reestablished)
- Country: Ukraine
- Type: Marines
- Role: Amphibious warfare, coastal defense
- Size: 6,000 (2022)
- Part of: Armed Forces of Ukraine
- Garrison/HQ: Mykolaiv, Mykolaiv Oblast, Ukraine
- Motto: "Always faithful!" (Ukrainian: Вірний завжди!)
- Colors: Light green
- Anniversaries: May 23
- Engagements: Ukrainian War of Independence; Ukrainian–Soviet War; Russo-Ukrainian War: Annexation of Crimea by the Russian Federation; Russo-Ukrainian War; 2022 Russian invasion of Ukraine; Siege of Mariupol; Battle of Mykolaiv; 2023 Ukrainian counteroffensive

Commanders
- Commander: MG Dmytro Delyatytskyi

Insignia
- Shoulder sleeve insignia

- Service flag

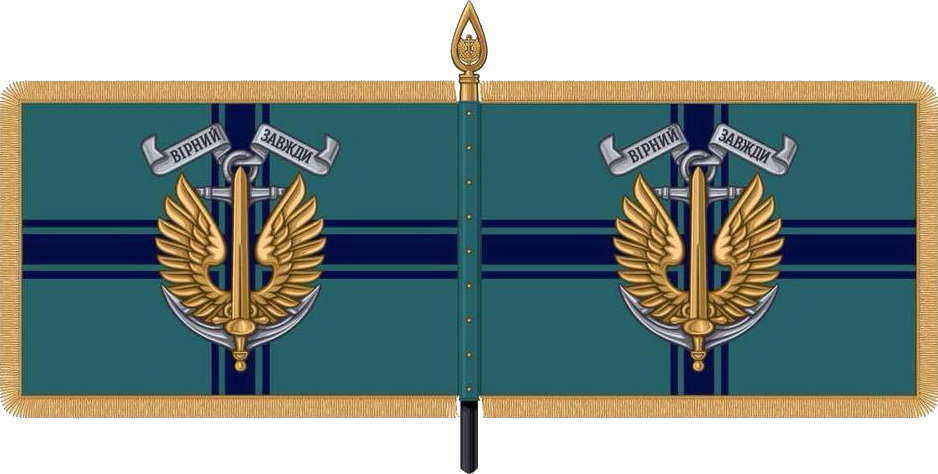
- Garrison colour

The Ukrainian Marine Corps (Ukrainian: Корпус морської піхоти України, lit. 'Corps of maritime infantry of Ukraine'), also known simply as the Ukrainian Marines (Ukrainian: Морська піхота України, romanized: Morska pikhota Ukrainy, lit. 'Marine Infantry of Ukraine'), is the maritime land force service branch of the Armed Forces of Ukraine since 2023, responsible for conducting expeditionary and amphibious operations. From its modern foundation in 1993 up to 2023 it constituted part of the Coastal Forces of the Ukrainian Navy. It is used as a component part of amphibious, airborne and amphibious-airborne operations, alone or in coordination with formations and units of the Ground Forces in order to capture parts of the seashore, islands, ports, fleet bases, coast airfields and other coast objects from the enemy. It can also be used to defend naval bases, vital shoreline areas, separate islands and coast objects, and security of hostile areas.

== Mission ==
The Marine Corps's principal missions are to:

- Act independently during attacks on enemy naval installations, ports, islands and coastal areas
- Clear the enemy's coastal areas & provide amphibious landing elements and security forces in support of its own mission or with elements of the Ground Forces and other uniformed organizations
- (since 2023) provide, alongside the Navy, the country's coastal defense capabilities against enemy shipping and enemy amphibious attacks

Its motto is Вірний завжди! ("Always Faithful!") .

== History ==
The Marine Corps is descended from the formations of the Black Sea Fleet Naval Infantry of the former Imperial Russian Navy.

=== Hetmanate ===
Former Russian Imperial army general Pavlo Skoropadskyi understood the importance of naval infantry in providing security to the country. Being the commander-in-chief of land and naval forces, Skoropadskyi brought attention to creating the naval infantry during his first month in power. On May 23, 1918, he ordered the Department of Navy to Begin forming a Brigade of naval infantry consisting of three regiments.

The mission of the Naval Infantry was protecting coastal areas, serving as a garrison force for forts and conducting landing operations. According to the order the Brigade was divided into three regiments. First regiment was responsible for the areas between the western border until the village of Suchavka, near Odesa. Second regiment was responsible for territory between Suchavka and Stanislavov. Third regiment protected the areas from Stanislavov until Perekop. Brigade was also put in charge of guarding the property of the Navy Department.

Each of the three regiments consisted of three kurins. Each kurin consisted of three Sotnia and a machine gun unit. Commandant of the first regiment was Ilarion Isaievych.

On August 31, 1918, each unit was given the permanent headquarters. First regiment's HQ was located in Odesa, second's HQ in Mykolaiv and third's HQ in Kherson. Also at this time 3 squadrons of cavalry were formed. First was stationed in Odesa, second in Ochakiv and third in Perekop.

In October 1918 new recruits born in 1899, would have joined the ranks of the naval infantry, however due to the political situation of that autumn the recruits had to wait until a better time.

=== Ukrainian People's Republic ===
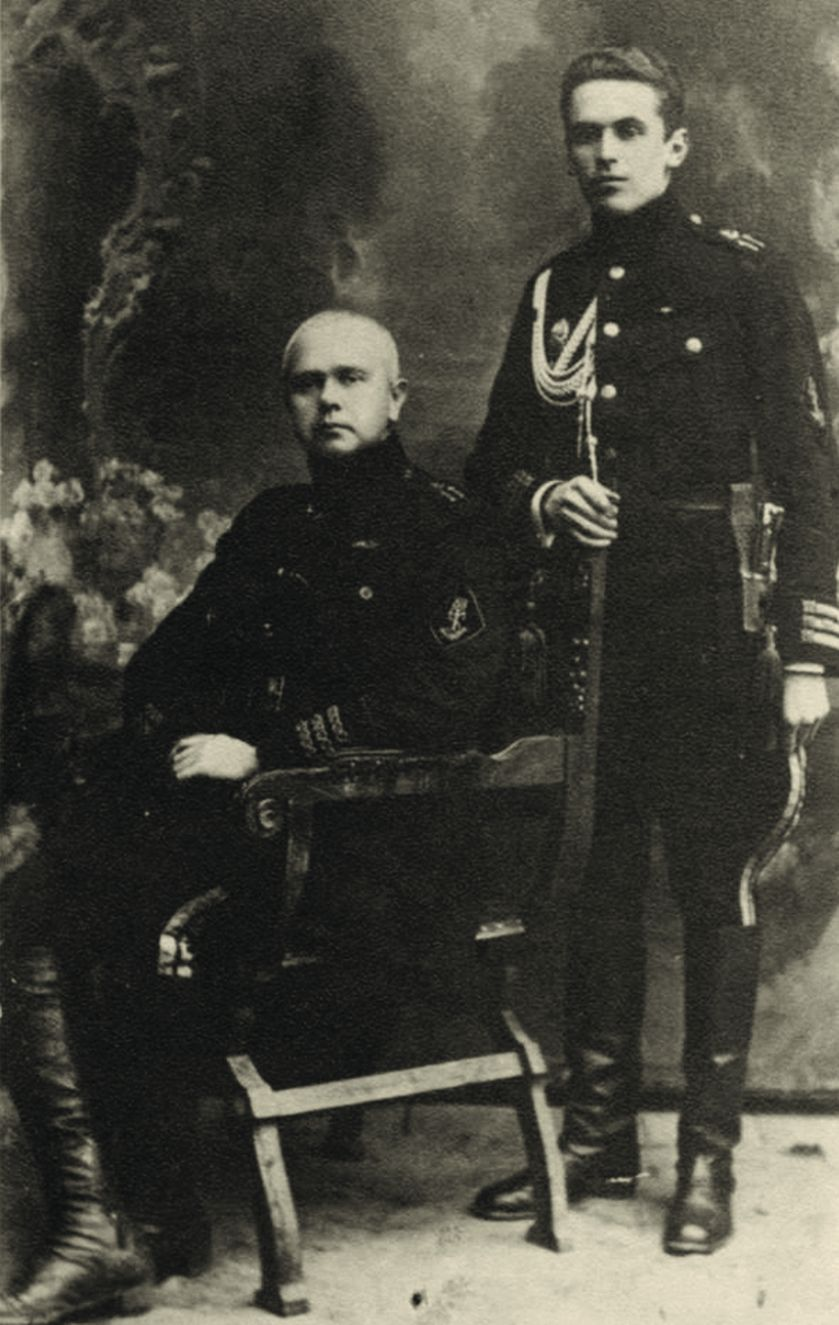
Command of the Ukrainian People's Republic's Marine Division, Mykhailo Bilynskyi on the right (1919)

Not long after, Pavlo Skoropadskyi was removed from power in an uprising led by Symon Petliura. The Naval Infantry continued to faithfully serve their nation under the banner of the Ukrainian People's Republic. A prominent organizer of Ukrainian marine troops during the period of Ukrainian War of Independence was the former minister of naval affairs, Mykhailo Bilinskyi. In April 1919 the 1st Ukrainian Marine Division was created under Bilynskyi's command. The unit included a naval infantry regiment composed of Hutsuls from the outskirts of Kolomyia, many of whom had earlier served in the Austro-Hungarian Navy and who were recruited due to their lower tolerance to Communist ideas. The unit was distinguished by its black uniforms worn both by officers and by regular marines, and the servicemen's equipment involved naval dirks.

Bilynskyi's regiment took part in the successful First Winter Campaign of Ukrainian forces, but following the retreat across the Zbruch river its soldiers were placed in internment camps. Following the Treaty of Riga, the unit entered Bolshevik-controlled Ukraine as part of the Second Winter Campaign in order to raid the territory and encourage an anti-Moscow uprising. On 12 November 1921 Bilynskyi was wounded at the head of his troops while crossing the river Teteriv, and on 17 November Ukrainian forces were defeated in a battle at Mali Minky by the cavalry of Grigory Kotovsky. Surrounded by the enemy, Bilynskyi committed suicide to evade capture. This signified the last armed attempt to achieve Ukraine's independence during that war. In modern Ukraine a naval infantry brigade has been named after Bilynskyi.

=== Modern history ===
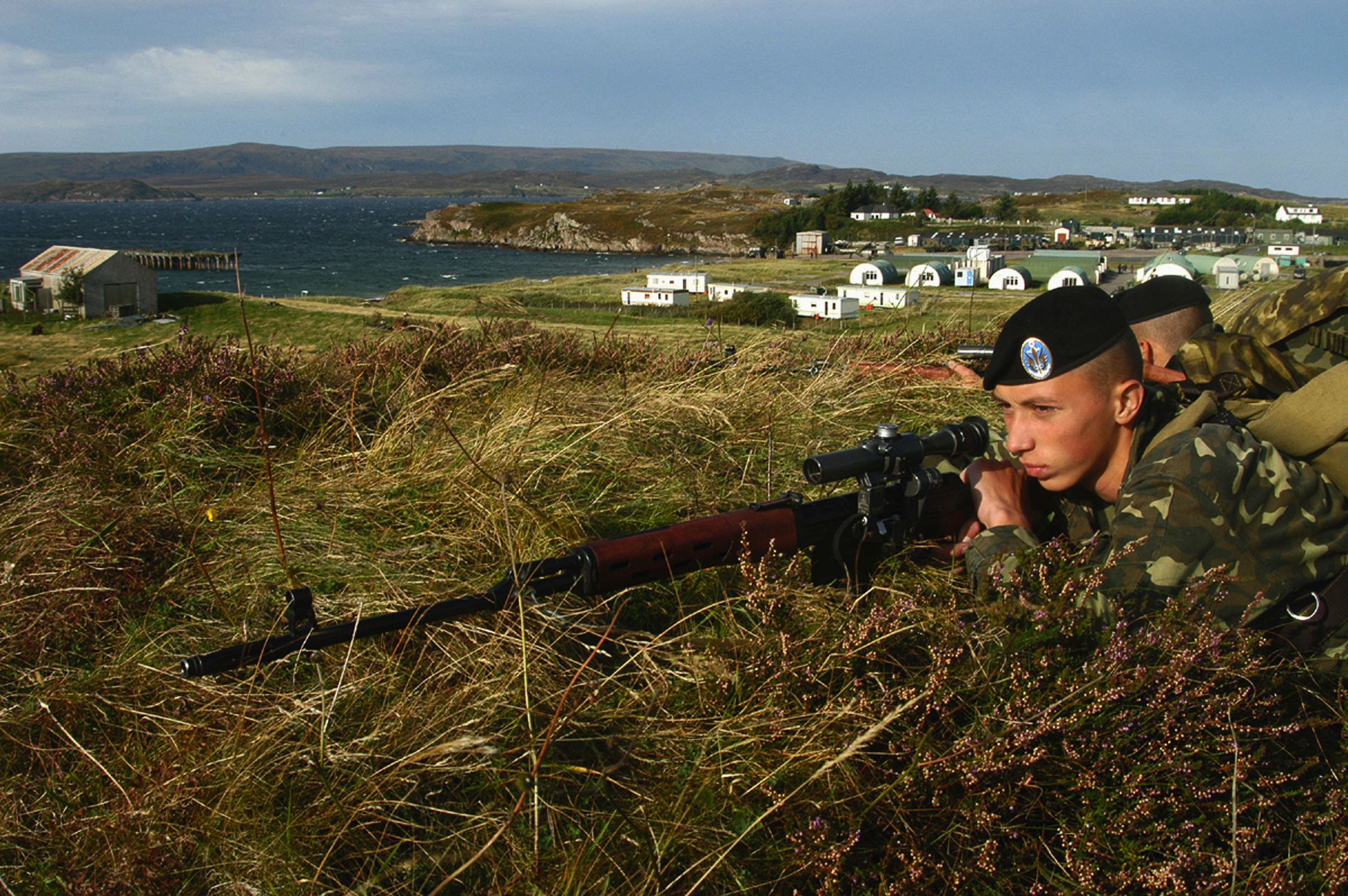
A Ukrainian naval infantryman armed with a Dragunov sniper rifle takes part in Exercise Northern Light '03 on the west coast of Scotland in 2003.

On February 22, 1992, the 880th Separate Naval Infantry Battalion of the Black Sea Fleet commanded by Major Vitaliy Rozhmanov pledged their allegiance to Ukraine.

After the Navy was created on July 1, 1993, as a separate service branch of the Armed Forces, the first battalion of the Naval Infantry was formed in the city of Sevastopol. The first naval infantrymen were transferred from the airmobile units. On September 1, 1993, the 41st Separate Naval Infantry Battalion was formed. By September 20, 1994, the 4th Naval Infantry Brigade was stationed in the Tylove village of Crimea.

From May 1996 until 1998, the Brigade was a part of the Ukrainian National Guard. In 1998, it was transferred to the Navy and re-designated the 1st Separate Naval Infantry Brigade. In 1999, the Brigade consisted of two battalions numbering 1,500 marines. During 2003–04, the Ukrainian armed forces underwent a program to reduce the number of brigades, and the Naval Infantry Brigade was reduced to a Battalion.

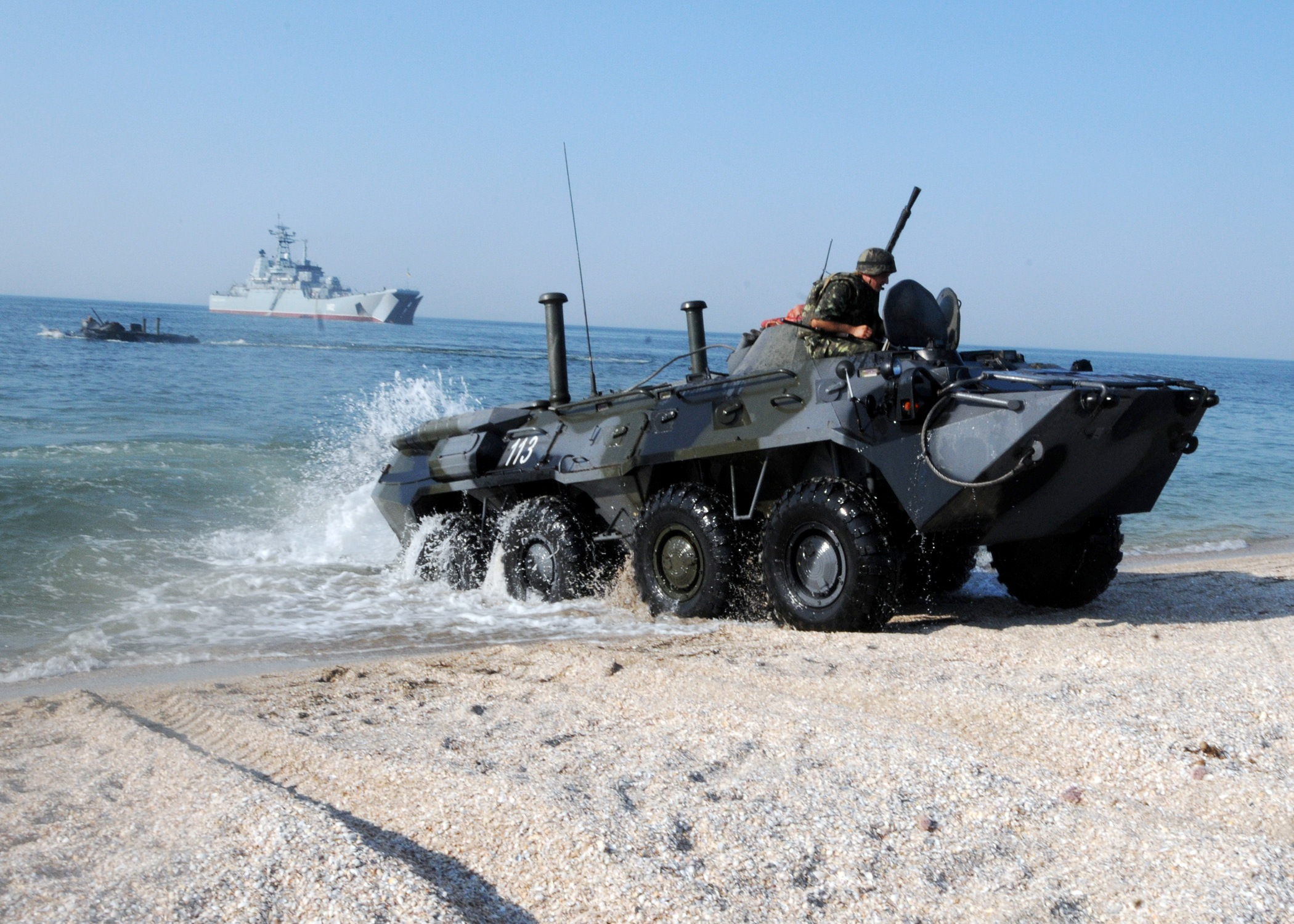
A Ukrainian Naval Infantry BTR-80 takes part in Exercise Sea Breeze 2010.

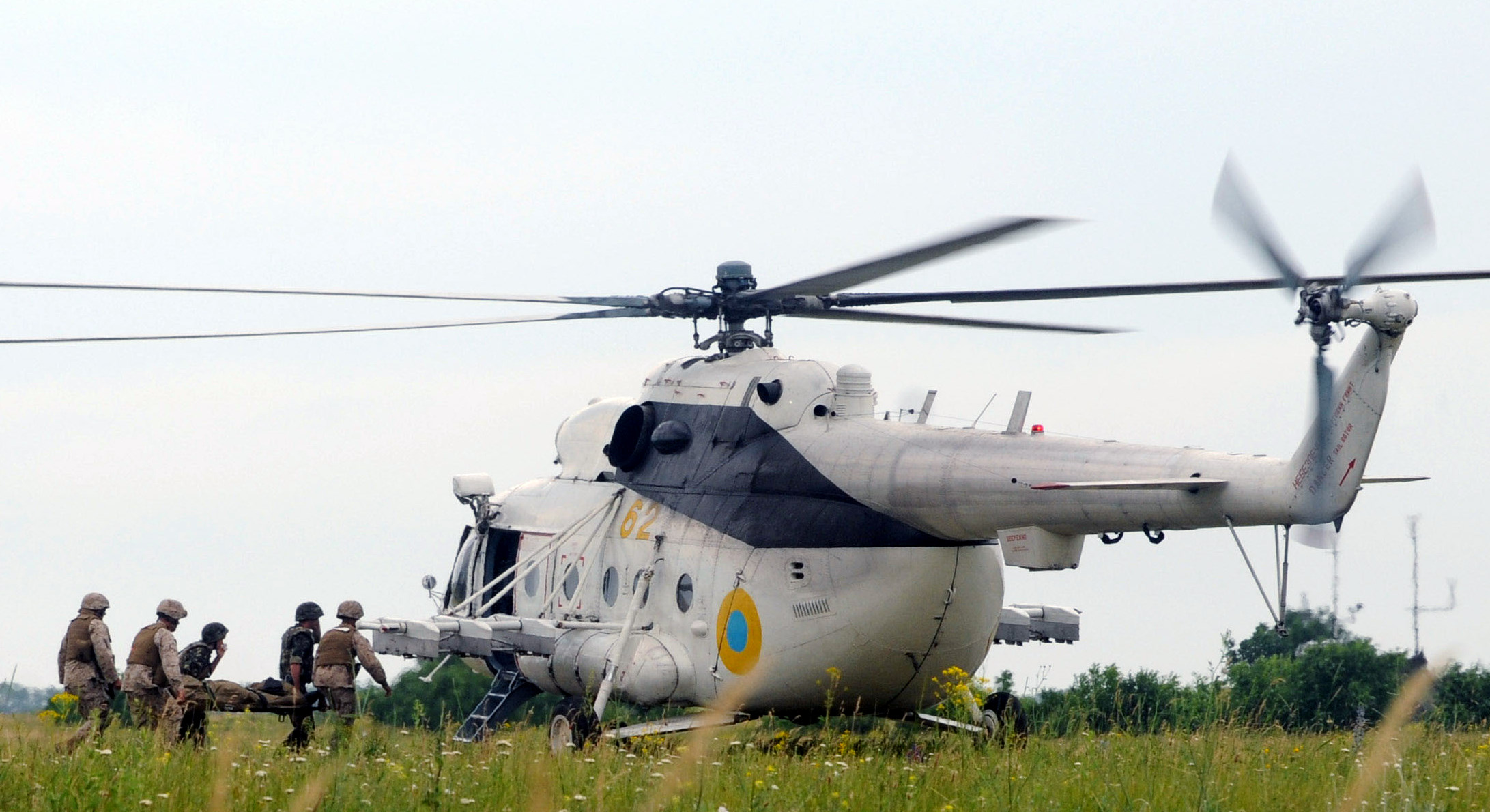
US and Ukrainian marines simulating casualty extraction using a Mi-8 during the multinational Sea Breeze exercise in 2011.

The command of the Naval Forces of the Armed Forces of Ukraine made a decision to form a new Naval Infantry battalion by force of a mechanised battalion located in Kerch. In December 2013 the militaries of the new 501st Separate Naval Infantry Battalion have taken the Naval Infantry Oath.

The 1st Separate Naval Infantry Battalion was under the jurisdiction of the 36th Separate Coastal Defense Brigade, and it was stationed in Feodosiya and there was also another one battalion (501st Bn.) which was stationed in Kerch; both were in the Crimea until late March 2014.

Special reconnaissance units of the Marine Corps were deployed against insurgents during the 2014 war in Donbas. Oleksandr Zinchenko of the 73rd Spetsnaz Detachment was the first Ukrainian Marine killed during the war in Donbas. The Ukrainian Marine Corps was particularly hard hit by the Russian annexation of Crimea as all of their forces except for the 73rd Spetsnaz Detachment were stationed on the peninsula, due to this the unit had to undergo extensive reorganization before being able to be deployed to the war in the Donbas. After the annexation of Crimea there were only 200 marines left in the Ukrainian Naval Infantry, members of the 1st Marine Battalion who had been led by Lieutenant Colonel Dmytro Delyatytskyi out of Crimea to Mykolaiv.

In September 2014 the Ministry of Defense announced that the Marine Corps were reforming from the Russian annexation of Crimea and the remaining members of the 1st Marine Battalion which was stationed in Feodosya would take an active part in the war in Donbas. On 29 October 2014 Ukraine's Marine Corps conventional forces, recently recovered from the annexation of Crimea suffered their first casualty near Mariupol, the Marine was a Major and was killed when his unit's position came under Russian artillery fire.

On 8 November 2014 Ukrainian marines returned to their permanent place of deployment in Mykolaiv as part of a regular rotation of Ukrainian forces during the war in Donbas. Also that year, 16 November was made the official holiday of the Ukrainian naval infantry, because that was when the first oath of office was taken by Ukrainian marines in 1992. The holiday remained on that date until 2018.

In 2016 the Odesa Military Academy began training the first class of Naval Infantry officers. Prior to this, there was no specific training institution for marine officers, who came from other branches of service, such as the Ukrainian Ground Forces or the Airmobile Forces. Because of the shortage of officers in the Naval Infantry some of the cadets at the academy that were training to become Airmobile Forces officers were offered courses to become marine officers instead. In 2018 the first twelve of these cadets graduated as Marine Corps lieutenants.

In January 2018 it was reported that the Ukrainian government planned to create a Marine Corps to place all Naval Infantry and Coastal Artillery units of the Ukrainian Navy under one command. At this time it was not a separate branch but part of the Naval Forces. As of January 2018 the Coastal and Territorial Defense Forces of the Navy included the 36th Marine Brigade in Mykolaiv, 137th Separate Marine Battalion in Dachne, Odesa Oblast, the 406th Marine Artillery Brigade in Mykolaiv, and the 32nd Separate Artillery Regiment in Altestove, Odesa Oblast. The Naval Infantry were commanded by Colonel Serhii Tartakovskyi. The creation of the Marine Corps Command was a step towards bringing the Ukrainian Navy into line with NATO structures. On 22 February 2018, Decree No.39/2018 of the President of Ukraine established the Marine Corps Command.

On 23 May 2018, the NI celebrated the first Marine Corps Birthday celebrations, the holiday being officially sanctioned by President Petro Poroshenko as part of a nationalization of the former Soviet holidays, replacing those with the ones celebrating Ukrainian military history. The holiday marked the formation of the first marine units in May 1918, during the Ukrainian War of Independence. New colours were awarded incorporating the speciality badge awarded to the unit in 2007. The NI was transformed into the Fleet Marine Division with 2 brigades and an independent brigade of marine artillery. The former black berets were changed to light green following the practice of the British Royal Marines and the Italian Army Lagunari.

==== Expansion ====
The new colours include the blue cross from the naval ensign as an acknowledgement of its role as a constituent service of the Navy. Plans are underway for the formation of a 3rd Marine brigade, bringing the total number of brigades to four plus one MRL regiment, with an option for a fourth brigade.

==== Reform ====
The ideal goal in the reform of the Marine Corps is to form a unit which would be similar to the units sent to Iraq. It is planned that there will be no more conscripts in the Corps, only professional naval infantrymen under contract service.

=== 2022 Russian invasion of Ukraine ===
With the 2022 Russian invasion of Ukraine, the Naval Infantry fought against Russian forces invading the country. They are active at the southern regions of Ukraine, having participated at the Southern Ukraine and Eastern Ukraine campaigns.

As of early 2022 the Ukrainian Marines had 7,000 troops organized in two brigades, six separate battalions battalions, and a separate reconnaissance battalion.

==== Siege of Mariupol ====
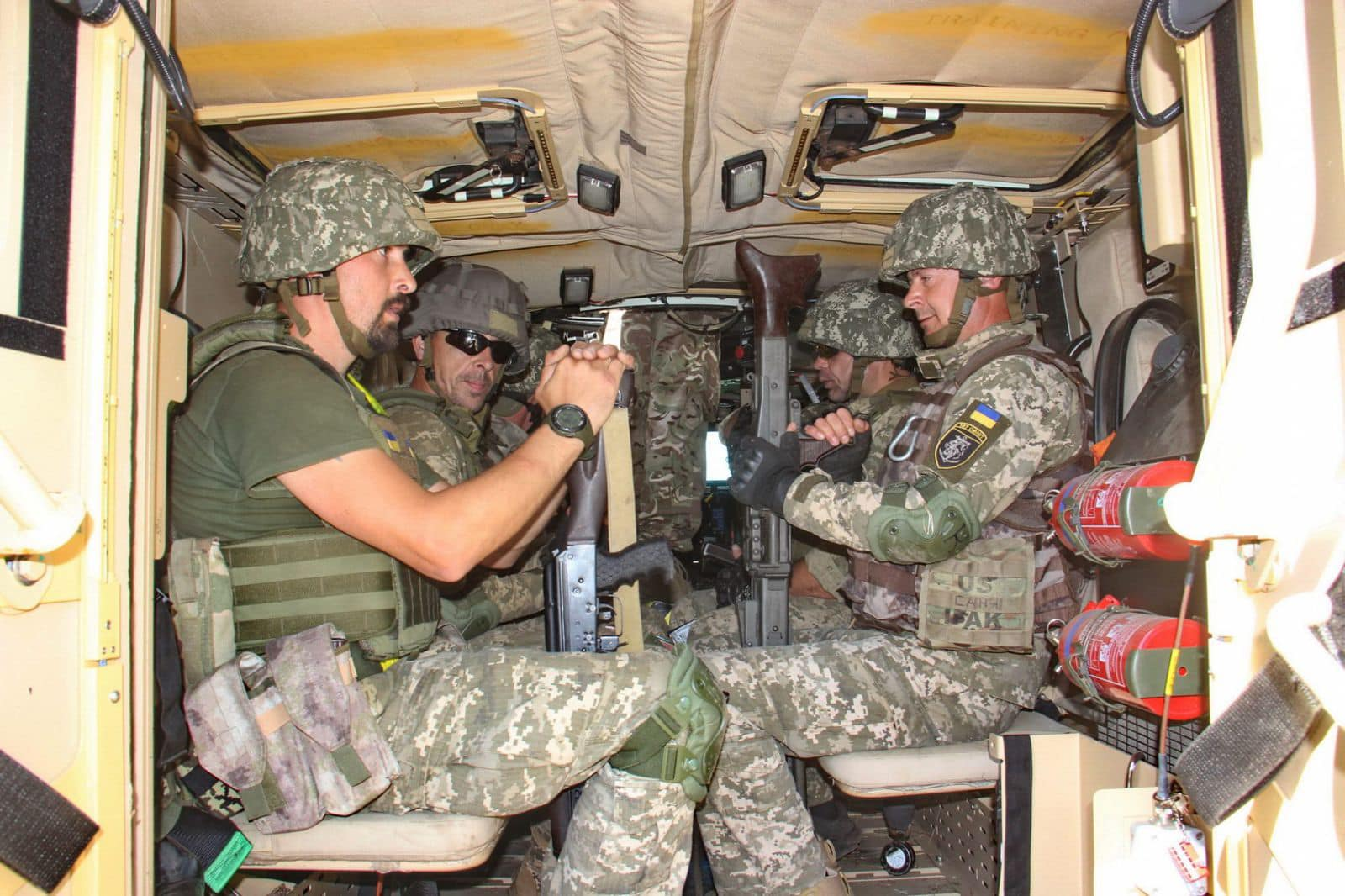
Ukrainian Marines inside a British-donated Mastiff PPV and with a MG 3 machine gun during the 2022 invasion of Ukraine

On 12 April 2022, videos have emerged of fighters apparently from the 501st Battalion of the 36th Separate Marine Brigade vowing not to surrender their positions, saying "We are holding on to every bit of the city wherever possible," and "But the reality is the city is encircled and blocked and there was no re-supply of ammunition or food,". The next day, Russian Defence Ministry as well as the Chechen leader Ramzan Kadyrov announced 1,026 Ukrainian Marines, including 162 officers, of the 36th Separate Marine Brigade laid down their weapons and surrendered in Mariupol. Ukrainian Defence Ministry spokesperson Oleksandr Motuzyanyk said he had no information about the claim, and there was no immediate comment from the Ukrainian President's office nor the Ukrainian general staff. A top advisor to Ukraine's President Volodymyr Zelenskyy has said another Marine unit that was encircled in the middle of Mariupol had broken through to connect with the Azov Regiment and that Mariupol is still standing. By 16 April, the Marines and Azov had entrenched themselves in the Azovstal iron and steel works, the last Ukrainian bastion in Mariupol. By May 17, most Azovstal defenders surrendered.

=== Promotion to service branch of the Armed Forces ===
In celebration of the 105th Marine Corps Birthday on 23 May 2023, President Volodymyr Zelenskyy, in his capacity as Supreme Commander in Chief of the Armed Forces, in a visit to a Marine Corps installation announced that effective that day, in gratitude for service to the nation and people, especially during the ongoing Russian invasion, after more than three decades since its reactivation the Marine Corps was to be officially separated from the Ukrainian Navy and was elevated into a service branch of the Armed Forces of Ukraine, with its Commandant General now a part of the General Staff and appointed by the Commander in Chief of the AFU.

While it will be a separate service branch of the Armed Forces, arrangements have been made for the Navy to continue assisting the Marine Corps in its amphibious operations through its landing craft and providing air cover as well as providing shore gunnery support from its vessels for its landing operations. The decision to bifurcate from the Navy proper and become an independent branch of the AFU was made with the needs of the Corps and its growing number of servicemen and women currently fighting against Russian forces during the ongoing invasion taken into account, as well as the status of its constituent formations and its mission and obligations in regards to provisions of the Constitution and laws of the republic as a part of the wider Armed Forces in both war and peace. The Corps will also continue to provide Marine detachments to serve in the Navy's seagoing and riverine assets and in defense of its naval bases and stations. Another reason for the separation of its command structure from the Navy was the recognition that the Marine Corps needs to have independence in decision making to more effectively carry out amphibious operations.

With the separation, the Fleet Marine Division was transformed into the 1st Marine Division, responsible for the operational combat formations of the Marine Corps. The Navy's overall ground based coastal defense capabilities have been under Marine Corps control since the separation.

==== Dnieper river campaign ====
In October 2023, the 38th Marine Brigade crossed the Dnieper river into the Russian-controlled Kherson Oblast and captured a bridgehead on the left bank at the village of Krynky. The fighting there has continued into 2024, with at least three Marine Corps brigades being deployed for the campaign. The Ukrainian marines have taken notably heavy losses while crossing the river and fighting to maintain the bridgehead.

== Organization ==
=== Organization 1918 ===
- Divisional HQ
- 1st Marine Regiment - Odesa
  - HHC
  - 1st Kurin
    - 1st Sotnia
    - 2nd Sotnia
    - 3rd Sotnia
    - Machine Gun Sotnia
  - 2nd Kurin
    - same organization as 1st Kurin
  - 3rd Kurin
    - same organization as 1st Kurin
- 2nd Regiment - Mykolaiv
  - same organization as 1st Regiment
- 3rd Regiment - Kherson
  - same organization as 1st Regiment
- 1st Cavalry Squadron - Odesa
- 2nd Cavalry Squadron - Ochakiv
- 3rd Cavalry Squadron - Perekop

=== Organization 1998 ===
- Corps Headquarters
  - 1st Air Assault Battalion "Lion"
  - 2nd Air Assault Battalion "Berkut"
  - 1st Air Assault Reconnaissance Battalion "Sword"
  - 1st Marine Artillery Battalion
  - 2nd Marine Artillery Battalion
  - 1st Anti-Aircraft Artillery Battalion
  - 1st Anti-Tank Battalion
  - Combat Engineer Battalion "Crab"
  - Signal Company

=== Organization 2018 ===
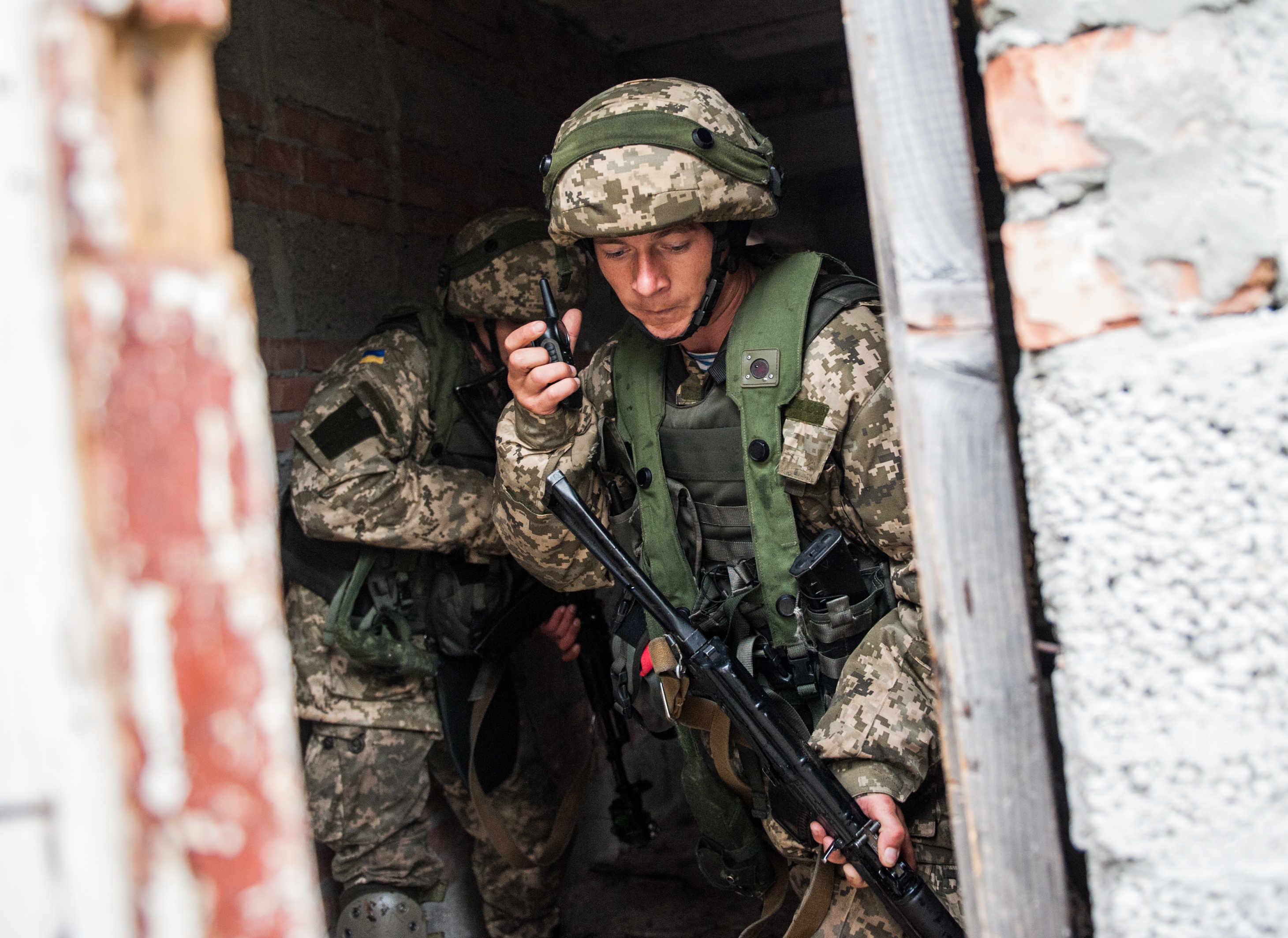
Ukrainian marines practicing urban warfare during the Rapid Trident 2014 exercise on 23 September 2014.

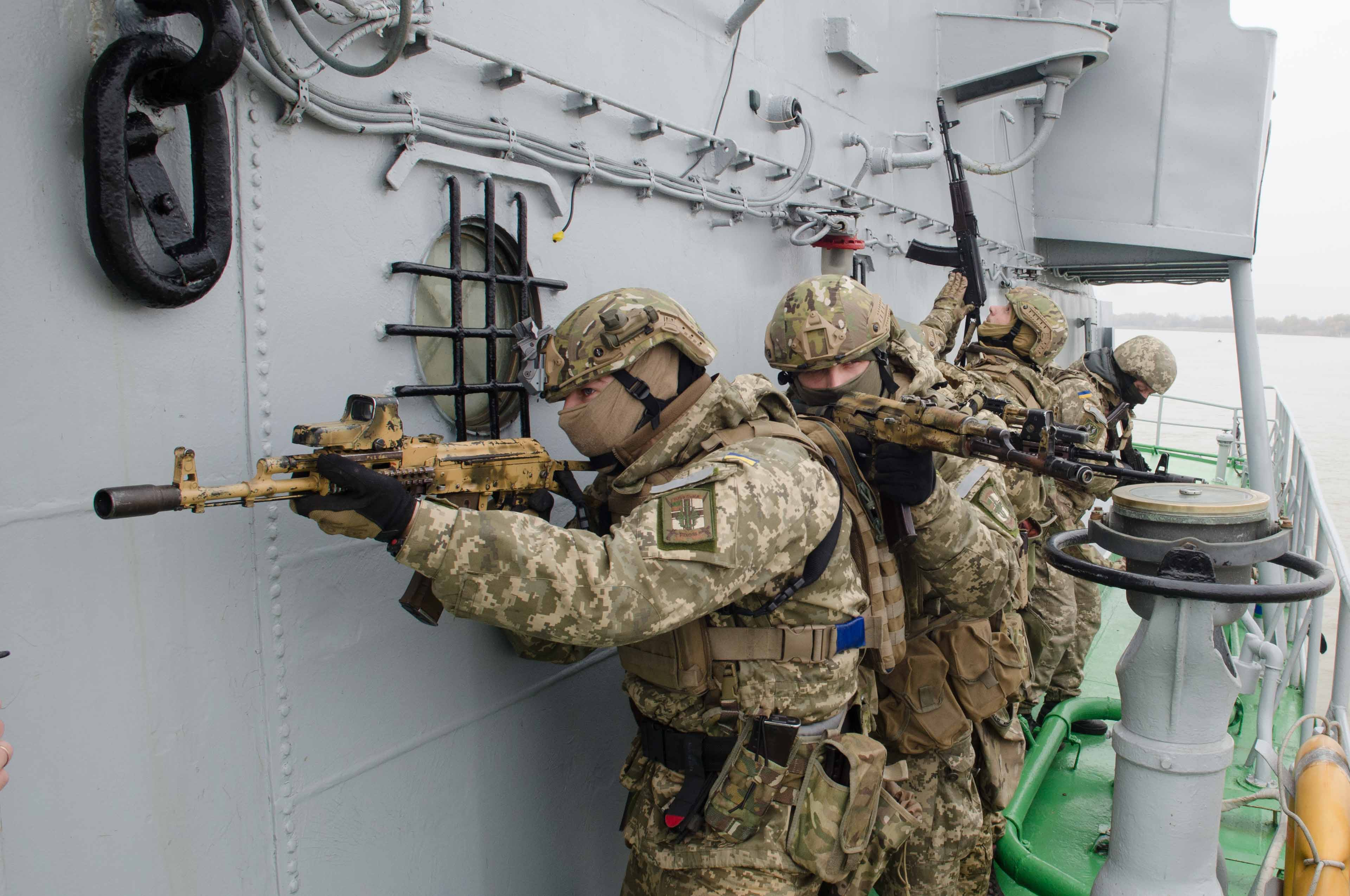
1st Naval Infantry Battalion in 2017.

In 2018 the Naval Infantry Division's Organization was as follows:

- 1st Marine Division, Ukrainian Marine Corps, Mykolaiv
  - Division HQ
  - Division HQ Services Battalion
    - Guard of Honour Company
  - Marine Basic School, Mykolaiv
  - 210th Marine Basic Training Center, Radens'k
  - 35th Marine Brigade, Dachne
    - Headquarters & Services Company
    - 136th Marine Battalion (under formation)
    - 137th Marine Battalion
    - 18th Naval Infantry Battalion (under formation)
    - 88th Marine Battalion (Air Assault) (under formation)
    - 2nd Marine Tank Battalion
    - 35th Marine Artillery Group
      - Regimental HQ and Target Acquisition Battery
      - 4th Marine Self-propelled Field Artillery Battalion (2S1 Gvozdika)
      - 5th Marine Rocket Launcher Artillery Battalion (BM-21 Grad)
      - 6th Marine Anti-tank Artillery Battalion (MT-12 Rapira)
      - 25th Marine Artillery Reconnaissance Battalion
      - Security Company
      - Engineer Company
      - Replacement and Maintenance Battery
      - Logistics Company
      - Signals Platoon
      - CBRN-defense Platoon
    - 2nd Marine Anti-Air Defense Missile Artillery Battalion
    - 2nd Marine Combat Engineer Battalion
    - 2nd Marine Maintenance Battalion
    - 2nd Marine Logistics Battalion
    - 2nd Force Reconnaissance Company
    - Sniper Company
    - Electronic Warfare Company
    - Signals Company
    - Anti-Aircraft Radar Company
    - CBRN-defense Company
    - Medical Company
    - Military Police Company
    - 35th Naval Infantry Brigade Band
  - 36th Marine Brigade, Mykolaiv
    - Headquarters & Services Company
    - 1st Marine Battalion, Mykolaiv (BTR-80)
    - 501st Marine Battalion, Mariupol (BTR-80)
    - 505th Marine Battalion (under formation)
    - 4th Marine Battalion (Air Assault) (under formation)
    - 1st Marine Tank Battalion (T-80)
    - 36th Marine Artillery Regiment
      - Regimental HQ and Target Acquisition Battery
      - 1st Naval Infantry Self-propelled Field Artillery Battalion (2S1 Gvozdika)
      - 1st Naval Infantry Rocket Launcher Artillery Battalion (BM-21 Grad)
      - 1st Naval Infantry Anti-tank Artillery Battalion (MT-12 Rapira)
      - Marine Artillery Reconnaissance Battalion
      - Security Company
      - Engineer Company
      - Replacement and Maintenance Battery
      - Logistics Company
      - Signals Platoon
      - CBRN-defense Platoon
    - 1st Marine Anti-Air Defense Missile Artillery Battalion
    - 1st Marine Combat Engineer Battalion
    - 1st Marine Maintenance Battalion
    - 1st Marine Logistics Battalion
    - 1st Force Reconnaissance Company
    - Sniper Company
    - Electronic Warfare Company
    - Signals Company
    - Anti-Aircraft Radar Company
    - CBRN-defense Company
    - Medical Company
    - Military Police Company
    - 34th Marine Brigade Band
  - 37th Marine Brigade
    - Headquarters & Services Company
    - 19th Marine Battalion
    - 20th Marine Battalion
    - 3th Marine Battalion
    - 6th Marine Battalion (under formation)
    - 89th Marine Battalion (Air Assault)
    - 3rd Marine Tank Battalion (T-80)
    - 3rd Marine Artillery Regiment
      - Regimental HQ and Target Acquisition Battery
      - 8th Marine Artillery Battalion (Towed) (D-30)
      - Marine Anti-tank Artillery Battalion (MT-12 Rapira)
      - Naval Infantry Artillery Reconnaissance Battalion
      - Security Company
      - Engineer Company
      - Replacement and Maintenance Battery
      - Logistics Company
      - Signals Platoon
      - CBRN-defense Platoon
    - 37th Marine Anti-Air Defense Missile Artillery Battalion
    - 37th Marine Combat Engineer Battalion
    - 37th Marine Maintenance Battalion
    - 3rd Marine Logistics Battalion
    - 3rd Force Reconnaissance Company
    - Sniper Company
    - Electronic Warfare Company
    - Signals Company
    - Anti-Aircraft Radar Company
    - CBRN-defense Company
    - Medical Company
    - Military Police Company
    - 37th Marine Brigade Band
  - 38th Marine Brigade
    - Headquarters & Services Company
    - 503rd Marine Battalion
    - 25th Marine Battalion
    - 22nd Marine Battalion
    - 91st Marine Battalion (Air Assault) (under formation)
    - 14th Marine Battalion (under formation)
    - 38th Marine Tank Battalion
    - 38th Marine Artillery Regiment
    - 38th Marine Anti-Air Defense Missile Artillery Battalion
    - 38th Marine Combat Engineer Battalion
    - 4th Marine Maintenance Battalion
    - 38th Marine Logistics Battalion
    - 4th Force Reconnaissance Company
    - Sniper Company
    - Electronic Warfare Company
    - Signals Company
    - Anti-Aircraft Radar Company
    - CBRN-defense Company
    - Medical Company
    - Military Police Company
    - 38th Marine Brigade Band
  - 40th Marine Brigade (planned for activation)
    - Headquarters and Service Company (to be raised)
  - 32nd Marine Artillery MLRS Regiment, Altestove
    - Headquarters & Headquarters Battery
    - 1st Marine Rocket Artillery Battalion (BM-27 Uragan)
    - 2nd Marine Rocket Artillery Battalion (BM-21 Grad)
    - 3rd Rocket Artillery Battalion (BM-21 Grad)
    - Security Company
    - Engineer Company
    - MRL Replacement and Maintenance Company
    - Logistic Company
    - Signal Platoon
    - CBRN-defense Platoon
    - Regimental Band
  - 406th Marine Field and Coastal Defense Artillery Brigade (Amphibious)
    - Brigade Headquarters & Target Acquisition Battery
    - 64th Marine Field Artillery Battalion (MU А4217), Bilhorod-Dnistrovskyi, Odesa Oblast
    - 65th Marine Field Artillery Battalion (Coastal Defense), (MU А3687), Dachne-2 village, Odesa Oblast
    - 66th Marine Field Artillery Battalion (MU А2611), Berdyansk, Zaporizhzhia Oblast
    - 67th Marine Field Artillery Battalion (MU А1804), Ochakiv, Mykolaiv Oblast
    - 1st Marine Anti-tank Artillery Battalion (MT-12 Rapira)
    - Marine Artillery Reconnaissance Battalion
    - Security Company
    - Engineers Company
    - Maintenance and Replacement Battery
    - Logistics Company
    - Signals Platoon
    - CBRN-defense Platoon
    - Marine Brigade Band
  - 37th Marine Signals Regiment, Radisne, Odesa Oblast
  - 140th Marine Force Reconnaissance Battalion (raised in 2019) (to be expanded in future as regiment)
  - 1st Marine Anti-Tank Artillery Battalion (Separate) (under formation)
  - 7th Marine Divisional Anti-Air Defense Missile Artillery Battalion, Ochakiv, Mykolaiv Oblast (to be expanded to regiment)
  - 1st Marine Division Engineer Battalion (to be expanded to Regiment size)
  - 1st Marine Divisional Maintenance Battalion
  - Marine Divisional Logistics Battalion
  - Sniper Company
  - 1st Marine Division Electronic Warfare Company
  - HQ Signals Company
  - Anti-Aircraft Radar Company
  - Divisional CBRN-defense Company
  - Divisional Medical Company (to be expanded to battalion)
  - Divisional Military Police Company (to be expanded into battalion)
  - Marine Corps Central Band Mykolaiv

The marine infantry battalions were organized as follows:

- Marine Battalion Headquarters & Headquarters Company
  - 1st Company (Air Assault)
  - 2nd Company
  - 3rd Company
  - Mortar Battery
  - Logistic Company
  - Reconnaissance Platoon
  - Anti-Aircraft Missile Artillery Platoon
  - Anti-tank Artillery Platoon
  - Engineer Platoon
  - Landing Equipment/Assault Amphibian Platoon
  - Signal Platoon
  - Medical Platoon

The tank and artillery battalions are organized similarly but with one to 4 tank companies or artillery batteries.

== Current Structure ==
On 23 May 2023 the Marine Corps, after more than three decades, had its status elevated to that of a service branch of the Armed Forces of Ukraine and the former Fleet Marine Division was transformed into the 1st Marine Division Ukrainian Marine Corps. The Commandant General's status was finally raised into one equal to that of the other service commanders of the armed forces. With the new status the Marine Corps' brigades and pre-war battalions received new coat of arms effective July.

Ukrainian Marine Corps
| Marine Corps General Command | A2022 | Mykolaiv, Mykolaiv Oblast | Commandant General: MG Dmytro Delyatytskyi |
| 80th Marine Headquarters and Service Battalion | n/a | | |
| 241st Marine Corps Training Center | А2407 | Radensk, Kherson Oblast | |
| Marine Corps Recruitment Center | | Mykolaiv, Mykolaiv Oblast | Director, Viktor Samokhin |
| Marine Corps Basic School | | Mykolaiv, Mykolaiv Oblast | |
| 67th Logistics Battalion | | Odesa | n/a |

=== 30th Marine Corps (Amphibious) ===
Created in 2024, this formation is composed of the active combat and combat support formations of the UkrMC.

XXX Amphibious Corps
| 34th Marine Brigade | А7053 | Kherson | Commander LTC Dmytro Ishchenko |
| 35th Marine Brigade: 18th Marine Battalion; 88th Marine Battalion; 137th Marine Battalion | А0216: А4210; А2613; А3821 | Dachne, Odesa Oblast: Sarata, Odesa Oblast; Bolhrad, Odesa Oblast; Dachne, Odesa Oblast | Commander Yuriy Andriyenko: n/a; Commander Oleksandr Kilafly; n/a |
| 36th Marine Brigade: 1st Marine Battalion; 501st Marine Battalion | A2802: А2777; А1965 | Mykolaiv, Mykolaiv Oblast: Mykolaiv, Mykolaiv Oblast; Berdiansk, Berdiansk Raion | Commander LTC Mykyta Vitek: Commander LTC Vladyslav Galkin; Commander Major Yaroslav Kryklyvy |
| 37th Marine Brigade: 505th Marine Battalion | A4548: A4635 | n/a: n/a | Commander COL Vitaliy Napkhanenko: Commander LTC Oleksandr Tonenchuk |
| 38th Marine Brigade: 503rd Marine Battalion | A4765: A1275 | n/a: Mariupol, Donetsk Oblast | Commander LTC Yevheniy Bova: Commander Denis Karnaushenko |
| 39th Marine Brigade | А7382 | Odesa | Commander LTC Dmytro Ishchenko |
| 40th Marine Brigade | A4935 | Volyn Oblast | Commander Lt. Col. Dmytro Ishchenko |
| 32nd Artillery Brigade | А1325 | Altestove, Odesa Oblast | Commander Volodymyr Mohylnyi |
| 406th Artillery Brigade: 66th Cannon Artillery Battalion; 67th Cannon Artillery Battalion; 65t Rocket Artillery Battalion; 64th Rocket Artillery Battalion | А2062: А2611; А1804; А3687; А4217 | Mykolaiv, Mykolaiv Oblast: Berdiansk, Zaporizhzhia Oblast; Ochakiv, Mykolaiv Oblast; Dachne, Odesa Oblast; Bilhorod-Dnistrovskyi, Odesa Oblast | Commander COL Andrij Šubin: Commander Yevhen Stroganov; Commander Oleksandr Krotov; n/a; n/a |
| 414th Unmanned Strike Aviation Brigade (OPCON Unmanned Systems Forces) | n/a | | Commander LTC Robert Brovdi |
| 15th Support Regiment | n/a | | |
| 7th Anti-Aircraft Divizion | А0350 | Ochakiv, Mykolaiv Oblast | n/a |
| 67th Logistics Battalion | | | n/a |
| 101st Anti-Aircraft Missile Divizion | | | n/a |
| 140th Reconnaissance Battalion | А0878 | Skadovsk, Kherson Oblast | Commander Oleksandr Straryna |
| 310th Electronic Warfare Regiment | | | n/a |
| 380th Reserve Marine Battalion | | | n/a |
| 426th Unmanned Systems Regiment | | Mykolaiv | n/a |

The 406th Marine Artillery Brigade consists of five artillery battalions equipped with towed M777, 2A36 Giatsint-B, D-20, and MT-12 Rapira howitzers. The 32nd Marine Artillery Brigade consists of four field artillery battalions equipped among others bwith Uragan and Bureviy multiple rocket launchers.

According to blogs, each marine infantry brigade is organized into the following:

- Headquarters and Service Company
- three to 5-6 marine battalions (one air assault capable)
  - HSC
  - 3-4 Marine rifle companies
  - Marine landing equipment/assault amphibhian company
  - Recon company
  - Sniper company
  - MANPADS company/platoon
  - mortar battery
- Marine Tank Battalion
- Marine Artillery Regiment
  - with a HQ and Service Battery, target acquisition unit, security company/battalion, recon and observer battery, either two self-propelled artillery battalions and an optional one or two towed field artillery battalion/s or two to three mixed artillery battalions, a rocket launcher artillery battalion and an anti-tank battalion (under regiment but otherwise under direct brigade control)
- Marine Air Defense Missile Artillery battalion/regiment
- Marine Brigade armored reconnaissance company/battalion
- Marine Brigade Force reconnaissance company
- Marine combat engineer battalion
- Marine logistics battalion
- Marine maintenance battalion
- Marine Unmanned aerial vehicle (UAV) company
- Marine signal company
- Marine air defense radar company
- medical company
- Military Police company/platoon
- CBRN defense company
- Marine Brigade Band

== Weapons and vehicular equipment ==
The UKRMC is equipped with the following vehicles:

- T-64, T-72, T-80, PT-91 Twardy main battle tanks in Marine Tank Battalions
- AMX-10 RC wheeled light tanks/armored reconnaissance vehicles in Marine Tank Battalions and Marine Reconnaissance
- FV101 Scorpion tracked light tanks/armored reconnaissance vehicles in Marine Tank Battalions and Marine Reconnaissance
- BMP-1, BMP-2, BMP-3 tracked infantry fighting vehicles in tracked Marine Battalions and Marine Assault Amphibian Companies/Battalions
- BTR-3, BTR-4, KTO Rosomak wheeled infantry fighting vehicles in wheeled Marine Battalions and Marine Assault Amphibian Companies/Battalions
- BTR-60, BTR-70, BTR-80, BTR-7, VAB, Patria Pasi wheeled armored personnel carriers in wheeled Marine Battalions and Marine Assault Amphibian Battalions
- MT-LB, PTS series (PTS-2 and PTS-3) and M113 tracked armored personnel carriers in tracked Marine Battalions and Marine Assault Amphibian Battalions
- Bandvagn 206 articulated tracked armored personnel carriers in tracked Marine Battalions
- BRDM-2 armored scout cars, some on tank destroyer configuration, in Marine Battalions and Marine Reconnaissance
- Bushmaster, Cougar, Mastiff, International MaxxPro, BMC Kirpi MRAPs in wheeled Marine Battalions, Marine Assault Amphibian Battalions and Marine Reconnaissance
- Humvees, GAZ Tiger, Roshel Senators, Varta, ATF Dingo and Novator armored cars and mobility vehicles in wheeled Marine Battalions, Marine Assault Amphibian Battalions and Marine Reconnaissance

It is also equipped with the following field artillery systems in the Marine Artillery Battalions:

- Maritime Brimstone precision strike missiles
- RK-360MC Neptune, Harpoon (MOBA) and RBS-17 Hellfire anti-ship missiles
- BM-21 Grad, BM-21 Verba, BM-27 Uragan, BM-27 Burevyi, M142 HIMARS, RM-70, S-8 multiple launch rocket systems
- 2S1 Gvozdika, 2S3 Akatsiya, 152mm SpGH DANA self-propelled artillery howitzers
- D-30, D-20, 2A65 Msta-B, 2A36 Giatsint-B, M114, M777, FH70, L119 towed howitzers
- 9K114 Shturm, 9M113 Konkurs, 2A29/MT-12 Rapira anti-tank guns
- 82 mm and 120 mm mortars

The 7th Marine Anti-Air Defense Missile Artillery Battalion and the seven brigade air defense artillery battalions/regiments are equipped with:

- 9K33 Osa, AN/TWQ-1 Avenger wheeled mobile anti-air defense short range surface-to-air missile launchers
- KS-30, AZP S-60, ZU-23-2, ZPU series towed or truck mounted short range anti-aircraft guns
