= 35th Marine Brigade =

Ukrainian military unit

- 35-а окрема бригада морської піхоти
- Sleeve patch of the Brigade
- Active: 24 May 2018 – present
- Country: Ukraine
- Branch: Ukrainian Marine Corps
- Type: Marine infantry
- Role: Marines
- Size: 2,000
- Garrison/HQ: Dachne, Odesa Oblast
- Patron: Mykhailo Ostrohradskyi
- Engagements: Russian invasion of Ukraine; 2022 Kherson counteroffensive; 2023 Ukrainian counteroffensive; Dniepr campaign
- Website: Facebook

Insignia
- Old unit patch (2018–2023)

- Old subdued patch (2018–2023)

- Flag (unofficial)

The 35th Marine Brigade named after Rear Admiral Mykhailo Ostrohradskyi (Ukrainian: 35-та окрема бригада морської піхоти імені контр-адмірала Михайла Остроградського, romanized: 35-ta okrema bryhada morskoi pikhoty imeni kontr-admirala Mykhaila Ostrohradskoho; unit number A0216), is a marine infantry brigade of the Ukrainian Marine Corps formed on 24 May 2018 in Dachne, Odesa Oblast.

== History ==
During a 2022 Ukrainian counteroffensive in the Kherson Oblast, units of the 35th Brigade crossed the Inhulets River on 2 October 2022, establishing a bridgehead, from which they captured the village of Davydiv Brid two days later on 4 October.

The 35th Marine Brigade participated in the 2023 Ukrainian counteroffensive. The unit formed part of the spearhead on the Velyka Novosilka front alongside the 25th Airborne and 68th Jaeger brigades, as well as two units of Territorial Defense. The 2,000 man strong brigade punched a hole in Russian lines liberating the village of Makarivka. Later the unit posted photos of its troops raising the Ukrainian flag over, and then posing in front of the municipal building of the village of Storozheve. Together with the 38th Marine Brigade, they liberated the village of Urozhaine on 16 August 2023.

On 1 November 2025, a Russian Iskander missile strike on a military base in Dnipropetrovsk Oblast hit an awards ceremony that commemorated the anniversary of one of the brigade's battalions. The losses were reported as at least twelve dead, thirty-six wounded, and six missing, including experienced drone pilots and soldiers. The Ukrainian State Bureau of Investigation opened a criminal investigation to see if air raid precautions were followed. The battalion's commander was charged with negligence on 3 November.

== Structure ==
- 35th Marine Brigade, A0216
  - 1st Marine Battalion
  - 2nd Marine Battalion
    - Amphibious Assault Company. Commander Bohdan "Dykiy".
    - FPV Drone Unit "Yokai"
  - 18th Separate Marine Battalion (18ОБМП, А4210)
    - 18th Amphibious Assault Company
    - FPV Drone Unit "Boar"
  - 88th Separate Marine Air Assault Battalion (А2613)
  - 137th Separate Marine Battalion (А3821)
    - Aerial Reconnaissance Unit "Hydra"
  - 2nd Marine Tank Battalion
  - 35th Marine Artillery Regiment
    - Headquarters and Target Acquisition Battery
    - 4th Marine Self-propelled Field Artillery Battalion (2S1 Gvozdika)
    - 5th Marine Rocket Launcher Artillery Battalion (BM-21 Grad)
    - 6th Marine Anti-tank Artillery Battalion (MT-12 Rapira)
    - 25th Marine Artillery Reconnaissance Battalion
    - Security Company
    - Engineer Company
    - Replacement and Maintenance Battery
    - Logistics Company
    - Signals Platoon
    - Chemical, Biological, Radiological and Nuclear Defense Platoon
  - 35th Marine Anti-Air Defense Artillery Battalion
  - 2nd Marine Combat Engineer Battalion
  - 2nd Marine Maintenance Battalion
  - 2nd Marine Logistics Battalion
  - 2nd Force Reconnaissance Company
  - Sniper Company
  - Electronic Warfare Company
  - Signals Company
  - Anti-Aircraft Radar Company
  - Chemical, Biological, Radiological and Nuclear Defense Company
  - Medical Company
  - Military Police Company
  - 35th Marine Brigade Band
