= 137th Marine Battalion =

Ukrainian military unit

137th Separate Marine Battalion
- 137-й окремий батальйон морської піхоти
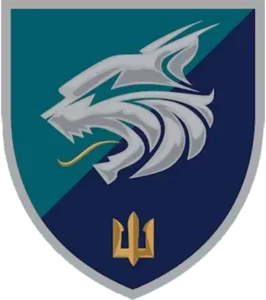
- Battalion Insignia
- Active: 2015-present
- Country: Ukraine
- Allegiance: Armed Forces of Ukraine
- Branch: Ukrainian Marine Corps
- Type: Battalion
- Role: Marines
- Part of: 35th Marine Brigade; HELBROC (international deployments)
- Garrison/HQ: Odessa
- Mottos: Latin: "Vi et armis" (By Force of Arms)
- Engagements: Russo-Ukrainian War: War in Donbas; 2022 Russian invasion of Ukraine
- Decorations: For Courage and Bravery

Insignia
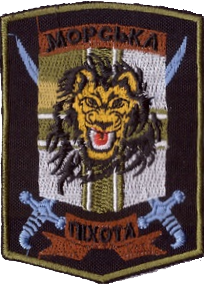
- Former Patch

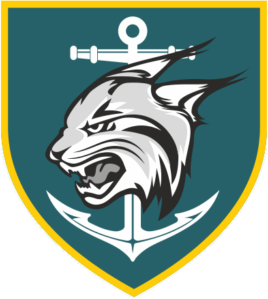
- Former Insignia

137th Separate Marine Battalion is a marine battalion of the 35th Marine Brigade. It was established in late 2015 as a part of the Ukrainian Navy but was transferred to the Ukrainian Marine Corps in 2018. Internationally, it's also a part of the Balkan Battlegroup of the European Union. It is headquartered at Dachne, Odesa Oblast.

== History ==
The battalion was established in November 2015. After establishment, it took part in training exercises in Chornomorske especially that of neutralizing sabotage and reconnaissance squads. In December 2015, the battalion, along with Ukrainian Naval Aviation and heavy artillery, conducted training in the Okny Raion at the border of Transnistria as a deterrent against any possible conflict with Transnistria.

The personnel of the battalion carried out patrols in the Exclusive Economic Zone near the Snake Island, inducted into the Balkan Battlegroup, and participate in the Exercise Sea Breeze and in February 2016, conducted training in Mykolaiv Oblast and Kherson Oblast including multi-kilometer marches, target protection, amphibious assault, sea crossing, landing, evacuations amongst others. In the spring and summer of 2016, the battalion's howitzer artillery underwent training in Mykolaiv Oblast and the battalion took part in the international exercises "Sea Breeze 2016". It received training from British and American instructors in military theory and the usage of unmanned aerial vehicles, respectively It took part in combat operations in Mariupol during 2016. The battalion also fought at the Shyrokyne standoff

On April 28, 2017, during a combat operation near the village of Pavlopil, a vehicle of the battalion was struck by a landmine although the personnel remained same and evacuated but one soldier (Oleksandr Olehovych Berdnyk) returned to retrieve the vehicle but was killed in another landmine blast. In mid-June 2017, Ihor Voronchenko conducted an inspection of the battalion's facilities in "Dachne-1" and "Dachne-2". On June 3, 2017, the battalion's positions near the village of Chermalyk were shelled by separatist forces killing a soldier (Mykhailo Oleksandrovych Kobets) of the battalion. On August 24, 2017, the President of Ukraine Petro Poroshenko, presented a Battle Flag to the battalion commander.

The battalion saw intensive combat in the village of Mykolaivka during which two soldiers of the battalion (Kozma Denys Petrovych and Sakal Ivan Volodymyrovych) were killed on 1 and 6 May 2019 respectively and another was wounded. On June 19, 2019, the villages of Mykolaivka and Novotroitske killing a soldier of the battalion (Oleksandr Ivanovych Lyashok).

On July 13, 2020, while performing combat operations in Zaytseve, a unit of the battalion was ambushed. The commander of the battalion's reconnaissance platoon (Krasnogrud Dmytro Anatoliyovych) was severely wounded in an explosion and later died. Nine soldiers came to retrieve his body but were ambushed by the Russians. The Russians indiscriminately attacked the medics of the battalion wearing white helmets. A medic of the battalion (Ilin Mykola) and another soldier (Yaroslav Serhiyovych Zhuravel) were killed during the ambush and several more were wounded who were later returned after negotiations with the separatists.

In early 2022, during the Russo-Ukrainian war, several units from the battalion carried combat operations on a 200 km stretch in southern Ukraine. One platoon was stationed near Chonhar Bridge, one at Kalanchak and one near the village of Kairy and they were the first to encounter Russian troops during the Southern Ukraine campaign. The battalion saw combat in Kherson Oblast during which a soldier of the battalion (Mykhailo Mykolayovych Kravchuk) was killed on March 18, 2022 and another soldier of the battalion (Oleksandr Sosyedkin), was killed on September 14, 2022, during the 2022 Kherson counteroffensive. It also saw action in the Zaporizhzhia Oblast where the commander of the battalion's air assault battalion (Berdnyk Ivan Igorovych) was killed in combat on April 11, 2022.

The battalion took part in the Battle of Vuhledar. On June 13, 2023, the battalion was involved in the liberation of the village of Makarivka as a part of the 2023 Ukrainian counteroffensive.

In March 2024, the battalion was deployed to the left Bank of the Kherson Oblast, and was highly successful in destroying Russian equipment by using FPV drones.

== Structure ==
- Management & HQ
- Amphibious Assault Company
- 1st Marine Company
- 2nd Marine Company
- Fire Support Company
- Anti-tank Artillery battery
- Mortar battery
- Anti-aircraft missile platoon
- Guardian company
- Aerial Reconnaissance company "Hydra"
- Engineering vehicle platoon
- IT platoon
- Medical center

== Commanders ==
- Rodion Klepchenko (2015–2017)
- Andrii Fedichev (2017–2020)
- Vadym Rymarenko (2020–2022) (WIA)

== Equipment ==
- BTR-60 - an unknown number of vehicles
- 122 mm howitzer 2A18 (D-30) - At least five artillery pieces
