= 88th Marine Air Assault Battalion (Ukraine) =

88th Separate Marine Air Assault Battalion 88th Separate Amphibious Assault Bat'n (2016-18) 88th Separate Aeromobile Battalion (2012-2016) 12th Separate Mechanized Brigade (2010-2012) 1st Aeromobile Division (1993-2003) 98th Guards Airborne Division (-1993)
- 88-й окремий батальйон морської піхоти
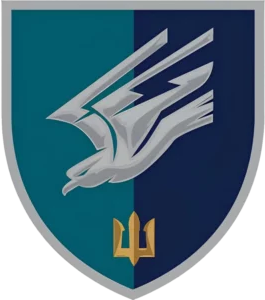
- Battalion Insignia
- Active: 1993-2003; 2010-present
- Country: Ukraine
- Branch: Ukrainian Marine Corps
- Type: Marines
- Role: Naval infantry
- Size: Battalion
- Part of: 35th Marine Brigade
- Garrison/HQ: Bolhrad
- Motto: "We are where we are needed"
- Engagements: Russo-Ukrainian War: War in Donbas; 2022 Russian invasion of Ukraine
- Decorations: For Courage and Bravery

Insignia
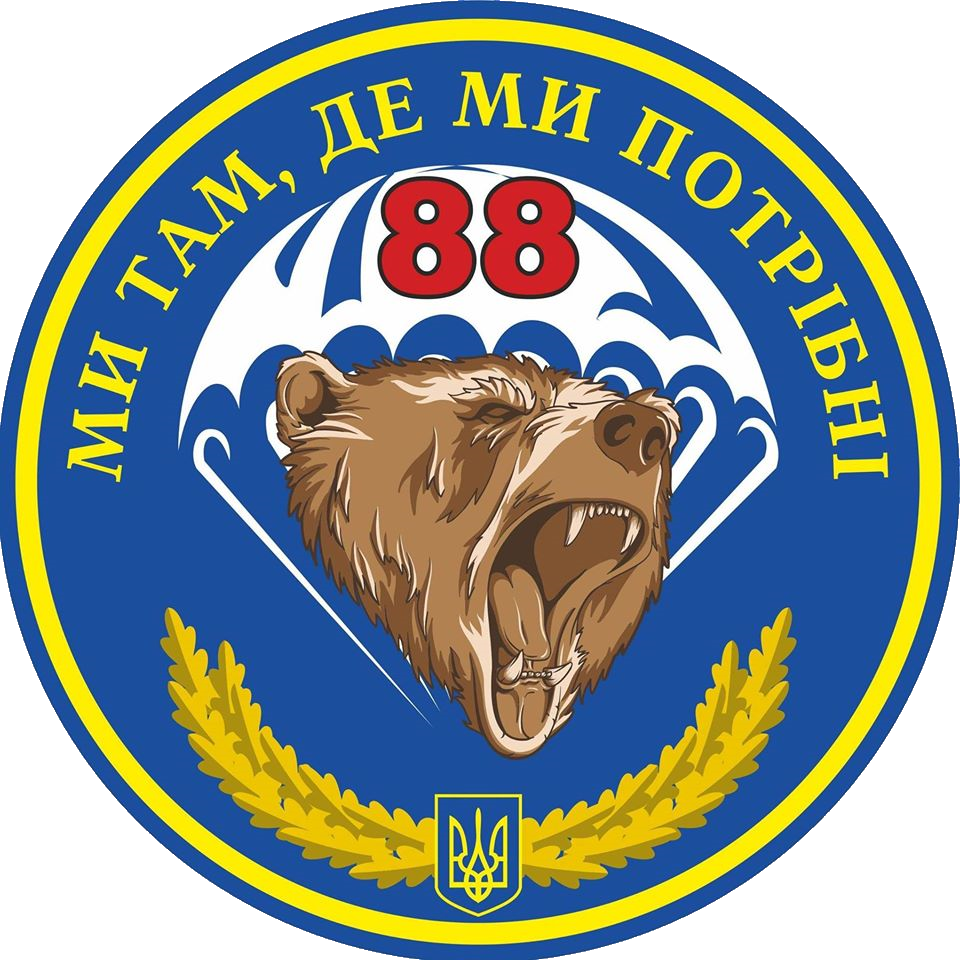
- Former Insignia

The 88th Separate Marine Air Assault Battalion is marine air assault battalion of the 35th Marine Brigade of the Ukrainian Marine Corps tracing its origins to the Soviet 98th Airborne Division. It is an amphibious assault and heliborne unit capable of performing combat operations from the sea, air and land. It is based at the city of Bolhrad in Odessa Oblast.

== History ==
The battalion traces its origins to the 98th Guards Airborne Division, stationed in Bolgrad during Soviet era. In 1993, it was reformed into the 1st Aeromobile Division, being disband in 2003. However, on 1 October 2010, the 12th Mechanized Brigade's formation started in Bolgrad. A headquarters and a support company were established and repairs of the abandoned base were initiated including repairs of housing facilities, training and logistical bases as well as an airstrip. Soon elements of the 51 separate mechanized brigades and a unit of the 79th Airmobile Brigade were inducted into newly formed unit with Major Oleksandr Lutsenko becoming its first commander.

In December 2012, the 12th Separate Mechanized Brigade was merged into the 79th Aeromobile Brigade becoming its 88th Separate Aeromobile Battalion.

The battalion participated in the War in Donbass with the first deployment being in May 2014.

In September 2016, the battalion was reformed into the 88th Separate Amphibious Assault Battalion.

On August 24, 2017, the president of Ukraine Petro Poroshenko presented the 88th Separate Airborne Assault Battalion with a battle flag. which was taken to its headquarters on September 5.

In November 2018, the battalion was transferred to the newly created 35th Marine Brigade becoming the 88th Separate Marine Battalion.

During 2019–2020, many of the personnel of the battalion were trained by the United Kingdom as a part of Operation Orbital.

In 2021, the battalion took part in several international exercises including Warrior Watcher, Riverine, Agile Spirit and Sea Breeze.

The battalion saw intensive action during the Russo-Ukrainian war. It was involved in the capture of the Snake Island as a part of the Snake Island campaign and was later tasked with protecting the island from any future Russian assault. It was involved in the protection of Odessa from Russian attacks on the city. The battalion took part in the 2022 Kherson counteroffensive, and in particular the recapture of Davydiv Brid. From November 2022 to May 2023, the battalion took part in the Battle of Avdiivka. Starting from June to September 2023, the battalion fought in the Zaporizhzhia Oblast as a part of the 2023 Ukrainian counteroffensive. On July 2, 2023, the battalion was awarded the honorary award "For Courage and Bravery". It also saw combat in Markivka Raion where a soldier of the battalion (Yury Oleksandrovych) was killed in action while attempting to assault Russian positions. Then it was deployed to the Volnovakha Raion of Donetsk Oblast and captured the settlements of Storozheve, Staromaiorske and Urozhaine. In May 2024, it was deployed to Kherson Oblast and is currently taking part in the Dnieper campaign.

== Structure ==
- 1st Amphibious Assault Company
- 2 Amphibious Assault Company
- 3rd Amphibious Assault Company
- Fire Support Company
- Mortar battery
- Howitzer battery
- Anti-aircraft Artillery Platoon
- Anti-aircraft missile platoon
- Reconnaissance platoon
- Sniper platoon
- Communications department
- Engineering and Technical platoon
- Headquarters platoon
- UAV department
- Medical center

== Commanders ==
- Major Oleksandr Lutsenko (2010–2017)
- Lt. Col. Oleksandr Dmytrovych Kilafly (2017-)

== Sources ==
- «ВДВ завжди там, де найважче!» — Міністр оборони України нагородив десантників 88 одшб ВДВ
- Міністр оборони України вивчив стан справ на військовому аеродромі у Болграді та відвідав розташування 88-го одшб ВДВ
- "Морські піхотинці отримали партію бронеавтомобілів Варта". uprom.info/. 2019-02-22. Archived from the original on 23 February 2019.
