= 37th Marine Brigade =

Ukrainian military unit

- 37 окрема бригада морської піхоти
- Sleeve patch of the Brigade
- Active: January 12, 2023 – present
- Country: Ukraine
- Branch: Ukrainian Marine Corps
- Role: Light Infantry
- Size: 1,200-1,500
- Engagements: Russian invasion of Ukraine; 2023 Ukrainian counteroffensive
- Website: Facebook

Commanders
- Current commander: Vitaliy Napkhanenko

Insignia
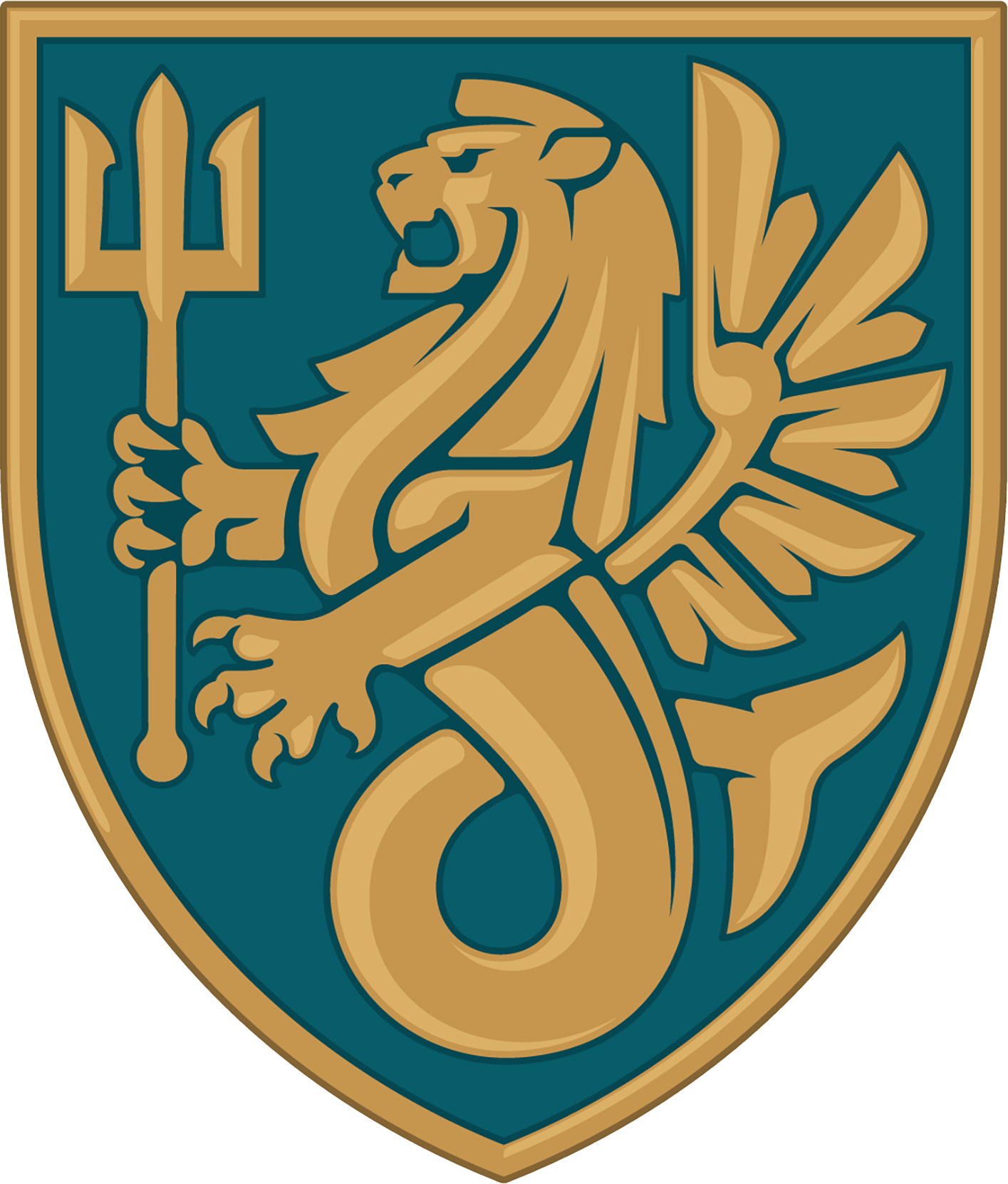
- Old unit patch (Feb 2023 - Jul 2023)

- Flag

The 37th Marine Brigade (Ukrainian: 37-ма окрема бригада морської піхоти, romanized: 37-ma okrema bryhada mors'koyi pikhoty; 37 ОБрМП, MUN A0216), is a naval infantry brigade of the Ukrainian Marine Corps of the Armed Forces of Ukraine. The brigade was part of the Ukrainian Navy until May 23, 2023.

== History ==
The brigade was formed on January 12, 2023, as part of an expansion of the Ukrainian Naval Infantry, which also saw the creation of four other new marine brigades. The 37th was established from a battalion of the 79th Air Assault Brigade and veteran officers from the 36th Marine Brigade. The unit has been outfitted with a mix of both new western-supplied equipment and old soviet stockpiles. This includes Canadian Roshel Senators, British Mastiffs, French AMX-10 RCs, and old soviet towed artillery and small arms.

The unit was first reported in active combat in Novodonetske, a front-line settlement in the southern Donetsk Oblast. It engaged the DNR Militia's Vostok Battalion on June 3. Without armored support, the Brigade used an intricate web of artillery cover fire to move its troop transports to attack positions close to Russian forces, then returned beyond Russian artillery range. During the opening of the 2023 Ukrainian counteroffensive, the unit advanced slowly and consistently in the region.

Since the 36th Marine Brigade originated as a loyal Ukrainian element during the Russian occupation of Crimea, Western media have speculated that the Ukrainian Armed Forces intend to use the 37th—as well as the other four other new marine brigades—to launch a naval invasion of the Crimean peninsula, should southern Donetsk and Zaporizhzhia Oblasts be liberated.

== Structure ==
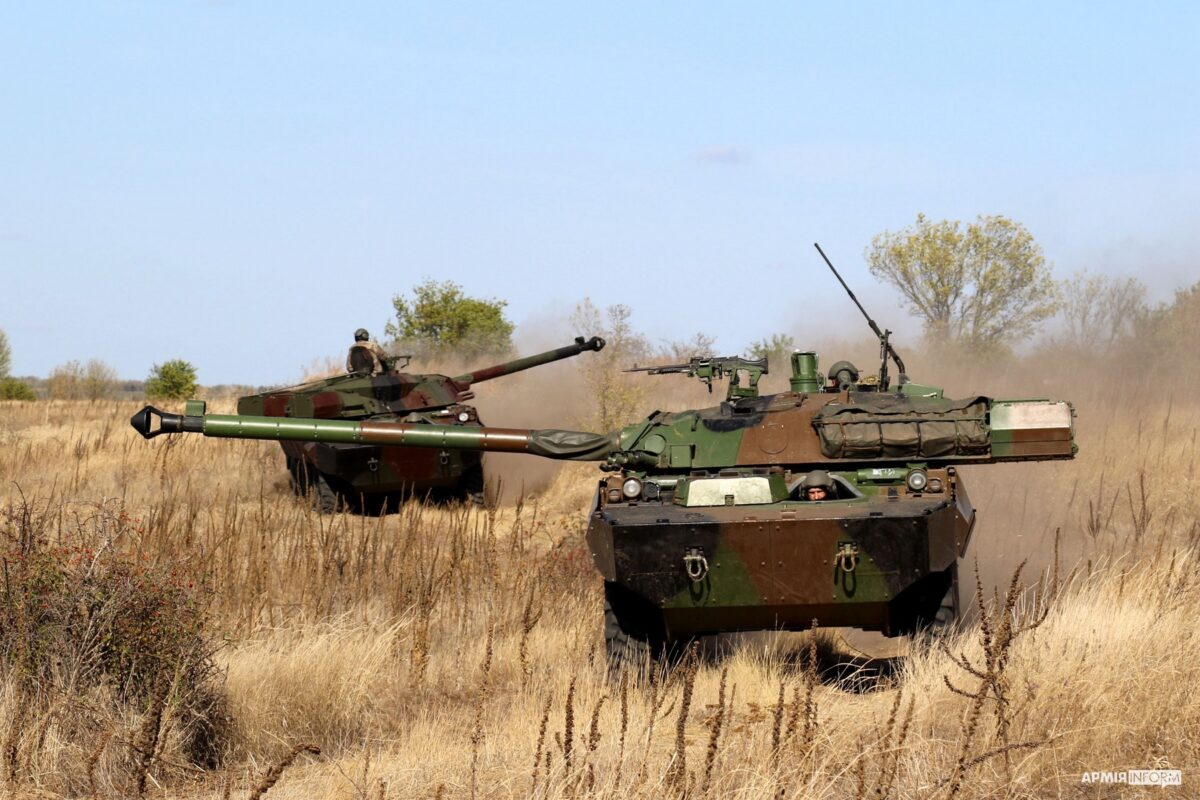
AMX-10 RC of Ukrainian 37th Marine Brigade, 15 October 2023.

- 37th Marine Brigade (37 ОБрМП A4548). Commander Vitaliy Napkhanenko
  - Headquarters & Services Company
  - 1st Marine Battalion (AMX-10 RC)
    - Airborne Assault Company
    - Fire Support Company
  - 2nd Marine Battalion
    - Airborne Assault Company
    - Fire Support Company
  - 505th Separate Marine Infantry Battalion (505 ОБМП A4635). Formed on February 28, 2023. Commander Lt. Col. Oleksandr Tonenchuk
  - Tank Battalion (AMX-10 RC).
  - Brigade Artillery Group (M109 howitzer, 2S1 Gvozdika)
    - HQ and Artillery Reconnaissance Battery
    - 1st Self-propelled Artillery Division, 1st SADn (122mm D30 howitzer)
    - Marine Anti-tank Artillery Division (ПТРК 37 ОБрМП) (MT-12 Rapira)
  - Anti-Air Defense Missile Artillery Battalion
  - Reconnaissance Company
    - FPV Drone Unit
  - Sniper Company
  - Electronic Warfare Company
  - Signals Company
  - Anti-Aircraft Radar Company
  - Security Company
  - Engineer Company
  - Replacement and Maintenance Battery
  - Logistics Company
  - CBRN-defense Chemical, biological, radiological and nuclear Company
  - Medical Company
  - Military Police Company
  - 37th Marine Brigade Band
