= Dachne rural hromada =

Coordinates: 46°37′23.855″N 30°32′20.119″E

Dachne rural hromada Дачненська сільська громада
- Hromada
- Interactive map of Dachne rural hromada
- Country: Ukraine
- Oblast: Odesa Oblast
- Raion: Odesa Raion
- Admin. center: Dachne

Area
  - Total: 175.0 km^{2} (67.6 sq mi)

Population (2020)
  - Total: 10,513
  - Density: 60.07/km^{2} (155.6/sq mi)
- CATOTTG code: UA51100150000090671
- Settlements: 8
- Villages: 8

Dachne rural hromada (Ukrainian: Дачненська сільська громада) is a hromada in Odesa Raion of Odesa Oblast in southwestern Ukraine. Population: 10,513 (2020 est.)

The hromada consists of 8 villages:

- Bolharka
- Dachne (seat of administration)
- Yehorivka
- Yelyzavetivka
- Male
- Odradove
- Svitlohirske
- Khomynka

== Links ==
- https://decentralization.gov.ua/newgromada/4329#
- картка Постанови ВР
