= 18th Anti-Tank Battalion (Ukraine) =

18th Anti-Tank Battalion 18th Marine Battalion (2018-2025) 18th Motorized Infantry Battalion (2014-18) 18th Territorial Defense Battalion (2014)
- 18-й окремий протитанковий батальйон
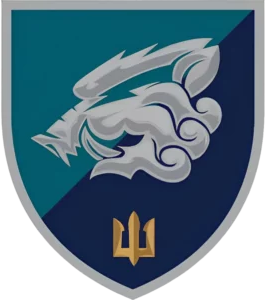
- Active: 2014-present
- Country: Ukraine
- Branch: Ukrainian Marine Corps
- Type: Marines
- Role: Anti-tank warfare
- Size: Battalion
- Part of: 30th Marine Corps
- Garrison/HQ: Sarata, Odesa Oblast
- Motto: There are no obstacles for us
- Engagements: Russo-Ukrainian War: War in Donbas; Full scale invasion
- Decorations: For Courage and Bravery

Commanders
- Current commander: Major Dmytro Veretennikov

Insignia
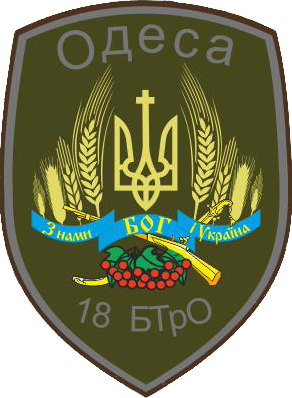
- Former Insignia

The 18th Separate Anti-Tank Battalion (MUN A4210) is a marine battalion of the Ukrainian Marine Corps and was formerly attached to the 28th Mechanized Brigade. It was initially established as the 18th Territorial Defense Battalion, a volunteer formation based at Odessa, eventually becoming a permanent formation of the Marine Corps.

== History ==
It was initially established as the 18th Territorial Defense Battalion in Odessa Oblast in May 2014 with the head of the Odessa state administration Volodymyr Nemyrovskyi leading its formation.

On May 30, 2014, the newly appointed head of Odessa State Administration Ihor Palytsia and the commander of the Operational Command South, Lieutenant General Anatoliy Syrotenko presented a battle flag to the battalion. It was also informed to the press that the battalion wasn't a temporary unit as they're not given combat flags. A reserve officer and former commander of an Airmobile Brigade was appointed as the commander although his name wasn't disclosed.

420 soldiers and officers were enrolled into the battalion. The deputy military commissar of the Odesa region started that only volunteers were to join the battalion.

Colonel Yury Piskun reported that the standard weapons of the battalion included pistols, submachine guns, machine guns and grenade launchers and that the personnel were being trained at the Training Center of the Odessa Military Academy. On 2 September 2014, 420 armored vests were purchased from the battalion at the personal expense of Ihor Palytsia. In September 2014 it was redeployed to Mariupol and started facing financial and logistical problems, which were resolved by charity.

In June 2014, the battalion equipped with 18 armored personnel carriers was sent to strengthen the defense at the border of Transnistria with the base of deployment being Rozdilna Raion.

In mid September 2014, it was transferred to Donetsk Oblast to reinforce the Mariupol garrison. The battalion began operations at two checkpoints at the outskirts of northern Mariupol building dugouts and other fortifications. Their posts were shelled on 18 October 2014, killing four soldiers of the battalion (Yevhen Volodymyrovych Kravets, Boychenko Hennadiy Vasylyovych, Mykola Valeryovich Mokan, and Oleksandr Ivanovych Orlyk). In November 2014, the battalion was reformed into the 18th Separate Motorized Infantry Battalion of the 28th Mechanized Brigade.

On November 4, 2014, a soldier of the brigade (Mykhailo Viktorovych Sviatkovsky) was killed in action while on a combat operational duty in the village of Pavlopil.

The battalion took part in the battle for Hnutove providing support and reinforcement to protect a Platoon base during which a soldier of the battalion (Agapiy Ivan Ivanovich) was killed in combat on March 20, 2015.

From May 18 to November 11, 2015, the battalion took part in the battle for Stanytsia Luhansk.

The battalion took part in a battle near the village of Kremenivka during which a Platoon commander of the battalion (Ihor Viktorovych Hetmanchuk) was killed in action on December 20, 2015.

On May 18, 2016, a soldier of the battalion (Dus Ivan Petrovych) was hit by sniper fire near Malinove coming from Hristovo and was killed in action.

The battalion took part in combat operations near Krasnohorivka and on September 9, 2017, a soldier of the battalion (Maksym Ihorovych Krivydenko) was killed as a result of shelling.

In 2018, the battalion became a part of the 35th Marine Brigade becoming the 18th Separate Marine Battalion.

The battalion took part in combat operations in the village of Hranitne and on April 11, 2019, an ATGM attack at the brigade's position left six soldiers of the battalion wounded and one soldier (Lysakivsky Volodymyr Yuriyovych) killed in action.

The battalion's commander (Derduga Serhii Mykolayovych) was killed in Mykolaiv Oblast during the Russian invasion of Ukraine during a battle near the village of Velyke Artakove.

The battalion took part in the 2022 Kherson counteroffensive and three personnel of the battalion (Bohdan Omelyanovich Pasterkevich, (Note: BMP division commander) Lepekha Vadim Vasyliovych (Note: Airborne platoon commander) and Volodymyr Kreminsky) were killed in action.

On 23 March 2023 the unit was awarded the honorary award For Courage and Bravery by the President of Ukraine Volodymyr Zelenskyy.

In late 2025 the unit was reorganized into the first dedicated marine anti-tank unit. The 18th Marine Battalion therefore becoming the 18th Anti-Tank Battalion.

== Commanders ==
- Derduga Serhii Mykolayovych † (2018–2022)

== Autonomous Units ==
- 18th Amphibious Assault Company
- FPV Drone Unit "Boar"

== Sources ==
- Одеський батальйон тероборони: хто нас захищає
- M. Zhirokhov, Одеський характер: 18-й батальйон тероборони
- "Бійці батальйону разом з технікою прибули на місце постійної дислокації до смт Сарата". world-of-sarata.at.ua/. Сарата. 2018-01-21. Archived from the original on 10 April 2018.
- 18 батальйону територіальної оборони передали 420 бронежилетів on YouTube
- Батальон територіальної оборони на Одещині. on YouTube
- «Південні кордони. Між невизнаною та окупованою»: Батальйон 18 on YouTube
- Примари 2 рота 18 ОМПБ 28 ОМБр // 16 April 2016
- 2 рота 18 ОМПБ 28 ОМБр, 2015—2016 р. // 18 April 2017
