= Ihor Palytsia =

Ukrainian businessman and politician

- Ігор Палиця
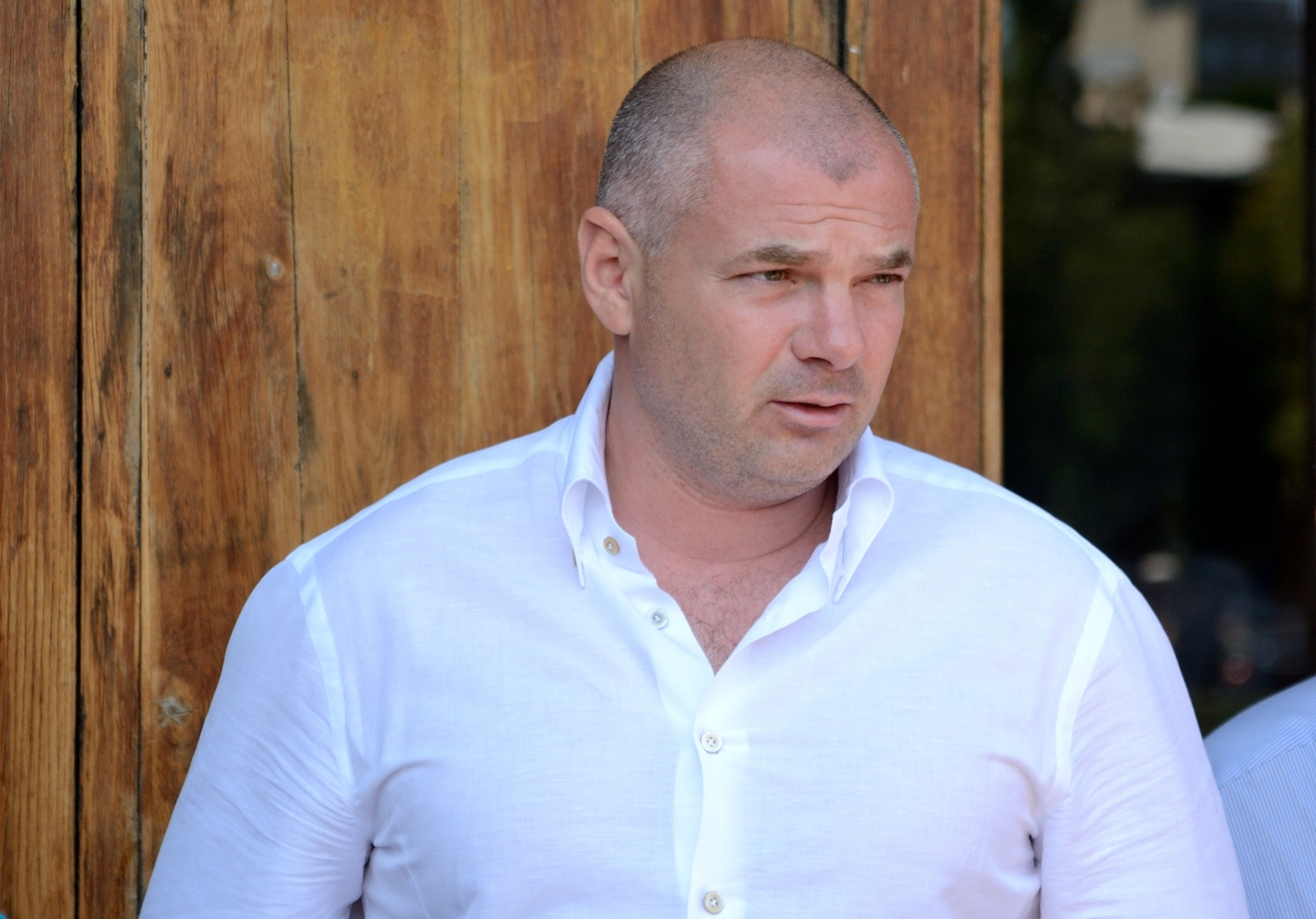
- Palytsia in 2014

Member of the Verkhovna Rada
- Incumbent
- Assumed office 29 August 2019

Chairman of the Volyn Oblast Council
- In office 26 November 2015 – 26 July 2019
- Preceded by: Valentyn Viter
- Succeeded by: Iryna Vakhovych

9th Governor of Odesa Oblast
- In office 6 May 2014 – 30 May 2015
- President: Oleksandr Turchynov (acting); Petro Poroshenko
- Prime Minister: Arseniy Yatsenyuk; Volodymyr Groysman (acting); Arseniy Yatsenyuk
- Preceded by: Volodymyr Nemyrovsky
- Succeeded by: Mikheil Saakashvili

Member of the Verkhovna Rada
- In office 23 November 2007 – 6 May 2014

Personal details
- Born: December 10, 1972 (age 53) Lutsk, Ukrainian SSR, Soviet Union
- Party: UKROP (2015-2020); For the Future (since 2020)
- Children: Mariia Palytsia, Zakhar Palytsia

Ihor Petrovych Palytsia (Ukrainian: Ігор Петрович Палиця; born 10 December 1972) is a Ukrainian businessman and politician. From May 2014 until May 2015 he worked as Governor of Odesa Oblast. In November 2015 Palytsia was elected chairman of the Volyn Oblast regional parliament. In the July 2019 Ukrainian parliamentary election Palytsia won a seat as an independent candidate. In parliament he joined the For the Future faction.

== Biography ==
Palytsia was born 10 December 1972 in Lutsk. In 1994, he graduated from the Lesya Ukrainka Volyn National University in his place of birth. Since 1993 he has been a businessman and he was a board member of (the national oil and gas company of Ukraine) Naftogaz from 2003 till 2007. Palytsia unsuccessfully took part in the 2006 Ukrainian parliamentary election for the Peasant Party of Ukraine. The party won 0,31% of the votes.

In the 2007 Ukrainian parliamentary election Palytsia was elected MP (as #68 on the party list) of Our Ukraine–People's Self-Defense Bloc. In the 2012 Ukrainian parliamentary election he was elected with 40.27% of the votes in simple-majority constituency #22 (situated in Lutsk) as a non-party affiliate. He did not enter any faction in the Verkhovna Rada (parliament).

Palytsia was appointed by Ukrainian President Petro Poroshenko Governor of Odesa Oblast on 6 May 2014, 4 days after the 2 May 2014 Odesa clashes that killed more than 40 people.

In the 2014 Ukrainian parliamentary election Palytsia was again re-elected into parliament; this time after placing 34th on the electoral list of Petro Poroshenko Bloc. He stayed on as Governor till 30 May 2015 when President Poroshenko appointed Mikheil Saakashvili Governor of Odesa Oblast.

In July 2015 Palytsia became a member of the political council of the party UKROP. On 26 November 2015 he was elected chairman of the Volyn Oblast regional parliament.

In the July 2019 Ukrainian parliamentary election Palytsia won a seat as an independent candidate. In parliament he joined the For the Future faction. May 2020 Palytsia was elected chairman of the For the Future party. According to Palytsia For the Future is de facto a continuation of UKROP.

== Political image ==
In the spring of 2014, the Ukrainian press mentioned Palytsia as being close to Ukrainian oligarch (and then fellow Governor of Dnipropetrovsk Oblast) Ihor Kolomoyskyi. He was a key figure in providing financial backing for the establishment of 18th Marine Bataillon providing equipment to it on a personal expense. In August 2021 Ukrainska Pravda reported that Palytsia and Kolomoyskyi no longer shared business assets.

== Awards ==
- Honored Economist of Ukraine (September 2004)
- Order of Merit, 3rd class (January 2009)
- Recipient of the Yevhen Chykalenko Prize (October 2013)
