= 505th Marine Battalion (Ukraine) =

505th Separate Marine Battalion
- 505-й окремий батальйон морської піхоти
- Battalion insignia
- Active: 2023-present
- Country: Ukraine
- Branch: Ukrainian Marine Corps
- Type: Battalion
- Role: Naval infantry
- Part of: 37th Marine Brigade
- Engagements: Russian-Ukrainian War: 2022 Russian Invasion of Ukraine
- Decorations: For Courage and Bravery

Insignia
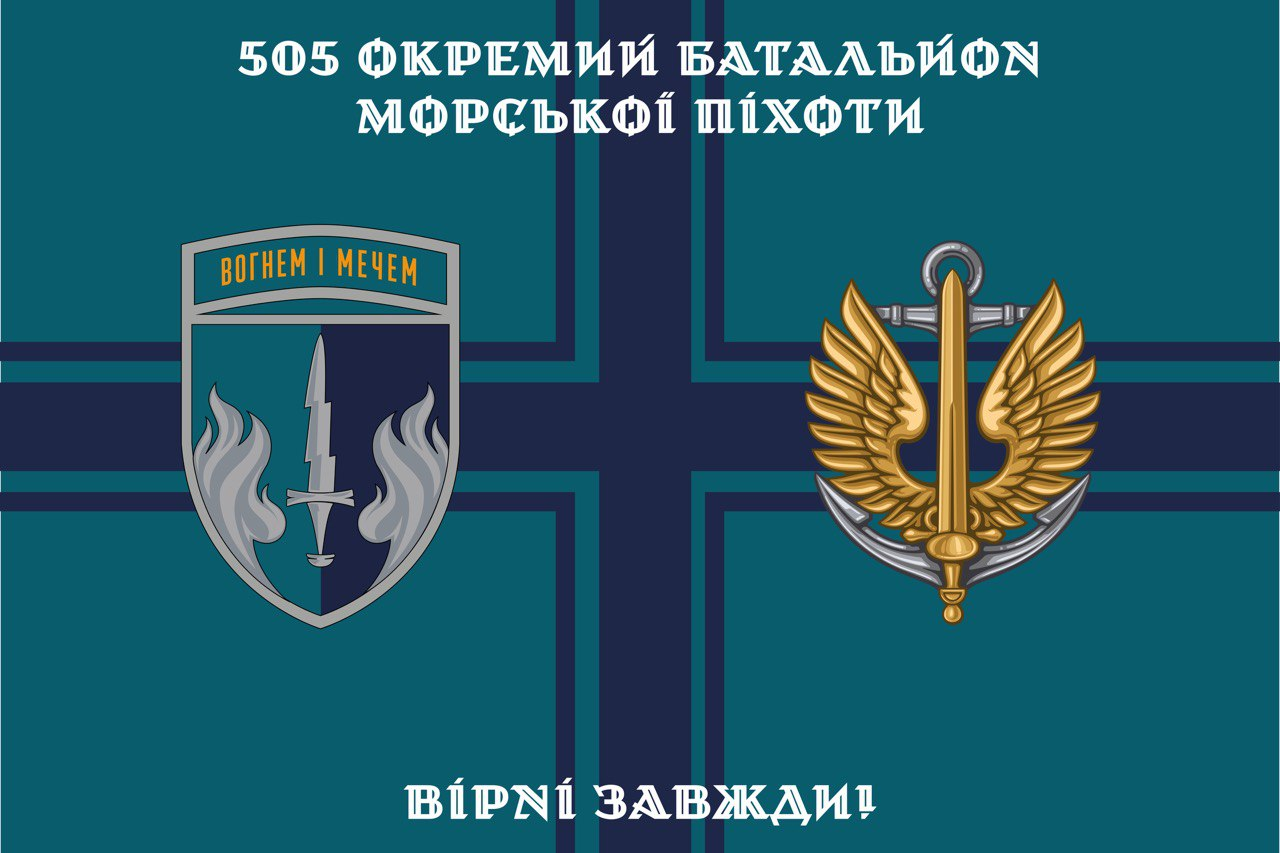
- Flag

The 505th Separate Marine Battalion (MUN А4635) is a part of the 37th Marine Brigade within the 30th Marine Corps.

The battalion was formed from the 64th Separate Cannon Artillery Division of A4217 military unit of the 406th Separate Artillery Brigade, named after Cornet General Oleksa Almaziv.

== History ==
The battalion was established based on the Directive of the Ministry of Defense of Ukraine and the Commander-in-Chief of the Armed Forces of Ukraine, and the order of the Command of the Naval Forces of the Armed Forces of Ukraine on February 28, 2023.

The unit comprised veterans of the marines, Air Assault troops, special operations forces, the International Defense Legion of Ukraine, and other units of the Navy and the Ground Forces.

Colonel Tonenchuk Oleksandr, a marine veteran, became the first commander of the battalion. Later, Lieutenant Colonel Serhiy Shatalov, a veteran of the marine corps, was appointed as the battalion commander. As of October 2024, the commander of the 505 SMB is Serhiy Oprya.

=== Russian invasion of Ukraine ===
From the end of April 2023, the fighters of the battalion performed combat missions in the Donetsk region, among them in May – in the Avdiivka city.

In June 2023, during the summer counteroffensive, the battalion actively participated in battles in the southern part of the Donetsk region. They conducted missions near the Zolota Nyva settlement and took part in the storming of Novodonetske village on 05.06.2023, followed by the liberation of the village of Urozhayne. In September 2023, the battalion was engaged in combat missions in Krasnohorivka city in the Donetsk region.

From November 30, 2023, to May 18, 2024, the battalion's soldiers established and maintained a bridgehead on the left bank of the Dnipro river in the Krynky village, located in the Kherson region.

In July 2025, it was reported that the battalion was operating on the border of the Dnipropetrovsk region and the Donetsk region.

== Weaponry ==
The battalion is equipped with the following:

- Mastiff PPV;
- BMC Kirpi;
- HMMWV;
- AMX-10 RC;
- PZD machine gun;
- 60-mm mortar KLP-60.

In addition, the battalion is supplied with other weapons that adhere to NATO standards. The battalion's equipment is regularly updated and replenished.

505 SMB has received support from various organizations including the Serhiy Prytula Charity Foundation, NFO “Come back alive”, the NAFO community, the Help99 charity fund, the iPay.ua online platform, and the MK Foundation. In the summer of 2024, the battalion received a batch of drones through the "ATLAS" collection in collaboration with "UNITED24" and "Monobank."

With the support of blogger and activist Serhii Sternenko and the Kurgan&Agregat band, the battalion received FPV drones.

The Kryvorizka regional military administration, Nabat Kryvbas NGO, Why so Charitable Foundation, Myloserdya Viktor Foundation, Hardened Hearts NGO, OPTYVITA UKRAINE Foundation, Charitable Foundation the Southern Guard Foundation, the NGO "People's Self-Defense of Lviv Region," and the "IT FOR THE VICTORY" charitable foundation helped provide the battalion with vehicles.

== Recruitment and training ==
The fighters of the 505th SMB undergo continuous training, starting from basic training and coordination within the unit, to overseas training according to NATO standards. Both recruits and military personnel already performing combat tasks receive training.

Before joining the battalion, all recruits undergo a standard introductory military training course at the Navy training center. Experienced instructors with combat experience teach them the basic rules of handling weapons, combat tactics, and tactical medicine. Additionally, the future soldiers of the 505th SMB undergo emotional hardening, training in discipline, moral stability, and physical endurance.

Following this, the fighters undergo additional training in the battalion and coordinate with the unit they will serve.

Prospective recruits can join a unit by responding to an existing vacancy, for example, on LobbyX, or by contacting the unit directly to receive a letter of recommendation for priority service in the battalion.

== Leadership ==
- Oleksandr Tonenchuk, colonel, former battalion commander
- Serhii Shatalov, lieutenant colonel, former battalion commander
- Serhii Oprya, major, and the current battalion commander

The current battalion commander, Major Serhii Oprya, obtained his higher education at the National Academy of Ground Forces named after Hetman Petro Sahaidachniy. From 2015 to 2017, he carried out combat tasks as part of the anti-terrorist operation and was involved in defending the village of Shyrokyne in the Donetsk region.

Following the start of the full-scale invasion, he led the Air Assault company of a separate brigade of marines and took part in defense operations in Mykolaiv. During the Battle of Krynky, he was involved in the crossing of combat units and the assault on Russian positions.

== Traditions ==
The Marine tradition involves completing a psychological obstacle course to earn the right to wear a navy beret. Ukrainian Marines' training program includes a seven-kilometer obstacle course, which is uniform for all units. During this course, servicemen conquer various obstacles — the psychological aspect of the course is paramount, as it tests will, endurance, stability, and the support of fellow soldiers in challenging situations, determining the right to wear a navy beret.

The 505th battalion has a tradition of awarding sleeve badges in a mysterious setting. These sleeve badges are given to soldiers who have completed enhanced training and combat coordination. The ceremony is conducted with torches, ancient Scandinavian rhythms, and the display of Marine Corps and battalion flags. This event serves as an initiation, welcoming new fighters into a community.

=== Symbols ===
The insignia for ceremonial and casual uniforms consists of a heraldic shield stretched on a field of sea waves and a dark blue field decorated with silver edging.

Along the shield's dividing line is a silver-stylized lightning sword accompanied on both sides by silver tongues of flame.

A sword with a blade in the form of lightning and tongues of flame symbolize speed, energy, power, and the power of retribution.

In the mountain above the shield is a blue-green ribbon with a silver edging and a golden inscription: "WITH FIRE AND SWORD". The sleeve badge is made in the Marine Corps of the Armed Forces of Ukraine colors.

== Awards ==
On May 23, 2024, by the Decree of the President of Ukraine Volodymyr Zelenskyy, the 505th Separate Marine Battalion of the Armed Forces of Ukraine, was awarded the Battle Flag and the "For Courage and Bravery" medal.

== International cooperatio ==
Former battalion commanders Colonel Tonenchuk Oleksandr and Lieutenant Colonel Shatalov Serhiy studied at the Naval War College of the US Navy in the United States.

Fighters of the 505th SMB continuously train according to NATO standards in Poland, Great Britain, Norway, the Netherlands, Germany, the Czech Republic, Spain, Lithuania, Latvia and Estonia.

These studies are multidisciplinary and cover several disciplines.

For example, in the Netherlands, the fighters were trained in water combat; in Italy, in parachuting from a helicopter; in Poland, they practiced storming enemy positions; in Germany, in military equipment maintenance; and in Great Britain, they went through a moral and psychological obstacle course.
