= Novator (light armoured vehicle) =

Ukrainian armored vehicle

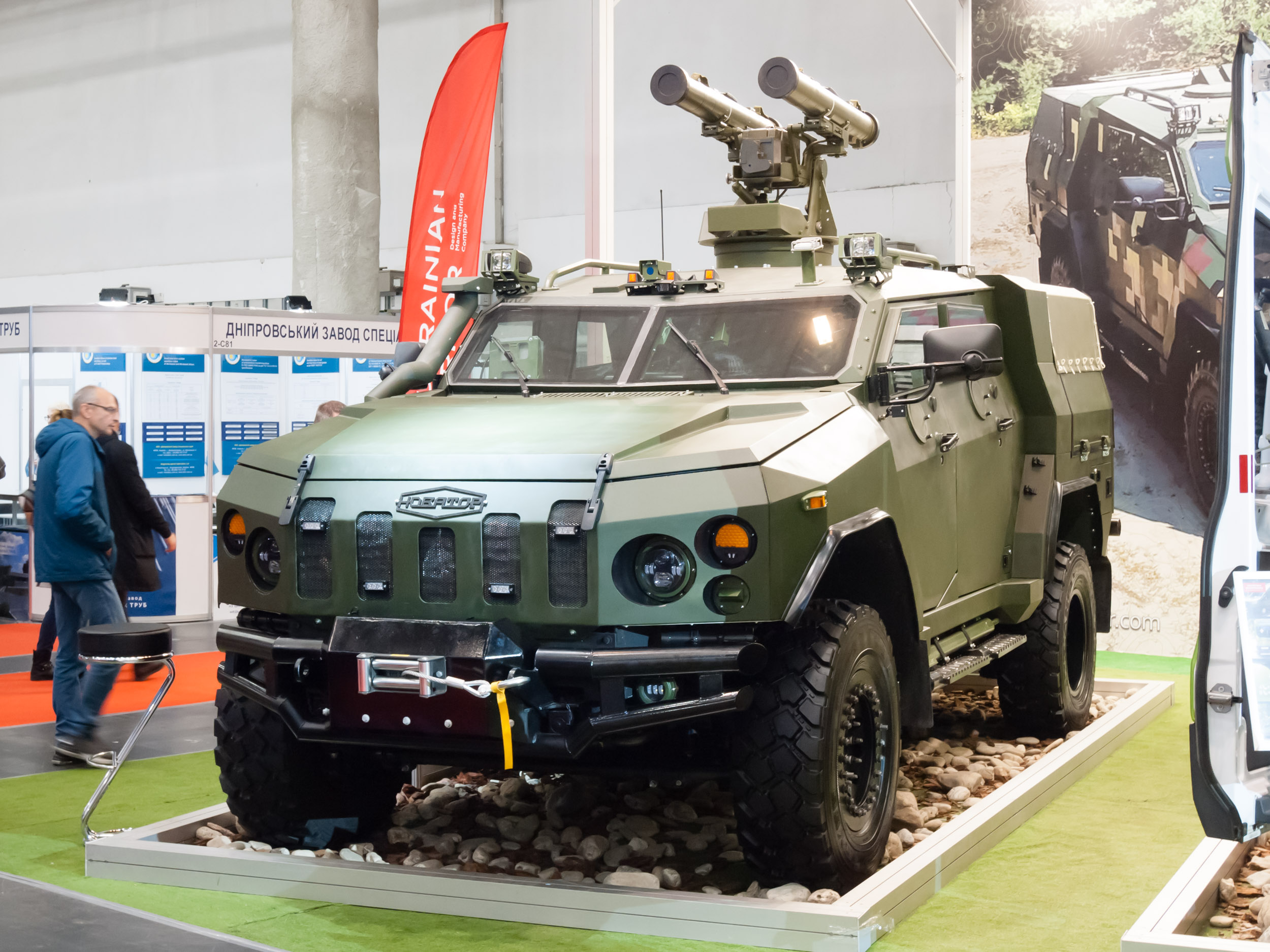
- The Novator at a military fair in Kyiv
- Type: Infantry mobility vehicle
- Place of origin: Ukraine

Service history
- Used by: Ukrainian Armed Forces

Production history
- Designed: 2017
- Manufacturer: Ukrainian Armor
- Produced: 2019–present
- No. built: 1000+

Specifications
- Length: 6.5 m
- Width: 2.35 m (93 in)
- Height: 2.3 m
- Crew: 2
- Armor: B6+ standard
- Main armament: Remote weapon station (optional)
- Engine: 6,7L 4V OHV Ford Power Stroke V8 Turbo Diesel B20
- Transmission: Ford Torqshift six-speed automatic (five-speed in some early models)
- Ground clearance: 300 mm
- Fuel capacity: 160 litres
- Operational range: Up to 700 km
- Maximum speed: Up to 140 km/h on road

The Novator (Ukrainian: Новатор) is a multipurpose infantry mobility vehicle, designed by the Ukrainian Armor company of Ukraine.

== Technical description ==
The Novator weighs 9,000 kg and is 5.8 meters long, 2.405 meters wide, 2.164 meters high, and can carry up to 1,000 kg. It has a maximum road speed of 140 km/h and an operational range of up to 700 km. It is based on the chassis of the Ford F-550.

The vehicle has three main parts with the engine at the front, crew and troop compartment in the middle, and cargo area at the rear. It has a carrying capacity of up to five people with two seats in the front and three in the rear.

The vehicle is protected against small arms fire and shrapnel. A remote weapons station is available for optional armament.

== Novator-2 ==
A new version of the Novator that has improved suspension and control, is 10 cm longer, and has thicker bulletproof glass windows was first presented in Poland in 2023 and was being tested as of January 2024.

== Operators ==
- Ukraine
  - Ukrainian Armed Forces - Over 1000 vehicles received as of September 2025. At least 54 destroyed, captured, damaged and/or abandoned as of September 2025.
- Russia
  - Kadyrovites - captured from the Ukrainian army

== Gallery ==
Novator

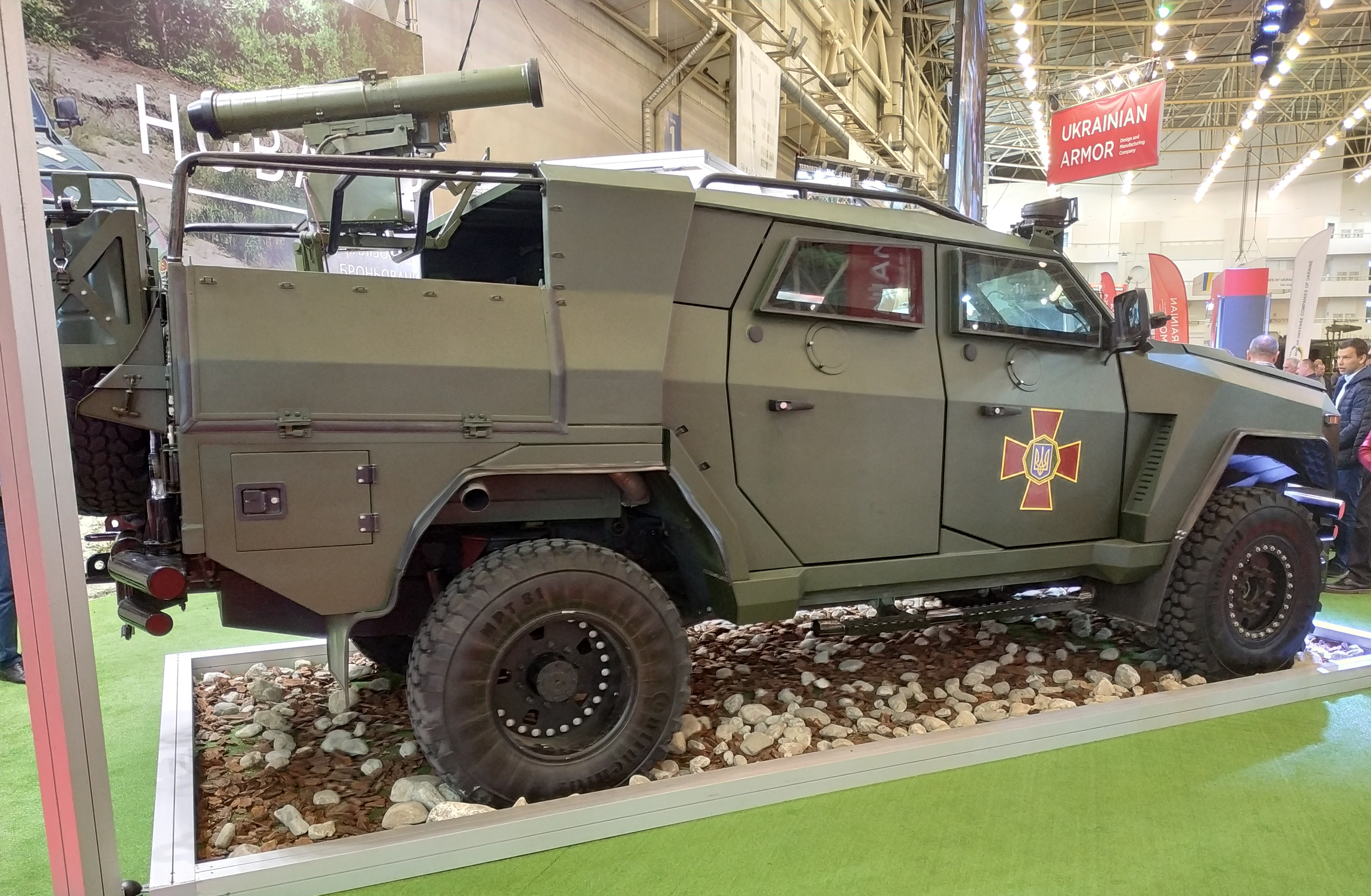

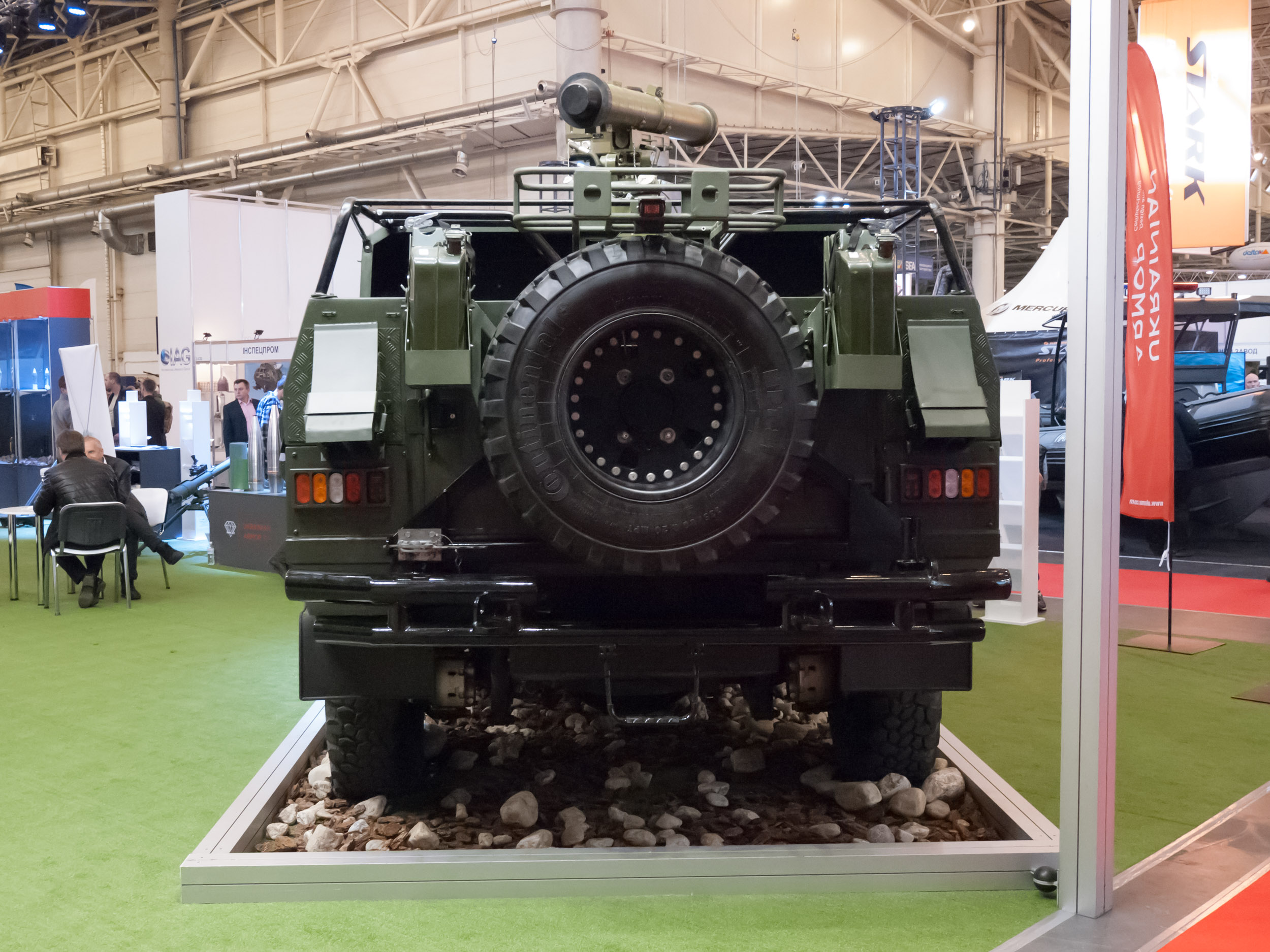

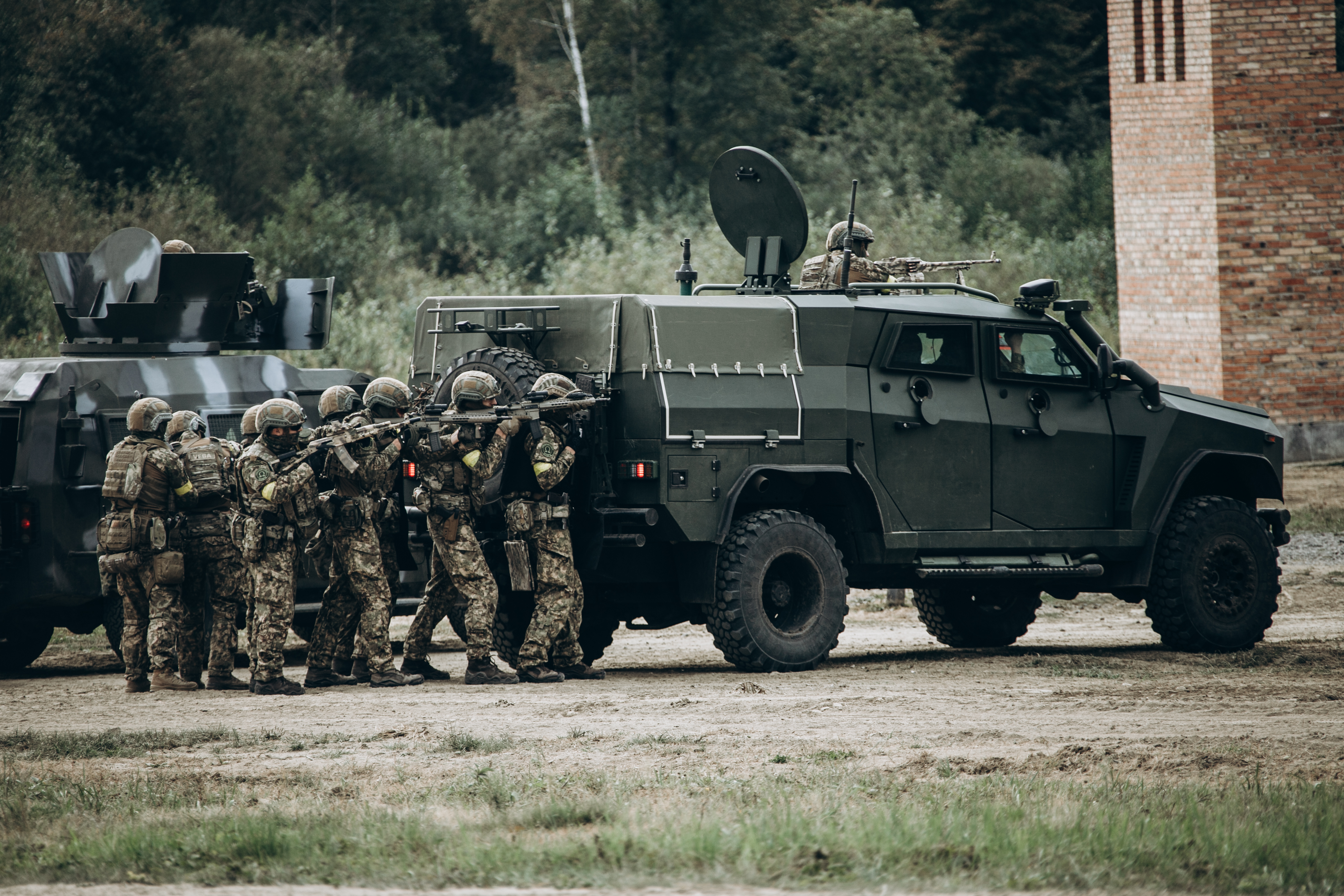

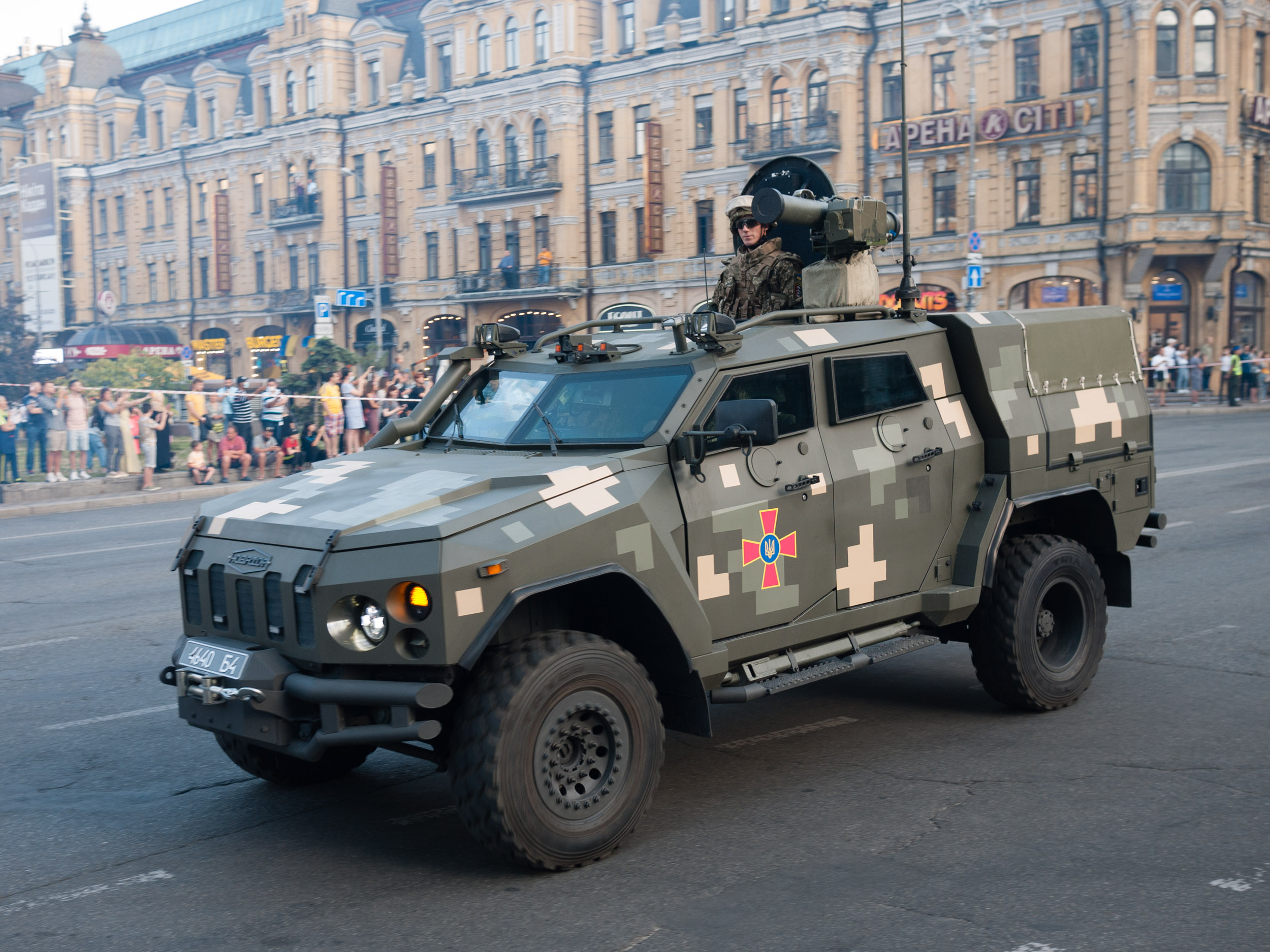

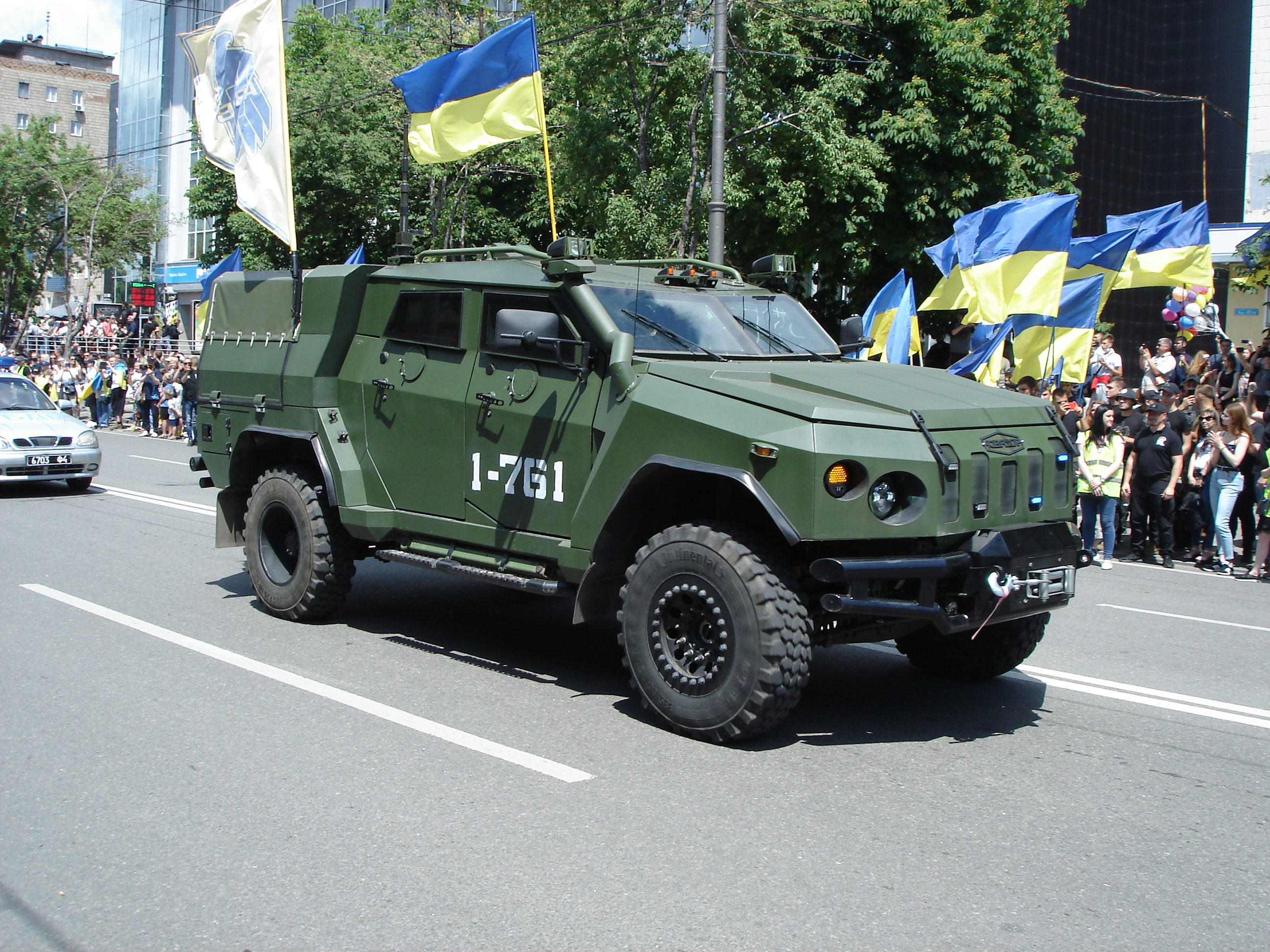
