= Dachne, Odesa Oblast =

Village in Odesa Oblast, Ukraine

Dachne Дачне Dachne and Hnyliakove
- Village
- Dachne
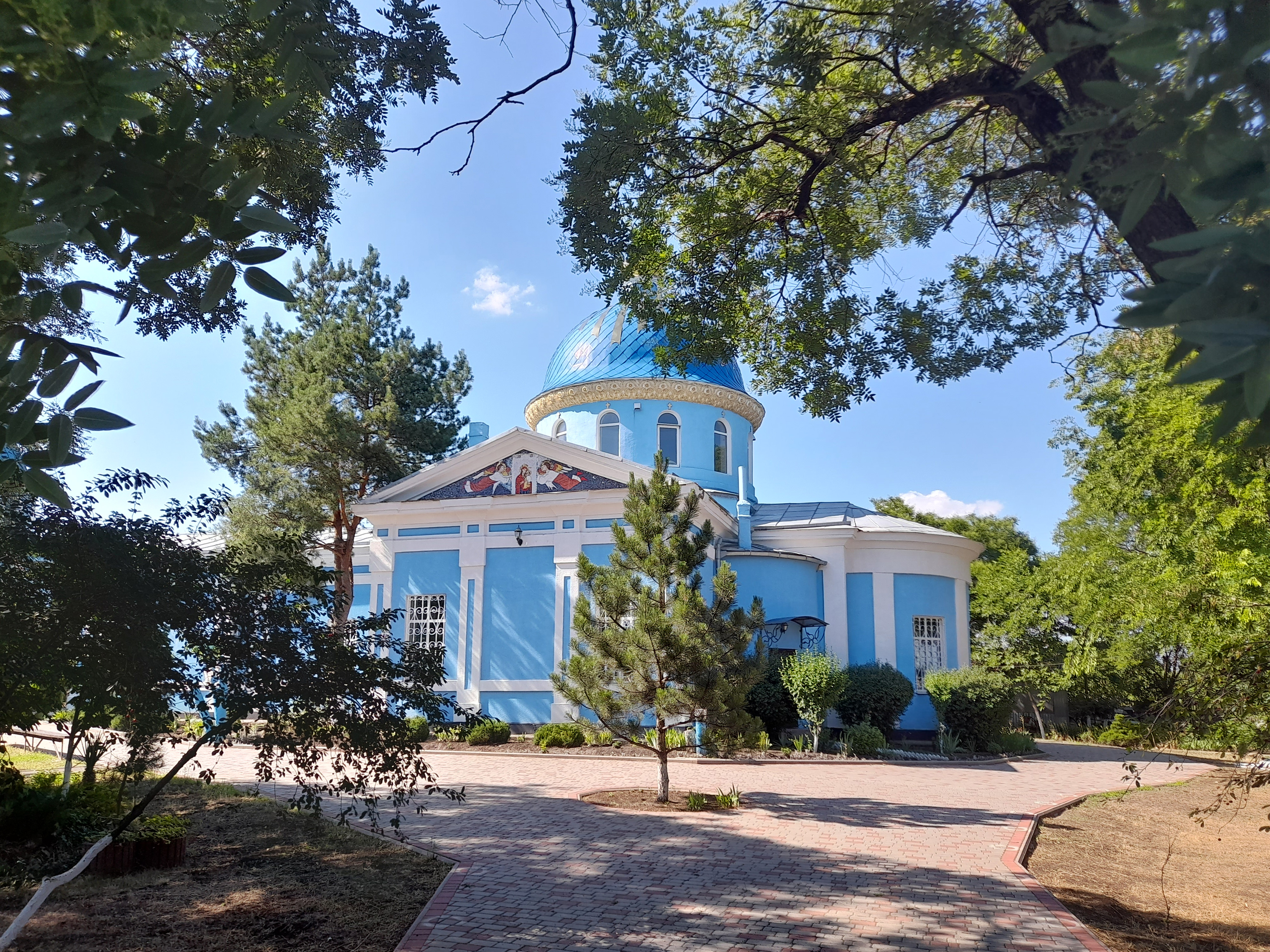
- Intercession church

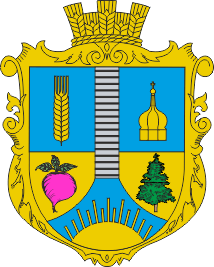
- Coat of arms

- Location within Odesa Oblast Location within Ukraine
- Coordinates: 46°34′39″N 30°32′56″E
- Country: Ukraine
- Oblast: Odesa Oblast
- Raion: Odesa Raion
- Hromada: Dachne rural hromada
- Elevation: 76 m (249 ft)

Population (2021)
  - Total: 11,150
- Time zone: UTC+2 (EET (Kyiv))
  - Summer (DST): UTC+3 (EEST)
- Postal code: 67624
- Area code: +380 4852

Dachne (Ukrainian: Дачне) is a village in Odesa Raion, Odesa Oblast (province) of Ukraine. It hosts the administration of Dachne rural hromada, one of the hromadas of Ukraine.

Dachne was previously located in Biliaivka Raion until it was abolished and its territory was merged into Odesa Raion on 18 July 2020 as part of the administrative reform of Ukraine, which reduced the number of raions of Odesa Oblast to seven.

== Demographics ==
Native language as of the Ukrainian Census of 2001:

- Ukrainian 87.31%
- Russian 11.26%
- Moldovan (Romanian) 0.66%
- Belarusian 0.26%
- Bulgarian 0.2%
- Armenian 0.07%
- Gagauz 0.04%
- Romanian (self-declared) 0.01%
