= 426th Unmanned Systems Regiment (Ukraine) =

- 426 окремий батальйон безпілотних систем
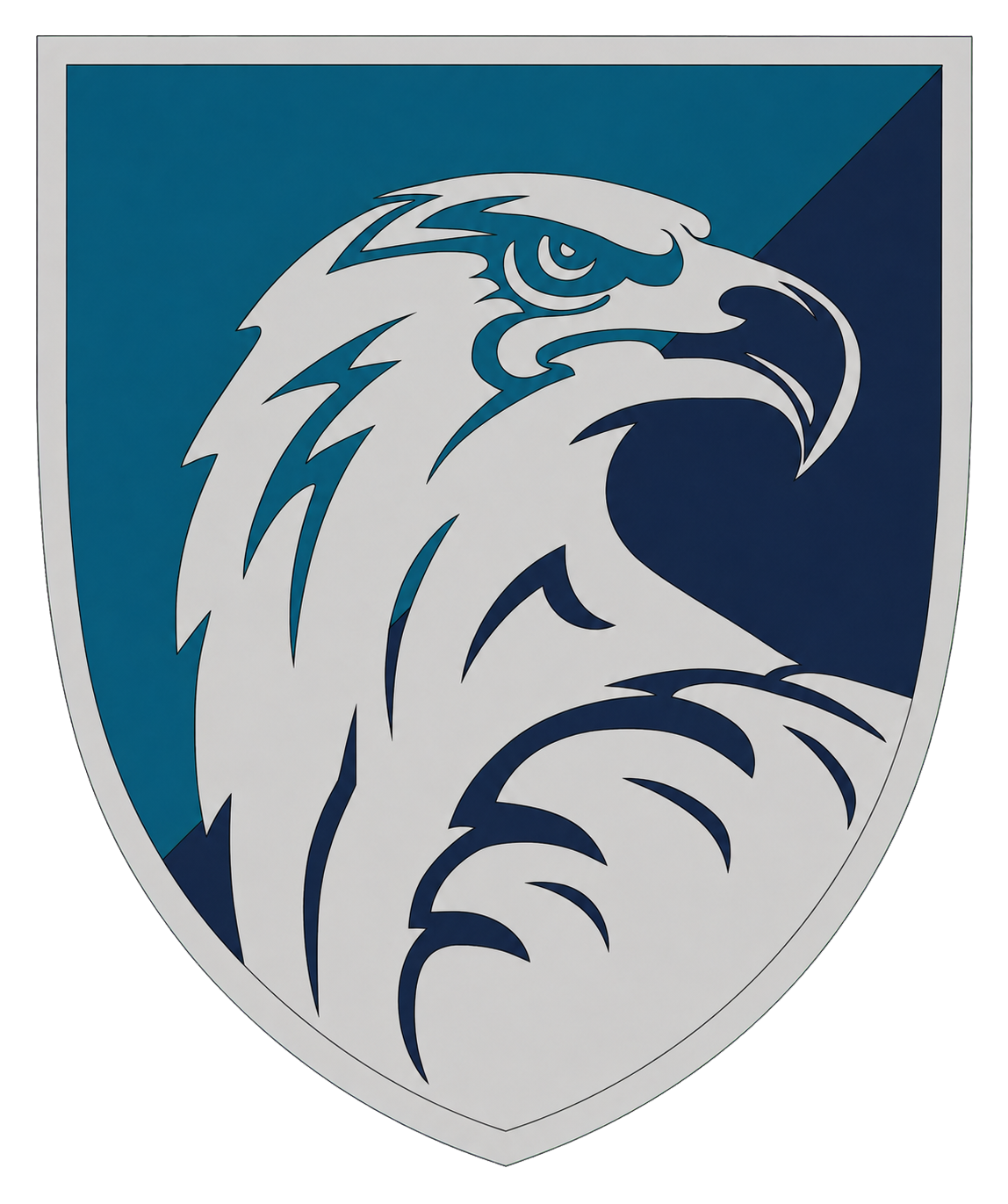
- Active: 29 October 2024-present
- Country: Ukraine
- Branch: Ukrainian Marine Corps
- Type: Marines
- Role: Drone warfare
- Size: Regiment
- Part of: 30th Marine Corps
- Garrison/HQ: Mykolaiv, Mykolaiv Oblast
- Mottos: Unity in thought, strength in action!
- Engagements: Russo-Ukrainian War: 2022 Russian Invasion of Ukraine; Southern Ukraine campaign

Commanders
- Current commander: Major Yegor Nikel

Insignia
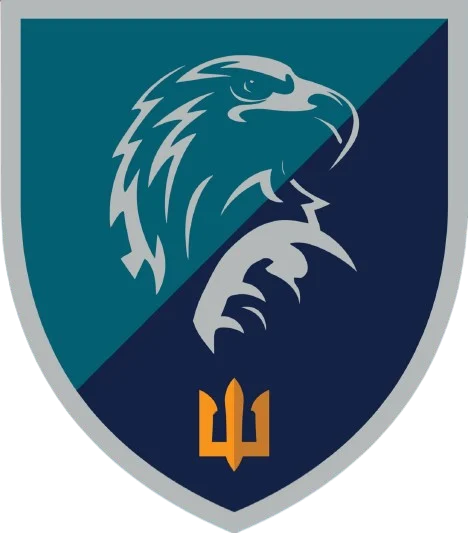
- Former insignia (2024-2026)

The 426th Separate Unmanned Systems Regiment is a military unit of the Ukrainian Marine Corps, operationally under the command of the 30th Marine Corps. The Battalion was established on 29 October 2024 and is based in Mykolaiv, it has seen combat during the Russo-Ukrainian war.

== History ==
It was established on 29 October 2024 as a separate Unmanned Systems battalion of the Ukrainian Marine Corps.

In November 2024, the battalion was conducting a recruitment and public relations campaign in Mykolaiv, aiming to recruit 300 personnel.

In January 2025, the battalion was reported to be using Ukrspecsystems Shark and EW resistant Ukrspecsystems PD-2 UAVs.

On 24 February 2025, it released a video showcasing the destruction of a Russian 2S4 Tyulpan using kamikaze and bomber UAVs in southern Ukraine, four FPV drones attempted a strike but only one was able to hit the target and immobilize it which was followed by a strike from a bomber UAV destroying it completely. In March 2025, the battalion was also reported to be utilizing DeViRo Leleka-100 and BpAK-100 UAVs and conducting reconnaissance, artillery positioning and direct strikes.

On 25 December 2025 it was announced that the unit has been expanded to a regiment.

On 18 March 2026 the regiment published a video showing the destruction of a Strela-10 SHORAD-system by Leleka-100 FPV-Drone.

== Equipment ==
Model	Image	Origin	Type	Number	Details
Unmanned Aerial Vehicle
DJI Mavic		China	FPV drone		
DeViRo Leleka-100 ("Stork")		Ukraine	Air reconnaissance/loitering munition		
Ukrspecsystems Shark		Ukraine	Air reconnaissance		
Ukrspecsystems Mini Shark		Ukraine	Air reconnaissance		
Ukrspecsystems PD-2		Ukraine	Unmanned surveillance and reconnaissance aerial vehicle/Bomber UAV		
BpAk-100		Ukraine			

== See also ==
- 18th Anti-Tank Battalion
- 421st Unmanned Systems Battalion

== Weblinks ==
- Instagram
- Facebook
