= 421st Unmanned Systems Battalion (Ukraine) =

Battalion of the Ukrainian Air Assault Forces

421st Separate Unmanned Systems Battalion
- 421-й батальйон безпілотних систем «САПСАН»
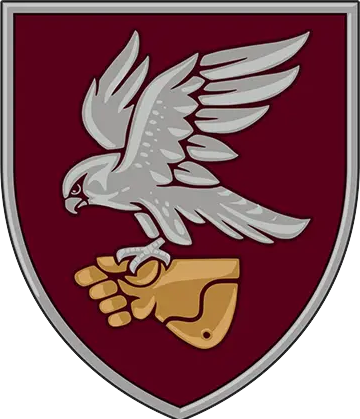
- Active: 2024-present
- Country: Ukraine
- Allegiance: Armed Forces of Ukraine
- Branch: Ukrainian Air Assault Forces
- Type: Air assault infantry
- Role: Drone warfare Electronic warfare ISTAR
- Size: Battalion
- Part of: Air Assault Forces Command
- Motto: Technology in the hands of heroes!
- Engagements: Russo-Ukrainian War: 2022 Russian Invasion of Ukraine
- Decorations: For Courage and Bravery
- Website: Website

Commanders
- Current commander: Lt. Col. Ivan Levkivsky

The 421st Separate Unmanned Systems Battalion Sapsan is a separate unmanned systems battalion of Ukrainian Air Assault Forces which specializes in drone warfare, electronic warfare, and ISTAR especially UAVs and UGVs to supplement other air assault infantry and airborne forces units.

== History ==
The 421st Separate Unmanned Systems Battalion was established in early 2024 as part of the Ukrainian Air Assault Forces to increase the drone warfare capabilities namely UAVs and UGVs to support air assault infantry and airborne forces units during combat operations by conducting effective reconnaissance, surveillance, and direct targets strikes.

It's recruitment campaign continued in June 2024 during which time period, the battalion was armed with the Leleka, Vampire, Bat and Mavic-type UAVs and FPV drones and had already seen combat on the battlefield.

It was also armed with R-34 and Eachan, as well as 300 day and night FPV drones. In October 2024, the battalion received Ukrspecsystems Shark reconnaissance UAVs.

In November 2024, Lutsk city council transferred DJI Mavic quadcopters, electronic warfare systems, FPV drones, Ecoflow, Starlink and generators to the battalion.

On 13 April 2026 the unit was awarded the Presidential Award For Courage and Bravery by the President of Ukraine Volodymyr Zelenskyy.

== Gallery ==
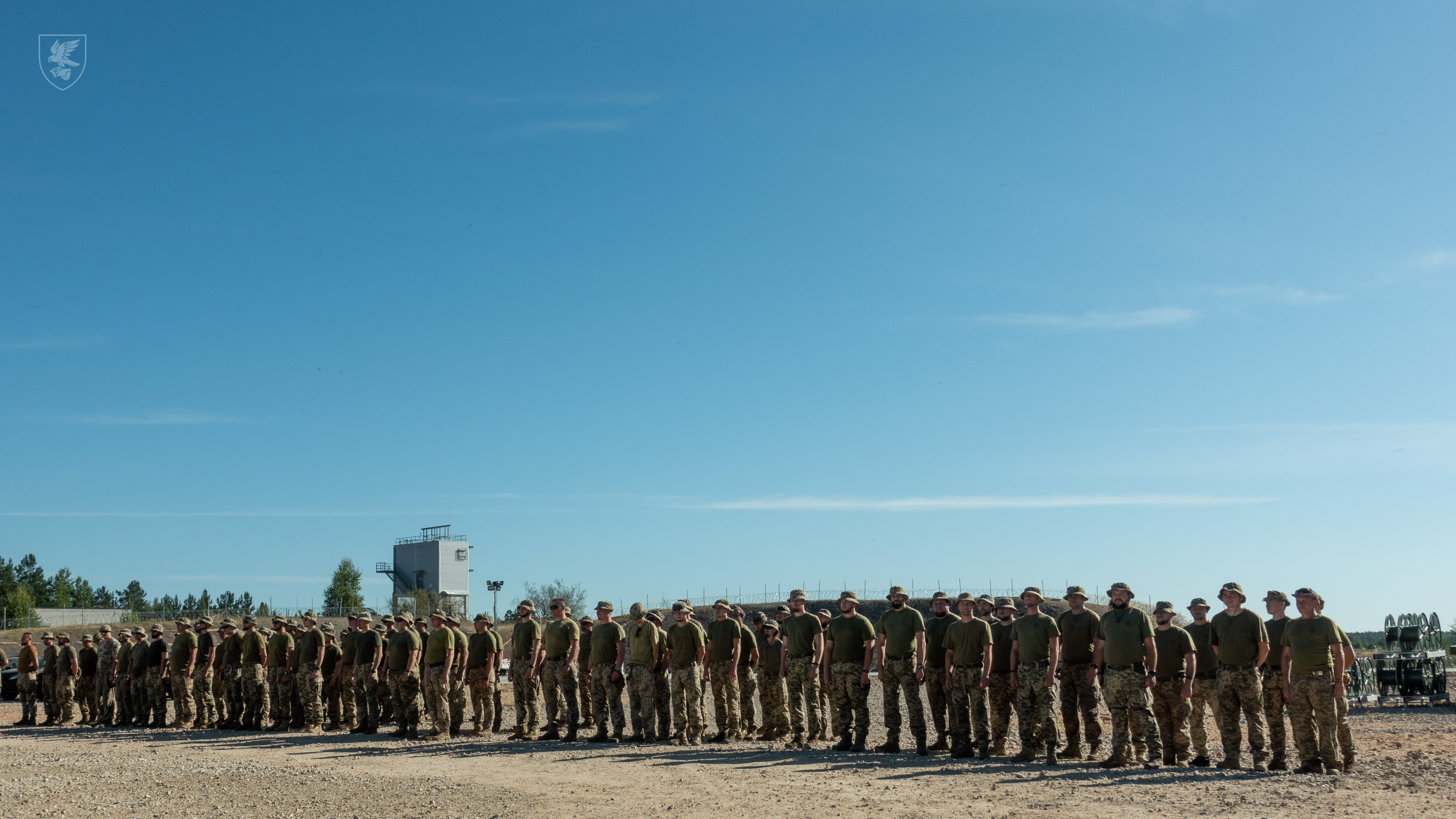

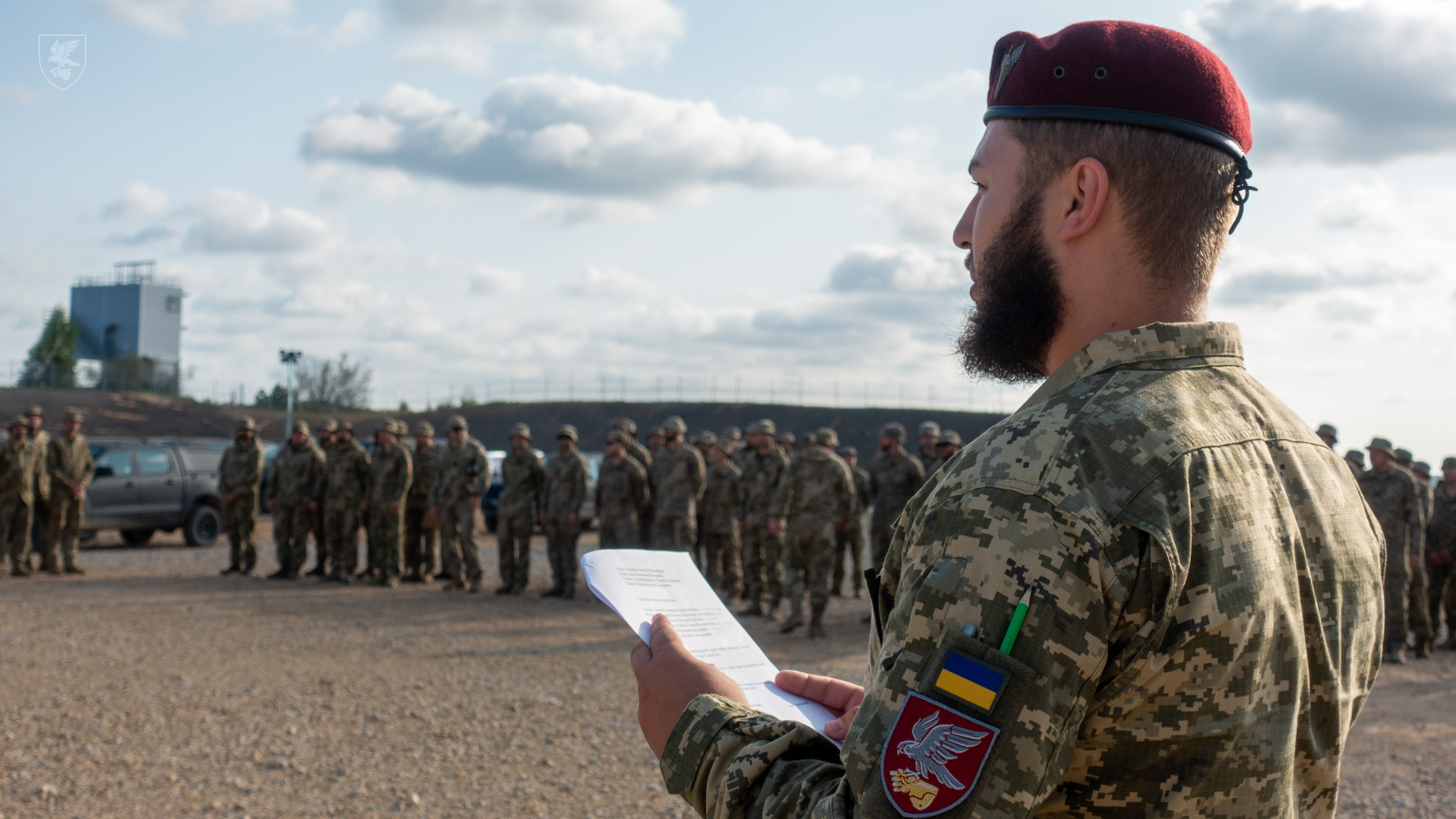

== Weblinks ==
- Telegram
- Facebook
- YouTube
- Instagram
- X

== See also ==
- 414th Unmanned Strike Aviation Brigade
- 82nd Air Assault Brigade
