= 40th Marine Brigade =

Ukrainian military unit

40th Marine Brigade 40th Coastal Defense Brigade (2025-2026) 150th Mechanized Brigade (2023-2025)
- 40 окрема бригада Морської Піхоти
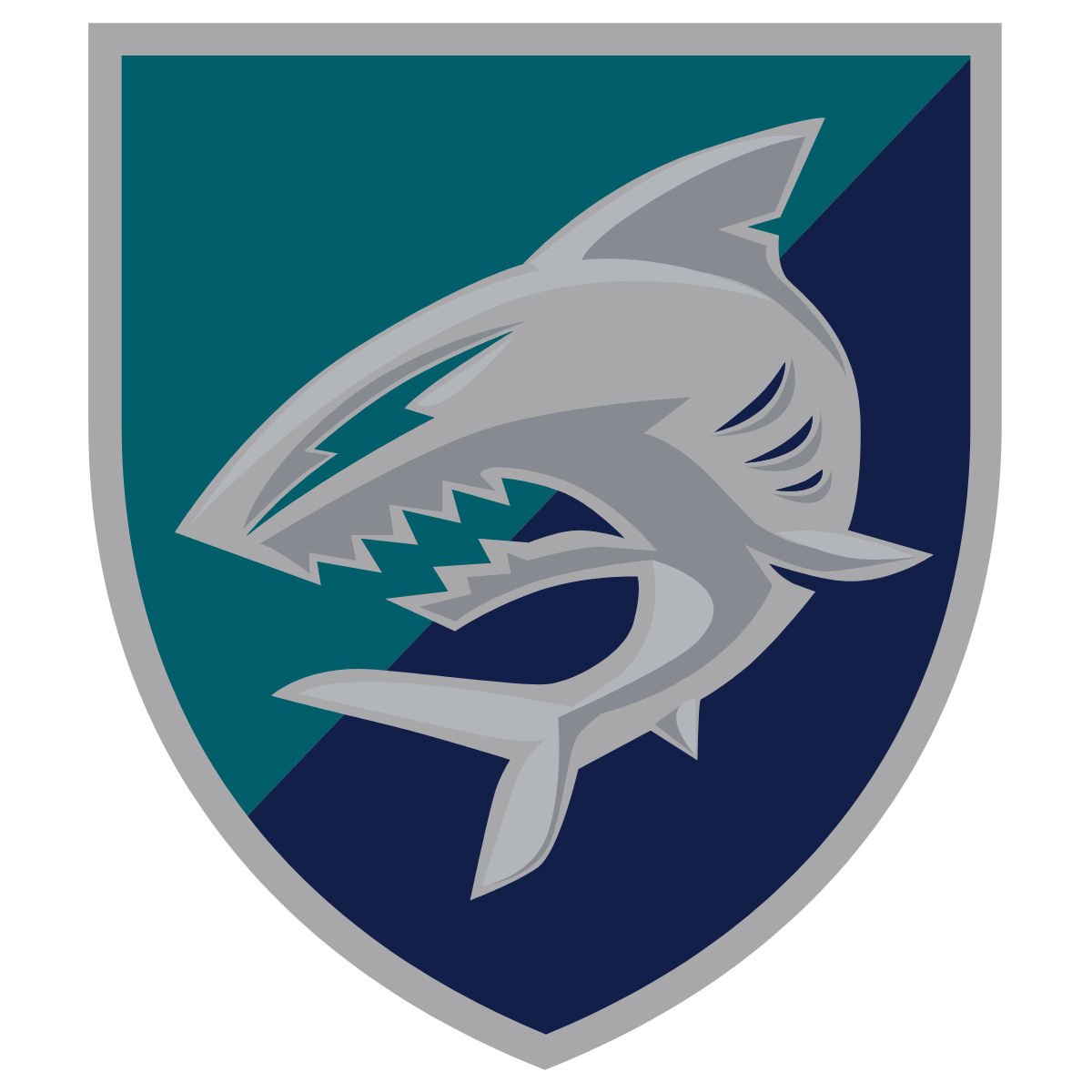
- Active: 10 October 2023 – present
- Country: Ukraine
- Branch: Ukrainian Marine Corps
- Type: Marines
- Role: Marine Infantry
- Size: Brigade
- Part of: 30th Marine Corps
- Mottos: Courage and Strength
- Engagements: Russo-Ukrainian War; Russian invasion of Ukraine; Eastern Ukraine campaign; Battle of Toretsk; Southern Ukraine campaign; Dnieper campaign (2022–present)
- Website: Official Facebook page

Commanders
- Current commander: Lieutenant Colonel Vladyslav Halkin

Insignia
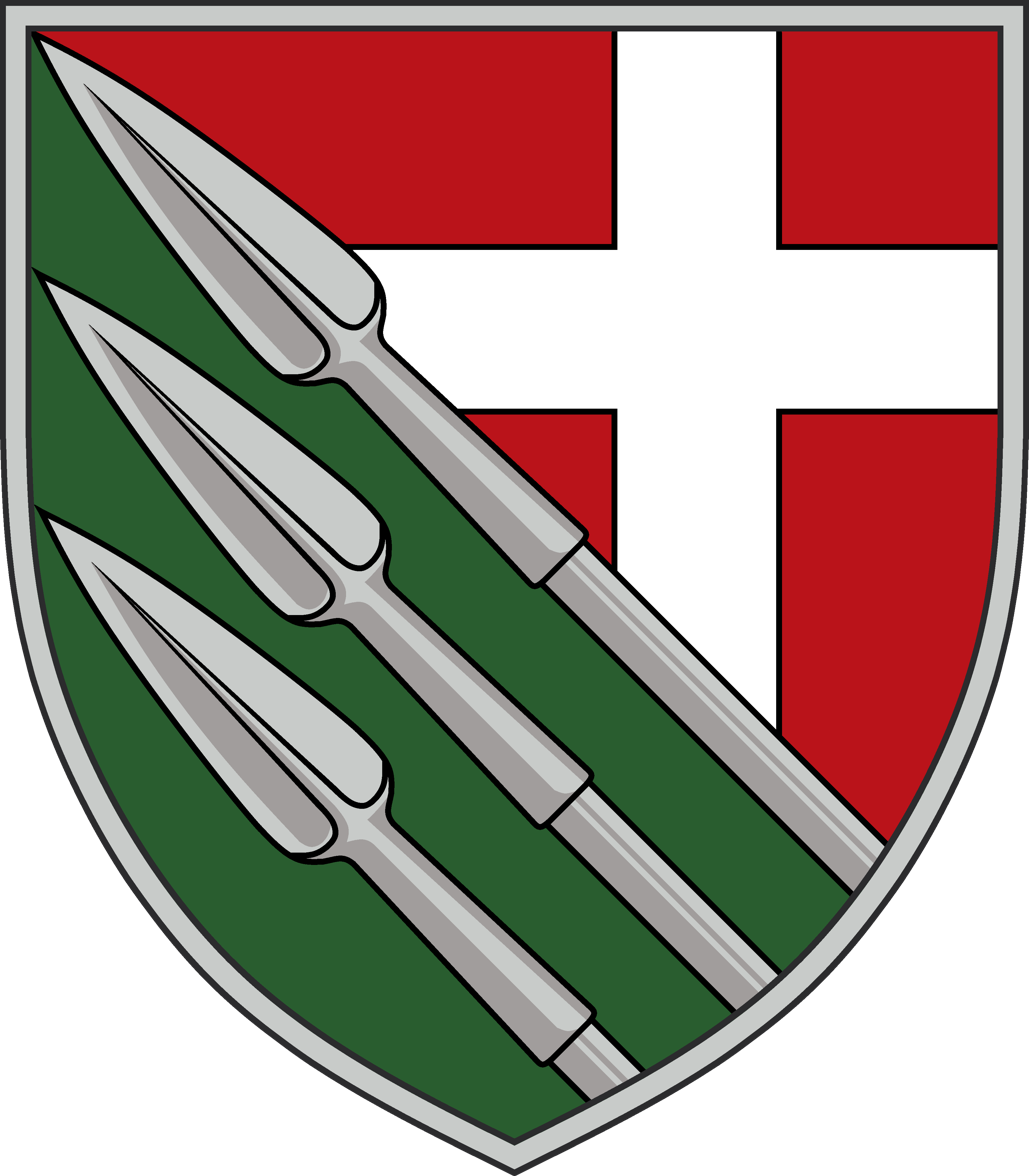
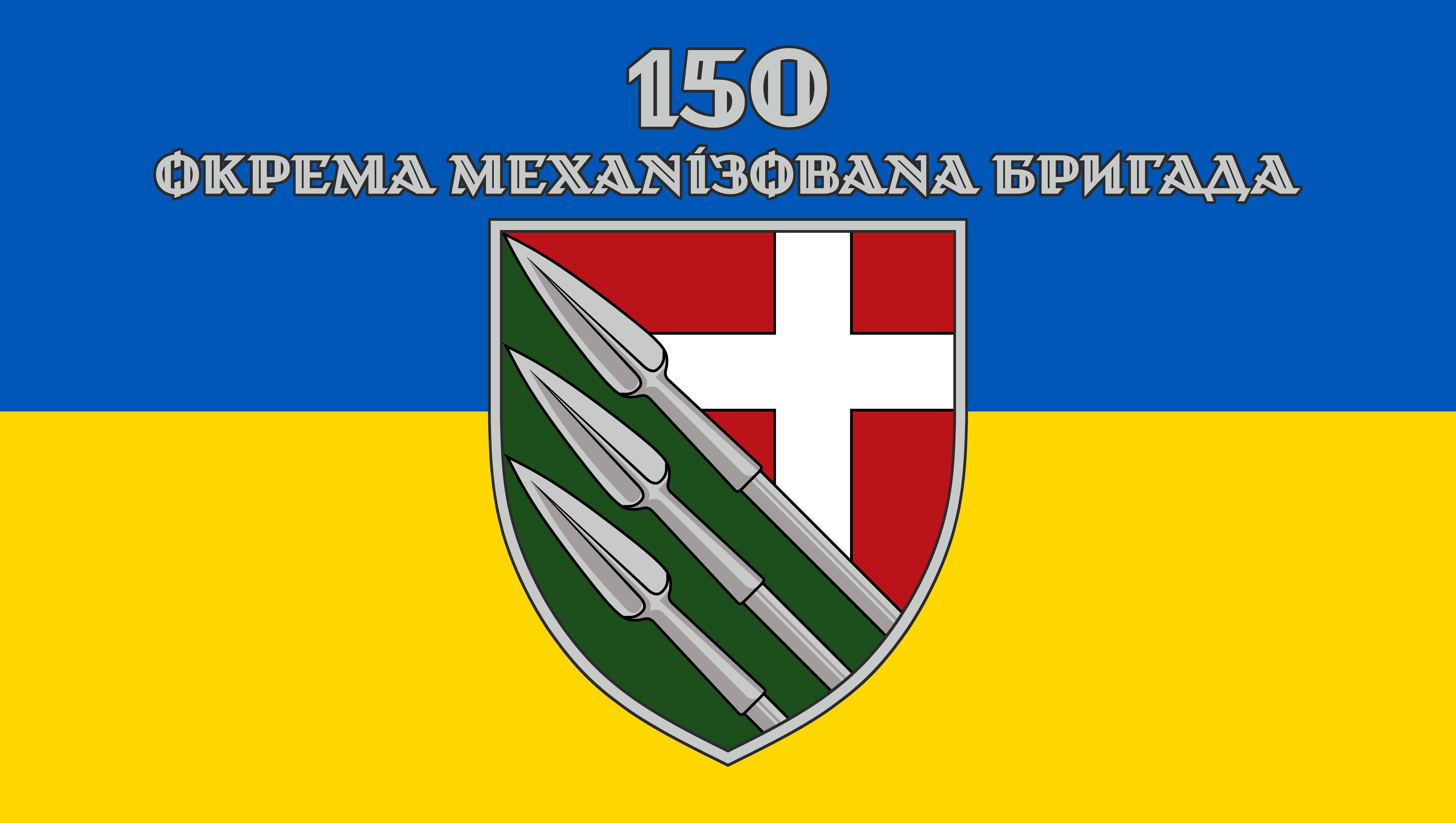
- 150th Brigade (2023 – 2024)

The Separate 40th Marine Brigade (MUN A4935) is a unit of the Ukrainian Marine Corps. It was initially formed as the 150th Mechanized Brigade in 2023 as a part of the creation of four other brigades to expand the Ukrainian Ground Forces in response to the Russian invasion of Ukraine. It was expected to participate in a potential Ukrainian counteroffensive in 2024. In December 2024, the brigade was transferred to the Ukrainian Marine Corps and was dispatched to Kherson Oblast.

Before being dispatched to Kherson, it was known that elements of the brigade had been deployed to the Toretsk direction in eastern Ukraine to help stabilise the situation near Niu York and Toretsk itself.

== History ==
=== Formation ===
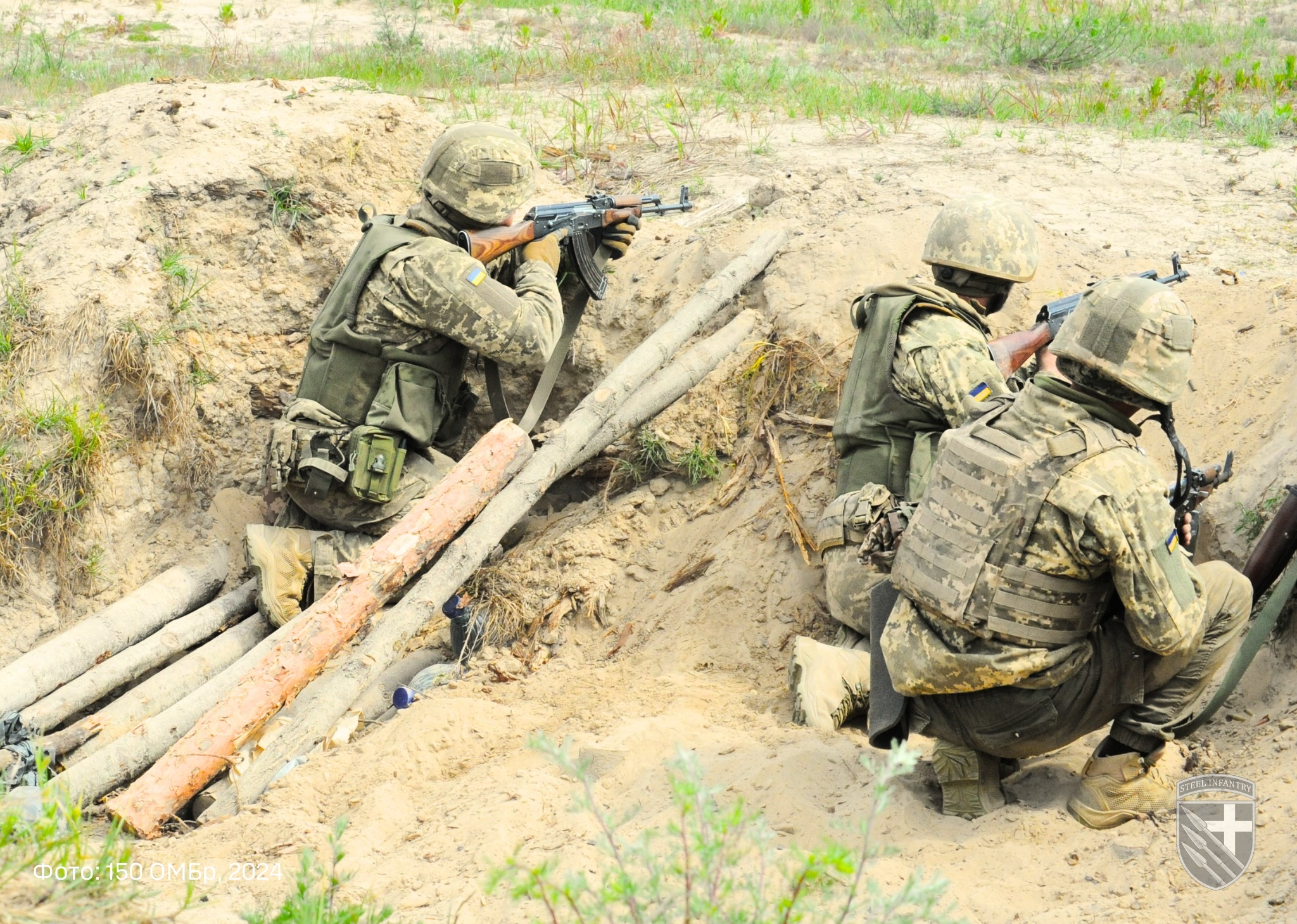
Mechanized infantry of the brigade during an exercise.

The brigade was announced in mid-October 2023, alongside the creation of five new mechanized brigades as part of the Ukrainian Ground Forces, accounting for a five per cent expansion of the Ground Forces.

By 17 October 2023, it was reported that the brigade had already received a military unit identification number and was in the formation stage. The brigade reported that the unit is trained under NATO standards and personal war experience.

Forbes reported that the brigades are drawing their cadres of experienced and non-commissioned officers from existing brigades, while filling out the rest of their positions with new mobilized recruits. Additionally, the brigade is reportedly structured with the command and organisational core consisting of experienced servicemen with combat experience gained in eastern Ukraine in skirmishes with the Russian Armed Forces. The brigade includes military personnel who have recently started their career, alongside experienced soldiers.

According to Forbes, it is unclear where the brigade will receive its equipment, making them a mechanized brigade, rather than a glorified infantry or motorized brigade. It was noted that the new brigades may not receive new, modern vehicles such as Polish KTO Rosomaks 'Wolverines' but will instead have to make do with old, vulnerable, and plentiful BMPs and other old Soviet-era equipment. Since then, the brigade has upgraded several armoured vehicles to meet modern requirements.

=== Transfer to Marine Corps ===
At the end of December 2024, the brigade was transferred to the 30th Marine Corps and was transformed into the 40th Coastal Defense Brigade. In December 2024, the brigade stopped multiple Russian assaults in Kherson Oblast, destroying multiple vessels, pieces of equipment, positions, and killing Russian soldiers using drones. In January 2025, many Russian vessels were destroyed by the brigade on the Dnieper. The brigade was reportedly successful in repulsing a Russian amphibious offensive across the Dnieper. Russian forces had deployed 300 vessels in preparation for the amphibious assault but were being continuously repulsed by the UAV units of the brigade, who were also able to destroy multiple Russian positions across the river. In January 2025, the brigade received BvS10 armored amphibious assault vehicles. On 22 January 2025, the brigade released a video showing its BMP-1 IFVs armed with "spear" combat modules conducting demining operations and also conducting strikes on Russian positions on the left bank of Kherson Oblast destroying Russian positions and equipment. The brigade also utilizes BMP-2 IFVs in its operations. The brigade also usesUkrspecsystems Sharks and ZU-23-2s for operations against Russian forces.

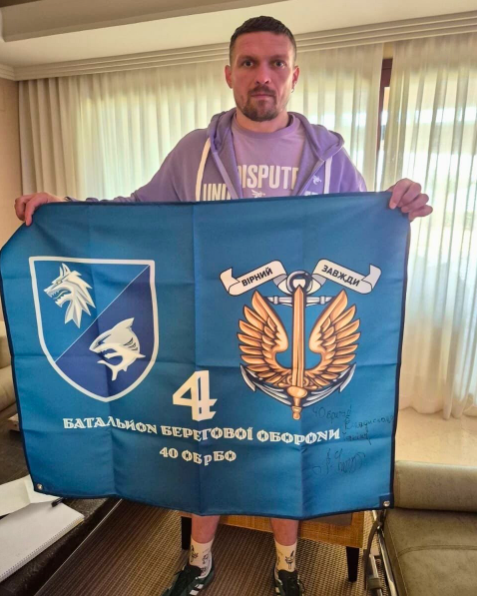
Oleksandr Usyk, the Ukrainian undisputed heavyweight boxing champion, posing with the flag of the 4th Coastal Defense Battalion of the brigade.

In early 2026 the unit was reorganized and renamed. The 40th Coastal Defense Brigade therefore becoming the 40th Marine Brigade.

=== Insignia ===
The insignia of the 150th Mechanized Brigade had an appearance reflecting where the unit's garrison was located, in Volyn, Volyn Oblast. The insignia's appearance consisted of a shield cut in half diagonally, with the lower portion being a green canvas with three spears pointing from the bottom right to the top left of the shield. The upper half of the shield is a red canvas with a white heraldic cross, symbolising the flag of Volyn Oblast. A subdued variant of the insignia also exists in darker, greyer green colours to hide its primary colour elements, making it less distinguishable and visible.

The insignia is strikingly similar to that of the 14th Mechanized Brigade, another mechanized brigade of the Ukrainian Ground Forces, which also has a spear and a flag of Volyn Oblast on its insignia.

== Equipment ==
=== Small arms ===
The brigade is armed with a variety of small weapons, and official publications by the brigade show that soldiers of the brigade primarily utilise older models of the Kalashnikov rifle series, such as the AKM. Very few publicised materials of the brigade show more modernised variants of these rifles, such as the AK-74, used in limited numbers. Additionally, the brigade also possesses some units of M240Bs.

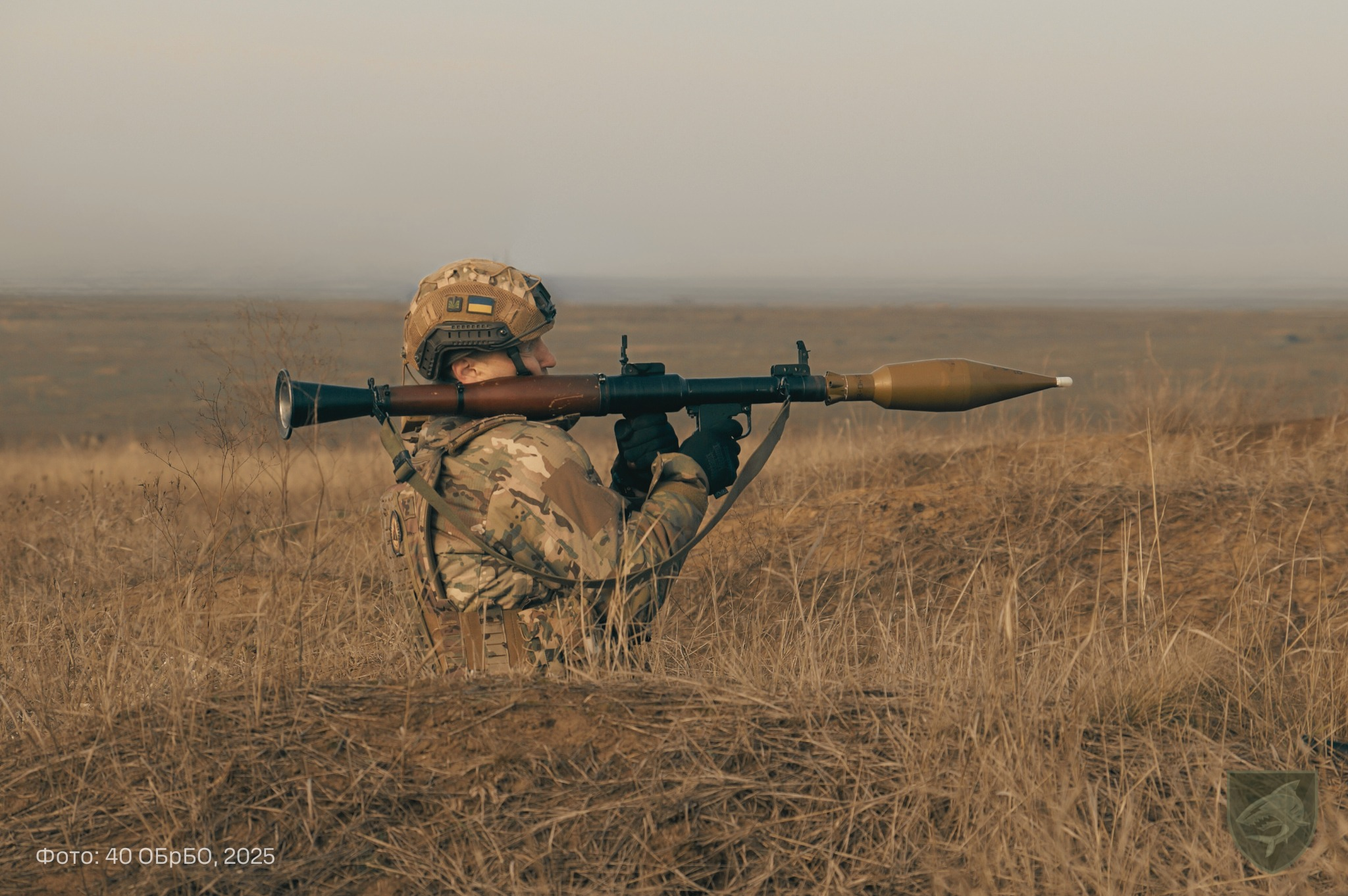
A Ukrainian marine of the brigade with a RPG-7 during training exercises.

As of July 2024, the 150th Mechanized Brigade utilized the following small arms:

- AKM – Soviet/Russian assault rifle
- AK-74 – Soviet/Russian assault rifle
- AK-74M – Russian assault rifle
- M240B – American general-purpose machine gun

=== Artillery ===
- AZP S-60 – Soviet autocannon
- ZU-23-2 – Soviet towed 23 mm anti-aircraft twin autocannon

=== Vehicles ===
The brigade holds several vehicles in its arsenal. Similar to other brigades, such as the 154th Mechanized Brigade, the brigade has received older Soviet-era model tanks such as the T-64BV. Several T-64BV tanks are in the brigade's possession, notably with the modifications from 2017.

The brigade also has a small quantity of infantry fighting vehicles, such as the BMP-2, with one present in the brigade's inventory and service. Some of these vehicles are also of Czechoslovak origin and are designated as BVP-2. Limited BMP-1s have also been cited in publications by the brigade, a BMP-1TS variant used by the brigade. The brigade is also known to have several BRDM-2s in service, and BREM-2.

In June 2024, it was reported that several old Soviet-era tanks, such as the T-64, in the brigade's service were upgraded to meet modern standards.

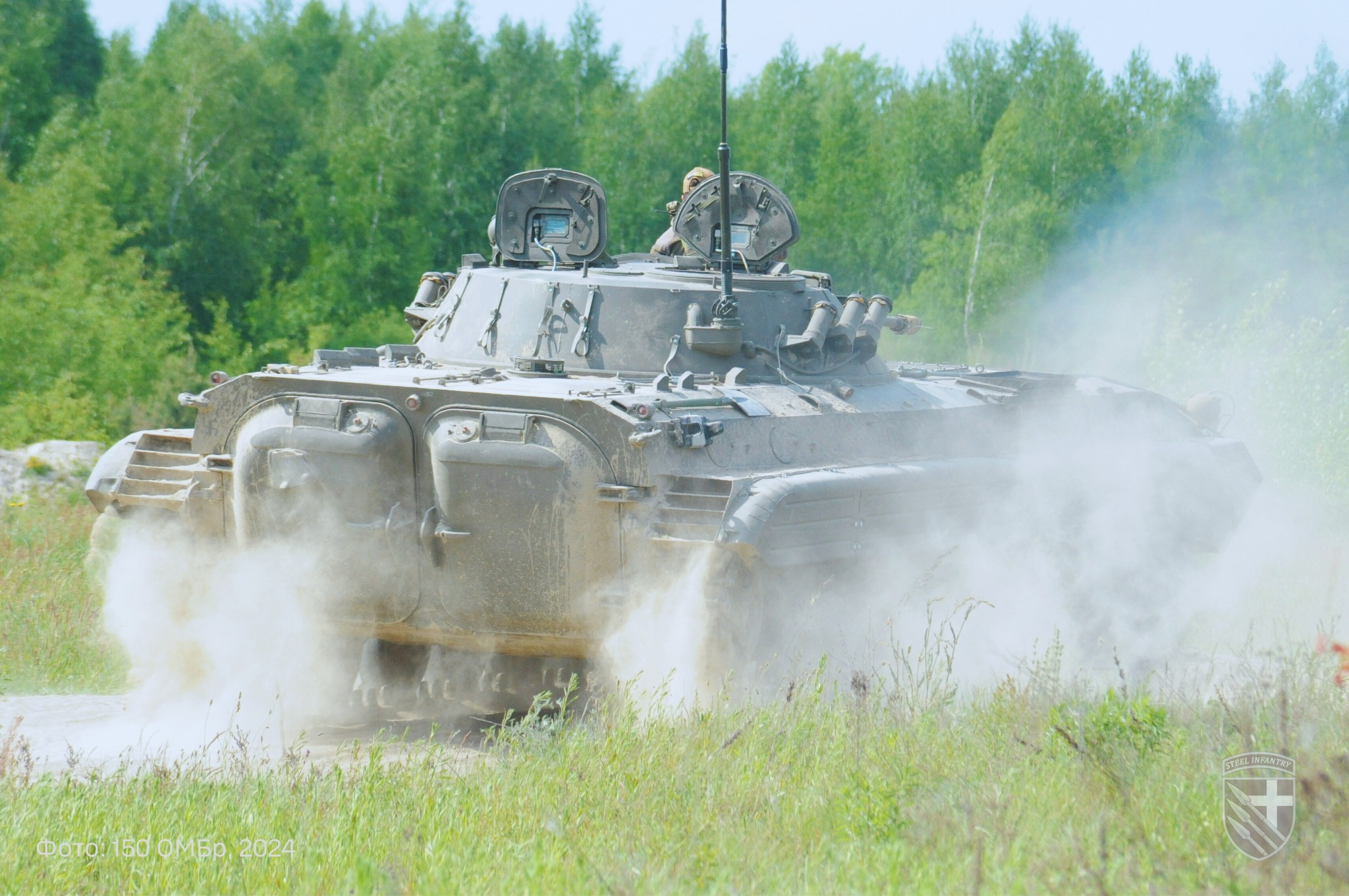
BMP-2 being used by the brigade during an exercise.

As of June 2024, the 150th Mechanized Brigade operated the following vehicles:

- 2S1 Gvozdika – Soviet self-propelled howitzer
- BMP-1 – Soviet infantry fighting vehicle/armored fighting vehicle
- BMP-1TS – Ukrainian/Soviet infantry fighting vehicle/armored personnel carrier
- BMP-2 – Soviet infantry fighting vehicle
- BRDM-2 – Soviet amphibious armored scout car
- BREM-2 –Soviet armored recovery vehicle
- BVP-2 – Czechoslovak infantry fighting vehicle
- T-64BV Model 2017 – Ukrainian/Soviet main battle tank

As of 2025, the brigade operates the following vehicles:

- BM-21 "Grad" – Soviet multiple rocket launcher
- BMP-1TS – Ukrainian/Soviet infantry fighting vehicle/armored personnel carrier
- BTR-82 – Russian amphibious armored personnel carrier
- BvS10 – Swedish-British amphibious armored vehicle
- HMMWV – American infantry mobility vehicle
- International MaxxPro – American MRAP armored fighting vehicle
- T-64B1V Model 2017 – Ukrainian/Soviet main battle tank
- YPR-765 – Dutch infantry fighting vehicle

== Russo-Ukrainian War ==
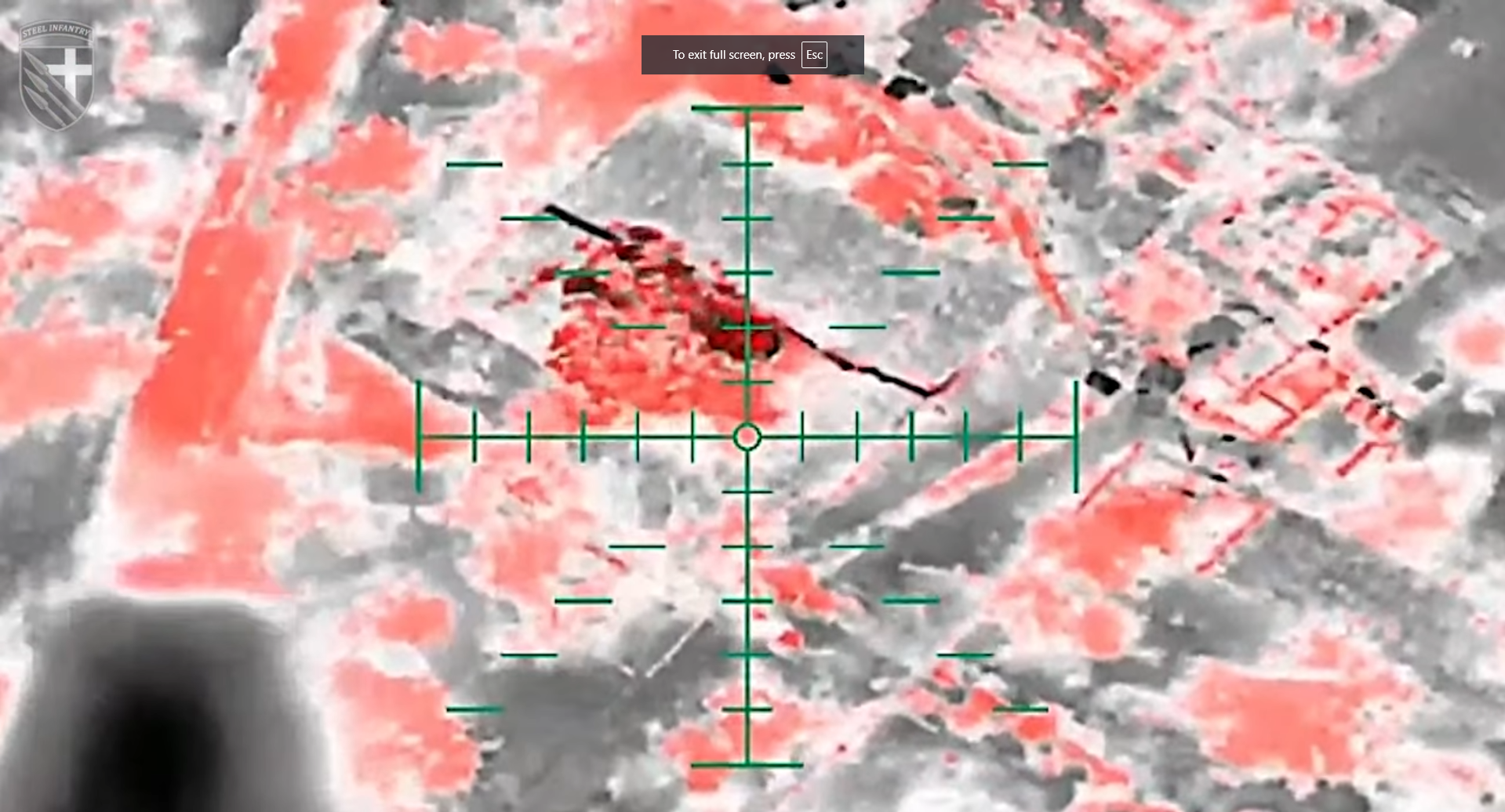
The brigade bombarding Russian positions in Toretsk, Eastern Ukraine, August 2024.

=== Russian invasion of Ukraine ===
The brigade was reported to be formed in anticipation of a potential Ukrainian counteroffensive in 2024, as well as to bolster Ukrainian defenses in eastern Ukraine to relieve depleted units deployed there.

==== Battle of Toretsk ====
Similar to other brigades such as the 153rd Mechanized Brigade, which has been deployed to Kharkiv Oblast amidst Russia's 2024 Kharkiv offensive, seeing combat action, the brigade has also recently been deployed in response to the growing situation in eastern Ukraine. According to social media publications, it was acknowledged that some elements of the brigade have been deployed to the Toretsk direction in Ukraine, an industrial city located in Bakhmut Raion, which is located approximately 15 kilometers from the town of Niu York in eastern Ukraine. This confirms the purpose of the brigade to be utilised in bolstering Ukrainian defenses in the east of the country.

== Structure ==
=== 2024 ===
As of 2024, the 150th Mechanized Brigade's structure was as follows:

- 150th Mechanized Brigade
  - Brigade Headquarters
    - Management
    - Commandant Platoon
  - 1st Mechanized Battalion
  - 2nd Mechanized Battalion
  - 3rd Mechanized Battalion
  - Tank Battalion
  - Artillery Group
  - Anti-Aircraft Defense Battalion
  - Drone Battalion "Orion"
  - Reconnaissance Company
  - Engineer Battalion
  - Maintenance Battalion
  - Logistic Battalion
  - Signal Company
  - Radar Company
  - Medical Company
  - CBRN Protection Company

=== Current ===
As of 2025, the 40th Coastal Defense Brigade's structure is as follows:

- 40th Coastal Defense Brigade
  - Brigade Headquarters and Services
    - Management
    - Commandant Platoon
  - 1st Coastal Defense Battalion
    - 1st Coastal Defense Company
    - 2nd Coastal Defense Company
    - 3rd Coastal Defense Company
    - Company of Strike Aviation Systems "Krechet"
  - 2nd Coastal Defense Battalion "ZGRAYA"
    - 4th Coastal Defense Company
    - 5th Coastal Defense Company
    - 6th Coastal Defense Company
    - Company of Strike Aviation Systems
  - 3rd Coastal Defense Battalion. Commander: Volodymyr
    - 7th Coastal Defense Company
    - 8th Coastal Defense Company
    - 9th Coastal Defense Company
    - Company of Strike Aviation Systems "Flying Shark"
    - Drone Workshop
  - 4th Coastal Defense Battalion
    - Company of Strike Aviation Systems
  - Special Unit "Barracuda"
  - Tank Company. Commander: Serhii
  - Coastal Defense Artillery Regt
  - Anti-Aircraft Defense Battalion. Commander: "Gor"
  - Drone Battalion "Orion"
  - Reconnaissance Company
  - Combat Engineer Battalion
  - Maintenance Battalion
  - Logistic Battalion
  - Signal Company
  - Radar Company
  - Medical Company
  - Psychological and Recovery Group
  - CBRN Protection Company
  - Recruitment Department Commander: Oleh Zakharkiv
  - MP Platoon
  - Brigade Band

== Commanders ==
Lieutenant Colonel Vladyslav Halkin (? – present)
