= 32nd Artillery Brigade (Ukraine) =

Ukrainian Marine Corps unit

- 32-а окрема артилерійська бригада
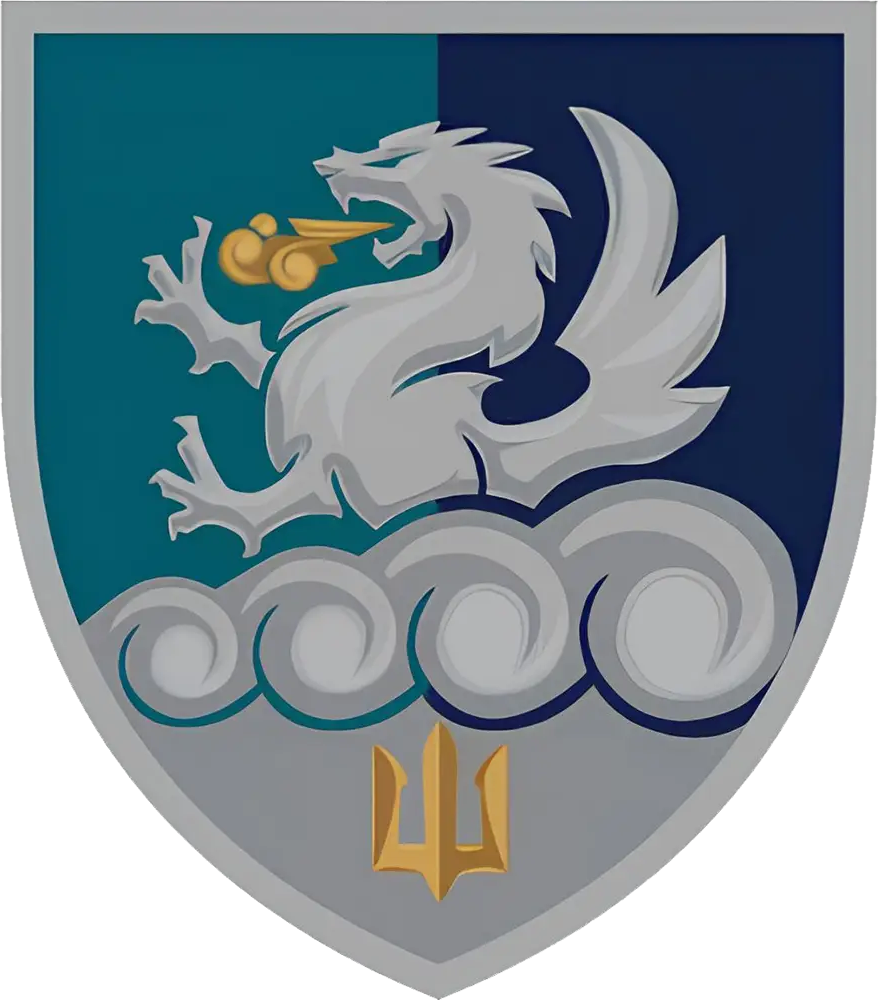
- Sleeve Patch
- Active: March 31, 2016 – Today
- Country: Ukraine
- Branch: Ukrainian Marine Corps
- Role: Artillery Forces
- Part of: 30th Marine Corps
- Garrison/HQ: Altestove, Odesa Oblast
- Motto(s): Blessed power!
- Engagements: Russo-Ukrainian War: Dobropillia; Chornianka; Nova Maiachka; Podo-Kalynivka

Commanders
- Current commander: Col. Volodymyr Mohylnyi

Insignia
- Flag

The 32nd Artillery Brigade (Ukrainian: 32-а окрема артилерійська бригада) is a brigade of the Ukrainian Marine Corps formed in 2016.

== History ==
The unit was formed in 2016 as the 32nd Rocket Artillery Regiment, on the basis of an artillery battalion from the 406th Artillery Brigade in 2016.

=== Russo-Ukrainian War ===
In 2023, the rocket artillery regiment was reformed as an artillery brigade.

== Structure ==
- Brigade's Headquarters
  - 1st Artillery Battalion
  - 2nd Artillery Battalion
  - 3rd Artillery Battalion
  - Artillery Reconnaissance Battalion
  - Engineer Company
  - Maintenance Company
  - Logistic Company
  - Signal Company
  - Radar Company
  - Medical Company
  - CBRN Protection Company
