= Oleksa Almaziv =

Military officer

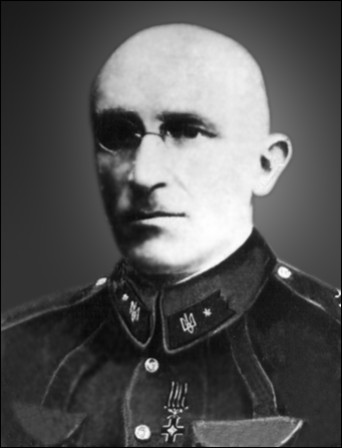
- Native name: Олекса Алмазів
- Born: 6 January 1886; Volodymyrivka, Kherson Governorate, Russian Empire (now Ukraine)
- Died: 13 December 1936 (aged 50) Lutsk, Volhynian Voivodeship, Second Polish Republic
- Allegiance: Russian Empire; Ukrainian People's Republic
- Branch: Imperial Russian Army; Ukrainian People's Army
- Service years: 1905-1917; 1917–1921
- Commands: 1st Horse Mountain Artillery Division; Separate Horse Mountain Artillery Battery (division)
- Conflicts: World War I; Kerensky Offensive; Ukrainian War of Independence; Soviet–Ukrainian War; Battle of Kiev (1918); First Winter Campaign; Polish-Soviet War

Oleksa (Oleksiy) Dmytrovych Almazov (Almaziv, 6 January 1886 – 13 December 1936) was a military officer who served as General Khorunzhy in the army of the Ukrainian People's Republic. Having started his career in the Imperial Russian Army, after the revolution he became a major organizer of the Ukrainian artillery force, taking part in the Ukrainian War of Independence. Afterwards, he emigrated to Czechoslovakia and then to Poland, eventually settling in Polish-ruled Volhynia.

In 2018 Almazov's name was awarded to the 406th brigade of the Ukrainian Armed Forces.

== Biography ==
Almazov was born on 6 January 1886 in Volodymyrivka, Kherson Governorate (modern-day Mykolaiv Oblast. He studied at a real school in Tiflis and graduated from the Mikhailovskaya Military Artillery Academy in Saint Petersburg in 1907. Almazov took part in the First World War, commanding the 1st Horse Mountain Artillery Division. During the Kerensky Offensive in summer of 1917 Almazov's division distinguished itself in battles in the vicinity of Krevo, and in August he was presented with the Order of St. George, 4th class, and Order of St. Vladimir, 4th class. On 1 November of the same year Almazov was promoted to colonel.

During the autumn of 1917 Almazov took part in the Ukrainization of Russian Army units. On 1 January 1918 he was appointed commander of an artillery battery of the Sloboda Ukraine Haidamaka Kish, later part of the 1st Zaporizhian Regiment of Haidamaka Cavalry. In January 1918 Almazov took part in the battle for Kyiv, and in March of the same year his unit fought in Left-Bank Ukraine. After reaching Kharkiv, in late March 1918 the battery was reformed into a regiment, and under the regime of Pavlo Skoropadsky the unit became a full-fledged artillery division. In 1918-1919 Almazov participated in the First Winter Campaign. During the Polish-Soviet War in 1920 he fought as part of the Ukrainian army in battles on the rivers Dniester and Zbruch, and distinguished himself during an offensive on Zhmerynka. Following the internment of Ukrainian forces in Poland he received the rank of General Khorunzhy.

In 1923 Almazov moved to Czechoslovakia, where he studied at the Ukrainian Husbandry Academy in Poděbrady. During the 1930s Almazov lived in Lutsk, working as a hydrotechnical engineer, and took part in activities of the Ukrainian community in Volhynia. He died in 1936 in Lutsk.

== Honours and awards ==
Russian Empire

Order of St. George, 4th class
Order of St. Vladimir, 4th class

Ukrainian People's Republic

Iron Cross
Cross of Symon Petliura

== Sources ==
- Енциклопедія Історії України. Том 1: А–В / Київ: Наукова Думка, 2003. – с.67.
