= Ukrspecsystems =

Ukrainian military drone company

Coordinates: 50.434562°N 30.510813°E

- Native name: Укрспецсистемс
- Type: LLC
- Industry: Arms industry
- Founded: 2014; 12 years ago in Ukraine
- Founder: Vyacheslav Kostyuk
- Headquarters: Kyiv, Ukraine
- Key people: Dmytro Khasapov
- Products: Unmanned combat aerial vehicles
- Website: ukrspecsystems.com

Ukrspecsystems /ˌjuːˈkrspɛkˈsɪstəmz/ (also written as UkrSpecSystems) is a Ukrainian company that makes unmanned combat aerial vehicles (UCAV).

== History ==
The company was founded in 2014 by Kostyuk Vyacheslav Nikolaevich at the beginning of the Russian occupation of Crimea.

Introduced the Mini Shark combat drone at International Defence Industry Fair 2023 in Istanbul.

In February 2026, the first plant of the Ukrspecsystems production complex will begin operations in London.

== Products ==
PD-2 has a range of 200 km with 8 hours of flight time and 55 kg maximum takeoff weight. It has a 5-meter wingspan.

Shark has a range of 60 km with 4 hours of flight time and 12 kg maximum takeoff weight. It has a 4-meter wingspan.

Mini Shark has a range of 30 km with 2 hours of flight time and 5 kg maximum takeoff weight. It has a 2-meter wingspan.

== See also ==
- Ukrainian Defense Industry (Ukroboronprom)
