= 30th Marine Corps =

Ukrainian Ground Forces formation

- 30-й корпус морської піхоти
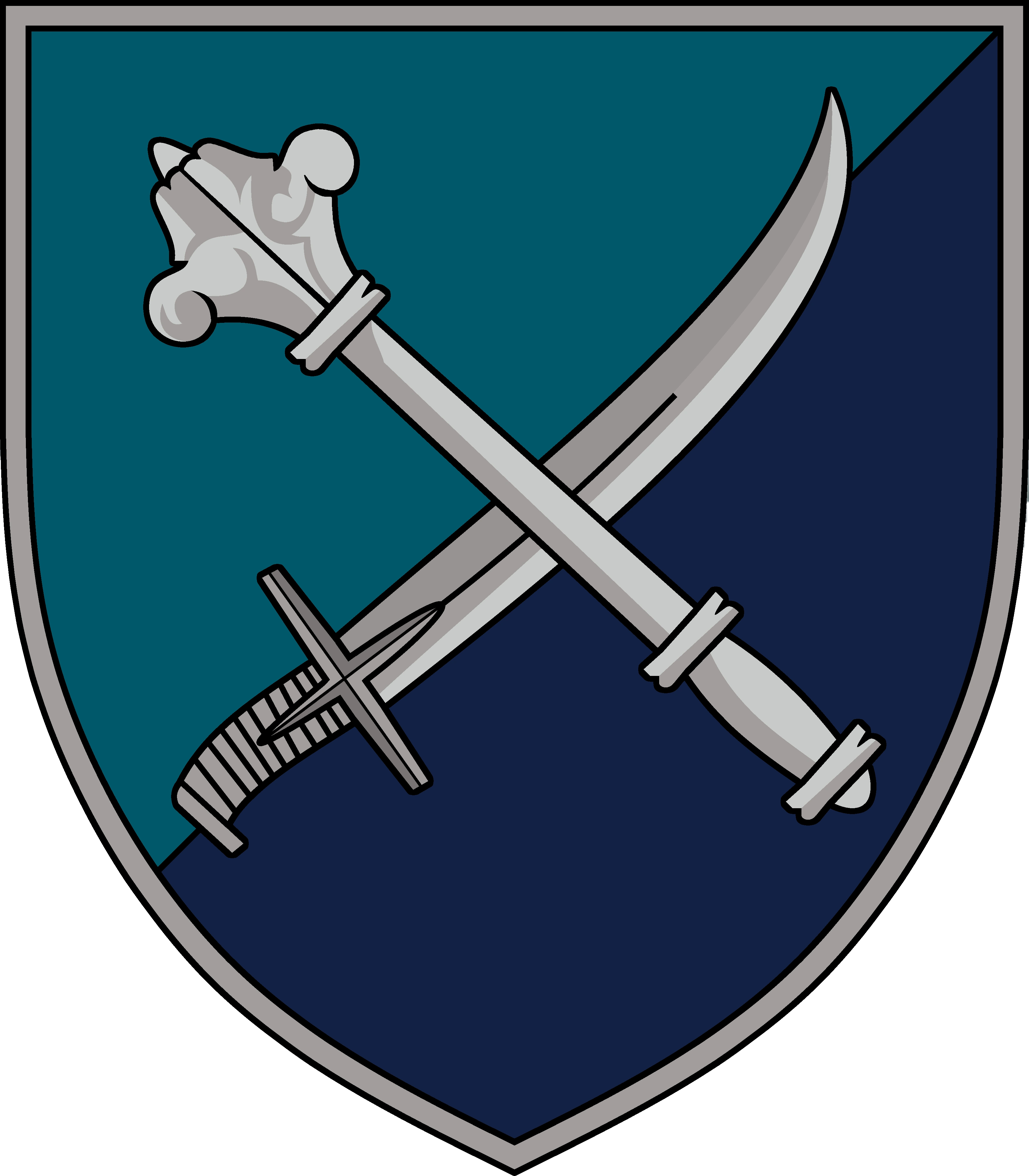
- Active: 16 March 2024 – Present
- Country: Ukraine
- Branch: Ukrainian Marine Corps
- Type: Corps
- Size: 40,000 - 80,000
- Part of: Marine Corps Command
- Motto: Always Faithful
- Engagements: Russo-Ukrainian War
- Website: Official Facebook page

Commanders
- Current commander: Col. Serhii Shatalov

The 30th Marine Corps (Ukrainian: 30-й корпус морської піхоти) is a Corps of the Ukrainian Marine Corps.

== History ==
The Corps was created on 16 March 2024. The purpose of the Corps is to unify all marine units under a single command, marking a enhancement in Ukraine's defense capabilities. The establishment of the 30th Marine Corps is part of a broader effort to modernize and align Ukrainian forces with NATO standards, as evidenced by the creation of NATO-style corps units for the first time in a major reorganization.

As of March 2025, the Marine Corps only performed administrative functions, because unlike the other corps formed as part of the Ukrainian military reorganization, its constituent brigades were operating on different parts of the front line. In August 2025, it was reported that elements of the 30th Marine Corps held a defensive line on the left bank of the Dnieper River near the city of Kherson.

== Structure ==
As of 2026 the corps structure is as follows:

- 30th Marine Corps
  - Corps Headquarters
    - Management
    - Headquarters Battalion
  - 101st Anti-Aircraft Missile Division
  - 7th Anti-Aircraft Division
  - 15th Support Regiment
  - 18th Anti-Tank Battalion
  - 32nd Artillery Brigade
  - 34th Marine Brigade
  - 35th Marine Brigade
  - 36th Marine Brigade
  - 37th Marine Brigade
  - 38th Marine Brigade
  - 39th Marine Brigade
  - 40th Marine Brigade
  - 67th Logistics Battalion
  - 140th Reconnaissance Battalion
  - 310th Electronic Warfare Battalion
  - 380th Reserve Marine Battalion
  - 406th Artillery Brigade
  - 426th Unmanned Systems Regiment
