= 7th Anti-Aircraft Divizion =

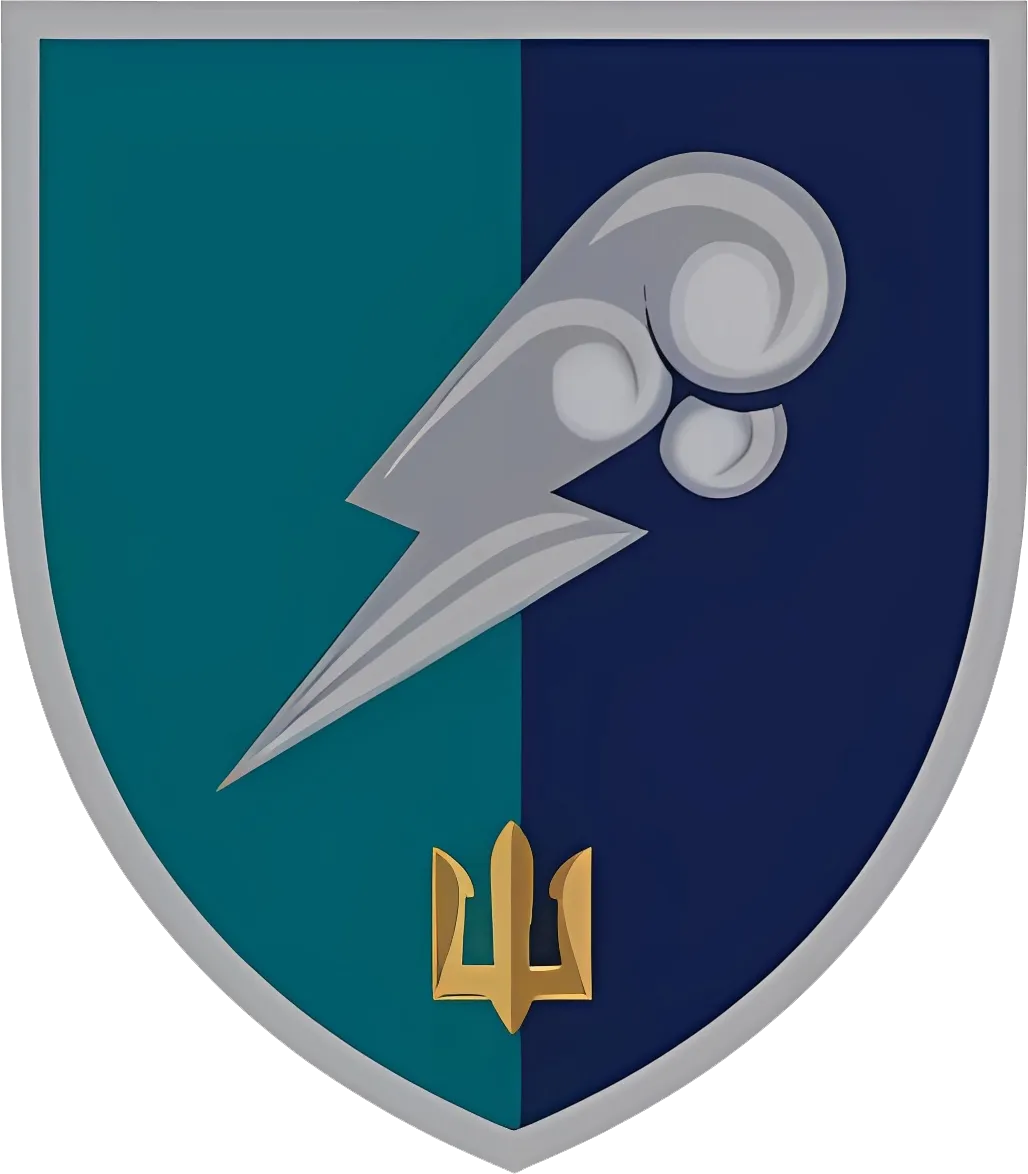
- Battalion insignia
- Active: January 20, 2019 – present
- Country: Ukraine
- Branch: Ukrainian Marine Corps
- Type: Marines anti-aircraft unit
- Role: Air defense
- Size: Divizion (Equal to Battalion)
- Part of: 30th Marine Corps
- Garrison/HQ: Ochakiv
- Engagements: Russo-Ukrainian War

The 7th Anti-Aircraft Divizion (Ukrainian: 7-й окремий зенітний ракетний дивізіон) is a marines anti-aircraft unit divizion unit of 30th Marine Corps, Ukrainian Marine Corps.

== History ==
Operationally under the command of the 30th Marine Corps. The Battalion was established in 2019 and is based in Ochakiv, it has seen combat during the Russian invasion of Ukraine.

It was established in 2019 as a separate Anti-aircraft missile regiment for the Ukrainian Marine Corps, armed and equipped with modified and modernized S-125-2D1 anti-aircraft missile systems, headquartered in Ochakiv.

== Structure ==
The structure of the divizion is as follows:

- 7th Anti-Aircraft Divizion
  - Management & Headquarters
  - 1st Anti-aircraft Battery
  - 2nd Anti-aircraft Battery
  - Guardian units
  - Commandant Platoon
  - Repair platoon
