= 406th Marine Artillery Brigade (Ukraine) =

406th Artillery Brigade (2016–present) 406th Separate Artillery Group (2006–2016) 406th Separate Brigade Artillery Group (2003–06) 406th Artillery Regiment (2001–03) 301st Artillery Brigade (1976–2001)
- 406-а окрема артилерійська бригада імені Олекси Алмазова
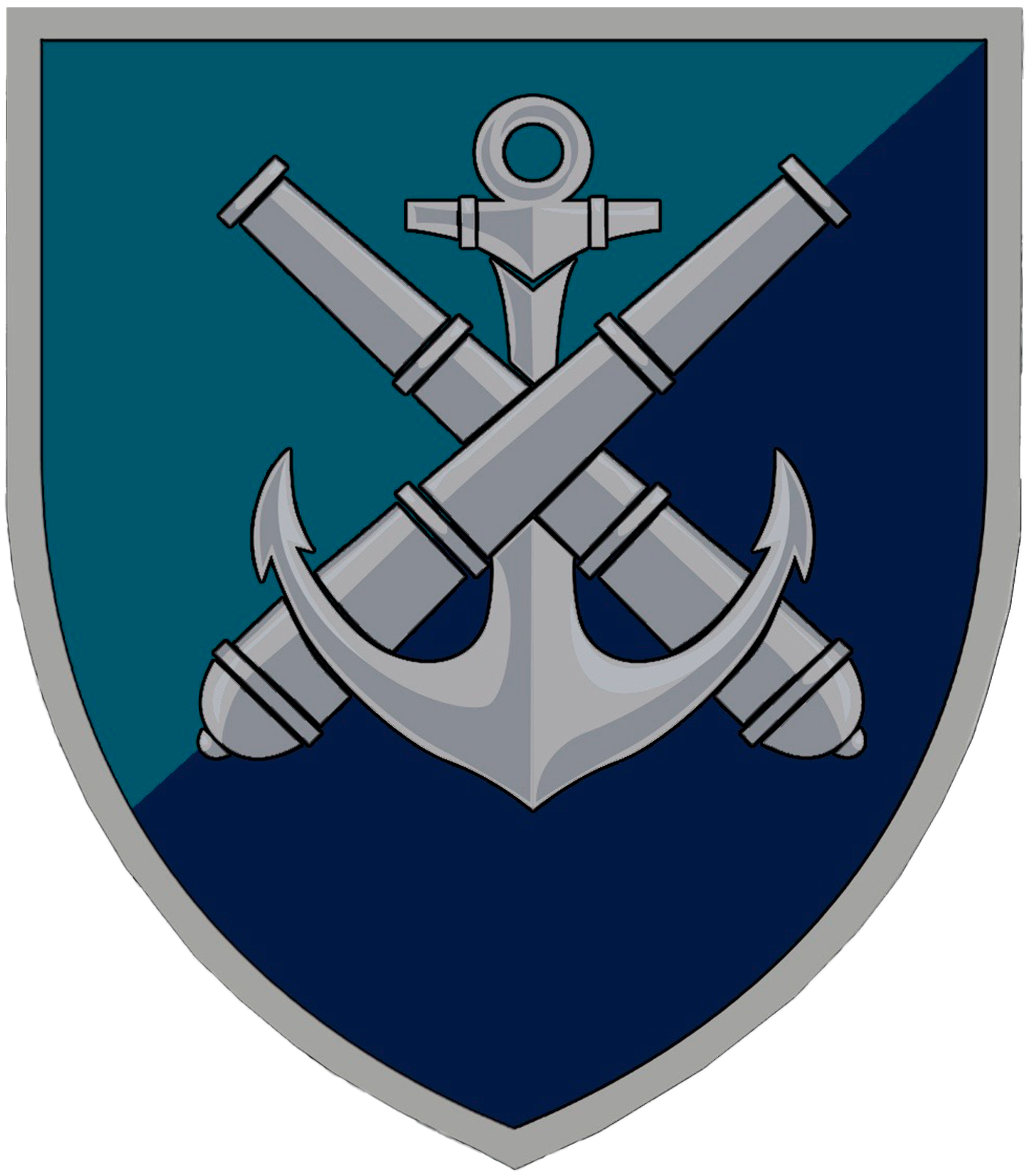
- Brigade Insignia
- Active: March 17, 2015 – present
- Country: Ukraine
- Allegiance: Armed Forces of Ukraine
- Branch: Ukrainian Marine Corps
- Type: Brigade
- Role: Artillery and fire support
- Part of: 30th Marine Corps
- Garrison/HQ: Mykolaiv, Mykolaiv Oblast
- Patron: Oleksa Almaziv
- Motto: We are the gods of war!
- Engagements: Russo-Ukrainian War

Commanders
- Current commander: Andriy Shubin

Insignia
- Flag

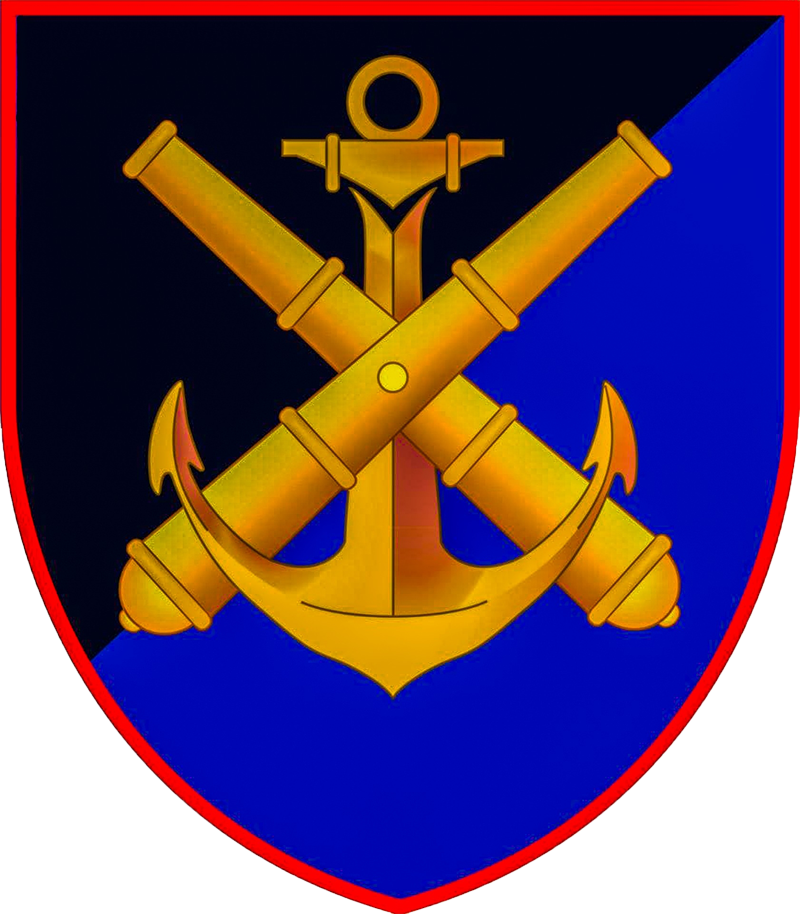
- Former insignia

The 406th Artillery Brigade "Ensign General Oleksa Almaziv" is a brigade of the Ukrainian Marine Corps. It was established in 1976 as a part of the Soviet Armed Forces and was transferred to Ukraine following its independence. It was originally a part of the Ukrainian Navy and became a part of the Marine Corps after its formation. It is currently based at Mykolaiv.

== History ==
In April 1976, it was established as the 301st Artillery Brigade in Zaporizhzhia. In 1983, it was transferred to Simferopol as a part of 32nd Army Corps and was transferred to the Black Sea Fleet in 1983. In March 1993 after the independence of Ukraine, it was transferred to the 32nd Army Corps of the Odessa Military District, becoming 406th Artillery Regiment in 2001 and then 406th Separate Brigade Artillery Group in 2003 and later 406th Separate Coastal Artillery Group in 2006, eventually becoming 406th Separate Simferopol Coastal Artillery Group in 2011.

On February 28, 2014, during the Russian Invasion of Crimea the Russian troops encircled the brigade. Half of the officers defected to Russia and 73 servicemen arrived back in Zaporizhzhia on 9 April. The commander of the unit, Dmytro Kozachenko himself also defected to Russia.

On April 15, 2015, it was transferred to Mykolaiv.

32nd Rocket Artillery Regiment split from the brigade in 2016.

On August 24, 2016, the brigade received a combat flag.

On August 22, 2018, the brigade was awarded the honorary title of "Corporal General Oleksiy Almazov"

On July 10, 2019, the brigade took part in combat action in Granitny, separatists launched anti-tank missiles upon the brigade's positions killing a soldier of the brigade.

During the Russo-Ukrainian war, the brigade participated in the 2022 Kharkiv counteroffensive for which it received commendation from Volodymyr Zelenskyy. The brigade also participated in the Battle of Davydiv Brid carrying out precise strikes against Russian positions.

On 22 January 2026, in Moscow, the Second Western District Military Court formally acknowledged that the Russian cruiser Moskva was sunk by a Ukrainian missile, and accused Andrii Shubin, then commander of 406th Artillery Brigade of the Ukrainian Navy, of giving the orders that led to the sinking of the Moskva. Updated casualties were listed as 20 crew members killed, 24 injured and eight missing. Shubin was also accused of causing minor damage to the frigate Admiral Essen in April 2022. The “court demanded 2.2 billion rubles (approximately $28.4 million) in damages” for the Admiral Essen from Shubin.

== Structure ==
The structure of the brigade is as follows.

- Headquarters and HQ Battery
- FDC and TAG Battery
- Artillery Reconnaissance and Observer Battalion
- 64th Marine Gun Artillery Battalion
  - 1st Artillery battery
  - 2nd Artillery battery
  - 3rd Artillery battery
  - Maintenance platoon
  - Anti-aircraft platoon
  - Medical center
- 65th Marine Coastal Defense Missile Battalion
- 66th Marine Cannon Artillery Battalion
  - HHBty
  - 1st Artillery battery
  - 2nd Artillery battery
  - 3rd Artillery battery
  - Logistical platoon
  - Anti-aircraft missile platoon
  - Security platoon
  - Medical center
  - Club
- 67th Marine Cannon Artillery Battalion
  - HHBty
  - 1st Artillery battery
  - 2nd gun Artillery battery
  - 3rd gun Artillery battery
  - Maintenance platoon
  - Security platoon
  - Medical center
- Combat engineer company
- Logistical company
- Artillery maintenance company
- Artillery security company
- Military police platoon
- Brigade Band

== Equipment ==
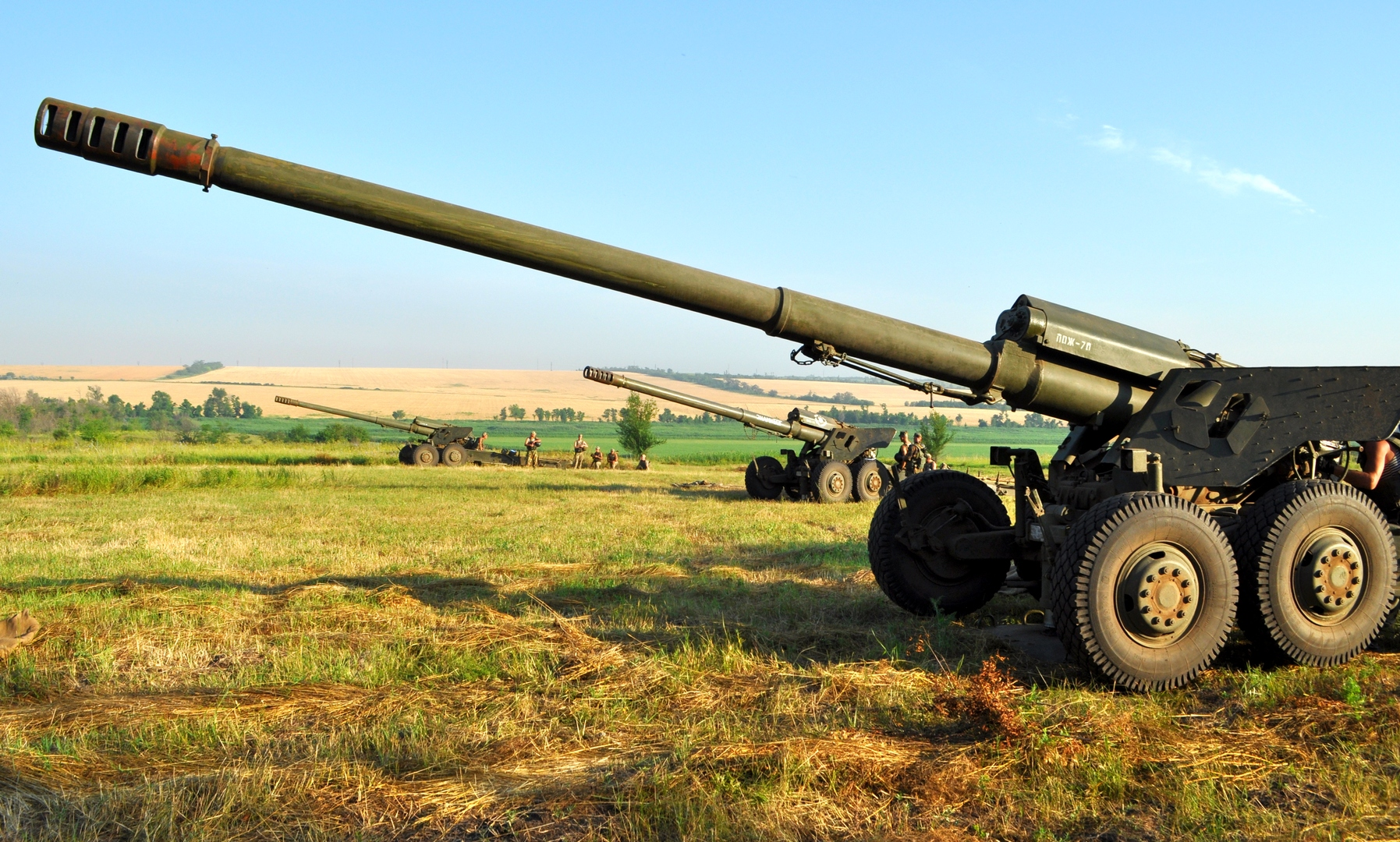
2A36 Giatsint-B of the Brigade

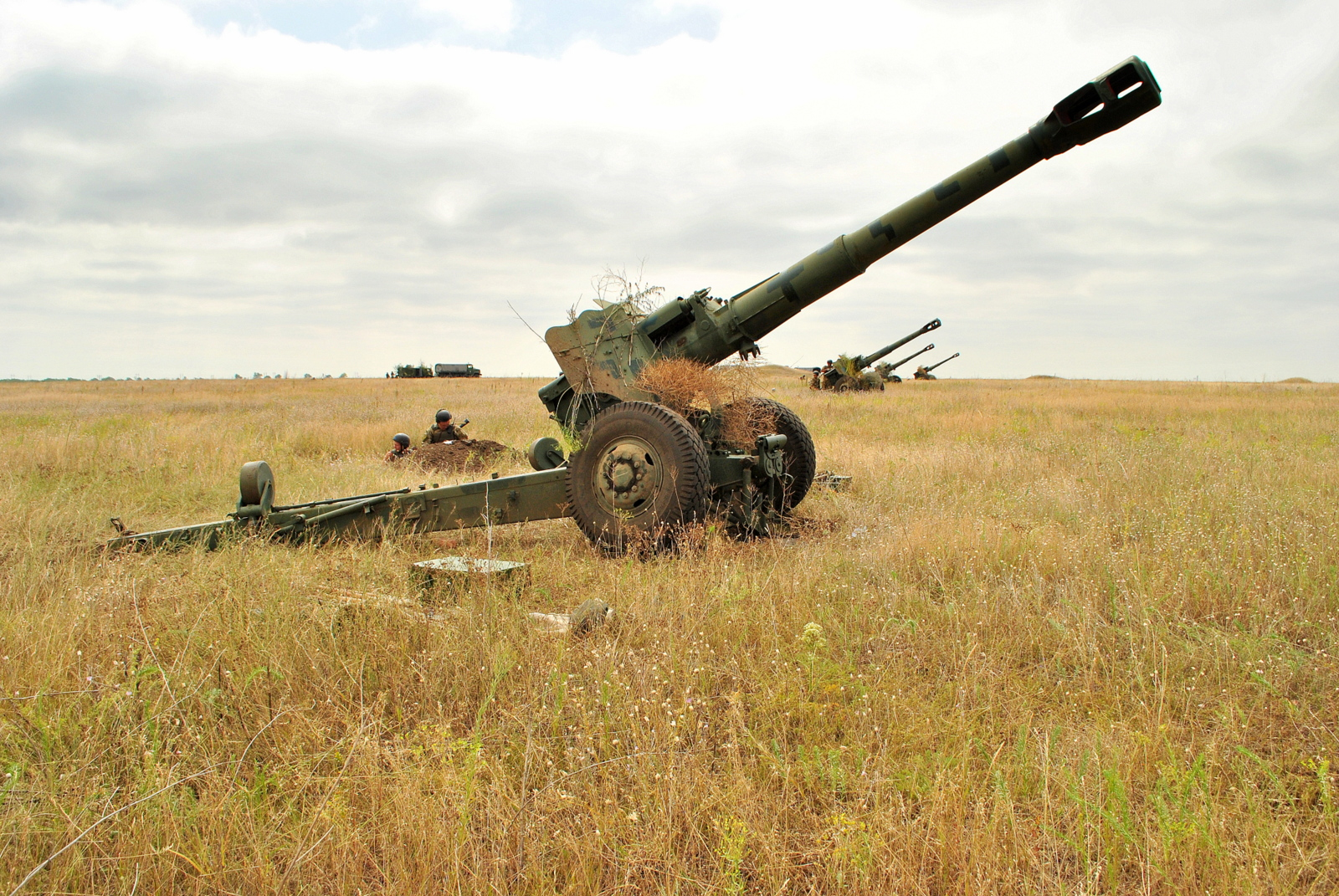
152 mm gun-howitzer D-20 of the brigade

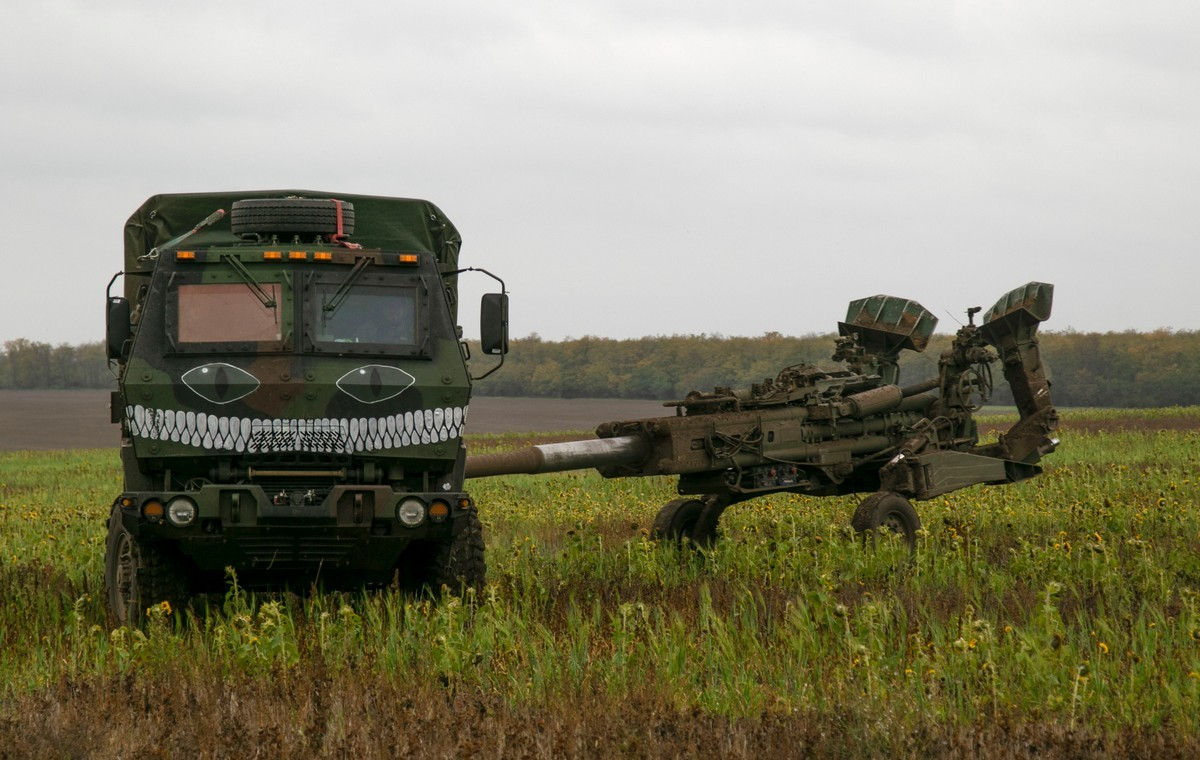
M777 and FMTV of the Brigade's elite subunit Cheshire Cats

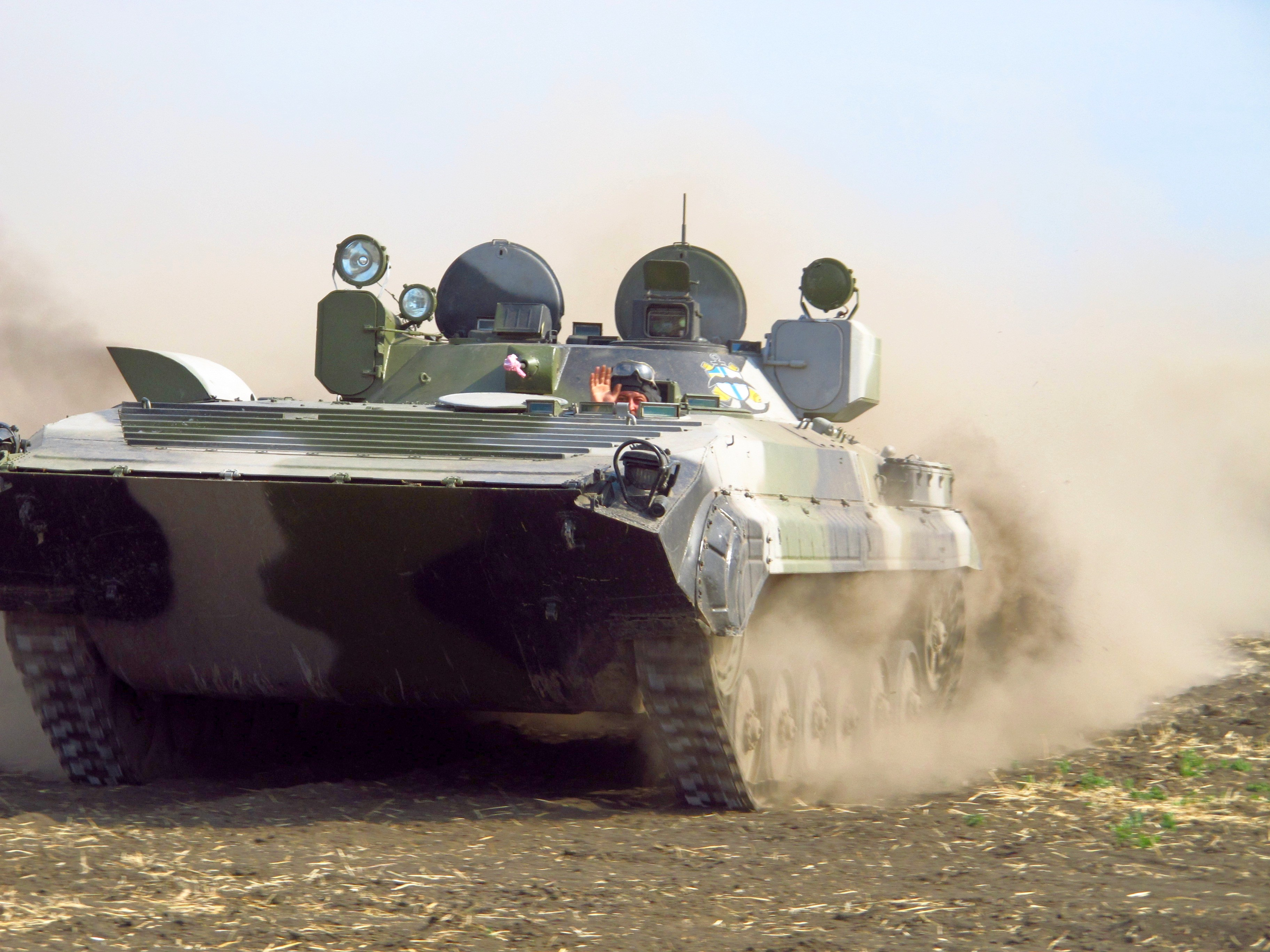
PRP-4 of the brigade

- 152mm D-20 Gun howitzers
- 2A36 Giatsint-Bs
- M777 howitzers
- FMTV-Bs
- PRP-4 Armored Vehicles

== Commanders ==
- Ivan Mykolayovych (1976–1986)
- Volodymyr Kostiantynovych Fomenko (1986–1988)
- Boris Mykhailovych Kozhevnikov (1988–1994)
- Oleksandr Ivanovich Gurin (1994–1998)
- Mykola Petrovych Dumenko (1998–2001)
- Evgeny Viktorovych Dobrynin (2001–2008)
- Dmytro Genadiyovych Kozachenko (surrendered) (2008–2014)
- Evgeny Viktorovych Dobrynin (2014–2016)
- Andrii Volodymyrovych Shubin (2016-)

=== Subunit commanders ===
==== 64th Gun Artillery Division ====
- Serhii Volodymyrovych Sosyedskyi (2016-)

==== 65th Coastal Missile Division ====
- Yury Yaroslavovych Yatskevich (2016-)

==== 66th Cannon Artillery Division ====
- Ihor Vasylovich Gerasimchuk (2016–2019)
- Stroganov Evgeny Volodymyrovych (2019-)

==== 67th Cannon Artillery Division ====
- Yuriy Mykolayovych Olovyanikov (2016–2018)
- Victor Pogorelov (2018–2022)
- Oleksandr Anatoliyovych Krotov (2022-)

== Sources ==
- 406 ОБАГ тривога
- Відео:406 ОАБр 2 й дивізіон служба за контрактом
- Відео: ОБАГ 406 ОБНОВЛЕНИЕ
- Відео: ОКРЕМА АРТИЛЕРІЙСЬКА БРИГАДА
- 406-та берегова артилерійська група
- Крим: історія одного підрозділу в долях людей
- Рішення про переміщення окремих підрозділів 406 артбригади з казарм до наметового містечка обумовлене службовою необхідністю
- Береговые артиллеристы ВМСУ восстанавливают военный городок в Аккермане
- В Аккерман из зоны АТО прибыли береговые артиллеристы
- Херсонські артилеристи показали свою майстерність
- Артилерійські підрозділи ВМС ЗС України виконали бойові стрільби в рамках тактичних навчань
- "Букет із крупного калібру: артилерія ЗСУ готова зіграти свою роль у звільненні Донбасу". narodna-pravda.ua/. Народна правда. 2017-08-14. Archived from the original on 2017-08-14.
- До Дня захисника України в Білгород-Дністровському урочисто відкрили нову казарму для артилерійського підрозділу військ берегової оборони ВМС
- На Одещині для берегових артилеристів ВМС ЗС України відновлюють фонди військових містечок
- На Одещині артилеристи ВМС ЗС України врятували громадян та новонароджене дитя зі снігової блокади
- "Морські артилеристи проведуть стрільби на Азовському та Чорному морях". mil.in.ua/. 2018-06-08. Archived from the original on 12 June 2018.
