= EcoFlow =

Rechargeable portable batteries

- Type: Portable solar generators Portable power stations
- Inventor: Bruce Wang
- Inception: 2017
- Available: Yes
- Models: DELTA, DELTA Pro, DELTA Max，DELTA Mini, RIVER, RIVER Pro, RIVER Max
- Website: www.ecoflow.com

EcoFlow is a Chinese company that develops portable power stations, smart devices, and home energy systems, established in 2017.

== History ==
EcoFlow was founded in May 2017 by Bruce Wang. They started with the launch of the RIVER mobile power station. By 2019, the company expanded to Tokyo, Japan and introduced the DELTA 1300 with faster charging. The following year, in 2020, the RIVER series followed, offering smart energy management features. In 2021, EcoFlow released the DELTA Pro. During this time, the company also launched its first Smart Home Panel and reached a $1 billion valuation. In 2022, EcoFlow introduced the WAVE mobile air conditioner, Power Kits, DELTA 2 and RIVER 2 series.

In 2025, EcoFlow recalled 25,000 EcoFlow Delta Max 2000 power stations due to risk of fire.

== Awards and recognition ==
- 2023 Australian Good Design Awards – Multiple products
- 2023 Red Dot Design Award – DELTA 2 Series
- 2023 iF Design Award – EcoFlow Power Kits
