= Ukrspecsystems PD-2 =

Ukrainian multi-purpose unmanned aerial vehicle

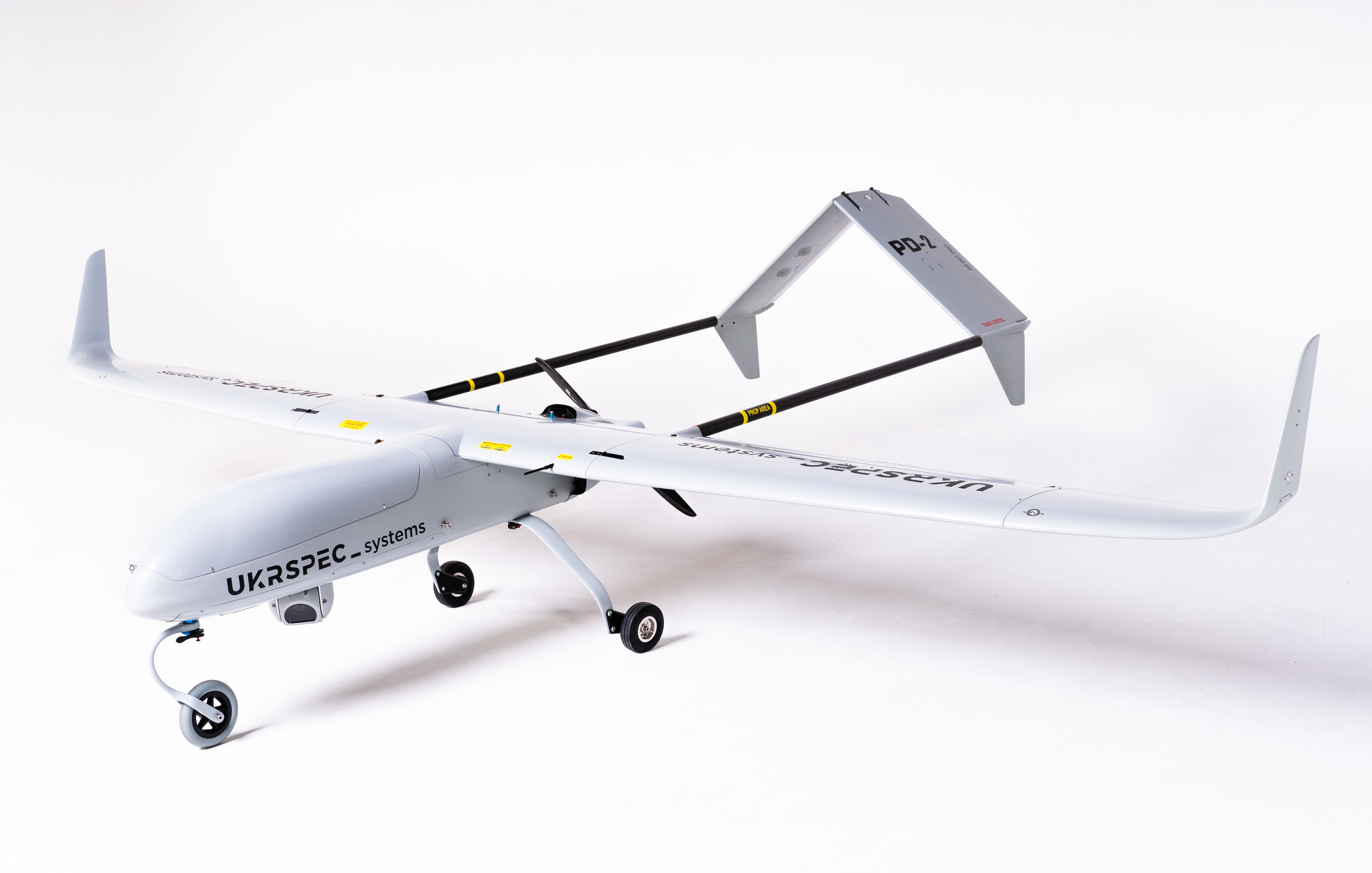
- PD-2

General information
- Type: Unmanned surveillance and reconnaissance aerial vehicle
- National origin: Ukraine
- Manufacturer: Ukrspecsystems
- Status: In service
- Primary user: Armed Forces of Ukraine

History
- Manufactured: 20+
- First flight: 2019
- Developed from: Ukrspecsystems PD-1

Ukrspecsystems PD-2 is a Ukrainian multi-purpose unmanned aerial vehicle (UAV). It is designed for aerial reconnaissance and for combat use as a carrier of bombs with warheads weighing up to 3 kg (6.6 lb). The aircraft can take off from a runway, or be equipped with removable modules for vertical take-off and landing.

== History ==
Starting from the Russo-Ukrainian War in 2014, the Armed Forces of Ukraine saw the need for unmanned aerial vehicles, primarily for reconnaissance. Volunteers purchased civilian drones, which they used as-is or modified for military use.

The People's Project volunteer organisation was established to help the Ukrainian military in eastern Ukraine. In attempting to import modern UAVs, the organisation faced reluctance from some foreign companies to sell their devices. As an alternative, the unmanned aerial vehicle PD-1 was developed in cooperation with Ukrspecsystems. "PD" stands for "People's Drone".

In 2020, Ukrspecsystems developed the PD-2 drone, which is a deep modernisation of the PD-1 with increased payload, communication range and other improvements. It can climb to 3,000 metres (9,800 ft) and fly for up to 10 hours. It has a modular design that allows additional motors to be fitted to convert it from runway take-off to vertical take-off and landing.

== Components and features ==
1. Two reconnaissance UAVs;
2. ground control station;
3. mobile control post on the basis of a four-wheel drive minibus.
