= DeViRo Leleka-100 =

Ukrainian unmanned aerial vehicle (UAV)

Leleka-100
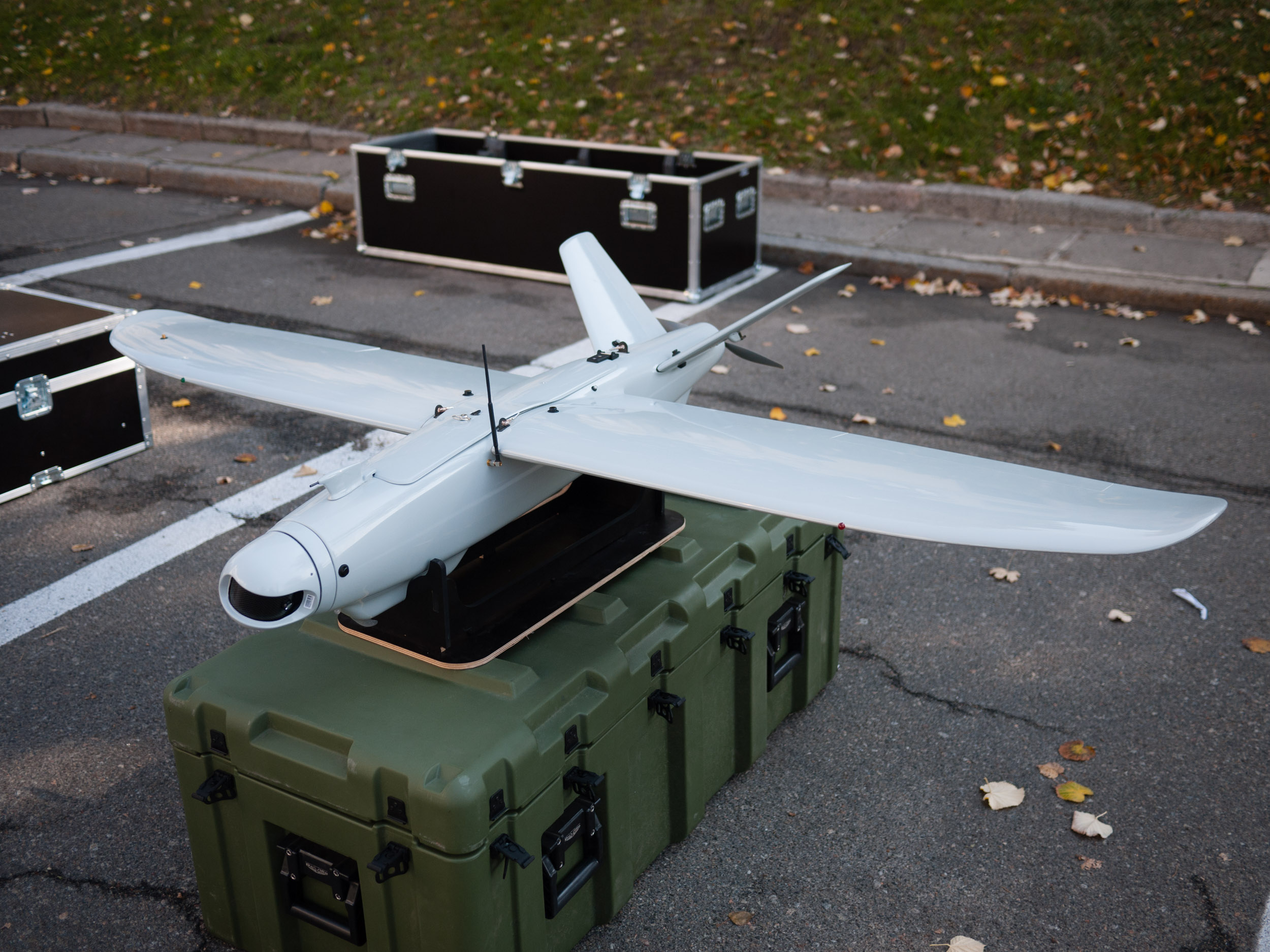
- Leleka-100

General information
- Type: Reconnaissance UAV
- National origin: Ukraine
- Manufacturer: DeViRo
- Primary user: Armed Forces of Ukraine

History
- Introduction date: 2015

Leleka-100 (Ukrainian: Лелека-100), also known as Stork, is a Ukrainian unmanned aerial vehicle (UAV) designed for air reconnaissance. It was commissioned by the Armed Forces of Ukraine in 2021 and has been used extensively during the 2022 Russian invasion of Ukraine. It served as a base for the RAM II loitering munition.
