= Ukrspecsystems Shark =

Ukrainian unmanned aerial vehicle

Shark
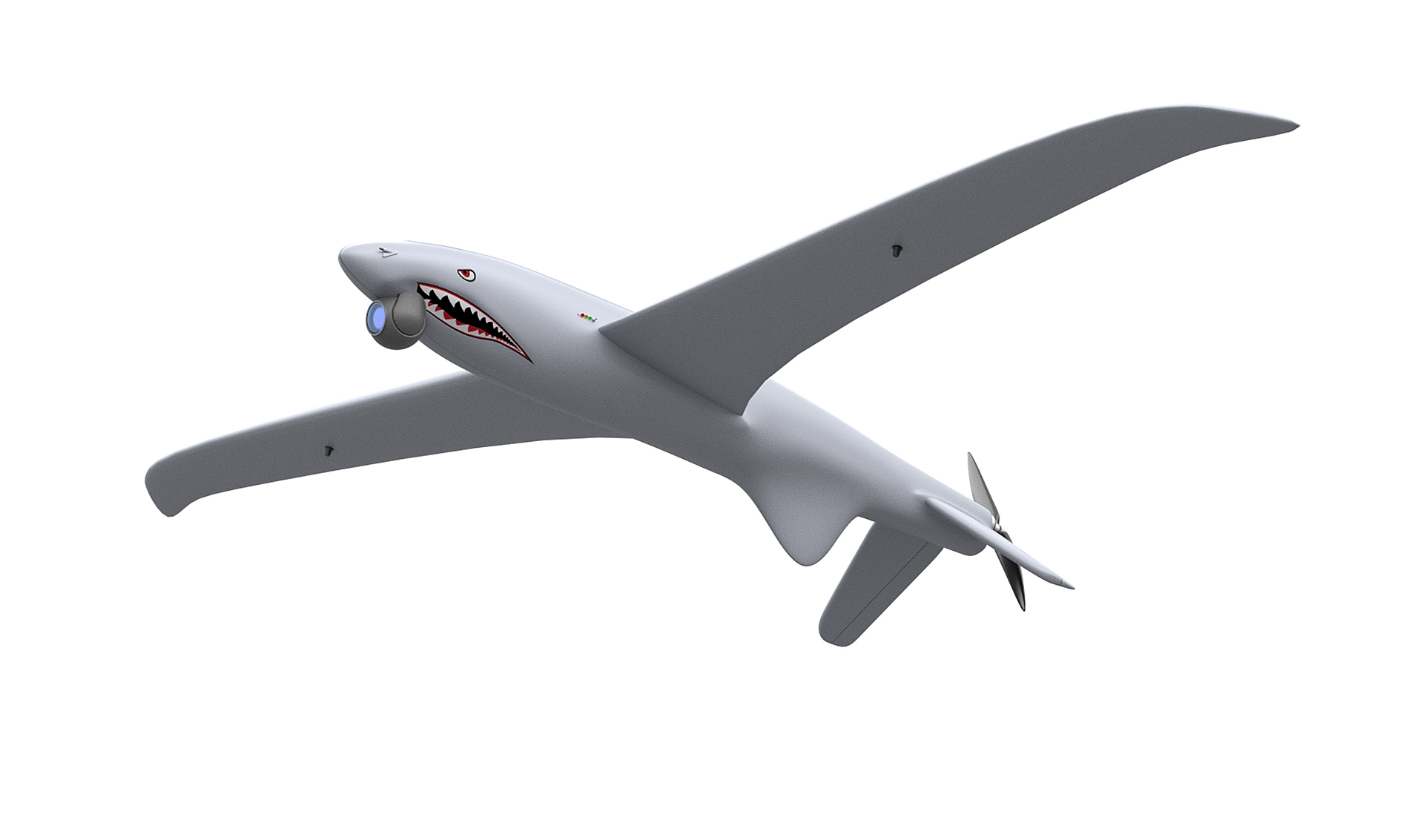
- Shark drone

General information
- Type: Reconnaissance UAV
- National origin: Ukraine
- Manufacturer: Ukrspecsystems
- Primary user: Armed Forces of Ukraine

History
- Introduction date: 2022

SHARK (Ukrainian: ШАРК) is a Ukrainian unmanned aerial vehicle created by the Ukrspecsystems company for monitoring and adjusting fire on the battlefield. The UAV is equipped with a communication module using AES256 encryption, which allows it to penetrate into the enemy's rear up to 80 km under EW conditions. The Full HD optical-electronic surveillance complex with 30× optical magnification and an additional 3× digital zoom enables surveillance at a distance of up to 5 km from the drone to the target.

Approximate cost - US$325,000 (Three UAVs and a vehicle with a command post).

== Description ==
Shark combines the war-tested technologies and experience of using larger operational-tactical UAVs of the PD-1 and PD-2 series in combat conditions. The UAV is launched from a catapult and has an operational range of up to 80 km, rising to a height of up to 3,000 meters. Its maximum speed is 130 km/h, cruising speed is 75 km/h, stall speed is 60 km/h. Landing is carried out using a parachute.

UAVs are able to adjust large-caliber artillery for a long time, resistant to EW countermeasures and difficult weather conditions. It is possible to operate multiple units from a single station.

The complex of BpAS "Shark" includes:

- 3 UAVs
- Ground launcher
- Additional equipment

== History of creation ==
The Ukrspecsystems company began work on the Shark UAV in the face of a full-scale Russian invasion on February 24, 2022, and flight tests began less than six months later.

== Specifications ==
Characteristic	SHARK UAS
Communication range	80 km
Cruise speed	75 km/h
Maximum flight speed	130 km/h
Maximum flight range	~300 km
Stall speed	60 km/h
Ceiling	3000 m
The weight of the device	12.5 kg
Wingspan	3.4 m
Operating temperature	from −15 °C to +50 °C

=== Camera system ===
Different video recording modules can be installed on the aircraft: USG-231 and USG-231-T.

Characteristic	USG-231	USG-231-T
Appointment	Day vision camera Full HD with 30× optical zoom	Night vision camera with an uncooled thermal imaging module
Digital approximation	3×	4 p
Digital stabilization	Yes	Yes
Protection against fogging	Yes	No
Video recording and storage aboard	Yes	Yes
Rotation along the axis	No	360°
Size, mm	105×107×120	105×107×120
Weight, g	590	635

== Operators ==
- Ukraine

== Combat use ==
In 2022, Serhiy Prytula Charity Foundation announced the purchase of a SHARK UAV for Ukraine's Armed Forces. By 2023, they had acquired three SHARK systems. On November 1, 2022, OKKO and the "Come Back Alive" Foundation initiated a fundraiser to buy 25 SHARK systems, totaling 325,000,000 UAH or 13 million UAH per system. These systems include 75 UAVs, 25 Torsus vehicles from Pulsar Expo with control points, and 25 launch setups. A notable project involved retrofitting the Torsus Terrastorm vehicle for remote piloting. This upgraded vehicle is optimized for wartime, offering efficient operations in any weather and rapid deployment.

== See also ==
- RAM-2X
