= BIR =

BIR or Bir may refer to:

== Acronyms (BIR) ==
- Bangladesh Infantry Regiment
- Rapid Intervention Brigade (French: Brigade d'Intervention Rapide), Cameroon military unit
- Bilhete de Identidade de Residente, Macau identity card
- Brainerd International Raceway, Minnesota, USA
- British Institute of Radiology
- Birmingham International Raceway, Alabama, US
- Board of Invention and Research, UK Admiralty, WWI
- Burma's IOC country code
- Bureau of Internal Revenue, Philippines tax agency
- Baculovirus Inhibitor of apoptosis protein Repeat, in some proteins
- Bir railway station's station code
- Biratnagar Airport, IATA code BIR

== Proper names (Bir) ==
- Bir (film), 2020, Bangladesh
- Bir (Mezarkabul album)
- Bir (Hepsi album), Turkey, 2005
- Bir, Himachal Pradesh, town in India
- Bir, Madhya Pradesh
- Bir, Iran, a village in Fars Province
- Bir-e Bala, a village in Sistan and Baluchestan Province, Iran
- Bir-e Rasul Bakhsh, a village in Sistan and Baluchestan Province, Iran
- Bir-e Sofla, a village in Sistan and Baluchestan Province, Iran
- Bir, alternate name of Birdaf, a village in Sistan and Baluchestan Province, Iran
- Bir Ma'in, a Palestinian Arab village in the Ramle Subdistrict
- Bir Ghbalou District, a district of Bouïra Province, Algeria
- Bir Moghrein Airport, Tiris Zemmour region of Mauritania
- Bir Salim, a Palestinian Arab village in the Ramle Subdistrict
- Bir Tawil, an unclaimed area between Egypt and Sudan
- Bir Tibetan Colony, refugee settlement in Himachal Pradesh, India
- Bir Tungal, hill area in Himachal Pradesh, India
- Beed, Maharashtra, India, also known as Bir
- Birecik, town on the Euphrates in Turkey, also known as Bir
- Rosette Bir (1926–1992), French sculptor

== See also ==
- Bir Sreshtho, Bir Uttom, Bir Bikrom, and Bir Protik, Bangladeshi military awards
