= Bandar-e Tang =

Village in Sistan and Baluchestan province, Iran

Bandar-e Tang Persian: بندر تنگ
- Village
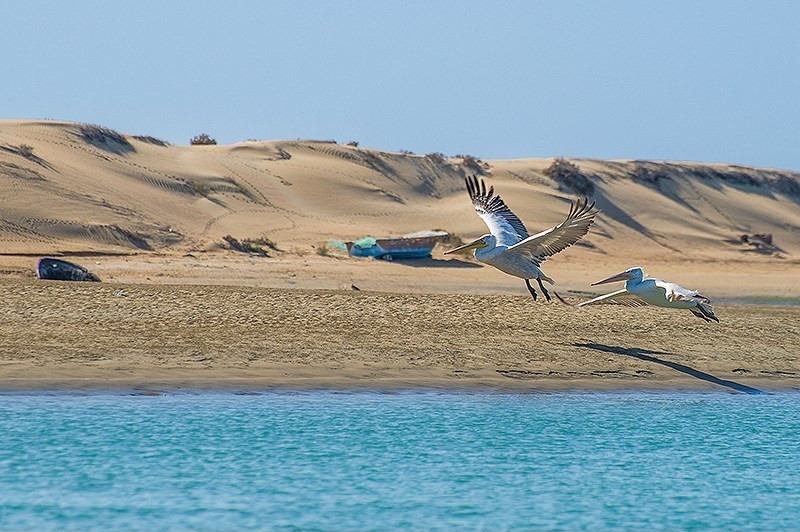

- Location within Iran
- Coordinates: 25°21′34″N 59°53′25″E
- Country: Iran
- Province: Sistan and Baluchestan
- County: Konarak
- District: Kahir
- Rural District: Tang

Population (2016)
  - Total: 1,504
- Time zone: UTC+3:30 (IRST)

Bandar-e Tang (Persian: بندرتنگ) (Note: Also romanized as Bandar Tang; also known as Bandar Tānk, Bandar-e Tank, Tang, and Tānk) is a village in, and the capital of, Tang Rural District of Kahir District, Konarak County, Sistan and Baluchestan province, Iran.

== Demographics ==
=== Population ===
At the time of the 2006 National Census, the village's population was 1,005 in 171 households, when it was in Kahir Rural District of the Central District. The following census in 2011 counted 1,080 people in 214 households. The 2016 census measured the population of the village as 1,504 people in 343 households.

After the census, the rural district was separated from the district in the formation of Kahir District, and Bandar-e Tang was transferred to Tang Rural District created in the new district.
