= Bavaridan =

Bavaridan باوريدن
- Village
- Location within Iran
- Coordinates: 25°33′18″N 60°16′49″E
- Country: Iran
- Province: Sistan and Baluchestan
- County: Konarak
- Bakhsh: Central
- Rural District: Jahliyan

Population (2006)
  - Total: 229
- Time zone: UTC+3:30 (IRST)
  - Summer (DST): UTC+4:30 (IRDT)

Bavaridan (Persian: باوريدن, also Romanized as Bāvarīdān and Bāwaridan) is a village in Jahliyan Rural District, in the Central District of Konarak County, Sistan and Baluchestan province, Iran. At the 2006 census, its population was 229, in 50 families.
