= Muman, Iran =

Muman (Persian: مومان), also rendered as Moman, may refer to:

- Muman-e Bala
- Muman-e Pain
- Muman-e Vasat
