= Sergan =

Sergan سرگان
- Village
- Location within Iran
- Coordinates: 25°27′00″N 60°19′16″E
- Country: Iran
- Province: Sistan and Baluchestan
- County: Konarak
- Bakhsh: Central
- Rural District: Jahliyan

Population (2006)
  - Total: 467
- Time zone: UTC+3:30 (IRST)
  - Summer (DST): UTC+4:30 (IRDT)

Sergan (Persian: سرگان, also Romanized as Sergān; also known as Sīrgān and Sīrkān) is a village in Jahliyan Rural District, in the Central District of Konarak County, Sistan and Baluchestan Province, Iran. At the 2006 census, its population was 467, in 89 families.
