= Nokombokan =

Nokombokan نكمبكان
- Village
- Location within Iran
- Coordinates: 25°34′39″N 60°21′27″E
- Country: Iran
- Province: Sistan and Baluchestan
- County: Konarak
- Bakhsh: Central
- Rural District: Jahliyan

Population (2006)
  - Total: 382
- Time zone: UTC+3:30 (IRST)
  - Summer (DST): UTC+4:30 (IRDT)

Nokombokan (Persian: نكمبكان, also Romanized as Nokombokān) is a village in Jahliyan Rural District, in the Central District of Konarak County, Sistan and Baluchestan Province, Iran. At the 2006 census, its population was 382, in 74 families.
