= Tall-e Mishan =

Tall-e Mishan تلميشان
- Village
- Location within Iran
- Coordinates: 25°33′36″N 60°07′03″E
- Country: Iran
- Province: Sistan and Baluchestan
- County: Konarak
- Bakhsh: Central
- Rural District: Kahir

Population (2006)
  - Total: 317
- Time zone: UTC+3:30 (IRST)
  - Summer (DST): UTC+4:30 (IRDT)

Tall-e Mishan (Persian: تلميشان, also Romanized as Tall-e Mīshān) is a village in Kahir Rural District, in the Central District of Konarak County, Sistan and Baluchestan Province, Iran. At the 2006 census, its population was 317, in 46 families.
