= Taran, Sistan and Baluchestan =

Taran طران
- Village
- Location within Iran
- Coordinates: 25°34′38″N 59°56′51″E
- Country: Iran
- Province: Sistan and Baluchestan
- County: Konarak
- Bakhsh: Central
- Rural District: Kahir

Population (2006)
  - Total: 446
- Time zone: UTC+3:30 (IRST)
  - Summer (DST): UTC+4:30 (IRDT)

Taran (Persian: طران, also Romanized as Ţarān and Tarān) is a village in Kahir Rural District, in the Central District of Konarak County, Sistan and Baluchestan Province, Iran. At the 2006 census, its population was 446, in 81 families.
