= Chahar Biti =

Chahar Biti چهاربيتي
- Village
- Location within Iran
- Coordinates: 25°34′16″N 60°07′57″E
- Country: Iran
- Province: Sistan and Baluchestan
- County: Konarak
- Bakhsh: Central
- Rural District: Kahir

Population (2006)
  - Total: 333
- Time zone: UTC+3:30 (IRST)
  - Summer (DST): UTC+4:30 (IRDT)

Chahar Biti (Persian: چهاربيتي, also Romanized as Chahār Bītī; also known as Chahār Bīd, Chahār Bīdī, Charta Bīt, Kahīr, and Kahīr-e Chenār Bīd) is a village in Kahir Rural District, in the Central District of Konarak County, Sistan and Baluchestan province, Iran. At the 2006 census, its population was 333, in 62 families.
