= Bursar Heydari =

Village in Sistan and Baluchestan province, Iran

Bursar Heydari Persian: بورسر حيدري
- Village
- Location within Iran
- Coordinates: 25°35′00″N 60°06′35″E
- Country: Iran
- Province: Sistan and Baluchestan
- County: Konarak
- District: Kahir
- Rural District: Kahir

Population (2016)
  - Total: 868
- Time zone: UTC+3:30 (IRST)

Bursar Heydari (Persian: بورسر حيدري) (Note: Also known as Heydarabad (حيدرآباد)) is a village in, and the capital of, Kahir Rural District of Kahir District, Konarak County, Sistan and Baluchestan province, Iran. The previous capital of the rural district was the village of Kahir.

== Demographics ==
=== Population ===
At the time of the 2006 National Census, the village's population was 657 in 137 households, when it was in the Central District. The following census in 2011 counted 558 people in 134 households. The 2016 census measured the population of the village as 868 people in 200 households.

After the census, the rural district was separated from the district in the formation of Kahir District.
