= Jugin =

Jugin جوگين
- Village
- Location within Iran
- Coordinates: 25°43′25″N 59°57′38″E
- Country: Iran
- Province: Sistan and Baluchestan
- County: Konarak
- Bakhsh: Central
- Rural District: Kahir

Population (2006)
  - Total: 29
- Time zone: UTC+3:30 (IRST)
  - Summer (DST): UTC+4:30 (IRDT)

Jugin (Persian: جوگين, also Romanized as Jūgīn and Jowgīn; also known as Jūgan and Jowgan) is a village in Kahir Rural District, in the Central District of Konarak County, Sistan and Baluchestan Province, Iran. At the 2006 census, its population was 29, in 6 families.
