= Khalijabad =

Khalijabad خليج آباد
- Village
- Interactive map of Khalijabad
- Country: Iran
- Province: Sistan and Baluchestan
- County: Konarak
- Bakhsh: Central
- Rural District: Jahliyan

Population (2006)
  - Total: 147
- Time zone: UTC+3:30 (IRST)
  - Summer (DST): UTC+4:30 (IRDT)

Khalijabad (Persian: خليج آباد, also Romanized as Khalījābād) is a village in Jahliyan Rural District, in the Central District of Konarak County, Sistan and Baluchestan Province, Iran. At the 2006 census, its population was 147, in 34 families.
