= Chegerdanlash =

Chegerdanlash چگردان لاش
- Village
- Location within Iran
- Coordinates: 25°29′00″N 60°00′00″E
- Country: Iran
- Province: Sistan and Baluchestan
- County: Konarak
- Bakhsh: Central
- Rural District: Kahir

Population (2006)
  - Total: 463
- Time zone: UTC+3:30 (IRST)
  - Summer (DST): UTC+4:30 (IRDT)

Chegerdanlash (Persian: چگردان لاش, also Romanized as Chegerdānlāsh) is a village in Kahir Rural District, in the Central District of Konarak County, Sistan and Baluchestan province, Iran. At the 2006 census, its population was 463, in 96 families.
