= Seyyed Mohammad Bazar =

Seyyed Mohammad Bazar سيدمحمدبازار
- Village
- Location within Iran
- Coordinates: 25°34′07″N 60°07′51″E
- Country: Iran
- Province: Sistan and Baluchestan
- County: Konarak
- Bakhsh: Central
- Rural District: Kahir

Population (2006)
  - Total: 305
- Time zone: UTC+3:30 (IRST)
  - Summer (DST): UTC+4:30 (IRDT)

Seyyed Mohammad Bazar (Persian: سيدمحمدبازار, also Romanized as Seyyed Moḩammad Bāzār; also known as Seyyed Moḩammadābād) is a village in Kahir Rural District, in the Central District of Konarak County, Sistan and Baluchestan Province, Iran. At the 2006 census, its population was 305, in 59 families.
