= Deji, Konarak =

Irelivent دجي
- Village
- Location within Iran
- Coordinates: 25°35′52″N 60°08′41″E
- Country: Iran
- Province: Sistan and Baluchestan
- County: Konarak
- Bakhsh: Central
- Rural District: Kahir

Population (2006)
  - Total: 61
- Time zone: UTC+3:30 (IRST)
  - Summer (DST): UTC+4:30 (IRDT)

Deji (Persian: دجي, also Romanized as Dejī) is a village in Kahir Rural District, in the Central District of Konarak County, Sistan and Baluchestan Province, Iran. At the 2006 census, its population was 61, in 14 families.
