= Shahdad-e Kahir =

Shahdad-e Kahir شهداد کهیر
- Village
- Location within Iran
- Coordinates: 25°32′46″N 60°03′52″E
- Country: Iran
- Province: Sistan and Baluchestan
- County: Konarak
- Bakhsh: Central
- Rural District: Kahir

Population (2006)
  - Total: 560
- Time zone: UTC+3:30 (IRST)
  - Summer (DST): UTC+4:30 (IRDT)

Shahdad-e Kahir (Persian: شهداد کهیر, also Romanized as Shahdād-e Kahīr; also known as Kahīr and Kahīr Shahdād) is a village in Kahir Rural District, in the Central District of Konarak County, Sistan and Baluchestan, Iran. At the 2006 census, its population was 560, in 115 families.
