= Bansont =

Village in Sistan and Baluchestan province, Iran

Bansont Persian: بانسنت
- Village
- Location within Iran
- Coordinates: 25°31′25″N 60°17′48″E
- Country: Iran
- Province: Sistan and Baluchestan
- County: Konarak
- District: Central
- Rural District: Bansont

Population (2016)
  - Total: 1,824
- Time zone: UTC+3:30 (IRST)

Bansont (Persian: بانسنت) (Note: Also romanized as Bānsont and Bānesont; also known as Bāksūnat and Bānsunt) is a village in, and the capital of, Bansont Rural District of the Central District of Konarak County, Sistan and Baluchestan province, Iran.

== Demographics ==
=== Population ===
At the time of the 2006 National Census, the village's population was 1,475 in 273 households, when it was in Jahliyan Rural District. The following census in 2011 counted 1,838 people in 376 households. The 2016 census measured the population of the village as 1,824 people in 417 households.

After the census, Bansont was transferred to Bansont Rural District created in the district.
