= Tarampuk =

Tarampuk ترامپوك
- Village
- Location within Iran
- Coordinates: 25°33′48″N 59°46′04″E
- Country: Iran
- Province: Sistan and Baluchestan
- County: Konarak
- Bakhsh: Central
- Rural District: Kahir

Population (2006)
  - Total: 24
- Time zone: UTC+3:30 (IRST)
  - Summer (DST): UTC+4:30 (IRDT)

Tarampuk (Persian: ترامپوك, also Romanized as Tarāmpūk) is a village in Kahir Rural District, in the Central District of Konarak County, Sistan and Baluchestan Province, Iran. At the 2006 census, its population was 24, in 9 families.
