= Rigedan =

Rigedan ريگ دان
- Village
- Location within Iran
- Coordinates: 25°28′43″N 60°24′44″E
- Country: Iran
- Province: Sistan and Baluchestan
- County: Konarak
- Bakhsh: Central
- Rural District: Jahliyan

Population (2006)
  - Total: 31
- Time zone: UTC+3:30 (IRST)
  - Summer (DST): UTC+4:30 (IRDT)

Rigedan (Persian: ريگ دان, also Romanized as Rīgedān; also known as Regedān) is a village in Jahliyan Rural District, in the Central District of Konarak County, Sistan and Baluchestan Province, Iran. At the 2006 census, its population was 31, in 6 families.
