= Guriyat =

Guriyat گورئ يات
- Village
- Interactive map of Guriyat
- Country: Iran
- Province: Sistan and Baluchestan
- County: Konarak
- Bakhsh: Central
- Rural District: Jahliyan

Population (2006)
  - Total: 26
- Time zone: UTC+3:30 (IRST)
  - Summer (DST): UTC+4:30 (IRDT)

Guriyat (Persian: گورئ يات, also Romanized as Gūr’īyāt) is a village in Jahliyan Rural District, in the Central District of Konarak County, Sistan and Baluchestan Province, Iran. At the 2006 census, its population was 26, in 6 families.
