= Kahir =

Village in Sistan and Baluchestan province, Iran

Kahir Persian: کهير
- Village
- Location within Iran
- Coordinates: 25°35′17″N 60°07′31″E
- Country: Iran
- Province: Sistan and Baluchestan
- County: Konarak
- District: Kahir
- Rural District: Kahir

Population (2016)
  - Total: 2,213
- Time zone: UTC+3:30 (IRST)

Kahir (Persian: کهير) (Note: Also romanized as Kahīr) is a village in, and the former capital of, Kahir Rural District of Kahir District, Konarak County, Sistan and Baluchestan province, Iran, serving as capital of the district. The capital of the rural district has been transferred to the village of Bursar Heydari.

== Demographics ==
=== Population ===
At the time of the 2006 National Census, the village's population was 1,686 in 355 households, when it was in the Central District. The following census in 2011 counted 1,510 people in 343 households. The 2016 census measured the population of the village as 2,213 people in 451 households. It was the most populous village in its rural district.

After the census, the rural district was separated from the district in the formation of Kahir District.
