= Bir-e Rasul Bakhsh =

Bir-e Rasul Bakhsh بيررسول بخش
- Village
- Location within Iran
- Coordinates: 25°28′12″N 59°46′20″E
- Country: Iran
- Province: Sistan and Baluchestan
- County: Konarak
- Bakhsh: Central
- Rural District: Kahir

Population (2006)
  - Total: 279
- Time zone: UTC+3:30 (IRST)
  - Summer (DST): UTC+4:30 (IRDT)

Bir-e Rasul Bakhsh (Persian: بيررسول بخش, also Romanized as Bīr-e Rasūl Bakhsh; also known as Bīr) is a village in Kahir Rural District, in the Central District of Konarak County, Sistan and Baluchestan Province, Iran. At the 2006 census, its population was 279, in 63 families.
