= Tang Rural District =

Rural district in Sistan and Baluchestan province, Iran

Tang Rural District Persian: دهستان تنگ
- Rural District
- Location within Iran
- Coordinates: 25°33′19″N 59°49′26″E
- Country: Iran
- Province: Sistan and Baluchestan
- County: Konarak
- District: Kahir
- Capital: Bandar-e Tang
- Time zone: UTC+3:30 (IRST)

Tang Rural District (Persian: دهستان تنگ) is in Kahir District of Konarak County, Sistan and Baluchestan province, Iran. Its capital is the village of Bandar-e Tang, whose population at the time of the 2016 National Census was 1,504 people in 343 households.

== History ==
After the 2016 census, Kahir Rural District was separated from the Central District in the formation of Kahir District, and Tang Rural District was created in the new district.
