= Hamidabad, Sistan and Baluchestan =

Village in Sistan and Baluchestan province, Iran

Hamidabad Persian: حميداباد
- Village
- Location within Iran
- Coordinates: 25°31′57″N 60°26′00″E
- Country: Iran
- Province: Sistan and Baluchestan
- County: Konarak
- District: Central
- Rural District: Jahliyan

Population (2016)
  - Total: 1,126
- Time zone: UTC+3:30 (IRST)

Hamidabad (Persian: حميداباد) (Note: Formerly Hamidgu (حميدگو), also romanized as Ḩamīdgū) is a village in Jahliyan Rural District of the Central District of Konarak County, Sistan and Baluchestan province, Iran.

== Demographics ==
=== Population ===
At the time of the 2006 National Census, the village's population was 840 in 155 households. The following census in 2011 counted 1,010 people in 230 households. The 2016 census measured the population of the village as 1,126 people in 264 households.
