= Goden =

Goden may refer to:

- Kevin Goden (born 1999), German footballer
- Goden (Gjakova), Kosovo, a hamlet
- Gōden, a Japanese school of military strategy - see Ijichi Masaharu

== See also ==
- Lordship of Gödens, a lordship in the County of East Frisia from 1495 to 1807
- Godan (disambiguation)
- Godon, a surname
