= Jahliyan =

Village in Sistan and Baluchestan province, Iran

Jahliyan Persian: جهليان
- Village
- Location within Iran
- Coordinates: 25°28′32″N 60°21′41″E
- Country: Iran
- Province: Sistan and Baluchestan
- County: Konarak
- District: Central
- Rural District: Jahliyan

Population (2016)
  - Total: 553
- Time zone: UTC+3:30 (IRST)

Jahliyan (Persian: جهليان) (Note: Also romanized as Jahleyān, Jahlīān, and Jahlīyān; also known as Jahlīār) is a village in, and the capital of, Jahliyan Rural District of the Central District of Konarak County, Sistan and Baluchestan province, Iran.

== Demographics ==
=== Population ===
At the time of the 2006 National Census, the village's population was 470 in 96 households. The following census in 2011 counted 545 people in 125 households. The 2016 census measured the population of the village as 553 people in 132 households.
