= Birdaf =

Birdaf بيردف
- Village
- Location within Iran
- Coordinates: 25°25′08″N 59°48′38″E
- Country: Iran
- Province: Sistan and Baluchestan
- County: Konarak
- Bakhsh: Central
- Rural District: Kahir

Population (2006)
  - Total: 193
- Time zone: UTC+3:30 (IRST)
  - Summer (DST): UTC+4:30 (IRDT)

Birdaf (Persian: بيردف, also Romanized as Bīrdaf; also known as Bīr) is a village in Kahir Rural District, in the Central District of Konarak County, Sistan and Baluchestan Province, Iran. At the 2006 census, its population was 193, in 42 families.
