= Bir-e Bala =

Bir-e Bala بير بالا
- Village
- Location within Iran
- Coordinates: 25°32′41″N 59°47′21″E
- Country: Iran
- Province: Sistan and Baluchestan
- County: Konarak
- Bakhsh: Central
- Rural District: Kahir

Population (2006)
  - Total: 181
- Time zone: UTC+3:30 (IRST)
  - Summer (DST): UTC+4:30 (IRDT)

Bir-e Bala (Persian: بير بالا, also Romanized as Bīr-e Bālā; also known as Bālād) is a village in Kahir Rural District, in the Central District of Konarak County, Sistan and Baluchestan Province, Iran. At the 2006 census, its population was 181, in 47 families.
