= Muman-e Bala =

Muman-e Bala مومان بالا
- Village
- Location within Iran
- Coordinates: 25°36′10″N 60°28′47″E
- Country: Iran
- Province: Sistan and Baluchestan
- County: Konarak
- Bakhsh: Central
- Rural District: Jahliyan

Population (2006)
  - Total: 190
- Time zone: UTC+3:30 (IRST)
  - Summer (DST): UTC+4:30 (IRDT)

Muman-e Bala (Persian: مومان بالا, also Romanized as Mūmān-e Bālā; also known as Moman, Momān Post, and Mūmān) is a village in Jahliyan Rural District, in the Central District of Konarak County, Sistan and Baluchestan Province, Iran. At the 2006 census, its population was 190, in 41 families.
