= Muman-e Vasat =

Muman-e Vasat مومان وسطي
- Village
- Location within Iran
- Coordinates: 25°34′12″N 60°28′47″E
- Country: Iran
- Province: Sistan and Baluchestan
- County: Konarak
- Bakhsh: Central
- Rural District: Jahliyan

Population (2006)
  - Total: 443
- Time zone: UTC+3:30 (IRST)
  - Summer (DST): UTC+4:30 (IRDT)

Muman-e Vasat (Persian: مومان وسطي, also Romanized as Mūmān-e Vosţá; also known as Mūmān-e Bālā and Mūmān-e Vasaţ) is a village in Jahliyan Rural District, in the Central District of Konarak County, Sistan and Baluchestan Province, Iran. At the 2006 census, its population was 443, in 92 families.
