= Muman-e Pain =

Muman-e Pain مومان پايين
- Village
- Location within Iran
- Coordinates: 25°33′57″N 60°28′45″E
- Country: Iran
- Province: Sistan and Baluchestan
- County: Konarak
- Bakhsh: Central
- Rural District: Jahliyan

Population (2006)
  - Total: 172
- Time zone: UTC+3:30 (IRST)
  - Summer (DST): UTC+4:30 (IRDT)

Muman-e Pain (Persian: مومان پايين, also Romanized as Mūmān-e Pā’īn) is a village in Jahliyan Rural District, in the Central District of Konarak County, Sistan and Baluchestan Province, Iran. At the 2006 census, its population was 172, in 40 families.
