= Mashan =

Mashan may refer to:

== China ==
- Mashan County (马山县), Guangxi
- Mashan District (麻山区), Jixi, Heilongjiang

Subdistricts (马山街道)

- Mashan Subdistrict, Wuxi, in Binhu District, Wuxi, Jiangsu
- Mashan Subdistrict, Chaoyang, Liaoning, in Longcheng District
- Mashan Subdistrict, Yantai, in Laishan District, Yantai, Shandong

Towns

- Mashan, Jiangxi (麻山镇), in Xiangdong District, Pingxiang

Written as "马山镇":

- Mashan, Meitan County, Guizhou
- Mashan, Hubei, in Jingzhou District, Jingzhou
- Mashan, Shandong, in Changqing District, Jinan
- Mashan, Zhejiang, in Yuecheng District, Shaoxing

Townships

- Mashan Township, Heng County (马山乡), Guangxi
- Mashan Township, Liucheng County (马山乡), Guangxi
- Mashan Township, Guizhou (麻山乡), in Wangmo County

== Iran ==
- Mashan, Iran, a village in Sistan and Baluchestan Province, Iran

== South Korea ==
- Masan (馬山市), former municipality in South Gyeongsang Province, South Korea, merged in July 2010 with Changwon and Jinhae into Changwon City

== Taiwan ==
- Mashan Broadcasting and Observation Station, Jinsha (Kinsha), Kinmen (Qumeoy), Taiwan (ROC)

== Other ==
- Mashan Miao, the dialect of the Miao language spoken around Mashan Township, Guizhou
