= Bir-e Sofla =

Bir-e Sofla بير سفلي
- Village
- Location within Iran
- Coordinates: 25°29′02″N 59°47′54″E
- Country: Iran
- Province: Sistan and Baluchestan
- County: Konarak
- Bakhsh: Central
- Rural District: Kahir

Population (2006)
  - Total: 430
- Time zone: UTC+3:30 (IRST)
  - Summer (DST): UTC+4:30 (IRDT)

Bir-e Sofla (Persian: بير سفلي, also Romanized as Bīr-e Soflá; also known as Karag) is a village in Kahir Rural District, in the Central District of Konarak County, Sistan and Baluchestan Province, Iran. At the 2006 census, its population was 430, in 98 families.
