= Pozm =

Pozm or Pazm (Persian: پزم), also known as Puzm or Puzim, may refer to:

- Pozm-e Machchan
- Pozm-e Tiab
