= BRS =

BRS, Brs, or, BrS, may refer to:

== Places ==
- Beijing Royal School, China
- Berrylands railway station (National Rail station code BRS), London
- Bristol Airport (IATA airport code BRS), England

== Groups, companies, organizations ==
- Ballistic Recovery Systems, a manufacturer of aircraft ballistic parachutes
- Beatrice Rafferty School, now Sipayik Elementary School
- Bharat Rashtra Samithi, a political party in India
- Blood Red Shoes, an English punk duo
- Blue Ribbon Sports, a US sportswear company, former name of Nike, Inc.
- Bonn-Rhein-Sieg University of Applied Sciences (BRS), a German university
- Boston Red Sox, an American baseball team
- British Road Services, transport company
- Brotherhood of Railroad Signalmen, a US labor union
- Bruckmann, Rosser, Sherrill & Co., a US private equity firm
- Bulgarian Register of Shipping
- BRS (Indonesian: bantu rumah sakit, lit. 'hospital ship'), Indonesian hospital ships
- BRS Resources, a US petroleum exploration company

== Other uses ==
- BRS/Search, full text search engine
- BRS-inequality (Bruss-Robertson-Steele inequality)
- BRS carriage, a type of Australian passenger rail carriage
- Brugada syndrome (BrS), a genetic condition
- Brassia (Brs.), a genus of orchids
- Bus rapid service (BRS), otherwise known as bus rapid transit (BRT)
- Kaili language (ISO 639 language code brs)

== See also ==
- Ben Roberts-Smith, an Australian former soldier
- BR (disambiguation)
