= 4th Marine Brigade (Iran) =

- تیپ چهارم تفنگداران دریایی
- Country: Iran
- Allegiance: Supreme Leader of Iran
- Branch: Navy
- Type: Marines
- Role: Air assault Amphibious warfare Anti-tank warfare Armoured reconnaissance Artillery observer Bomb disposal Border security Clandestine operation Close-quarters battle Coastal raiding Combined arms Counter-battery fire Counterinsurgency; Desert warfare Force protection Indirect fire Maneuver warfare Military logistics Naval boarding Patrolling; Raiding; Reconnaissance; Screening; Special operations Special reconnaissance Tracking; Urban warfare
- Size: Brigade
- Part of: Islamic Republic of Iran Navy Marine Command
- Garrison/HQ: Anzali, Gilan province

Commanders
- Current commander: Captain Afshin Rezaei Haddad

4th Marine Imam Reza Brigade (Persian: تیپ چهارم تفنگداران دریایی امام رضا) is a marines special operations capable forces brigade with armoured cavalry capabilities of Islamic Republic of Iran Navy Marine Command based in Anzali, Gilan province.

The 4th Marine Imam Reza Brigade responsible for air assault to operations in the event of an emergency requiring military force as a rapid reaction force (RRF) in the areas of responsibility, amphibious warfare, clandestine operation, combined arms, coastal raiding, counterinsurgency, desert warfare, maneuver warfare, military logistics management for prepare amphibious warfare operations, naval boarding, providing security at naval bases or shore stations, reconnaissance in the areas of responsibility, special operations for amphibious warfare, support border security, support coastal defence, and urban warfare.
