= Brrr =

Brrr or BRRR may refer to:

- Onomatopoeia for shivering
- Br-r-r-!, 1959 anthology of horror stories
- BRRR (real estate), "buy, rehab, rent, and refinance", a real estate investing strategy
- Brrr (song), a 2023 song by Kim Petras
- Brrr – the Cowardly Lion, a character in the 1995 novel Wicked by Gregory Maguire
- BR-RR, the ISO-3166 code of the Brazilian state of Roraima

== See also ==
- BRR (disambiguation)
- BR (disambiguation)
- Birr (disambiguation)
- Bir (disambiguation)
