= BR =

BR, Br or br may refer to:

== Arts, media, and entertainment ==
- Bad Religion, a Californian punk rock band
- Battle Royale (disambiguation)
  - Battle Royale (novel), a Japanese novel completed in 1999 written by Koushun Takami
  - Battle Royale (film), a 2000 film based on the novel with the same name
  - Battle royale, a video game genre, itself based on the film with the same name
- Bayerischer Rundfunk (Bavarian Broadcasting), a regional broadcasting service in Germany
- Black Rider (TV series), a 2023 Filipino action TV series
- Blade Runner (franchise)
  - Blade Runner, a 1982 film by Ridley Scott
  - Blade Runner 2049, its 2017 sequel, directed by Denis Villeneuve
- Bleacher Report (B/R), an online sports media network
- Bohemian Rhapsody, which refers to two things:
  - the 1975 single, a song from Queen's 1975 album A Night at the Opera,
  - or the film of the same name, released in 2018
- Business Recorder, a Pakistani financial newspaper

== Government, military, and politics ==
- Bambatha Rifles, an infantry regiment of the South African Army
- Red Brigades (Italian: Brigate Rosse), an Italian militant leftist group

== Mathematics, science, and technology ==
=== Computing ===
- Adobe Bridge, an Adobe software
- Basic rate mode, in Bluetooth
- Brotli, a data format specification
- Bus request, a control bus signal
- <br />, the line break tag in HTML
- .br, Brazil's ccTLD top-level Internet domain name

=== Chemistry ===
- Bilirubin, a bile pigment that is a degradation product of heme
- Bromine, symbol Br, a chemical element
- Polybutadiene, a type of rubber

=== Botany ===
- BR, the abbreviation assigned to the herbarium of Meise Botanic Garden as a repository of specimens
- Br. (more commonly R.Br.), the botanical authority for Robert Brown (botanist, born 1773)

== Places ==
- Barbados, WMO country code
- Baton Rouge, Louisiana
- Bihar, a state in eastern India (vehicle registration and ISO 3166-2 subdivision code BR)
- Bison Range, Montana
- BR postcode area, a group of eight postal districts in southeast London
- Brăila, Romania (vehicle plate code BR)
- Brazil (ISO 3166-1 alpha-2 and FIPS 104 code BR)
- British (disambiguation) (ISO 4 abbreviation Br.)
- Brown County, Kansas (Kansas state county code BR, used on the state's license plates)
- Province of Brindisi (ISO 3166-2 subdivision code BR)

== Transportation ==
- B&R or B+R, bike and ride, bicycle parking next to transit

=== Aeroplanes ===
- British Caledonian, a defunct British airline whose IATA code was BR
- EVA Air (IATA code BR), a Taiwanese international airline
- Breguet Aviation, French: Société anonyme des ateliers d'aviation Louis Breguet, a French aircraft manufacturer, founded 1911, merged with Dassault in 1971p

=== Trains ===
- Barrie line (BR), of the GO Transit rail network in Ontario, Canada
- Bangladesh Railway, a government owned rail transport authority
- Barry Railway, former railway in Wales
- Botswana Railways, the national railway of Botswana
- British Rail, the main state-owned railway operator in Great Britain from 1948 until it was privatised from 1994 to 1997
- Burma Railways, former railway in Myanmar
- Wenhu line (Chinese: 文湖線) or Brown line, of the Taipei Metro

== Other uses ==
- Breton language (ISO 639-1 language code br)
- Brother (Christian), abbreviated form of address
- Banana Republic, American clothing store
- Baskin-Robbins, chain of ice cream shops
- Bedroom, in real estate listings

== See also ==
- BRR (disambiguation)
- Brrr (disambiguation)
- BRS (disambiguation)
- Roxibolone (development code BR-906), a steroidal antiglucocorticoid
- Rolls-Royce BR700, a turbofan aircraft engine
- BR549, an American country rock band
- Honda BR-V, an SUV
