= BRR =

BRR or Brr may refer to:

- Balanced repeated replication, a statistical technique for estimating sampling variability
- Barra Airport (Scotland) (IATA airport code)
- Barrhead railway station, a Scottish railway station
- Bedroom Rat Records, UK garage record label
- Binary Revolution Radio, a hacker internet radio show
- Bit-rate reduction, another term for data compression
- Bit Rate Reduction, a name given to an audio compression scheme used in the SNES
- Blenheim Riverside Railway, a narrow gauge railway in Blenheim, New Zealand
- BMW Rolls-Royce AeroEngines GmbH, in short form BMW Rolls-Royce, a former joint venture company of BMW AG and Rolls-Royce plc
- Book Rights Registry, disburses revenue from Google Book Search
- Brazilian cruzeiro real, the short-lived currency between August 1993 and June 1994, that had ISO 4217 code BRR
- BRR dances
- Business Readiness Rating
- Badan Rehabilitasi dan Rekonstruksi or BRR NAD-Nias, an Agency for Rehabilitation and Reconstruction of Aceh and Nias
- Black Rose Rollers, a roller derby league from Hanover, Pennsylvania

== See also ==
- Brrr (disambiguation)
- Bir (disambiguation)
