= Pozm-e Machchan =

Pozm-e Machchan پزم مچان
- Village
- Location within Iran
- Coordinates: 25°21′32″N 60°20′47″E
- Country: Iran
- Province: Sistan and Baluchestan
- County: Konarak
- Bakhsh: Central
- Rural District: Jahliyan

Population (2006)
  - Total: 642
- Time zone: UTC+3:30 (IRST)
  - Summer (DST): UTC+4:30 (IRDT)

Pozm-e Machchan (Persian: پزم مچان, also Romanized as Pozm-e Machchān; also known as Māchān, Māchā Pozm, Māshān, and Pozm Machā) is a village in Jahliyan Rural District, in the Central District of Konarak County, Sistan and Baluchestan Province, Iran. At the 2006 census, its population was 642, in 82 families.
