= 3rd Marine Brigade (Iran) =

- تیپ سوم تفنگداران دریایی
- Country: Iran
- Allegiance: Supreme Leader of Iran
- Branch: Navy
- Type: Marines
- Role: Air assault Amphibious warfare Anti-tank warfare Armoured reconnaissance Artillery observer Bomb disposal Border security Clandestine operation Close-quarters battle Coastal raiding Combined arms Counter-battery fire Counterinsurgency; Desert warfare Force protection Indirect fire Maneuver warfare Military logistics Naval boarding Patrolling; Raiding; Reconnaissance; Screening; Special operations Special reconnaissance Tracking; Urban warfare
- Size: Brigade
- Part of: Islamic Republic of Iran Navy Marine Command
- Garrison/HQ: Konarak, Sistan and Baluchestan province

Commanders
- Notable commanders: Commander Seyyed Hossein Molayi †

3rd Marine Hamza Sayyid-ush-Shuhda Brigade (Persian: تیپ سوم تفنگداران دریایی حمزه سیدالشهداء) is a marines special operations capable forces brigade with armoured cavalry capabilities of Islamic Republic of Iran Navy Marine Command based in Konarak, Sistan and Baluchestan province. The unit operates in Gulf of Oman.

The 3rd Marine Hamza Sayyid-ush-Shuhda Brigade responsible for air assault to operations in the event of an emergency requiring military force as a rapid reaction force (RRF) in Gulf of Oman areas, amphibious warfare, clandestine operation, combined arms, coastal raiding, counterinsurgency, desert warfare, maneuver warfare, military logistics management for prepare amphibious warfare operations, naval boarding, providing security at naval bases or shore stations, reconnaissance in the areas of responsibility, special operations for amphibious warfare, support border security, support coastal defence, and urban warfare.

== Establishment ==
3rd Marine brigade of Iranian Navy was established by Commander Seyyed Hossein Molayi. Commander Molayi was killed in action when he was locating the practice field for the newly established Brigade in South East of Iran on September 12, 2011. He was trapped within an ambush and killed by the mobs.
