= Shahr-e Jadid-e Tis =

City in Sistan and Baluchestan province, Iran

Shahr-e Jadid-e Tis Persian: شهر جدید تیس
- City
- Location within Iran
- Coordinates: 25°27′19″N 60°29′17″E
- Country: Iran
- Province: Sistan and Baluchestan
- County: Konarak
- District: Central
- Time zone: UTC+3:30 (IRST)

Shahr-e Jadid-e Tis (Persian: شهر جدید تیس) is a new city in the Central District of Konarak County, Sistan and Baluchestan province, Iran.

== Overview ==
Mohsen Nariman, the Deputy Minister of Roads and Urban Development, said that Islamic and Iranian perspectives are taken into account in the design and architecture of the new city of Tis in Konarak County. It is in the south of Sistan and Baluchestan province, and plays a role in balancing the cities of Chabahar and Konarak. He also said that in the beginning of the establishment of Shahr-e Jadid-e Tis, investment must be made in the first years. Other new cities will be activated as partners and collaborators to enable capacity in this new city.

Mohsen Nariman said that the city will be created with an area of 4,300 hectares (43 km^{2}) and a residential approach to the design. The governor of the province said the city had been approved first by the Planning and Development Council of the province and then by the Supreme Council of Architecture and Urban Planning of the country. Ali Avtaz Hashemi said that, in building this city and relying on creativity, it should be turned into a population center unique in the region.
