= Pozm-e Tiab =

Village in Sistan and Baluchestan province, Iran

Pozm-e Tiab Persian: پزم تياب
- Village
- Location within Iran
- Coordinates: 25°21′29″N 60°18′59″E
- Country: Iran
- Province: Sistan and Baluchestan
- County: Konarak
- District: Central
- Rural District: Jahliyan

Population (2016)
  - Total: 2,912
- Time zone: UTC+3:30 (IRST)

Pozm-e Tiab (Persian: پزم تياب) (Note: Also romanized as Pazm Tīāb, Pazm Tīyāb, Pozm Teyāb, Pozm-e Teyāb, and Pozm-e Tīāb; also known as Pazm, Pozm, Pūzīm, and Pūzm) is a village in Jahliyan Rural District of the Central District of Konarak County, Sistan and Baluchestan province, Iran.

== Demographics ==
=== Population ===
At the time of the 2006 National Census, the village's population was 2,040 in 402 households. The following census in 2011 counted 2,385 people in 479 households. The 2016 census measured the population of the village as 2,912 people in 642 households. It was the most populous village in its rural district.
