= 2nd Marine Brigade =

2nd Marine Brigade may refer to:

- 2nd Marine Brigade (Iran)
- 2nd Marine Brigade (People's Republic of China)
- 2nd Marine Division (South Korea) which operated as the 2nd Marine Brigade in the Vietnam War
- 2nd Marine Expeditionary Brigade, United States

== See also ==
- 2nd Brigade (disambiguation)
