= Islamic Republic of Iran Navy Marine Command =

Naval infantry component of the Islamic Republic of Iran Navy

The Marine Command (Persian: فرماندهی تفنگداران دریایی) is the marine corps element of the Islamic Republic of Iran Navy (IRIN).

== Personnel ==
During the Iran–Iraq War, Iranian marines were divided in three battalions (approximately 1,500 troops): one stationed at Khorramshahr and the other two at Bandar Abbas, one of which detached to Kharg Island. According to the 2020 edition of the Military Balance published by IISS, the size of the marines is about 2,600. An unclassified report published by the American Office of Naval Intelligence (ONI) in 2017, concludes that "[t]he IRIN touts its infantry marines training program as being very selective, accepting only the most qualified individuals".

== Units ==
| Unit | Patron | Headquarters |
|---|---|---|
| 1st Marine Brigade | Imam Hossein | Bandar Abbas, Hormozgan |
| 2nd Marine Brigade | Hazrat Rasul Akram | Jask, Hormozgan |
| 3rd Marine Brigade | Hamza Sayyid ash-Shuhadāʾ | Konarak, Sistan and Baluchestan |
| 4th Marine Brigade | Imam Reza | Anzali, Gilan |

== See also ==
- Sepah Navy Special Force, naval infantry of the IRGC
