= Bansont Rural District =

Rural district in Sistan and Baluchestan province, Iran

Bansont Rural District Persian: دهستان بانسنت
- Rural District
- Location within Iran
- Coordinates: 25°37′26″N 60°28′33″E
- Country: Iran
- Province: Sistan and Baluchestan
- County: Konarak
- District: Central
- Capital: Bansont
- Time zone: UTC+3:30 (IRST)

Bansont Rural District (Persian: دهستان بانسنت) is in the Central District of Konarak County, Sistan and Baluchestan province, Iran. Its capital is the village of Bansont, whose population at the time of the 2016 National Census was 1,824 people in 417 households.

== History ==
Bansont Rural District was created in the Central District after the 2016 census.
