= Yantai Laishan Airport =

Military airport in Yantai, Shandong, China

- IATA: none; ICAO: none

Summary
- Airport type: Military
- Serves: Yantai
- Location: Laishan, Yantai, Shandong, China
- Opened: 8 October 1984
- Passenger services ceased: 28 May 2015
- Elevation AMSL: 18 m / 59 ft
- Coordinates: 37°24′6″N 121°22′18″E

Map
- Location of airport in Shandong

Runways
Direction	Length		Surface
Direction	m	ft	Surface
04/22	3,200	10,499	Concrete

Yantai Laishan Airport
- Simplified Chinese: 烟台莱山机场
- Traditional Chinese: 煙台萊山機場
Transcriptions
Standard Mandarin
- Hanyu Pinyin: Yāntái Láishān Jīchǎng

Yantai Laishan Airport is a military airport in Yantai in Shandong, China. It formerly also served as the civil airport of Yantai, until it was replaced by Yantai Penglai International Airport which was opened on 28 May 2015. It is about 15 kilometers (9.3 mi) from the city center and covers an area over 45.79 acres (185,300 m^{2}).

Laishan Airport was originally a military airport operated by the People's Liberation Army Navy. In June 1984, the Chinese government and Central Military Commission agreed to open the airport to civil flights, which began operation in October 1984 with flights to Beijing and Shanghai. On 24 October 1986, PLAAF pilot Zheng Caitian flew his Shenyang J-6 from Laishan airport to Seoul Air Base and when he reached Taiwan. During the 31 years of its commercial operation, traffic grew significantly, and the airport served flights between Yantai and more than 70 Chinese cities, as well as several international destinations including Seoul and Busan in South Korea. As the existing facilities could not meet the growing demands of the city, the Yantai government began construction of Penglai International Airport in September 2011. In 2014, its last full year as a civil airport, Laishan served more than four million passengers.

== See also ==
- List of airports in China
- List of the busiest airports in China
- List of People's Liberation Army Air Force airbases
