= Business Readiness Rating =

Business Readiness Rating (Open BRR) is one of several rating systems for open source software. It is hoped that the system will address testing and reliability requirements important in the enterprise environment, sharing and reducing the perceived TCO of open source software. It considers the quality of the product (e.g., security), the quality of the community supporting that product, and some ISO 25010 characteristics (e.g., usability).

Sponsors included Carnegie Mellon Silicon Valley Center for Open Source Investigation, CodeZoo, SpikeSource, and Intel.

Similar rating systems include OpenSource Maturity Model (OSMM), Source Quality Observatory for Open Source Software (SQO-OSS), Evaluation Framework for Free/Open souRce projecTs (EFFORT), Qualification and Selection of Open Source software (QSOS) model, and Open Source Usability Maturity Model (OS-UMM).
