= Godon =

Godon may refer to:

- Alain Godon (born 1964), French painter and sculptor
- Ingrid Godon (born 1958), Flemish illustrator
- Kervin Godon (born 1982), Mauritian footballer
- Sylvanus William Godon (1809–1879), American admiral

== See also ==
- Godan (disambiguation)
- Goden (disambiguation)
