= Open-source software assessment methodologies =

Several methods have been created to define an assessment process for free/open-source software. Some focus on some aspects like the maturity, the durability and the strategy of the organisation around the open-source project itself. Other methodologies add functional aspects to the assessment process.

== Existing methodologies ==
There are more than 20 different OSS evaluation methods.

- Open Source Maturity Model (OSMM) from Capgemini
- Open Source Maturity Model (OSMM) from Navica
- Open Source Maturity Model (OSSMM) by Woods and Guliani
- Methodology of Qualification and Selection of Open Source software (QSOS)
- Open Business Readiness Rating (OpenBRR)
- Open Business Quality Rating (OpenBQR)
- QualiPSo
- QualiPSo Model for Open Source Software Trustworthiness (MOSST)
- Towards A Trustworthiness Model For Open Source Software: How to evaluate Open Source Software
- QualOSS – Quality of Open Source
- Evaluation Framework for Open Source Software
- A Quality Model for OSS Selection
- Atos Origin Method for Qualification and Selection of Open Source Software (QSOS)
- Observatory for Innovation and Technological transfer on Open Source software (OITOS)
- Framework for OS Critical Systems Evaluation (FOCSE)

== Comparison ==
=== Comparison criteria ===
Stol and Babar have proposed a comparison framework for OSS evaluation methods. Their framework lists criteria in four categories: criteria related to the context in which the method is to be used, the user of the method, the process of the method, and the evaluation of the method (e.g., its validity and maturity stage).

The comparison presented below is based on the following (alternative set of) criteria:

- Seniority : the methodology birth date.
- Original authors/sponsors : original methodology authors and sponsoring entity (if any)
- License : Distribution and usage license for the methodology and the resulting assessments
- Assessment model :
  - Detail levels : several levels of details or assessment granularity
  - Predefined criteria : the methodology provides some predefined criteria
  - Technical/functional criteria : the methodology permits the use of domain specific criteria based on technical information or features
- Scoring model :
  - Scoring scale by criterion
  - Iterative process : the assessment can be performed and refined using several steps improving the level of details
  - Criteria weighting : it is possible to apply weighting on the assessed criteria as part of the methodology scoring model
- Comparison : the comparison process is defined by the methodology

=== Comparison chart ===
Criteria	OSMM Capgemini	OSMM Navica	QSOS	OpenBRR	OpenBQR	OpenSource Maturity Model
Seniority	2003	2004	2004	2005	2007	2008
Original authors/sponsors	Capgemini	Navicasoft	Atos Origin	Carnegie Mellon Silicon Valley, SpikeSource, O'Reilly, Intel	University of Insubria	QualiPSo project, EU commission
License	Non-free license, but authorised distribution	Assessment models licensed under the Academic Free License	Methodology and assessments results licensed under the GNU Free Documentation License	Assessments results licensed under a Creative Commons license	Creative Commons Attribution-Share Alike 3.0 License	Creative Commons Attribution-Share Alike 3.0 License
Assessment model	Practical	Practical	Practical	Scientific	Practical	Scientific
Detail levels	2 axes on 2 levels	3 levels	3 levels or more (functional grids)	2 levels	3 levels	3 levels
Predefined criteria	Yes	Yes	Yes	Yes	Yes	Yes
Technical/functional criteria	No	No	Yes	Yes	Yes	Yes
Scoring model	Flexible	Flexible	Strict	Flexible	Flexible	Flexible
Scoring scale by criterion	1 to 5	1 to 10	0 to 2	1 to 5	1 to 5	1 to 4
Iterative process	No	No	Yes	Yes	Yes	Yes
Criteria weighting	Yes	Yes	Yes	Yes	Yes	Yes
Comparison	Yes	No	Yes	No	Yes	No

== See also ==
- Free software
- Open source
