= QSOS =

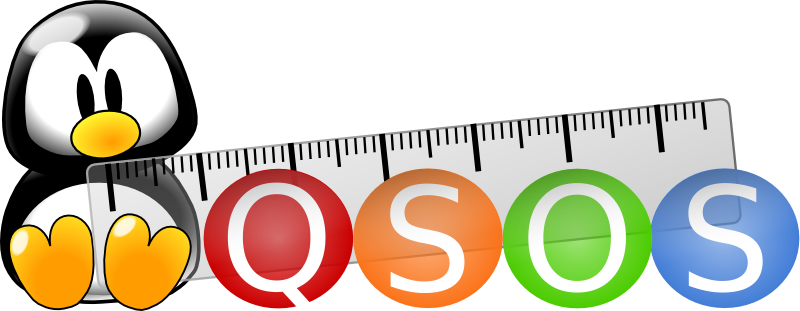
Logo QSOS

The Qualification and Selection of Open Source software (QSOS) is a methodology for assessing free and libre open-source software. This methodology is released under the GFDL license.

== General approach ==
QSOS defines 4 steps that are part of an iterative process:

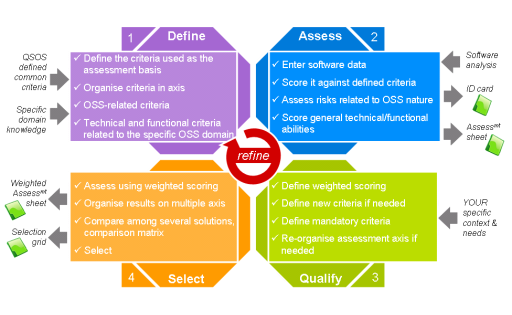
QSOS general process

- 1 - Define and organise what will be assessed (common Open Source criteria and risks and technical domain specific functionalities),
- 2 - Assess the competing software against the criteria defined above and score these criteria individually,
- 3 - Qualify your evaluation by organising criteria into evaluation axes, and defining filtering (weightings, etc.) related to your context,
- 4 - Select the appropriate OSS by scoring all competing software using the filtering system designed in step 3.

== Output documents ==
This process generates software assessing sheets as well as comparison grids. These comparison grids eventually assist the user to choose the right software depending on the context. These documents are also released under the free GNU FDL Licence. This allows them to be reused and improved, as well as to remain more objective. Assessment sheets are stored using an XML-based format.

== Tools ==
Several tools distributed under the GPL licence are provided to help users manipulate QSOS documents:

- Template editor: QSOS XUL Template Editor
- Assessment sheets editors:
  - QSOS XUL Editor
  - QSOS Qt Editor
  - QSOS Java Editor (under development)

== See also ==
- Open source software assessment methodologies
- Open Source Software
- Free Software
