= Bir Tungal =

Bir Tungal is a hill area situated approximately 10 km from the Mandi Town. Mandi is the central district of Himachal Pradesh, India.

It has a middle class population dependent on agriculture, government and other private jobs. There are about 5000 and 95% of them are educated people. Bir, Kathyana, Badgaon, Bhalyater etc. are the villages under it. "Kamrumahuanag" is one of the best known temples of Bir Tungal.
