= Godan =

Godan may refer to:

- Godán, a parish in northern Spain
- Godan, Iran, a village in Sistan and Baluchestan Province, Iran
- Godan Khan, the son of Ögedei Khan
- Godan verb, a Japanese verb type
- Global Open Data for Agriculture and Nutrition, a UK-based NGO
- the fifth-degree black belt; see Dan (rank) § Ranks in Japanese
- the Lombard name for Odin, a god of Germanic paganism

== See also ==
- Godaan, a Hindi novel by Munshi Premchand
