= Rosette Bir =

French sculptor (1926–1992)

Rosette Bir (1926–1992) was a French sculptor. She lived in Montreuil, a suburb of Paris, France.

Born in 1926, she started her work at 42, when she finished raising her children in a wealthy family.

She learned from the artist Albert Féraud. However, after she learned the techniques, she decided to go her own way by mostly working on geometrical sculptures. In a way, she followed the MADI art, from South America in the sculptural domain.

Her work is exclusively based on one material: polished stainless steel.

Her collection is only composed of unique, one of a kind, pieces.

She made sculptures of every size: from ash trays to a few meters high monumental sculpture, that were sometimes exposed in parks and large lobbies.

Her works traveled the country in expositions, museums, and public areas, like in Paris or Monaco.

Many articles were also published in magazines and newspapers about the artist herself and some of her art creations.

She died in 1992 in a car accident.
