= Laishan, Yantai =

Laishan District 莱山区
- District
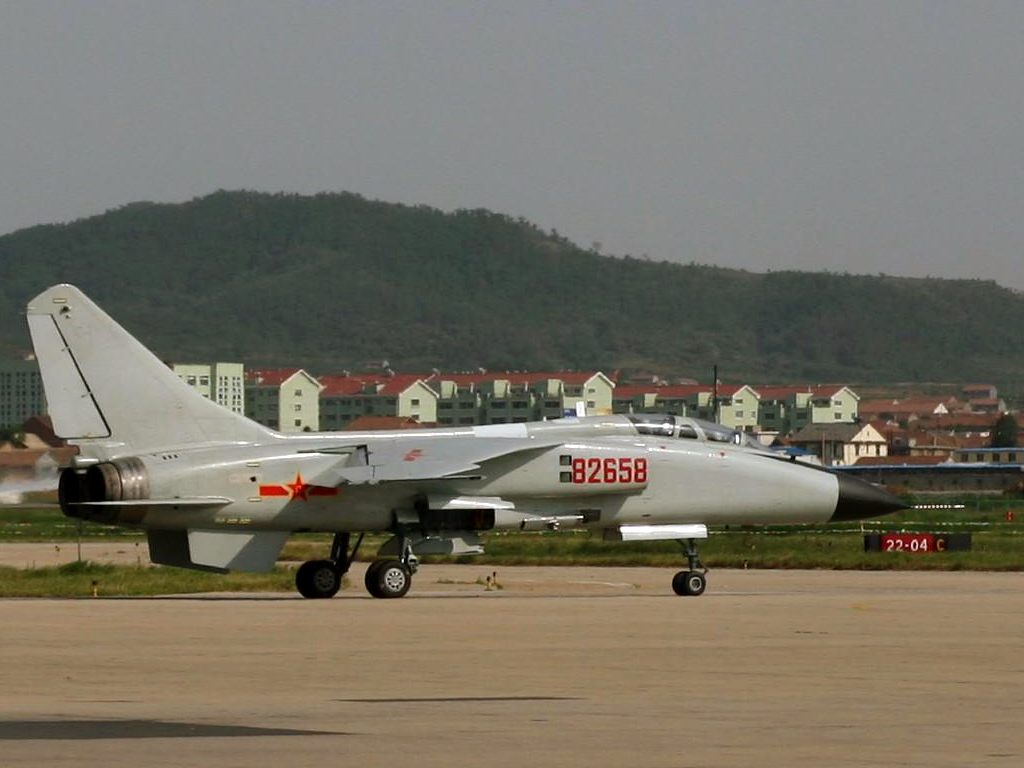
- JH-7A of the People's Liberation Army Air Force seen at Yantai Laishan International Airport

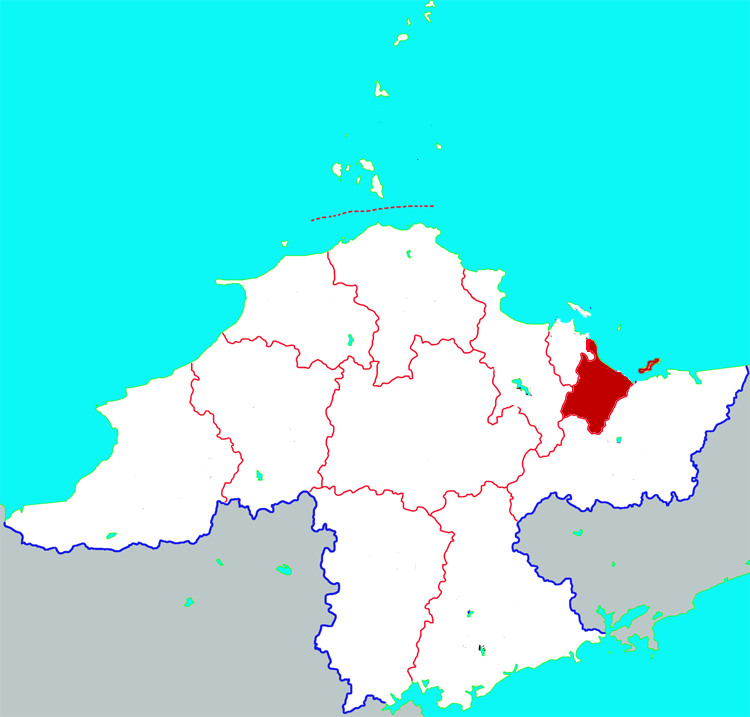
- Location in Yantai

- Location in Shandong
- Coordinates: 37°30′49″N 121°26′39″E
- Country: People's Republic of China
- Province: Shandong
- Prefecture-level city: Yantai

Area
  - Total: 258 km^{2} (100 sq mi)

Population (2017)
  - Total: 222,000
  - Density: 860/km^{2} (2,230/sq mi)
- Time zone: UTC+8 (China Standard)
- Postal code: 264003
- Website: www.ytlaishan.gov.cn

Laishan District (simplified Chinese: 莱山区; traditional Chinese: 萊山區; pinyin: Láishān Qū) is a district of the city of Yantai, Shandong province. It has an area of 258 square kilometres (100 sq mi) and around 181,200 inhabitants (2003).

== Administrative divisions ==
As of 2012, this district is divided to 7 subdistricts.

== History ==
During the Xia and Shang dynasties, the territory was the land of Laiyi.

It was the land of Qi during the Spring and Autumn and Warring States period.

In the Qin Dynasty, it was the land of Chaoche County in Jiaodong County.

In the Western Han Dynasty, it was the land of Dongmou County in Donglai County.

In the Eastern Han Dynasty, it was the land of Dongmou County, Donglai County, Qingzhou.

During the Three Kingdoms Cao Wei, it was the land of Dongmou County, Donglai County, Qingzhou.

During the Western Jin Dynasty, the area was Huang County, Donglai County, Qingzhou.

In the Sui Dynasty, it was the land of Wendeng County of Donglai County.

In the Tang Dynasty, it was the land of Muping County, Dengzhou, Henan Province.

During the Northern Song Dynasty, it was the land of Muping County, Dengzhou, East Jingdong Road.

Jin for Shandong East Road Ninghai Prefecture Muping County.

During the Yuan Dynasty, it was the land of Muping County in Ninghai Prefecture.

In the Ming Dynasty, it was the land of Ninghai Prefecture in Dengzhou Province.

During the Qing Dynasty, it was the land of Ninghai Prefecture in Dengzhou Province, and belonged to Jingshan Township and Puji Township in Ninghai Prefecture.

Muping (Ninghai) County, Shandong Province during the Republic of China. In the 24th year of the Republic of China (1935), it belonged to the second and third districts of Muping County. In the thirty-first year of the Republic of China (1942), there were 12 districts in Muping County, belonging to the eleventh and twelfth districts. In the thirty-fourth year of the Republic of China (1945), it belonged to Qishan District, Guishan District and Cheese Hill District of Muping County. In the thirty-seventh year of the Republic of China (1948), it belonged to the thirteenth, fourteenth and fifteenth districts of Muping County.

After the founding of New China, the territory was successively assigned to Muping County, Zhifu District and Yantai City. 1958, Muping County was abolished and belonged to Yantai City. Choujia, Leshan and Xiejiazhuang People's Commune were established successively. In November of the following year, Muping County was restored and Xiejiazhuang Commune was transferred back to Muping County. 1962, Laishan Commune was transferred back to Muping County and in 1965, Choujia Commune was transferred back to Muping County. 1977, Choujia Commune was transferred to Yantai City (renamed Zhifu District in August 1983). 1984, after the abolition of people's communes and the establishment of towns, Choujia Town was under Zhifu District and Laishan Town and Xiejiazhuang Town were under Muping County. 1994, July In December 1994, Laishan District was formally established and listed, with three towns of Choujia, Laishan and Xiejiazhuang under its jurisdiction, and the district authorities were stationed in Choujia Town.

== Administrative divisions ==
=== Zoning history ===
In 1994, Laishan District had the jurisdiction of Chujia Town, Laishan Town and Xiejiazhuang Town, with 120 administrative villages.

In September 1999, approved by the provincial government, the town of Chujia was abolished and three streets were established: Chujia, Huanghai Road and Binhai Road.

In June 2000, Yantai High-tech Zone Shengquan Industrial Park was established.

In February 2001, the three villages of Nancai, Tianjiazhuang and Puzizhuang in Chujia Street were put under the jurisdiction of Shengquan Industrial Park.

In October 2002, Liangjia and Fulin, two communities on Huanghai Road Street, were placed under the jurisdiction of Zhifu District.

In December 2002, Yantai Leshan District Masan Industrial Park was established, and the seven administrative villages of Liujiabu, Ritupo, Yuejiazhuang, Wangjia Shazi, Huishibu, Masan and Xi Tanjiapo in Xiejiazhuang Town were assigned to the jurisdiction of Masan Industrial Park, and the four villages (communities) of Caojiazhuang, Qujiazhuang, East Majiadu and West Majiadu in Chujia Street were assigned to the jurisdiction of Shengquan Industrial Park.

In 2003, Yantai Laishan Economic Development Zone was established, with five communities of Nandian, Toyota, Puchang, Caojiazhuang and Qujiazhuang and two administrative villages of East Majiadu and West Majiadu under its jurisdiction.

=== Zoning status ===
As of October 2022, Laishan District has 6 streets under its jurisdiction. The People's Government of Laishan District is located at No. 24 Fenglin Road, Huanghai Road Street.

== Geography ==
=== Location realm ===
Leshan District borders Muping District of Yantai City to the east and south, Fushan District of Yantai City to the southwest, Zhifu District of Yantai City to the northwest, and the Yellow Sea to the northeast. Between 121°19′25″-121°33′29″E and 37°17′50″-37°31′40″N, the maximum distance between east and west is 15.9 km, and the maximum distance between north and south is 31 km, with a total area of 285.4 km2, of which 273.6 km2 is land, accounting for 95.9%; 11.8 square kilometers of water, accounting for 4.1%.

=== Terrain topography ===
The terrain of Leshan District is high in the southeast and low in the north. The terrain is divided into hilly and plain areas. The hilly area accounts for 53.1% of the total land area, and the plain accounts for 46.9%. The coastline is 21.50 kilometers long and belongs to the harbor coast.

=== Climate characteristics ===
Leshan District has a temperate East Asian monsoon type continental climate. The average annual temperature is 12.2 degrees Celsius and the frost-free period is 198 days. The average annual precipitation is 583mm. The average annual sunshine hours is 2602.2 hours.

=== River system ===
There are 11 large and small rivers in Leshan District, with a watershed area of 170 square kilometers and a reservoir capacity of 10.53 million cubic meters.

== Population ==
By the end of 2017, Laishan District Public Security Department registered 78,000 households with a registered population of 222,000, an increase of 3.9%. The birth population was 3,570, with a birth rate of 16.4‰; the death population was 1,535, with a mortality rate of 7‰; and the natural growth rate was 9.3‰.

According to the results of the seventh census, the resident population of the region was 389,494 as of 00:00 on November 1, 2020.

== Transportation ==
Laishan District is strategically located, with the Qingyan-Wei-Rong intercity railroad, Rongwu Expressway and Yanhai Expressway passing through the city, Yantai South Railway Station is located here, and Yantai Port and Railway Station are about 10 minutes away by car, and Yantai Penglai International Airport is about 40 minutes away by car, which allows easy access to major international and domestic cities and more than 100 ports.

In 2016, 41.8 km of provincial trunk roads and 32.4 km of highways were open to traffic in Laishan District. Air passenger throughput was 2.984 million, up 17.2%; cargo and mail volume was 40,000 tons, down 3.4%.

== Social business ==
=== Technology business ===
In 2022, 45 new provincial high-tech enterprises were identified in Laishan District, reaching 157 in the region. Undertake 12 projects of various science and technology plans, including 2 above the provincial level and 10 at the municipal level. The funding for scientific research projects is 14.3 million yuan, including 11 million yuan for provincial-level scientific research projects and 3.3 million yuan for municipal-level. 4 scientific and technological achievements were registered. Maintain 1,951 valid invention patents. By the end of 2022, the total number of high-level talents in the national talent project, provincial "Taishan scholars", "Taishan industry leading talents" and municipal "double hundred plan" reached 104.

=== Education ===
As of the end of 2022, there were 28,041 students enrolled in primary and secondary schools in Leshan District and 1,661 teaching staff.

=== Health ===
By the end of 2022, there were 430 health institutions with 1,659 beds and 3,099 health technicians in Leshan District.

=== Social security ===
In 2022, 8,651 people will be newly employed in Laishan District and the urban registered unemployment rate will be 0.71%.

=== Safe production ===
In 2021, there were 0 production safety responsibility accidents of various kinds in Leshan District, with 0 deaths and 0 direct economic losses of RMB 0 million.

== Scenic spots ==
=== Haichang Whale Shark Museum ===
The world's first marine science and technology museum with whale shark as its theme, the building shape adopts a unique nautilus shape and contains ten special functional exhibition areas. The Whale Shark Museum is the only theme museum in China where visitors can see whale sharks up close. Through the largest single acrylic glass in Asia, visitors can enjoy the sight of the largest fish, whale shark, swimming in a 3,000 cubic meter body of water. The 700-person Happy Theater features marine animal stars, sea lions, walruses and acrobatic clowns, performing humorous interactive sitcoms.

=== Destroyer Hefei ===
The first-generation missile destroyer designed and manufactured by China itself, sitting on the beach at the Yellow Sea Fun City scenic spot, is a patriotic education base and military tourism sightseeing base open to the public. The warship is equipped with 6 ship missiles, 2 twin guns, depth charges and can watch real mines up close. The military, working and living facilities of the warship can be visited at zero distance.

=== Yellow Sea Pearl ===
Towering at the eastern end of the Yellow Sea Trestle Bridge, it takes a modern architectural form with a stainless steel mesh frame structure and an outer body made of glass crystal inlay. The Pearl is 30 meters high and 21.8 meters in diameter, with six floors, tall and bright. The Pearl of the Yellow Sea is a famous landscape and landmark of Yantai.

=== Yanda International Sea Bathing Beach ===
The coastline is more than 10,000 meters from Haiyun Square in the north to Tianyue Bay in the south. The beach area is 640,000 square meters, the blue seawater is as clear as a mirror, and the soft beach is as white as silver. It carries out rich waterfront entertainment activities such as sea sightseeing, water sports, sea fishing, beach volleyball, beach soccer, surfing, speedboat, sailing, kayaking, diving and beach bonfire.

=== Phoenix Court ===
Located at the top of Phoenix Mountain, it is 24 meters high, a four-story pavilion imitating the ancient building of the Qing Dynasty, with flying eaves and arches, like a pen stand, green tiles and orange corridors, and green mountains and trees. 3,500 meters of hiking trails and 800 meters of wooden stacks, and a natural oxygen bar.

=== Yantai Sports Park ===
It is a national 3A-level scenic spot covering an area of 132.8 hectares, with a 40,000-seat central stadium, a 400-meter track and field practice field, a shooting gallery, a 10,000-seat multifunctional gymnasium, a 2,000-seat diving and swimming pool, an archery range, and a tennis stadium, capable of hosting large-scale games and cultural and commercial performances.

=== Yanda Seaside Forest Park ===
From Yantai University Gymnasium in the south to Ocean Garden Community in the north, it covers an area of about 21,000 square meters, with well-distributed natural beaches, green vegetation, and public buildings such as showers, stores and public toilets, creating a leisure place for tourists that combines tourism and vacation, summer vacation and health, and leisure and entertainment.

=== Yu Mei Plaza ===
Located in the middle section of Binhai Zhong Road, it covers an area of about 35,000 square meters, planting 2,600 seedlings with large shade and 13,000 flowering shrubs, constructing a self-propelled slow path, supporting leisure plazas, resting tables and chairs and other gardening accessories. Tulips, hyacinths and national chrysanthemums and other special flowers are planted.

== Local specialties ==
=== Purple stone house clam ===
Swan's egg, scientifically known as purple stone house clam, belongs to marine bivalve shellfish and is one of the valuable seafood along the coast of Yantai. It is distributed in a long and narrow water area between "Little Elephant Island" and Yangma Island in the back sea of Muping Yangma Island, with an area of about 100 acres. It is a cold water shellfish with strong cold tolerance.

=== Afu Little Watermelon ===
Early variety, green skin with thin stripes, bright red flesh, small oval-shaped melon, single melon weight 1.8-2.2 kg, extremely thin skin, sugar level of 12-14 degrees, storage and transportation.

== See also ==
- Yantai Laishan International Airport
