= Bir, Iran =

Bir بير
- Village
- Location within Iran
- Coordinates: 28°55′55″N 53°13′29″E
- Country: Iran
- Province: Fars
- County: Khafr
- Bakhsh: Central
- Rural District: Khafr

Population (2016)
  - Total: 412
- Time zone: UTC+3:30 (IRST)

Bir (Persian: بير, also Romanized as Bīr) is a village in Khafr Rural District of Khafr County, (formerly in Jahrom County), Fars province, Iran. At the 2016 census, its population was 412, in 120 families. Up from 381 people in 2006.
