= BRS Resources =

BRS Resources Ltd.
- Formerly: Bonanza Resources Corporation
- Type: Public
- Industry: Oil and gas
- Headquarters: Dallas, Texas, U.S.
- Key people: Steve Moore; Sioux Sinnott
- Products: Natural gas
- Website: www.brsresources.com

BRS Resources, Limited was a publicly traded, international exploration and production company headquartered in Dallas, Texas, and listed on the TSX Venture Exchange in Canada. The company is focused on building a European presence in the upstream oil and gas business, primarily natural gas production in Italy.

BRS Resources was actively pursuing opportunities in the Mediterranean Basin and North Africa, with its primary focus in Italy.

Italy has been a major gas-producing region in Europe since the late 1940s, with more than 4,300 wells drilled in several geologic provinces. The Po Valley is the most prolific gas basin in Italy with over 45 trillion cubic feet of gas recovered from high quality sandstone reservoirs at shallow depths.

== History ==
In February 2011, the company changed its name from Bonanza Resources Corporation to BRS Resources.

BRS Resources' first entry into the European market was through the purchase of a membership interest in AleAnna Resources LLC, a privately owned company with a portfolio of oil and gas assets strategically located in the Po Valley and Bradano basins of Italy. In July 2010, the company announced it had acquired interests in AleAnna Resources, which has assembled a land position currently encompassing 804,000 acres (3,254 km^{2}) in the Po Valley and Bradano basins of onshore Italy.

== Corporate leadership ==
In June 2010, Steve Moore joined the Board of Directors of BRS Resources and became the President of BRS Resources.

Moore has more than 25 years of financial experience in the oil and gas industry, including a position as editor of an oil and gas technical publication and director of communications and strategic planning for Halliburton Company. He has an engineering degree and MBA from Southern Methodist University in Dallas, Texas.

In February 2011, BRS Resources announced Sioux Sinnott as a Director of the company and as President of Bonanza Resources (Texas) Inc., a wholly owned subsidiary of BRS Resources Ltd.

Sinnott has more than 35 years of international oil and gas experience and was instrumental in securing the membership interest in AleAnna Energy LLC, placing BRS Resources in the second-largest land position onshore Italy. Sinnott's area of expertise is project management. Prior to joining BRS, she was the president of Heartland Rig International (HRI) Inc., a global manufacturer of drilling rigs and equipment. She also held positions at Arco Oil and Gas, Exxon Neftegaz Limited, Nimir Petroleum and Petrosakh USA. She attended Southern Methodist University in Dallas.

== Projects ==
=== Le Saline and Tre Ponti ===
In August 2006, the Tre Ponti and the Le Saline exploration permit applications were filed with the Ministry of Economic Development and subsequently published in the Official Bulletin of Hydrocarbons and Geothermal Resources No. L – 9. Awarding of both permits was expected in the fourth quarter of 2011.

Directly north of the Ponte del Diavolo and Corte dei Signori permits, the 742.8 km^{2} (286.8 sq mi) Tre Ponti and the 616.8 km^{2} (238.1 sq mi) Le Saline exploration permit applications are primarily located in the Veneto Region and some of the Emilia-Romagna Region.

=== Fantozza ===
In December 2010, the 102.4 km^{2} (39.5 sq mi) Fantozza exploration permit was awarded and published in the Official Bulletin of Hydrocarbons and Geothermal Resources LIV-12.

Found in the central Po Valley Basin, the Fantozza concession is a topographically flat area, typical of the Po Valley landscape, again, with exploration targets in the Miocene, Pliocene and Pleistocene turbidites. Deeper targets in the Mesozoic limestone may also be considered.

=== Molino ===
In July 2010, the 24.35 km^{2} (9.40 sq mi) Molino exploration permit was awarded, adjacent to the Cortemaggiore field, one of the oldest and largest existing fields in the basin, having produced nearly 12 million barrels of oil, 371 Bcf of natural gas and 80,000 barrels of condensate from 1949 to 1992 from several Miocene sands.

=== Ponte Del Diavolo ===
Northwest of the Corte dei Signori permit area, the Ponte del Diavolo permit was awarded on February 2, 2009. This permit covers an area of 199.80 km^{2} (77.14 sq mi) with natural gas exploration targets within the Plio-Pleistocene turbiditic sands of the Apennines foredeep. On trend with large existing gas fields, this makes for a very attractive permit area.

Acquisition of a new 3-D seismic survey is planned for 2011.

=== Belgioiosa ===
In December 2010, the Belgioioso exploration permit covering 322.5 km^{2} (124.5 sq mi) in the Emilia Romagna Region and Lombardia Region was awarded and published in the Official Bulletin of Hydrocarbons and Geothermal Resources No. LIV-12.

Primary targets in Belgioioso block are located in the Miocene, Plio-Pleistocene turbiditic sands of the Apennines foredeep. Related to the final phases of the Apenninic orogeny, the traps can be either structural or mixed.

=== Bugia ===
In October 2010, the 197.8 km^{2} (76.4 sq mi) Bugia exploration permit was awarded and published in the Official Bulletin of Hydrocarbons and Geothermal Resources No. LIV – 10.

It is anticipated that in the Bugia block the likely hydrocarbon targets will again be located in the Miocene, Plio-Pleistocene turbiditic sands of the Apennines foredeep. Related to the final phases of the Apenninic orogeny, the traps can be either structural or mixed.

=== Ponte dei Grilli ===
Covering a surface of 258.45 km^{2} (99.79 sq mi) in the south-eastern region of the Po Valley, the Ponte dei Grilli exploration permit was awarded March 2009.

Also on trend with large existing fields, the exploration targets in the Ponte dei Grilli permit area are gas accumulations trapped in thrusted anticlines, stratigraphic pinch outs and structural features in the Plio-Pleistocene turbiditic sands located in the Apennines foredeep.

=== Corte dei Signori ===
In March 2008, the Corte dei Signori exploration permit was awarded.

Seeking a better definition of the existing hydrocarbon traps in the Plio-Pleistocene as well as older sections, the company acquired 130.00 km^{2} (50.19 sq mi) of high-resolution 3-D seismic in 2009. Utilizing this new data, several prospective areas in the block have been identified with the first well planned to be drilled in the first half of 2011.

In December 2011, BRS Resources announced that the drilling permit for the company's first well in Italy – the Gallare 6d – had been issued by the Italian Ministry of Economic Development. The permit was issued to the operator AleAnna Resources LLC, an Italian oil and gas exploration company in which BRS Resources owns a membership interest. At the same time, AleAnna finalized a land usage agreement with the landowner.
