= Konarak, Iran =

City in Sistan and Baluchestan province, Iran

Konarak کنارک
- City
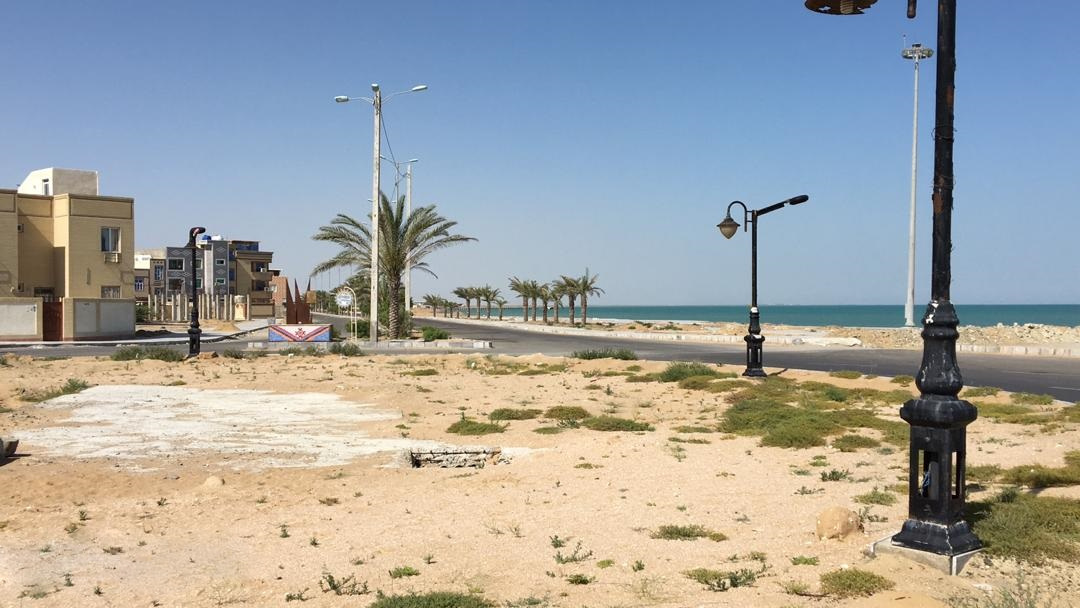
- The shoreline in Konarak County, Iran

- Location within Iran
- Coordinates: 25°21′32″N 60°23′57″E
- Country: Iran
- Province: Sistan and Baluchestan
- County: Konarak
- District: Central

Population (2016)
  - Total: 43,258
- Time zone: UTC+3:30 (IRST)

Konarak (Persian: کنارک, Balochi: کونارک) is a city and the capital of Konarak County in Sistan and Baluchestan province of Iran.

== Climate ==
Konarak has a hot desert climate (BWh) in the Köppen climate classification.

Climate data for Konarak (1984–2005 normals)
Month	Jan	Feb	Mar	Apr	May	Jun	Jul	Aug	Sep	Oct	Nov	Dec	Year
Daily mean °C (°F)	18.9 (66.0)	20.3 (68.5)	23.7 (74.7)	27.8 (82.0)	31.2 (88.2)	33.0 (91.4)	31.9 (89.4)	30.5 (86.9)	29.7 (85.5)	27.9 (82.2)	24.0 (75.2)	20.6 (69.1)	26.6 (79.9)
Average precipitation mm (inches)	20.6 (0.81)	22.3 (0.88)	21.4 (0.84)	0.8 (0.03)	0.0 (0.0)	0.0 (0.0)	4.1 (0.16)	1.4 (0.06)	0.0 (0.0)	2.4 (0.09)	5.1 (0.20)	19.0 (0.75)	97.1 (3.82)
Average relative humidity (%)	62	62	62	59	62	67	72	73	71	65	62	63	38.9
Source: IRIMO

== Demographics ==
=== Language and ethnicity ===
Like in nearby Pakistan's Balochistan province, the overwhelming majority of the city's inhabitants are ethnic Baloch who speak the Balochi language.

=== Population ===
At the time of the 2006 National Census, the city's population was 28,685 in 6,044 households. The following census in 2011 counted 35,630 people in 7,975 households. The 2016 census measured the population of the city as 43,258 people in 9,954 households.

Konarak is on the western coast of Chabahar Bay, facing Chabahar Port to the East, on the Makran coast on the Gulf of Oman, about 50 km West of the Iran-Pakistan coastal border line.

Konarak Airport is a military airbase (see below), which also has civilian flights.

== Military ==
Iran's military (army, navy, air force) have had bases in Konarak since before the Iranian Revolution; built with the support of Western engineering, construction and logistics firms such as Brown & Root.

The Iranian Navy also has a related base in Pasabandar, further east and very close to the border with Pakistan. The support vessel Konarak was named in the city's honour; the Konarak was destroyed in a 2020 accident.

The 3rd Marine Brigade special forces unit of the Iranian Navy is stationed in Konarak
