= Kahir District =

District in Sistan and Baluchestan province, Iran

Kahir District Persian: بخش کهیر
- District
- Location within Iran
- Coordinates: 25°32′56″N 59°55′23″E
- Country: Iran
- Province: Sistan and Baluchestan
- County: Konarak
- Capital: Kahir
- Time zone: UTC+3:30 (IRST)

Kahir District (Persian: بخش کهیر) is in Konarak County, Sistan and Baluchestan province, Iran. Its capital is the village of Kahir, whose population at the time of the 2016 National Census was 2,213 people in 451 households.

== History ==
After the 2016 census, Kahir Rural District was separated from the Central District in the formation of Kahir District.

== Demographics ==
=== Administrative divisions ===
Kahir District
Administrative Divisions
Kahir RD
Tang RD
RD = Rural District
