= Patrolling =

Military tactic

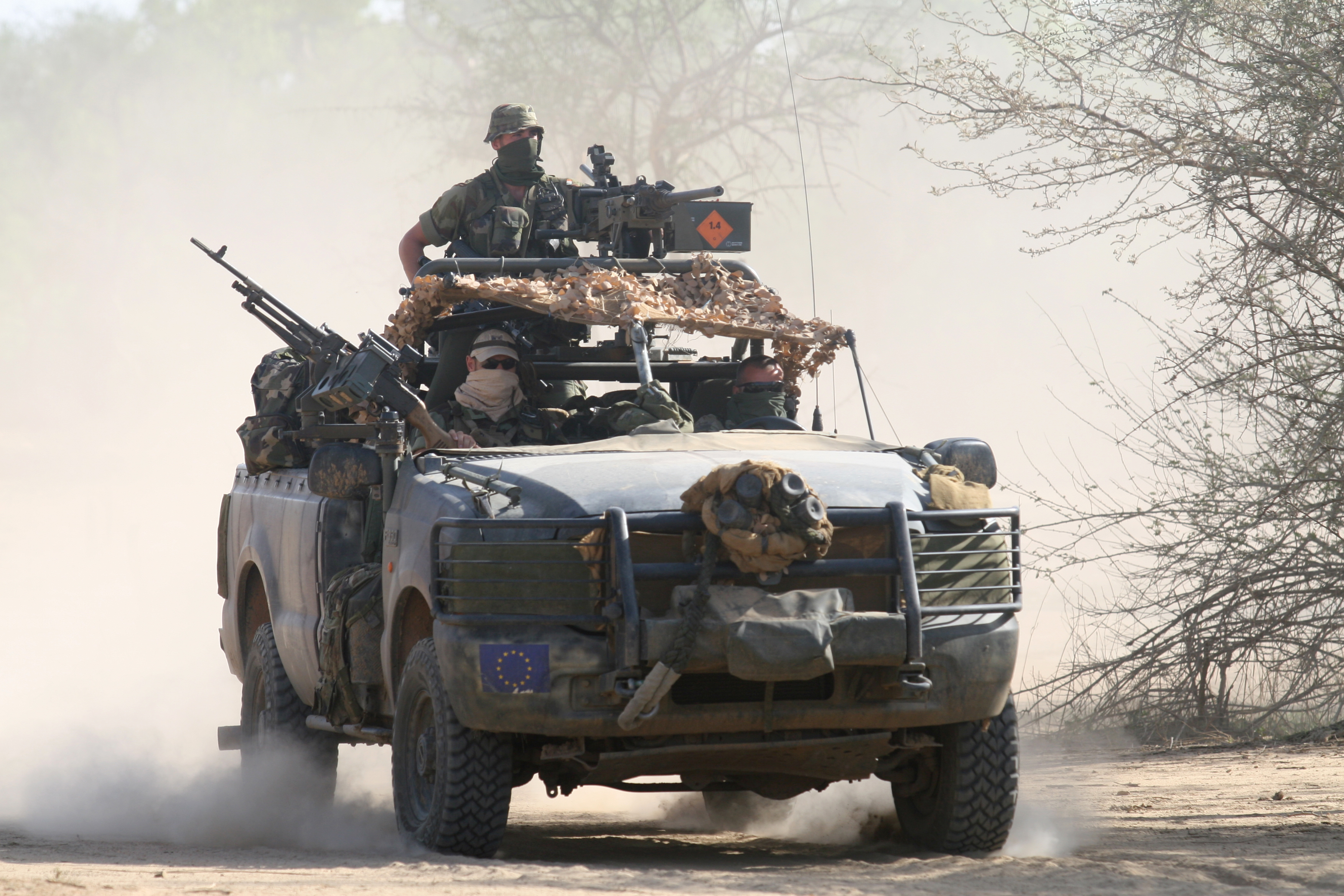
Irish Army Ranger Wing soldiers on patrol in Chad, May 2008

Patrolling is a military tactic. Small groups or individual units are deployed from a larger formation to achieve a specific objective and then return. The tactic of patrolling may be applied to ground troops, armored units, naval units, and combat aircraft. The duration of a patrol will vary from a few hours to several weeks depending on the nature of the objective and the type of units involved.

There are several different types of patrol each with a different objective. The most common is to collect information by carrying out a reconnaissance patrol. Such a patrol may try to remain clandestine and observe an enemy without themselves being detected. Other reconnaissance patrols are overt, especially those that interact with the civilian population.

== Ground patrol types ==
A combat patrol is a group with sufficient size (usually platoon or company) and resources to raid or ambush a specific enemy. It primarily differs from an attack in that the aim is not to hold ground.

A clearing patrol is a brief patrol around a newly occupied defensive position in order to ensure that the immediate area is secure. Clearing patrols are often undertaken on the occupation of a location, and during stand to in the transition from night to day routine and vice versa.

A standing patrol is a static patrol, probably known as an OP/LP(Observation Post/Listening post) in US and NATO terminology. Standing patrols are usually small (half section/section) static patrols intended to provide early warning, security or to guard some geographical feature, such as dead ground.

A reconnaissance (recce) patrol is a patrol, usually small whose main mission is the gathering of information. Generally speaking recce patrols tend to avoid contact, although it is not unknown for recon patrols to "fight for information".

A screening patrol combines a number of patrols to 'screen' a large area. This type of patrol is used by armored formations in desert theaters, and also by ground troops operating in urban areas. A screen is generally composed of a number of static observation posts.

A contact patrol is similar in many ways to a reconnaissance (recce) patrol in that it both locates the position of an enemy force, and/or then maintains contact with that force. As stated above, a reconnaissance patrol generally avoids disclosing its own position if possible, whereas a contact patrol is more likely to maintain contact with enemy forces through direct and/or indirect fire.

== Aviation patrol types ==
A combat air patrol (CAP) involves fighter aircraft flying a defensive screen over a critical area, for instance a carrier battle group, for the purpose of intercepting and destroying hostile aircraft before they reach their target. There are numerous specific variations of the basic CAP, for instance HVAACAP or "High Value Airborne Asset CAP", designed to protect highly vulnerable E-3 AWACS or E-8 J-STARS aircraft whilst airborne.

A contact patrol in aviation terms, was a term used by British and French forces around 1915–18 during World War I. Aircraft would fly low over the battlefield searching for the position of friendly ground units that had advanced to where they were no longer in direct contact with their own HQ. These ground units would identify themselves to the aircraft by means of flares, mirrors, signalling lamps, strips of cloth and signalling panels. In some cases infantry wore shiny tin discs on the back of their equipment, designed to be visible from the air. Contact patrol aircraft found that the infantry was much more willing to light flares when called forth by klaxon and observers found that they could identify troops at 700 feet (210 m). Messages from the signalling panels could be read up to a height of 6,000 feet (1,800 m). In turn these aircraft would relay updated positions and any messages back to Brigade HQ, sometimes using early wireless equipment (morse), but also by dropping hand-written notes or maps to pre-arranged report centres on the ground.

== See also ==
- List of military tactics
- Observation post
- Maritime patrol
