= Jahliyan Rural District =

Rural district in Sistan and Baluchestan province, Iran

Jahliyan Rural District Persian: دهستان جهليان
- Rural District
- Location within Iran
- Coordinates: 25°24′30″N 60°24′30″E
- Country: Iran
- Province: Sistan and Baluchestan
- County: Konarak
- District: Central
- Capital: Jahliyan

Population (2016)
  - Total: 21,361
- Time zone: UTC+3:30 (IRST)

Jahliyan Rural District (Persian: دهستان جهليان) is in the Central District of Konarak County, Sistan and Baluchestan province, Iran. Its capital is the village of Jahliyan.

== Demographics ==
=== Population ===
At the time of the 2006 National Census, the rural district's population was 13,629 in 2,723 households. There were 17,789 inhabitants in 3,999 households at the time of the following 2011 national census. The 2016 census measured the population of the rural district as 21,361 inhabitants in 5,284 households. The most populous of its 54 villages was Pozm-e Tiab, with 2,912 people.

== See also ==
Hamidabad, (Note: Formerly Hamidgu) a village in this rural district
