= Kahir Rural District =

Rural district in Sistan and Baluchestan province, Iran

Kahir Rural District Persian: دهستان كهير
- Rural District
- Location within Iran
- Coordinates: 25°33′N 60°04′E
- Country: Iran
- Province: Sistan and Baluchestan
- County: Konarak
- District: Kahir
- Capital: Bursar Heydari

Population (2016)
  - Total: 13,396
- Time zone: UTC+3:30 (IRST)

Kahir Rural District (Persian: دهستان كهير) is in Kahir District of Konarak County, Sistan and Baluchestan province, Iran. Its capital is the village of Bursar Heydari. The previous capital of the rural district was the village of Kahir.

== Demographics ==
=== Population ===
At the time of the 2006 National Census, the rural district's population (as a part of the Central District) was 10,799 in 2,161 households. There were 11,055 inhabitants in 2,579 households at the following census of 2011. The 2016 census measured the population of the rural district as 13,396 in 3,299 households. The most populous of its 41 villages was Kahir, with 2,213 people.

After the census, the rural district was separated from the district in the formation of Kahir District.
