= Konarak County =

County in Sistan and Baluchestan province, Iran

Konarak County Persian: شهرستان کنارک
- County
- Location of Konarak County in Sistan and Baluchestan province (bottom, green)

- Location of Sistan and Baluchestan province in Iran
- Coordinates: 25°31′30″N 60°10′25″E
- Country: Iran
- Province: Sistan and Baluchestan
- Capital: Konarak
- Districts: Central

Population (2016)
  - Total: 98,212
- Time zone: UTC+3:30 (IRST)

Konarak County (Persian: شهرستان کنارک) is in Sistan and Baluchestan province, Iran. Its capital is the city of Konarak.

== History ==
After the 2006 National Census, the village of Jahelu was elevated to city status as Zarabad.

After the 2016 census, Zarabad District (Note: Renamed the Central District of Zarabad County) was separated from the county in the establishment of Zarabad County. At the same time, Bansont Rural District was created in the Central District, and Kahir Rural District was separated from it in the formation of Kahir District, including the new Tang Rural District. The new city of Shahr-e Jadid-e Tis was formed in the Central District.

== Demographics ==
=== Population ===
At the 2006 census, the county's population was 68,605 in 31,449 households. The following census in 2011 counted 82,001 people in 18,704 households. At the 2016 census, the population of the county was 98,212 in 23,600 households.

=== Administrative divisions ===
Konarak County's population history and administrative structure over three consecutive censuses are shown in the following table.

Konarak County Population
Administrative Divisions	2006	2011	2016
Central District	53,113	64,474	78,015
Bansont RD (Note: Established after the 2016 census)			
Jahliyan RD	13,629	17,789	21,361
Kahir RD	10,799	11,055	13,396
Konarak (city)	28,685	35,630	43,258
Shahr-e Jadid-e Tis (city) (Note: Established after the 2016 census)			
Kahir District			
Kahir RD			
Tang RD			
Zarabad District (Note: Transferred to Zarabad County)	15,492	17,527	20,197
Zarabad-e Gharbi RD (Note: Formerly Zarabad Rural District)	8,997	8,614	8,983
Zarabad-e Sharqi RD	6,495	5,691	7,211
Zarabad (city)		3,222	4,003
Total	68,605	82,001	98,212
RD = Rural District

== See also ==
Media related to Konarak County at Wikimedia Commons
