= Central District (Konarak County) =

District in Sistan and Baluchestan province, Iran

Central District (Konarak County) Persian: بخش مرکزی شهرستان کنارک
- District
- Location within Iran
- Coordinates: 25°31′30″N 60°28′04″E
- Country: Iran
- Province: Sistan and Baluchestan
- County: Konarak
- Capital: Konarak

Population (2016)
  - Total: 78,015
- Time zone: UTC+3:30 (IRST)

The Central District of Konarak County (Persian: بخش مرکزی شهرستان کنارک) is in Sistan and Baluchestan province, Iran. Its capital is the city of Konarak.

== History ==
After the 2016 National Census, Bansont Rural District was created in the district, and Kahir Rural District was separated from it in the formation of Kahir District. The new city of Shahr-e Jadid-e Tis was formed in the Central District.

== Demographics ==
=== Population ===
At the time of the 2006 census, the district's population was 53,113 in 10,928 households. The following census in 2011 counted 64,474 people in 14,553 households. The 2016 census measured the population of the district as 78,015 inhabitants in 18,537 households.

=== Administrative divisions ===
Central District (Konarak County) Population
Administrative Divisions	2006	2011	2016
Bansont RD (Note: Established after the 2016 census)			
Jahliyan RD	13,629	17,789	21,361
Kahir RD (Note: Transferred to Kahir District after the 2016 census)	10,799	11,055	13,396
Konarak (city)	28,685	35,630	43,258
Shahr-e Jadid-e Tis (city) (Note: Established after the 2016 census)			
Total	53,113	64,474	78,015
RD = Rural District
