= Serhii Volynskyi =

Ukrainian military commander (born 1992)

Serhii Volynskyi Сергій Волинський
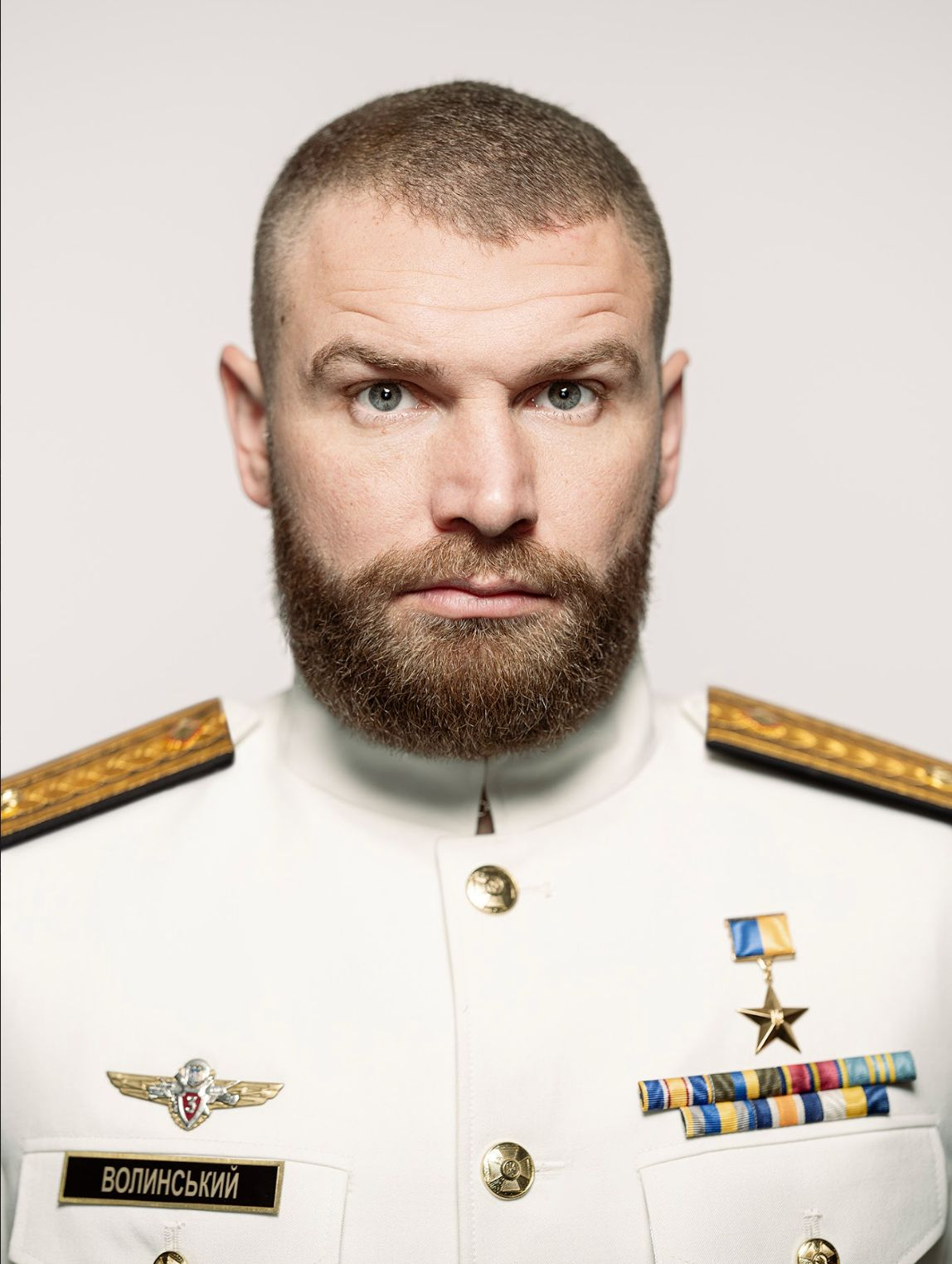
- Born: 31 January 1992 (age 34); Poltava, Ukraine
- Military career
- Allegiance: Ukraine
- Branch: Ukrainian Naval Infantry
- Rank: Major
- Unit: 36th Separate Marine Brigade
- Conflicts: Russo-Ukrainian War; War in Donbas; Russian invasion of Ukraine; Siege of Mariupol (POW)
- Awards: Order for Courage; Order of Bohdan Khmelnytsky; Medal For Military Service to Ukraine; Hero of Ukraine

Serhii Yaroslavovych Volynskyi (Ukrainian: Сергій Ярославович Волинський; born 31 January 1992), also known as Serhii Volyna (Сергій Волина) is a Ukrainian officer, Hero of Ukraine (2022), known for his role during the siege of Mariupol, in which he commanded the 36th Separate Marine Brigade.

== Biography ==
Volynskyi was stationed in Crimea in 2014, when the peninsula was taken over by Russia, and subsequently participated in the War in Donbas.

At the start of the Russian invasion of Ukraine, in February 2022, he held the rank of major and was stationed in Mariupol, serving with the 36th Separate Marine Brigade. He fought during the siege of Mariupol and on 12 April 2022 he led a successful breakout from the Illich steel plant in which about 500 soldiers of the brigade were able to link up with the Azov Regiment holding out in the Azovstal steel plant. Following the capture of his superior Volodymyr Baranyuk during the breakout attempt, Volynskyi became the new commander of the depleted brigade. Shortly after reaching Azovstal, Volynskyi released a joint statement along with Lieutenant Colonel Denys Prokopenko, commander of the Azov Regiment, vowing to fight on.

During the siege of Azovstal, the last remaining Ukrainian stronghold within Mariupol, Volynskyi repeatedly made appeals for the evacuation of the wounded soldiers and civilians who had taken refuge in the plant. On 18 April he wrote a message to Pope Francis asking to "save the people of Mariupol", and two days later he asked Volodymyr Zelenskyy as well as Joe Biden, Recep Tayyip Erdogan and Boris Johnson to take action to deblockade the city. On 27 April he released another video message in which he asked for an extraction operation for all civilians and soldiers who resisted in Mariupol, citing the Dunkirk evacuation, and stated that there were over six hundred wounded among the soldiers, in desperate need of medical care. On 8 May, after the civilians had been evacuated, he once again asked "that a higher power find a way to figure out our rescue", stating "it feels like I've landed in a hellish reality show in which us soldiers fight for our lives and the whole world watches this interesting episode. Pain, suffering, hunger, misery, tears, fears, death. It's all real."

On 20 May 2022, Volynskyi surrendered to the Russian forces along with the last defenders of the Azovstal steel plant, marking the end of the battle for Mariupol after nearly three months. He spent 4 months of captivity by the Russian Federation as a prisoner of war. Volynskyi was released in a prisoner exchange on 21 September 2022. Under the terms of the deal, it was agreed that he, along with 4 other officers released in the exchange, would remain in Turkey until the end of the war.

On 8 July 2023, during a trip to Turkey to meet President Erdogan, Ukrainian president Zelenskyy announced that he was bringing back the five Azov commanders to Ukraine, including Volynskyi.

== Awards ==
- On 1 October 2022, he was made a Hero of Ukraine by President Volodymyr Zelenskyy.
- Order of Bohdan Khmelnytsky 3rd class (May 3, 2022).
- Order for Courage 3rd class (December 25, 2015).

Military offices
Preceded by Volodymyr Baranyuk	Commander of 36th Separate Marine Brigade; 13 April—20 May 2022	Succeeded by
