= Siege of Mariupol =

Siege in the Russian invasion of Ukraine

- Part of the southern front of the Russo-Ukrainian war
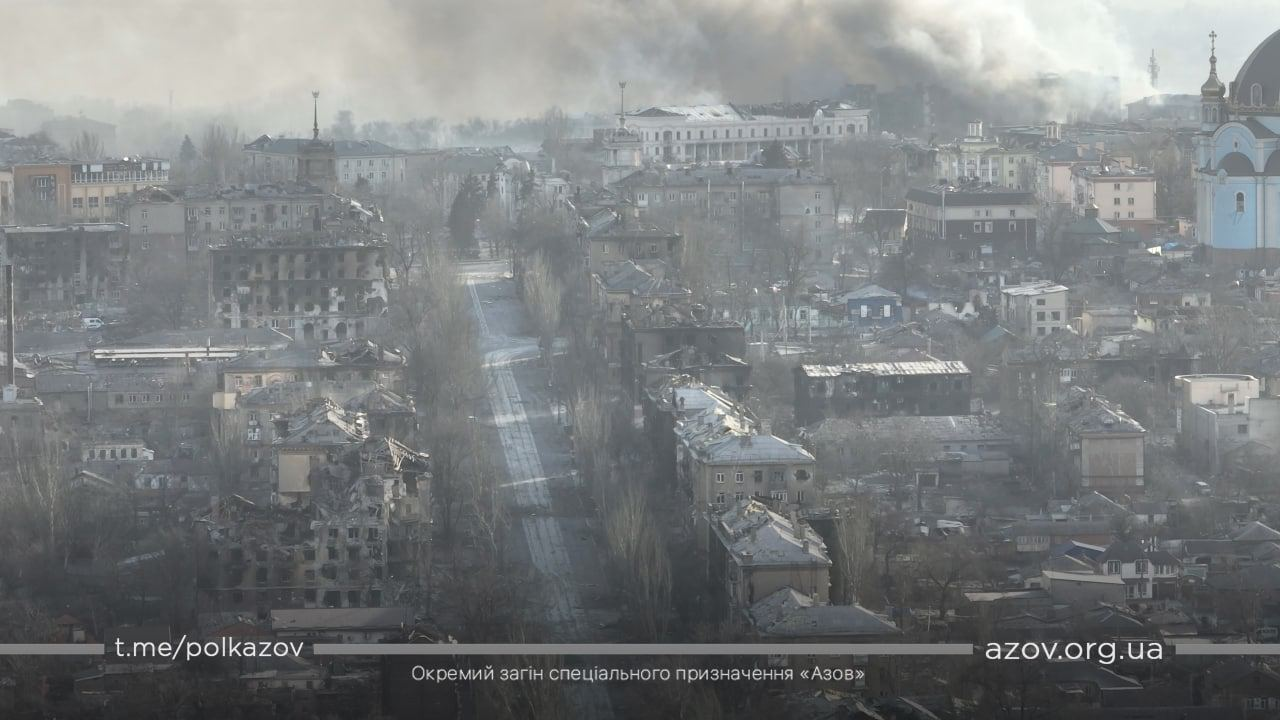
- Damaged buildings in Mariupol, 16 March 2022
Date	24 February – 20 May 2022 (2 months, 3 weeks and 5 days)
Location	Mariupol, Donetsk Oblast, Ukraine 47°05′51″N 37°36′36″E
Result	Russian victory
Territorial changes	Russia captures the city of Mariupol

Belligerents
Russia; Donetsk People's Republic	Ukraine

Commanders and leaders
Mikhail Mizintsev	Volodymyr Baranyuk (POW); Serhii Volynskyi (POW); Denys Prokopenko (POW)

Units involved
(Russia) Russian Armed Forces: 58th Guards Combined Arms Army; 150th Guards Motor Rifle Division; 810th Guards Naval Infantry Brigade; North Battalion; 3rd Guards Spetsnaz Brigade; Russian Air Force; DPR People's Militia: Somalia Battalion; Sparta Battalion; Vostok Brigade	(Ukraine) Ukrainian Armed Forces; Inside Mariupol: 36th Separate Marine Brigade; 501st Separate Naval Infantry Battalion; Azov Regiment (Note: National Guard of Ukraine); 12th Operational Brigade; 23rd Public Order Protection Brigade; 15th Operational Brigade; 17th Tank Brigade; National Police and State Border Guard forces; Other involved units: 10th Assault Brigade; 56th Motorized Brigade; 73rd Naval Special Operations Regiment; Georgian Legion; Territorial Defense Forces; Ukrainian Volunteer Corps

Strength
14,000	3,500–4,400 (Note: Extrapolated from Ukrainian and international figures of casualties as explained below.) Per Russia: 8,000

Casualties and losses
Per Ukraine: 6,500 killed 80 tanks destroyed 100 other armoured vehicles destroyed	Per Russia: 4,200+ killed, (Note: More than 4,000 claimed killed before the start of the Azovstal siege mid-April, with another 152 bodies said to be found following the Azovstal siege, for a total of 4,152+ claimed killed (rounded to 4,200, representing an appropriate degree of precision).); 3,917 captured (Note: 1,478 claimed surrendered before the start of the Azovstal siege mid-April, with another 2,439 said to have surrendered following the Azovstal siege, for a total of 3,917 prisoners claimed taken.); 277 defected Per Ukraine: 906+ killed, 3,500+ captured, 1 defected
- Per United Nations: 1,348 civilians killed confirmed (total number thought "thousands higher"); Per Russia: 3,000+ civilians killed Per Ukraine: 25,000+ civilians killed 50,000+ deported Per Uppsala Conflict Data Program: 27,000 to 88,000 total deaths (95% of which are civilians) Per Mariupol Justice Initiative: 12,500 confirmed killed or missing people

The siege of Mariupol began on 24 February 2022, as part of the Russian invasion of Ukraine, and lasted until 20 May. It saw fighting between the Russian Armed Forces (alongside the Donetsk People's Republic People's Militia) and the Ukrainian Armed Forces for control over the city of Mariupol in southeastern Ukraine. Lasting for almost three months, the siege ended in a victory for Russia and the Donetsk People's Republic (DPR), as Ukraine lost control of the city amidst Russia's eastern Ukraine offensive and southern Ukraine offensive; all Ukrainian troops remaining in the city surrendered at the Azovstal Iron and Steel Works on 20 May 2022, after they were ordered to cease fighting.

Mariupol is located in Ukraine's Donetsk Oblast, and following the siege, it was initially controlled by the DPR, supported by occupying Russian troops. However, it was later subjected to Russia's annexation of southeastern Ukraine, and remains under direct Russian control as of 2026.

During the Russian siege, the Red Cross described the situation in Mariupol as "apocalyptic" while Ukrainian authorities accused Russia of engineering a major humanitarian crisis in the city. Ukrainian officials reported that approximately 25,000 civilians had been killed and that at least 95% of the city had been destroyed during the fighting, primarily by large-scale Russian bombardments. In an official statement, the United Nations confirmed the deaths of 1,348 civilians in Mariupol, but warned that the true death toll was likely thousands higher while also reporting that 90% of the city's residential buildings had been damaged or completely destroyed.

Major combat operations in the city effectively ended on 16 May 2022, after Ukraine's Azov Regiment surrendered at the Azovstal Iron and Steel Works. Some Western reports described the siege as a pyrrhic or symbolic Russian victory, with others noting that the humanitarian impact of the takeover was a "reputational disaster" for Russia. Nonetheless, the loss of the city was a significant defeat for Ukraine.

Numerous Russian war crimes were alleged, including unlawful attacks on civilians, killings, blocking of humanitarian aid, forced displacement or deportation, looting and rape. Based on the analysis of mass graves, Human Rights Watch estimated at least 10,284 people died in Mariupol from March 2022 to February 2023, but assumes that is an undercount.

== Background ==
Mariupol is considered a major strategic city and therefore was a target for Russian forces. It was the largest city in the Ukrainian-controlled portion of Donetsk Oblast, (Note: The largest city de jure in Donetsk Oblast is Donetsk, which has been de facto held by the DPR since 2014.) and was also one of the largest Russian-speaking cities in Ukraine. Mariupol was a major industrial hub, home of the Illich and Azovstal iron and steel works, and the largest city on the Sea of Azov.

Control of its port on the western shore of the Sea of Azov is vital to the economy of Ukraine. For Russia, it would allow a land route to Crimea and full control over the sea, thereby facilitating passage of Russian marine traffic.

In 2014 after the Revolution of Dignity, Mariupol was swept by pro-Russian protests against the new government. Tensions erupted into the war in Donbas in early May, and during the unrest, militiamen of the separatist and Russian-backed DPR took control of the city and forced Ukrainian troops to abandon it during the first battle for Mariupol. However, the following month, Ukrainian forces recaptured the city in an offensive. In August, the DPR and Russian troops captured the village of Novoazovsk, 45 km east of Mariupol near the Russo-Ukrainian border.

With the town captured and forces renewed, in September the DPR attempted to capture the city again in the second battle for Mariupol. Fighting reached the eastern outskirts, but the separatists were repelled. In October, then-DPR Prime Minister Alexander Zakharchenko vowed to retake the city. Mariupol was then indiscriminately bombed by rockets in January 2015. Fearing a future third offensive into Mariupol, in February Ukrainian forces launched a surprise attack into Shyrokyne, a village located 11 km east of Mariupol. Their objective was the expulsion of separatist forces from the city limits and the creation of a buffer zone. The separatists withdrew from Shyrokyne four months later. The conflict was frozen when the Minsk II ceasefire agreement was signed in 2015.

2018 saw renewed tension in the region around Mariupol, as the Russian Federal Security Service (FSB) coast guard fired upon and captured three Ukrainian Navy vessels after they attempted to transit from the Black Sea into the Sea of Azov through the Kerch Strait on their way to the port of Mariupol. The Kerch Strait incident raised tensions; fearing war, Ukraine briefly declared martial law.

One of the most instrumental groups for the recapture and subsequent defence of Mariupol was Azov Battalion, a Ukrainian volunteer militia, controversial for its openly neo-Nazi and ultranationalist members. By November 2014 Azov was integrated into the National Guard of Ukraine, with Mariupol as its headquarters. As one of Vladimir Putin's stated goals for the invasion was the "denazification" of Ukraine, Mariupol represented an important ideological and symbolical target for the Russian forces.

Prior to the siege, around 100,000 residents left Mariupol, according to the city's deputy mayor.

Prior to falling to Russian forces, the city was defended by the Ukrainian Ground Forces, the Ukrainian Naval Infantry, the National Guard of Ukraine (primarily the Azov Regiment), the Territorial Defense Forces of Ukraine, and irregular forces.

== Advances to Mariupol ==
=== Preliminary shelling and advance on the city ===
On 24 February, the day the invasion began, Russian artillery bombarded the city, reportedly injuring 26 people.

On the morning of 25 February, Russian forces advanced from DPR territory in the east towards Mariupol. They encountered Ukrainian forces near the village of Pavlopil, who repelled the Russian advance. The mayor of Mariupol, Vadym Boychenko, said 22 Russian tanks had been destroyed in the skirmish. That evening, the Russian Navy, drawing on the capabilities provided by the Black Sea Fleet, reportedly began an amphibious assault on the Sea of Azov coastline 70 kilometres (43 mi) west of Mariupol. A US defence official stated that the Russians may have deployed thousands of marines from this beachhead.

On 26 February, Russian forces continued to bombard Mariupol with artillery. Later, the government of Greece announced that 10 ethnic Greek civilians had been killed by Russian strikes at Mariupol – six in the village of Sartana and four in the village of Buhas.

On the morning of 27 February, mayor Boychenko said that a Russian tank column had advanced on Mariupol from the DPR but were repulsed by Ukrainian forces, with six Russian soldiers captured. Later that day, a six-year-old girl in Mariupol was killed by Russian shelling. Pavlo Kyrylenko, governor of Donetsk Oblast, stated that fighting in Mariupol had continued throughout the night of 27 February.

Throughout 28 February, the city remained under Ukrainian control despite being surrounded by Russian troops and constantly shelled. Electricity, gas, and internet connection to most of the city was cut during the evening. Later, according to Radio Free Europe/Radio Liberty, Russian Major General Andrei Sukhovetsky was killed by a Ukrainian sniper near Mariupol, but other sources said that he had been killed during the Kyiv offensive.

=== Mariupol surrounded ===
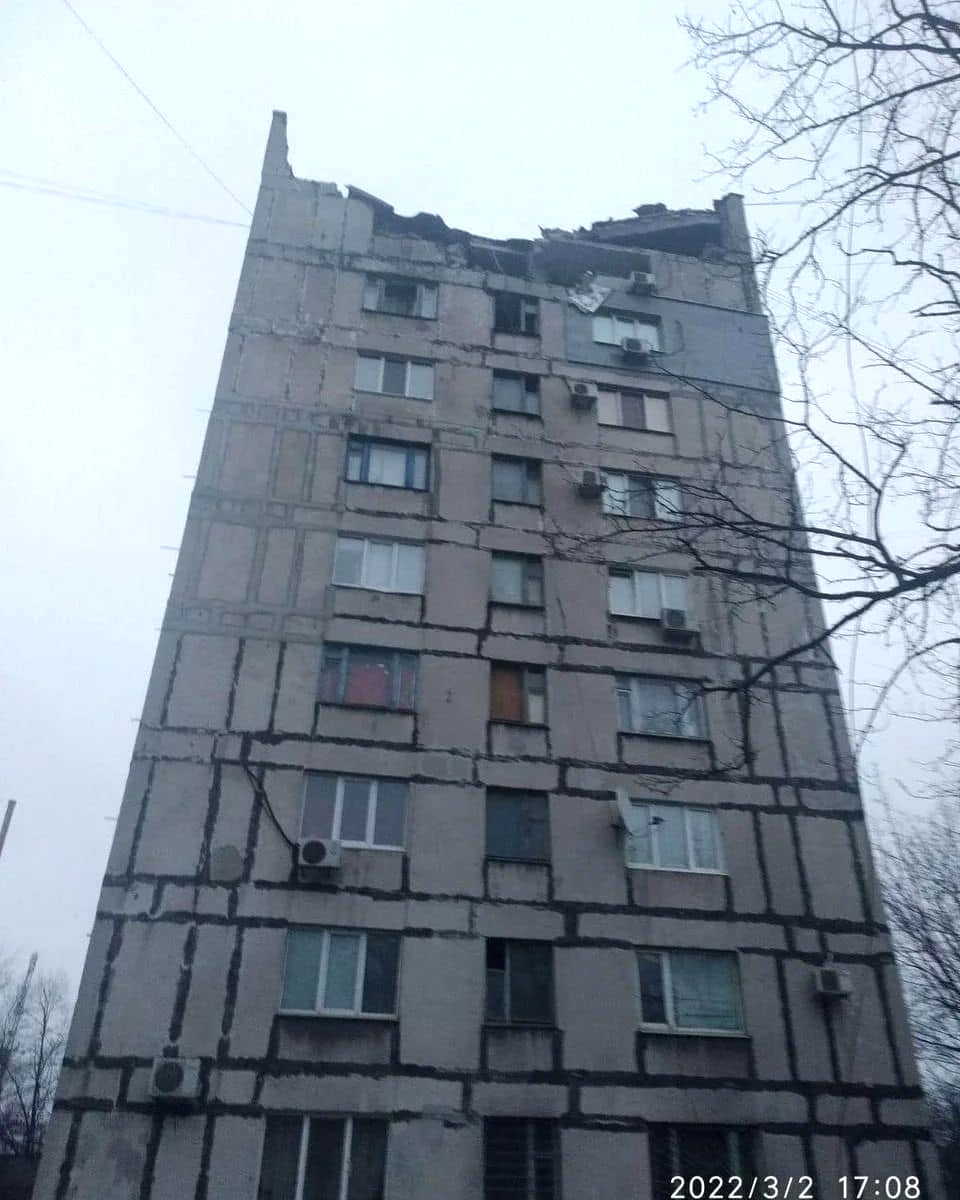
An apartment building damaged during shelling in Mariupol, 2 March 2022

On 1 March, Denis Pushilin, the head of the DPR, announced that DPR forces had almost surrounded the nearby city of Volnovakha and would soon do the same to Mariupol. Russian artillery later bombarded Mariupol, causing over 21 injuries.

The city was fully surrounded on 2 March, after which the siege intensified. Russian shelling killed a teenager and wounded two other teenagers who were playing soccer outside. Boychenko announced the city was suffering from a water outage and had experienced massive casualties. He also said Russian forces were preventing civilians from exiting.

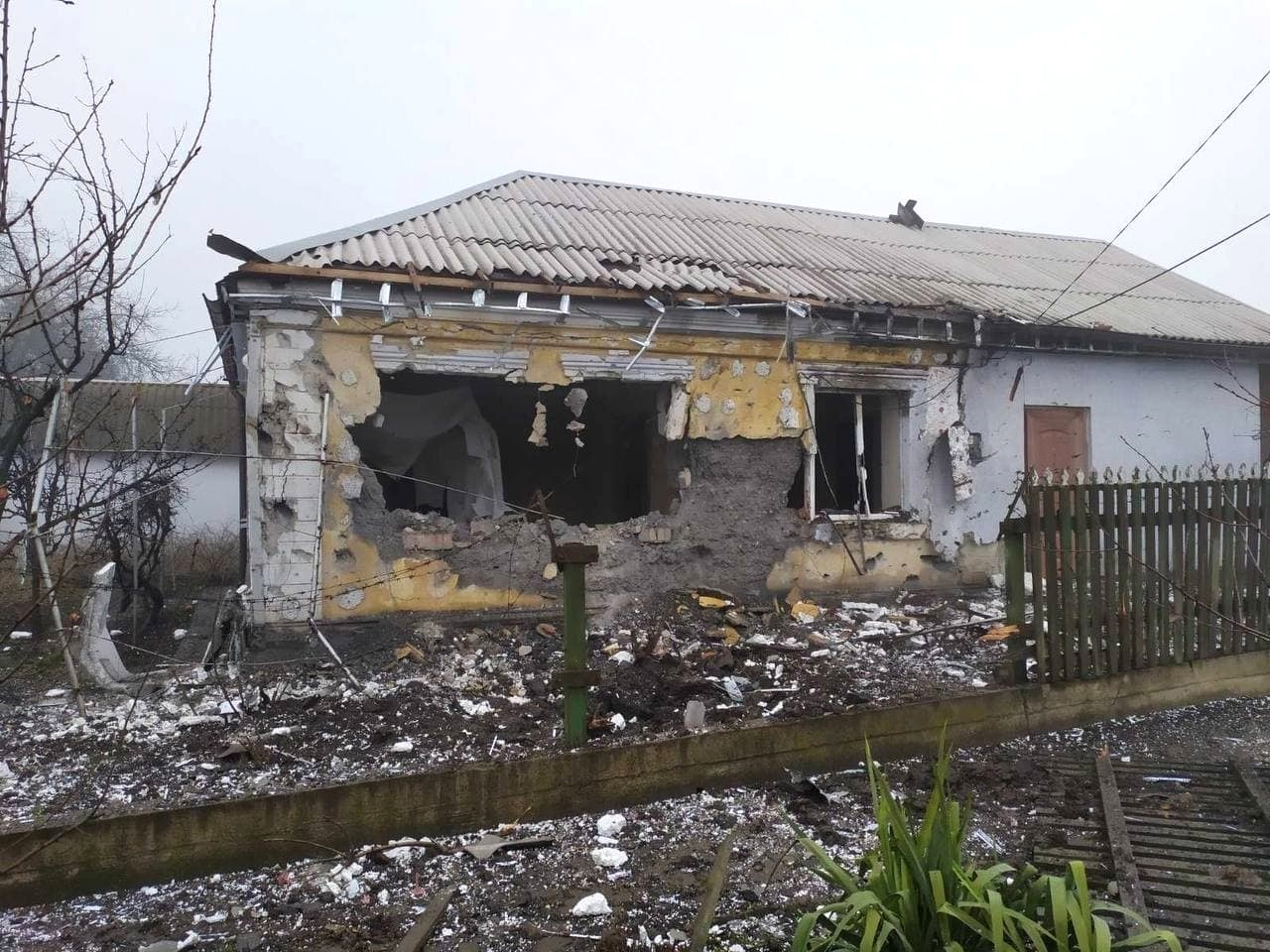
Russian bombing of Mariupol, 3 March 2022

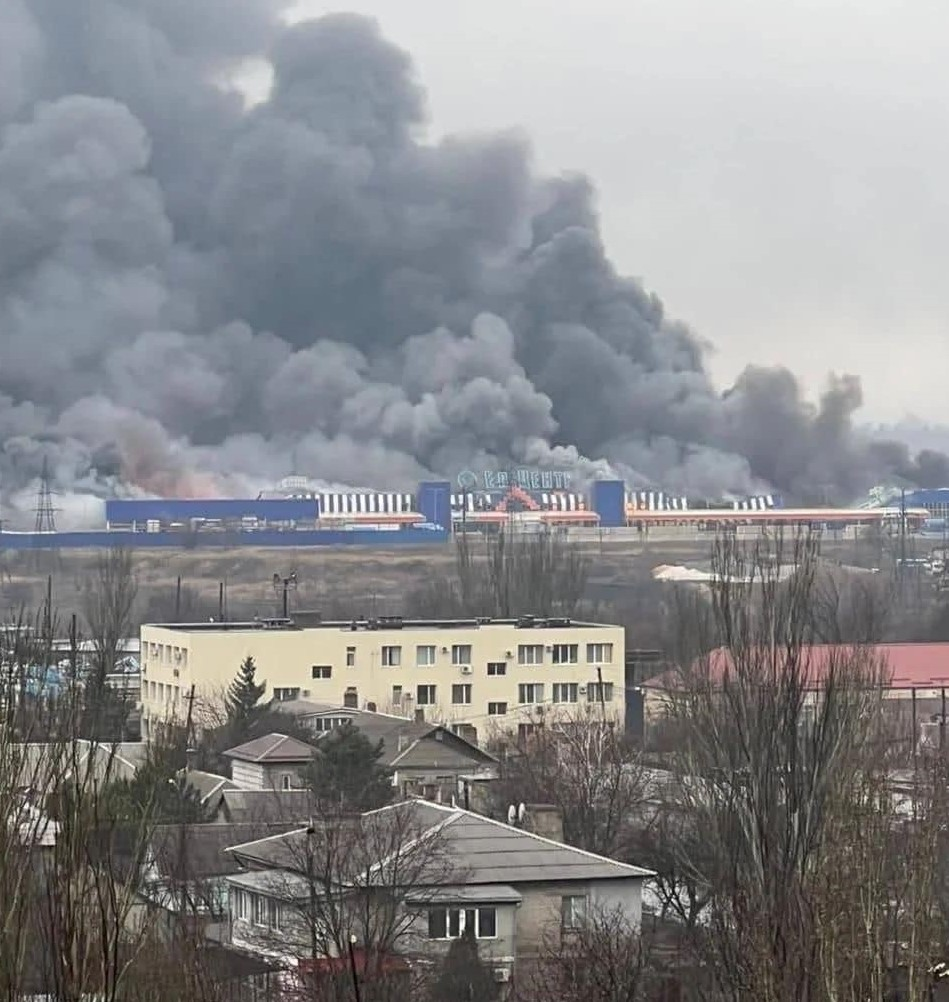
Smoke from many buildings amid massive Russian bombing in Mariupol, 3 March 2022

Later on 2 March, Russian artillery targeted a densely populated neighbourhood of Mariupol, shelling it for nearly 15 hours. The neighbourhood was massively damaged as a result, with deputy mayor Sergiy Orlov reporting that "at least hundreds of people are dead".

On the morning of 3 March, the city was shelled again by Russian troops. Eduard Basurin, the spokesman for the DPR militia, formally called on the besieged Ukrainian forces in Mariupol to surrender or face "targeted strikes". Russian Ministry of Defense spokesman Igor Konashenkov reported that DPR forces had tightened the siege, and that three nearby settlements had been captured: Sartana, Vynohradne, and Vodiane.

On 4 March, Boychenko stated that the city's supplies were running out, and called for a humanitarian evacuation corridor and Ukrainian military reinforcements. He also stated that Russian BM-21 Grads were shelling the city's hospitals and that Mariupol residents no longer had heat, running water, or electricity. Later that day, a temporary ceasefire was proposed for the Mariupol region to allow citizens to evacuate.

On 5 March, the Ukrainian government announced its desire to evacuate 200,000 civilians from Mariupol. The International Committee of the Red Cross (ICRC) announced that it would act as a guarantor for a new ceasefire to allow for this evacuation. The Red Cross described the situation as "extremely dire". After three days of shelling, a ceasefire was announced to be in effect from 11:00 to 16:00. Civilians began to evacuate from Mariupol along a humanitarian corridor to the city of Zaporizhzhia. As civilians entered the evacuation corridor, Russian forces continued shelling the city, forcing evacuees to turn back.

Ukrainian authorities later reported that Russian forces had failed to observe the ceasefire and continued to shell the city. Russian officials accused Ukrainian forces of not allowing civilians to evacuate towards Russia. The DPR reported that only 17 civilians had been evacuated from Mariupol.

On 6 March, the Red Cross announced that a second attempt to evacuate civilians from Mariupol had again failed. Anton Herashchenko, a Ukrainian official, said the second attempt at a humanitarian corridor for civilians in Mariupol ended with a Russian bombardment. The Red Cross reported "devastating scenes of human suffering" in Mariupol. Later in the morning, Inna Sovsun, a Ukrainian member of parliament, stated that the fuel pipeline that supplies Mariupol was damaged by Russian forces, leaving more than 700,000 people without heat, and suggested that people might freeze to death, as the temperature at the time often fell below 0 °C (32 °F). The bombardment also hit the city's last functioning cellular tower.

On 7 March, the ICRC Director of Operations stated that humanitarian corridor agreements had only been made in principle, without the precision required for implementation, needing routes, times and whether goods could be brought in to be agreed. The ICRC team found that one of the proposed corridor roads was mined. The ICRC was facilitating talks between Russian and Ukrainian forces.

On 8 March, another attempt to evacuate civilians was made, but the Ukrainian government accused Russia of violating the ceasefire again by bombing the evacuation corridor.

On 9 March, the Associated Press reported that scores of Ukrainian civilians and soldiers were being buried by city workers in a mass grave at one of the city's cemeteries. Russian shelling had hit the cemetery the previous day, interrupting the burials and damaging a wall. Later, another attempted ceasefire failed after Orlov reported that Russian soldiers had opened fire on construction workers and evacuation points. Orlov described the city's supply shortage as so severe that residents were melting snow to get water. Later that day, the Mariupol City Council issued a statement that a Russian airstrike had struck and destroyed a maternity ward and children's hospital. Ukrainian officials stated that three civilians were killed and at least 17 wounded.

== Urban advances ==
=== Russian push into the city ===
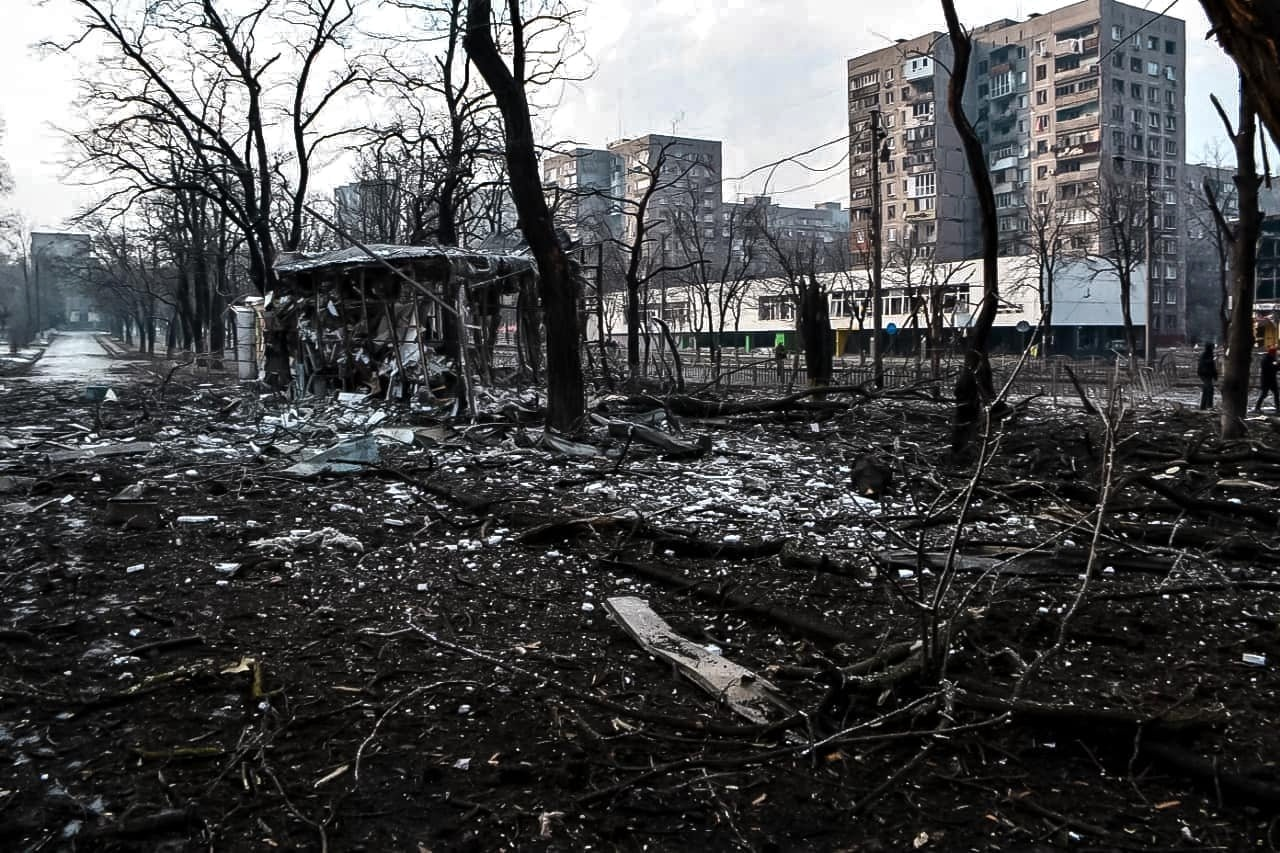
The streets in Mariupol, 12 March 2022

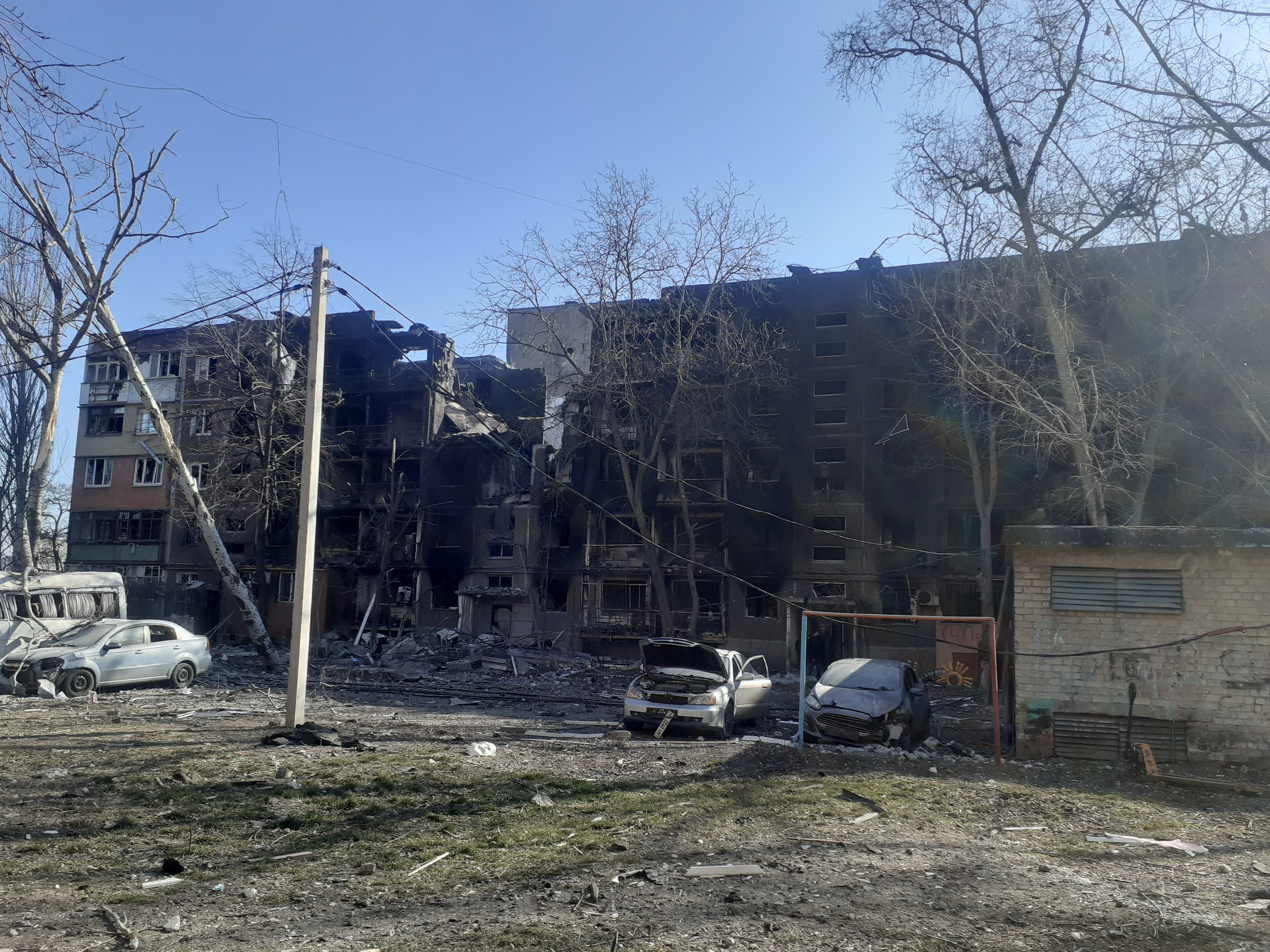
A damaged apartment building, 16 March 2022

Ukraine's military stated on 12 March that Russian forces had captured the eastern outskirts of Mariupol. Later, a vehicle convoy of 82 ethnic Greeks was able to leave the city via a humanitarian corridor.

On 13 March, Boychenko stated that Russian forces had bombed the city at least 22 times in the previous 24 hours, with a hundred bombs, and added that the last food and water reserves in the city were being depleted. The Ukrainian Ministry of Internal Affairs said that the National Guard of Ukraine had damaged several Russian armoured vehicles with artillery strikes during the day. İsmail Hacıoğlu, the head of the local Sultan Suleiman Mosque, stated that 86 Turkish citizens in the city were awaiting evacuation by the Turkish government.

More than 160 cars were able to leave the city on 14 March at 13:00 local time, the first evacuation allowed during the siege. The Russian Ministry of Defense stated that 450 tonnes of humanitarian aid had been brought to the city after Russian forces captured the outskirts. Ukrainian military officials were later said to have killed 150 Russian soldiers and destroyed 10 Russian vehicles.

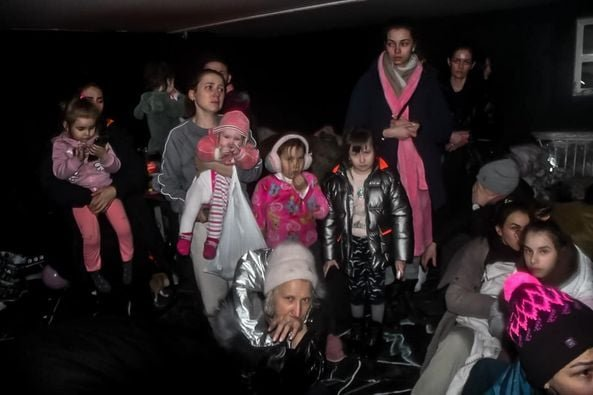
Refugee civilians in Mariupol, 12 March 2022

On the same day, Ramzan Kadyrov, the head of Chechnya, stated that Chechen soldiers were participating in the siege and had briefly entered Mariupol before retreating. Kadyrov also stated that Adam Delimkhanov, a close ally and member of the State Duma, was the commander of Chechen forces in Mariupol. The funeral for Captain Alexey Glushchak of the GRU was held in Tyumen, and it was revealed he died near Mariupol, likely in the early stages of the siege.

On 15 March, around 4,000 vehicles with about 20,000 civilians were able to leave the city.

Ukrainian government official Anton Herashchenko said that Russian Major General Oleg Mityaev, commander of the 150th Motorized Rifle Division, was killed when Russian forces tried to storm the city. The Donetsk Regional Drama Theatre, sheltering hundreds of civilians, was hit by a Russian airstrike on 16 March and destroyed. Pavlo Kyrylenko, the governor of Donetsk Oblast, later stated that Russian forces had also targeted the Neptune swimming pool.

On 18 March, DPR forces said they had captured the Mariupol airport from Ukrainian forces. Clashes later reached the city centre, according to the mayor and on 19 March, Russian and Ukrainian forces began fighting at the Azovstal steel plant. On the same day, President Volodymyr Zelenskyy awarded Colonel Volodymyr Baranyuk and Major Denys Prokopenko, leaders of the defence in Mariupol, the honour of Hero of Ukraine, the country's highest military award. During this time, while attempting to transport the killed and wounded to the hospital at Azovstal, Major Mykyta Nadtochii, commander of the Azov Regiment's second battalion, was wounded in a Russian airstrike.

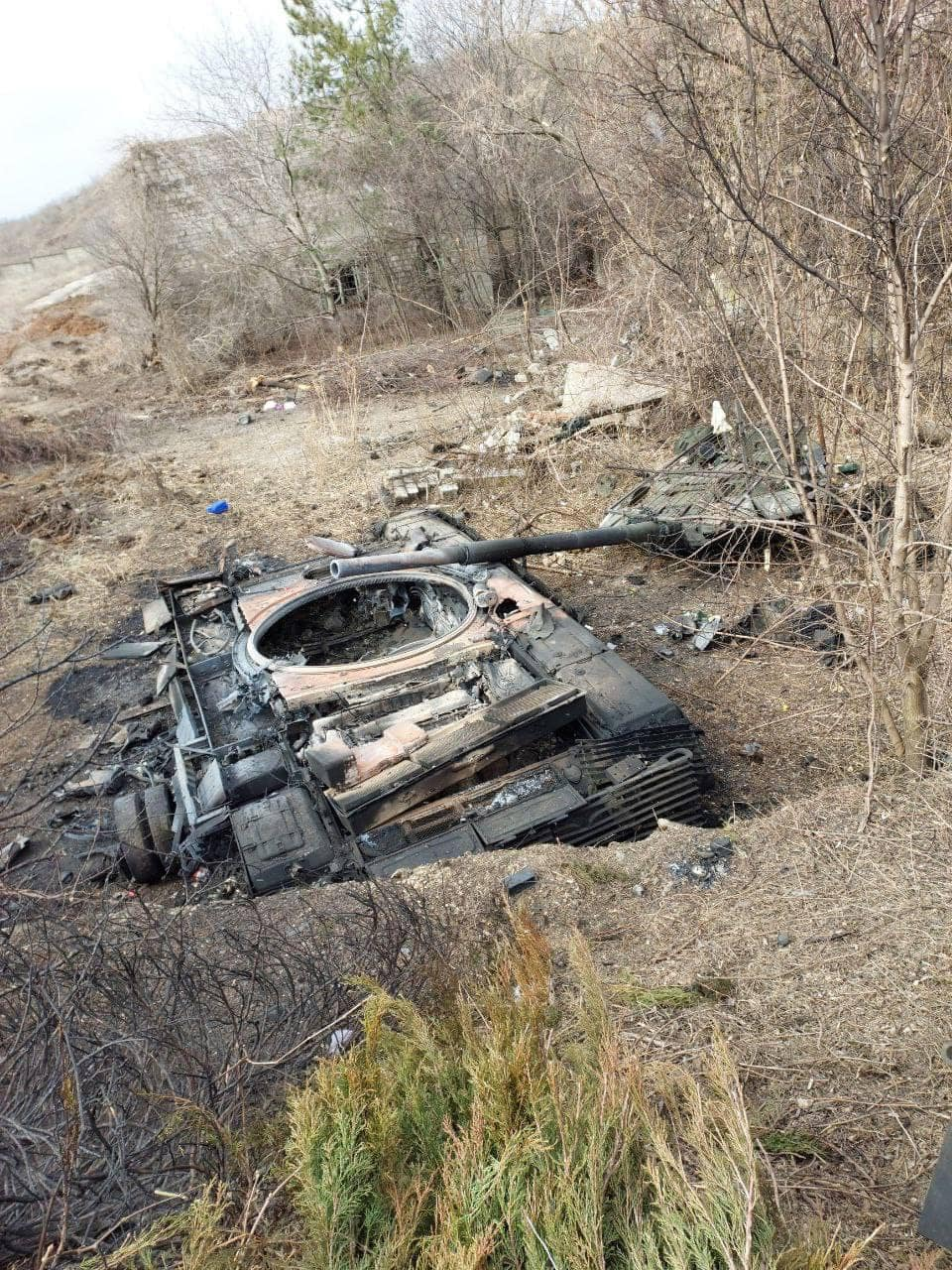
Russian tank destroyed by Ukrainian troops in Mariupol

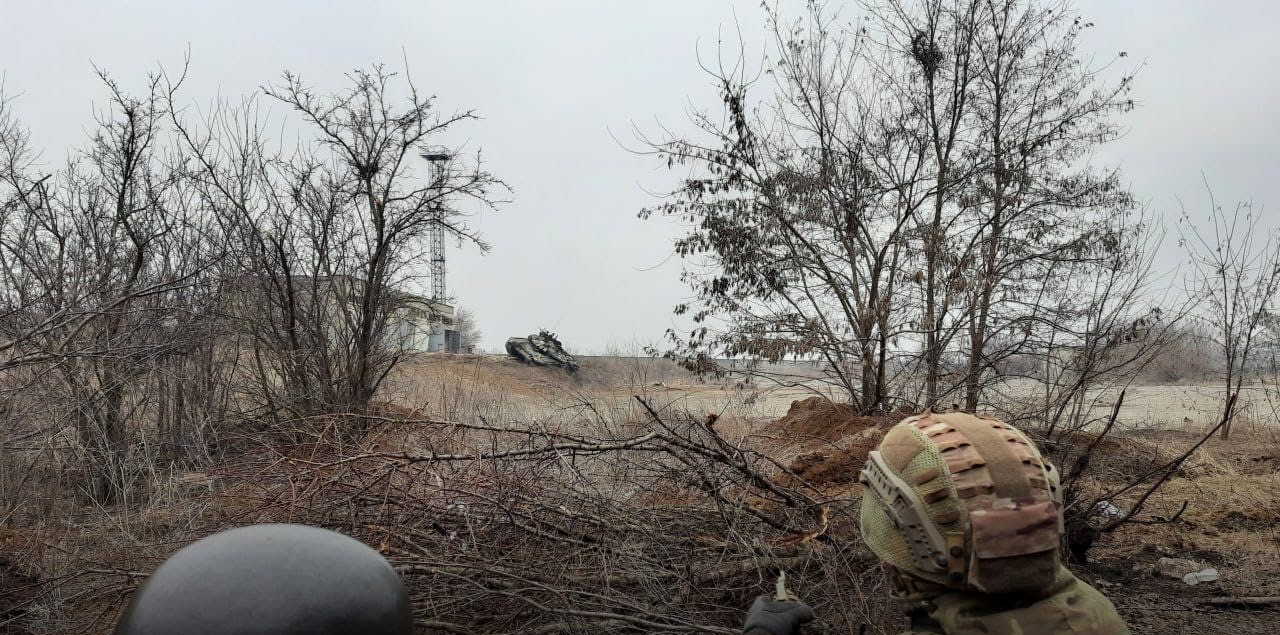
Ukrainian soldiers attack a Russian tank in Mariupol

On 20 March, the city council of Mariupol claimed Russian forces had forcefully deported "several thousand" people to camps and remote cities in Russia over the past week. Russia denied the accusation. The same day, an art school building, which had sheltered some 400 people, was destroyed in a Russian bombing. The Mariupol City Council made the announcement through the instant messaging service Telegram, highlighting that many of those sheltering in the school were women, children and elderly. However, Petro Andryushchenko, an advisor to the Mayor of Mariupol, raised the concern that there was no exact number on how many people were using the school as a refuge. No information on casualties was immediately available.

An order by Russia's Ministry of Defence to surrender, lay down arms and evacuate the city was submitted on 20 March, requesting a written response by 02:00 UTC the next day. The ultimatum was rejected by the Ukrainian government and the mayor of Mariupol. By this point, one of the Ukrainian battalion commanders in the city described "bombs falling every 10 minutes".

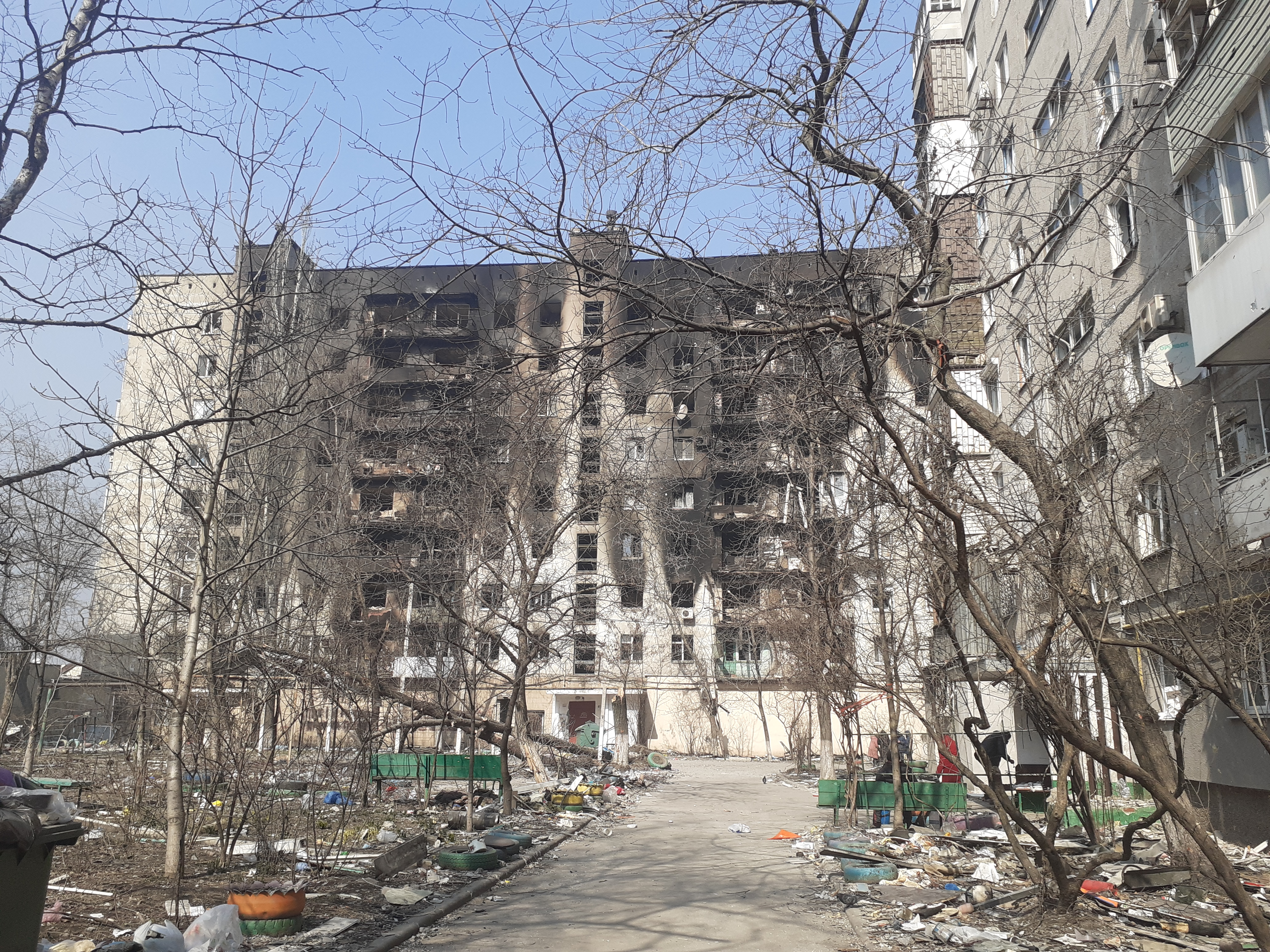
Shelled apartment building in Mariupol, 23 March 2022

On 21 March, the first helicopter evacuation from Azovstal took place as eight or nine seriously wounded soldiers were evacuated, including the wounded Major Nadtochii. Two Ukrainian Mil Mi-8 helicopters flew into Azovstal as part of "Operation Air Corridor", carrying a special forces team with crates of Stinger and Javelin missiles, as well as a satellite internet system. "Operation Air Corridor" lasted until 7 April, when one helicopter was shot down, followed by the shooting down of a second helicopter that was sent as part of rescue efforts to search for survivors of the first downing. The four special forces members on board the second helicopter were killed, along with the helicopter's crew. Ukraine claimed 85 seriously wounded soldiers were evacuated as part of "Operation Air Corridor" during seven missions to the Azovstal plant to resupply or deliver reinforcements using some 16 Mi-8s, in pairs or fours, two of which were shot down, along with the rescue helicopter, according to Major General Kyrylo Budanov.

In contrast, Ukrainian president Zelenskyy stated 90 per cent of helicopter pilots sent to Mariupol during the course of the siege to resupply Ukrainian forces and evacuate the wounded were lost due to Russian air defences. According to Russia, one Ukrainian Mil Mi-8 helicopter was shot down on 28 March, as it was heading to Mariupol to evacuate the leaders of the Azov Regiment. Russia reported its forces shot down two more Ukrainian Mi-8s on 5 April, as they were once again attempting to evacuate Azov commanders. The Times later reported, after interviewing Ukrainian participants, that from 21 March to 11 May 15 helicopters and 45 aircrew made nearly 30 attempted rescue missions delivering ammunition, equipment, medicine and evacuating wounded, with six flights being successful and three helicopters shot down with 23 killed in one crash.

On 23 March, local authorities, including the mayor, left the city due to the deteriorating situation. The following day, Russian forces entered central Mariupol, seizing the Orthodox Church of the Intercession of the Mother of God. The city administration alleged that Russians were trying to demoralize residents by publicly shouting claims of Russian victories, including statements that Odesa had been captured.

Vadym Boychenko said on 27 March that while Mariupol was still under Ukrainian control, Russian forces had entered deep into the city and that the city's population needed a "complete evacuation". By this point, Ukrainian soldiers had run out of food and clean drinking water, and an analyst believed that Ukrainian forces would not be able to fight on beyond a few days. However, Ukrainian officers refused to evacuate from the city, as they did not want to abandon their wounded and dead soldiers and civilians. The "Club 8bit" computer museum was destroyed.

On 28 March, Mayor Vadym Boychenko said "we are in the hands of the occupiers today" in a televised interview, and a spokesman for the Mariupol mayor's office announced that "nearly 5,000 people" had been killed in the city since the start of the siege. The Ukrainian government estimated that "from 20,000 to 30,000" Mariupol residents had been forcibly sent to camps in Russia under Russian military control. During the day, Russian forces seized the administrative building in the northern Kalmiuskyi District and the military headquarters of the Azov Regiment. The next day, Russian forces were reported to have likely divided Ukrainian troops in the city into two and possibly even three pockets.

On 2 April, Russian forces captured the SBU building in central Mariupol, after which there was no more reported fighting in the area. On 4 April, one Ukrainian battalion surrendered, with Russian officials stating two days later they captured 267 Ukrainian marines from the 503rd Battalion of the Ukrainian Naval Forces. Due to the surrender, the lines between the Ukrainian 36th Separate Marine Brigade and the Azov Regiment had been broken. On 7 April, the DPR announced central Mariupol had been cleared of Ukrainian forces.

Meanwhile, Russian troops started an advance from the southwest on 1 April, leaving the Ukrainian military in partial control of the area around the port in the southwest of Mariupol by 7 April. On 4 April, a Russian Navy missile hit a Malta-based Dominica-flagged cargo ship, setting it on fire. On 7 April, Russian forces captured a bridge leading to the Azovstal steel plant. The following day, Russian troops seized the southern part of Mariupol's port.

On 10 April, Russian forces captured the fishing port, separating Ukrainian troops in the port from those in the Azovstal steel plant into two pockets, while a possible third pocket was centred on the Illich steel plant to the north. The next day, DPR forces claimed to have captured 80% of Mariupol. Local Ukrainian forces expected the city to fall soon, since they were running out of ammunition, and analysts at the Institute for the Study of War believed that Mariupol would fall within a week.

=== Final pockets of resistance ===
On 11 April, Russian media reported that 160 Ukrainian servicemen from the 36th Separate Marine Brigade were captured with their equipment.

During the night between 11 and 12 April, Baranyuk led the 36th Separate Marine Brigade in an attempt to break out of the Russian encirclement at the Illich steel plant to the north. After being spotted they broke into smaller groups, some managing to link up with fighters of the Azov Regiment at the Azovstal plant to the southeast. Many Ukrainian servicemen were killed or captured during the break-out. The fate of Baranyuk initially remained unknown. Later, the DPR claimed that they had identified the body of Baranyuk after their special forces blocked the Ukrainian break-out. However, on 8 May, Baranyuk appeared alive in an interview with RT, along with the 36th Brigade's Chief of Staff Dmytro Kormiankov. They were reported to have been captured during the break-out attempt.

Around the same time at 11 April, a 16-man detachment from a battalion of tankers of the 17th Tank Brigade, which were doing operations supporting the 36th Brigade, did not follow Baranyuk's plan and instead broke through the siege. They used two tanks, anti-aircraft guns and cars for transport, and after breaking out they proceeded on foot for 175 km until reaching friendly Ukrainian positions. For leading his men to safety, the unit's commander, Lieutenant Colonel Oleg Grudzevych, was awarded a Hero of Ukraine medal.

On 12 April, Aiden Aslin, a British man fighting with the Ukrainian Marines, reported that his unit was forced to surrender since they had run out of ammunition, food and other supplies. Subsequently, in the evening, Russia stated that 1,026 marines of the 36th Separate Marine Brigade had surrendered at the Illich steel plant, including 162 officers and 400 wounded fighters. Later, Russia said it captured an additional 134 Ukrainian servicemen, bringing the total number of prisoners to 1,160. Ukraine confirmed nearly 1,000 Marines had been captured, including wounded and those who remained at the Illich plant. On 13 April, Russian forces secured the Illich plant, reducing the number of pockets in Mariupol to two, while Russia also announced it had taken full control of Mariupol's commercial port, which was confirmed three days later. The commander of the Azov Regiment, Prokopenko, criticised the servicemen that had surrendered, while praising those that managed to link up with his unit. Prokopenko, as well as Ukrainian intelligence officer Illia Samoilenko, also blamed Baranyuk for the large losses inflicted on Ukrainian forces, stating his actions were uncoordinated. According to Prokopenko, Baranyuk's break-out attempt was made without warning to other units and the direction of attack was not previously agreed upon, while Samoilenko called Baranyuk a "coward", stating he tried to flee the city, "taking with him people, tanks and ammunition".

Ukrainian military expert Oleg Zhdanov claimed that by this point the Russian 810th Guards Naval Infantry Brigade, originally sent from Feodosia, had suffered extremely heavy losses during the siege, to the extent of being "destroyed twice."

== Resistance in the Azovstal steel plant ==
=== Withdrawal to Azovstal ===
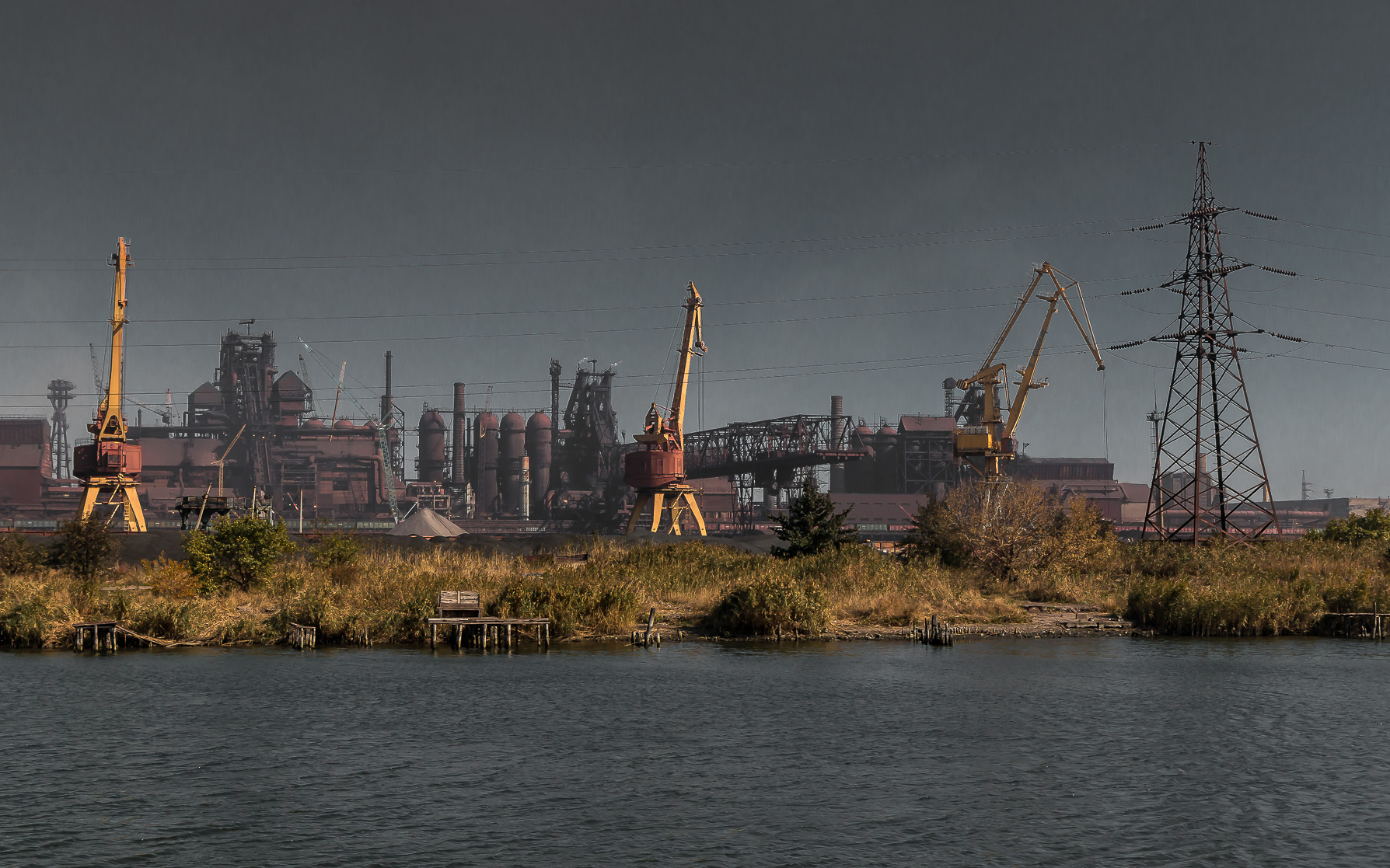
The Azovstal steel plant in 2014

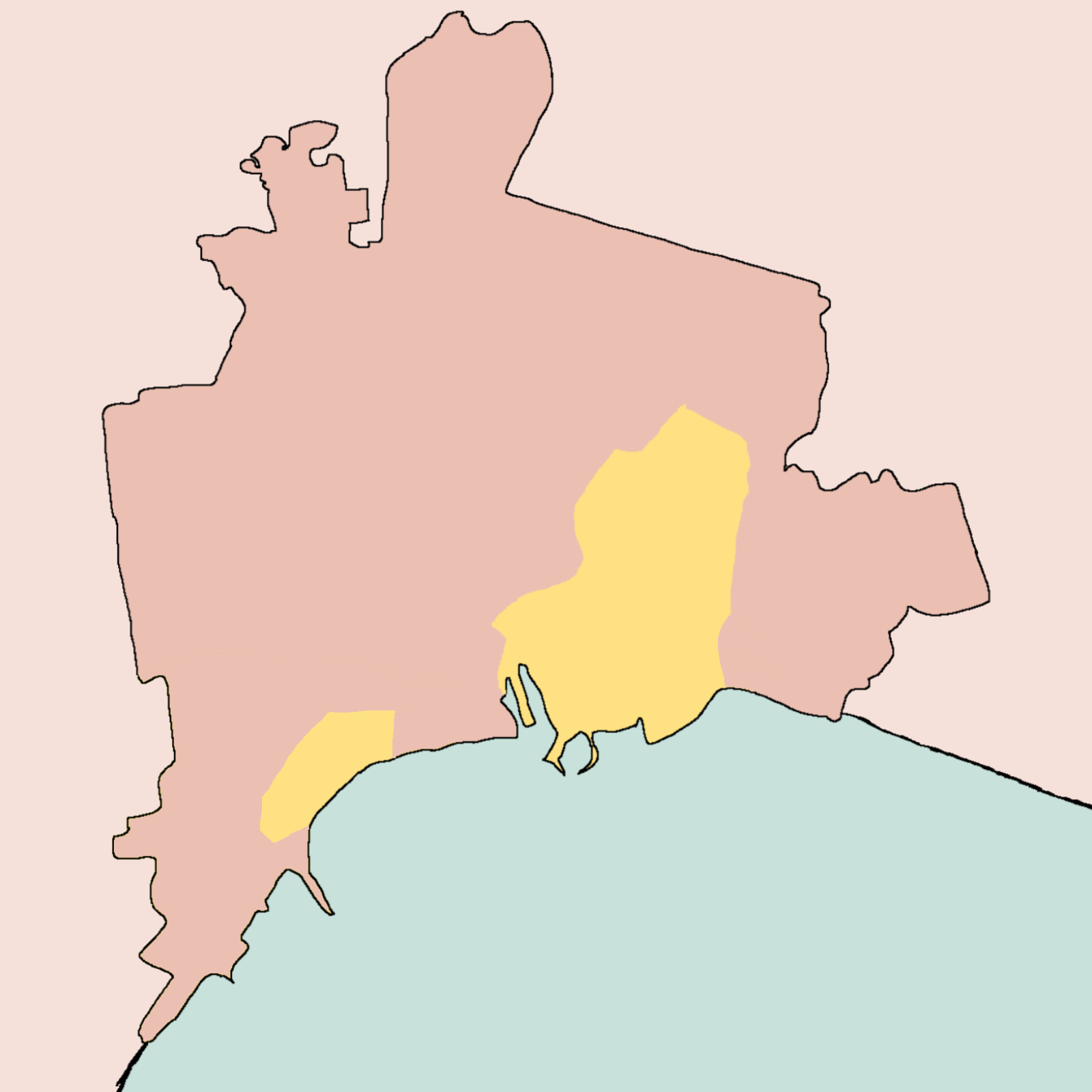
The Siege of Mariupol on 15 April 2022

On 15 April, a Ukrainian military commander issued a plea for military reinforcements to come and "break the siege" of Mariupol. He also said that "the situation is critical and the fighting is fierce" but that sending reinforcements and breaking the siege "can be done and it must be done as soon as possible". On the same day, Ukrainian Defence Ministry spokesman Oleksandr Motuzianyk reported Russia started using Tu-22M3 long-range bombers to strike targets in Mariupol. The Azovstal iron and steel works, the heart of one of the remaining pockets of resistance, was well-defended and described as a "fortress within a city", as the steel plant was an enormous complex that made locating the Ukrainian forces difficult and had workshops that were difficult to destroy from the air. Additionally, the complex contained a system of underground tunnels, which would make clearing the entire complex challenging. During the day, Russian forces captured the base of the Ukrainian National Guard's 12th Operational Brigade (Ukraine), in western Mariupol.

On 16 April, DPR troops seized a police station near Mariupol's beach and Russian forces were confirmed to have seized the Vessel Traffic Control Center at the port. Several days after the port was captured, on 20 April, a Ukrainian Marine officer claimed Marine and Azov forces from the Azovstal plant conducted an evacuation operation of around 500 members of the Ukrainian Border Guard and National Police from the port, as they were running out of ammunition. According to the officer, the Ukrainian forces from the Azovstal pocket made an armoured breakthrough to the port and provided covering fire, as the 500 besieged soldiers retreated to the Azovstal plant. Subsequently, Russia announced all urban areas of the city had been cleared, claiming that Ukrainian forces only remained at the Azovstal Steel Plant. However, fighting was reported to be continuing near Flotskaya street in the western Primorsky District.

On 18 April, it was estimated that 95% of the city had been destroyed in the fighting. Ukrainian soldiers ignored a Russian ultimatum to surrender, deciding to fight to the end. Russia threatened to "destroy" those who continued to fight on. A military expert estimated that there could still be 500 to 800 Ukrainian soldiers holding out within the city, while Russian officials estimated that 2,500 Ukrainian soldiers and 400 foreign volunteers were holding out within the Azovstal plant.

=== Siege of Azovstal ===
The military situation in Mariupol on 16 May 2022, shortly before the city fell. Controlled by Russia Controlled by Ukraine

On 20 April, Russian and DPR forces made small advances on the outskirts of the Azovstal plant. That same day, Ukraine accused Russia of bombing a hospital sheltering 300 people. Serhiy Taruta, the former governor of the Donetsk region and a Mariupol native, said 300 people, including wounded troops and civilians with children, were sheltered at the hospital. On 21 April, Russian President Vladimir Putin ordered Russian troops not to storm the Azovstal steel plant, but to blockade it instead until the Ukrainian forces there ran out of supplies. He also reported that "The completion of combat work to liberate Mariupol is a success", while a Ukrainian official rebutted Putin's comments, saying that Russia's choice of implementing a blockade over storming the steel plant meant that Russia had admitted their inability to physically capture Mariupol. General Sir Richard Barrons, former commander of the United Kingdom's Joint Forces Command, assessed that the battle for the plant was no longer "really relevant" in regard to the control of the city and its roads, since Russia and Crimea were now connected. In his opinion, defeating Ukrainian forces at the plant would have been "really difficult" for Russian troops without an "enormous cost to both sides". Despite the ordered blockade, Russian forces advanced within 20 metres (66 ft) of some of the Ukrainian positions.

On 22 April, the western Primorsky District was thought to be cleared by Russian forces, with no more reports of fighting, with all of the remaining Ukrainian forces surrounded in the Azovstal Steel Plant. Hundreds of civilians had also taken refuge at the plant. On 23 April, according to Ukraine, airstrikes and an apparent ground assault recommenced on the Azovstal steel works. An advisor to the Ukrainian President said: "The enemy is trying to strangle the final resistance of the defenders of Mariupol in the Azovstal area". However, this could not be independently confirmed. Ukrainian security chief Oleksiy Danilov claimed that at night, a helicopter had resupplied Azovstal. On the same day, it was reported that Russia was redeploying forces from Mariupol to other fronts in eastern Ukraine, with Russia reportedly redeploying 12 units from Mariupol. On the next day, Russian forces continued bombing Ukrainian positions in the Azovstal Steel Plant, with reports that Russian forces might have been planning a renewed assault on the facility. Meanwhile, Ukrainian supplies of ammunition were dwindling, while food and water were running dangerously low. During the night of 27 to 28 April, the heaviest airstrikes yet were reportedly conducted against Azovstal, with more than 50 strikes by Tu-22M3, Su-25s and Su-24s aircraft hitting the facility, according to Ukraine. Ukraine claimed a military field hospital was hit, with the number of wounded increasing from 170 before the strike to more than 600 after the bombing.

=== Evacuation of civilians ===
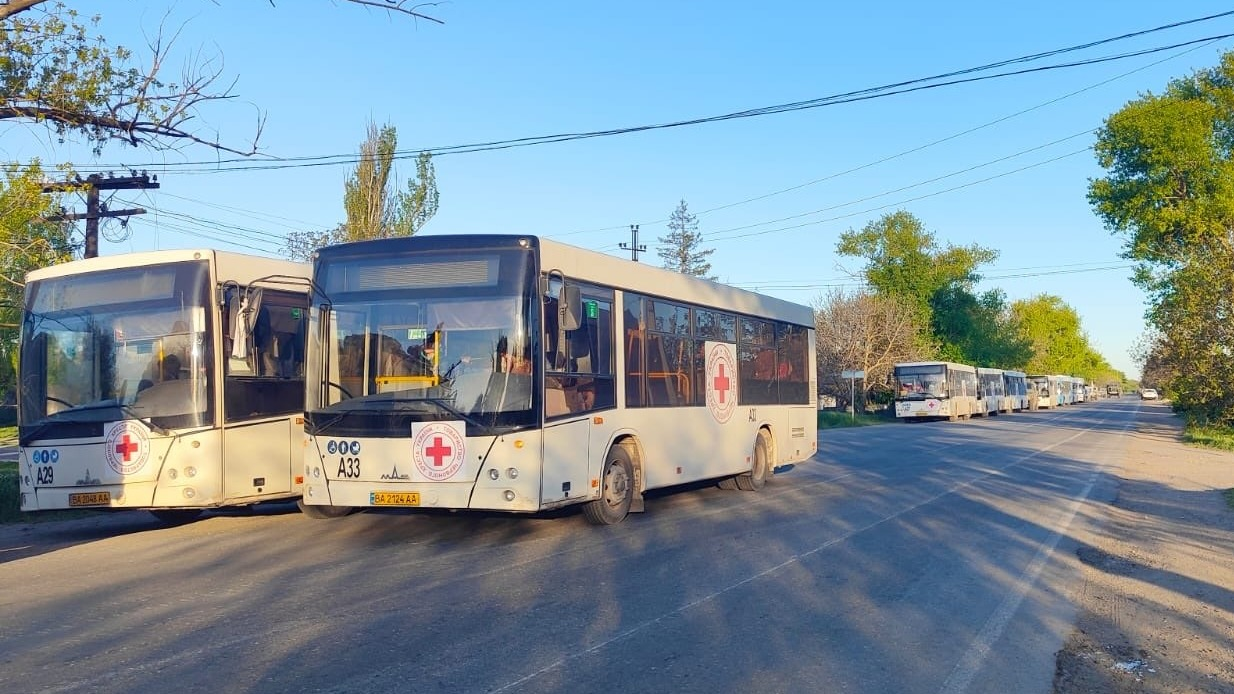
ICRC buses preparing for an evacuation convoy on 8 May 2022 to Zaporizhzhia

On 30 April, the United Nations and the International Committee of the Red Cross (ICRC) started to run evacuations through a humanitarian corridor. This corridor was made after a trip by Secretary-General of the United Nations António Guterres to Moscow the previous week, where he personally brokered a deal. On 30 April 20 civilians had left the Azovstal steel plant, while Russian media claimed a number of 25. Talks were underway to try and release the remaining 1,000 or so civilians. At least two of the wives of members of the Azov Regiment called for a concurrent evacuation of the about 2,000 forces that would be left behind after the civilian evacuation, highlighting concerns of treatment as POWs by the Russians and lack of medical and food supplies.

On 2 May, about 100 civilians were reported to have been evacuated. Russian aircraft, according to the US Department of Defense, were using dumb bombs in Mariupol. Russian ground forces were also reported to be pulling out of the city, possibly to reinforce their positions elsewhere in the Donbas, where Russia was carrying out a large-scale offensive. According to one US DOD official: "Largely the efforts around Mariupol for the Russians are now in the realm of airstrikes". On 3 May, the Russian forces in Mariupol restarted their attacks on Azovstal. They began an assault on the steel plant in what have been called "difficult bloody battles". The following day it was reported the Russians had broken into the plant. Ukrainian politician Davyd Arakhamia said: "Attempts to storm the plant continue for the second day. Russian troops are already on the territory of Azovstal." On 5 May, some 300 civilians were allowed to leave due to Russia opening humanitarian corridors. These corridors ran from 8 am to 6 pm. Ukrainian forces blamed Russian success on an electrician who gave Russian forces information about the underground tunnel network, claiming: "Yesterday, the Russians started storming these tunnels, using the information they received from the betrayer."

On 5 May, The Telegraph reported that Russia had intensified its bombing of the steel factory bunkers by using thermobaric bombs to increase the devastation of deployed firepower against the remaining Ukrainian soldiers who had lost all contact with the Kyiv government; in his last communications, Zelenskyy had authorised the commander of the besieged steel factory to surrender as necessary under the pressure of increased Russian attacks.

On 6 May, some 500 civilians, in total, had been evacuated according to the United Nations. The Azov Regiment reported one fighter killed and six wounded while helping evacuate civilians. On 7 May, the Ukrainian government announced that all of the remaining women, children and elderly who had been inside the Azovstal steel plant had been evacuated.

=== Ukrainian surrender ===
Bombardment of Azovstal, May 2022

On 8 May, the commander of the 36th Separate Marine Brigade, Serhiy Volynskyi, asked "that a higher power find a way to figure out our rescue". As to their current conditions, "It feels like I've landed in a hellish reality show in which us soldiers fight for our lives and the whole world watches this interesting episode. Pain, suffering, hunger, misery, tears, fears, death. It's all real." President Zelenskyy promised "we are working on evacuating our military".

On 9 May, the Donetsk People's Republic held a Victory Day parade in Mariupol. The leader of the Republic, Denis Pushilin participated in the event. At the same time, a meeting took place near Mariupol involving Russian military representatives and Ukrainian commanders from Azovstal, including Major Prokopenko, who were brought to the meeting place by Russian armoured vehicles from Azovstal. During the meeting, the terms of the Ukrainians' surrender were agreed upon.

On 10 May, Ukrainian authorities reported that over 1,000 Ukrainian soldiers, hundreds of them wounded, remained trapped inside the Azovstal steelworks.

The Institute for the Study of War noted the lack of a Russian ground offensive on 12 May, but noted that Russian forces had likely secured the M14 highway the following day.

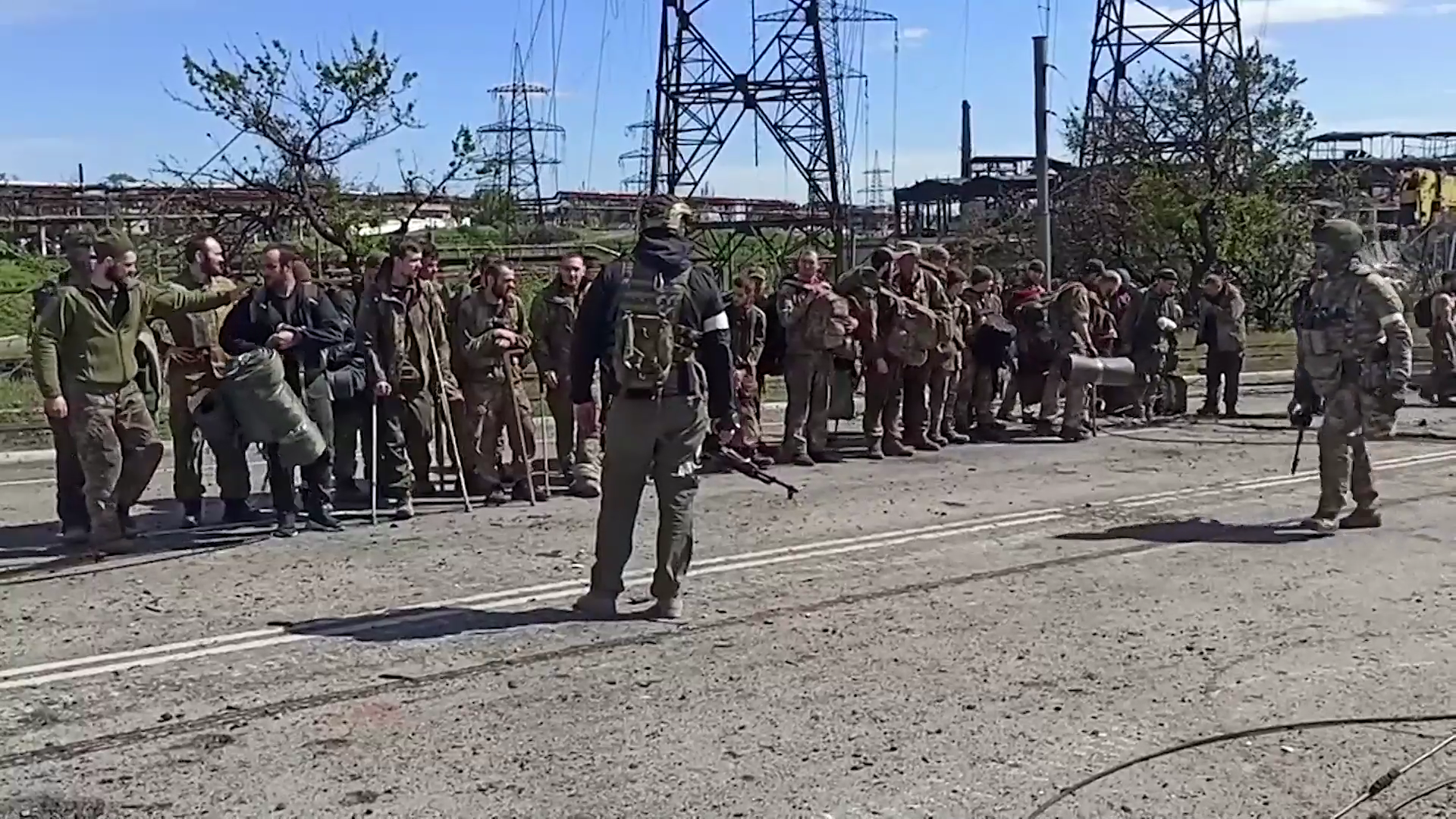
Russian soldiers with Ukrainian prisoners after the fall of Azovstal, May 2022

On 16 May, Alexander Khodakovsky, commander of a DPR brigade stationed near Azovstal, stated that a group of nine soldiers had come out of the plant to negotiate under a white flag. On the same day, the Ukrainian General staff announced that the Mariupol garrison had "fulfilled its combat mission" and that "evacuation" from the Azovstal steel plant had begun. The military said that 264 service members, 53 of them seriously wounded, had been taken by bus to areas controlled by Russian forces. A social media post was released by Azov Regiment commander Denys Prokopenko stating: "In order to save lives, the entire Mariupol garrison is implementing the approved decision of the Supreme Military Command and hopes for the support of the Ukrainian people." Wounded Ukrainian soldiers from the Azovstal plant were taken to the DPR-controlled town of Novoazovsk for treatment. The evacuation of wounded troops was followed in the subsequent days by the surrender of the remainder of the garrison. Ukrainian Deputy Defence Minister Hanna Maliar said: "Thanks to the defenders of Mariupol, Ukraine gained critically important time to form reserves and regroup forces and receive help from partners. And they fulfilled all their tasks. But it is impossible to unblock Azovstal by military means."

Russia press secretary Dmitry Peskov said Russian President Vladimir Putin had guaranteed that the fighters who surrendered would be treated "in accordance with international standards" while President Zelenskyy said in an address that "the work of bringing the boys home continues, and this work needs delicacy – and time". Some prominent Russian lawmakers called on the government to deny prisoner exchanges for members of the Azov Regiment. The ICRC registered the surrendered troops as prisoners of war at the request of both sides, collecting information to contact their families.

On 18 May, Russian artillery and aircraft bombed once again Azovstal's remaining defenders. The DPR leadership claimed that the local high-ranking Ukrainian commanders had not yet surrendered. According to Russian sources, the last defenders surrendered on 20 May, among them Lieutenant Colonel Prokopenko, Major Volynskyi and Captain Svyatoslav Palamar, deputy commander of the Azov Regiment. The Russian Ministry of Defense claimed that altogether 2,439 prisoners had been taken at Azovstal between 16 and 20 May, and that the steel plant was now under control of Russian and DPR forces.

== Aftermath ==
=== Demolition of buildings and Russification of the city ===
On 18 May, Head of the DPR Denis Pushilin announced Azovstal would be demolished by the Donetsk People's Republic, and Mariupol would be turned into a resort city. On 26 May, Russia reopened the Port of Mariupol to commercial vessels following mine removal.

In the months after taking control of the city, Russian authorities had many damaged buildings torn down, sometimes even turning out the remaining residents. Some new houses were also built. Associated Press describes this ongoing process as an effort to "eradicat[e] all vestiges of Ukraine" and to cover up "the evidence of war crimes". Local schools started using the Russian curriculum, the television and radio broadcast in Russian and many street names were replaced by their Soviet-era ones.

=== Last Ukrainian holdouts and prisoners of war ===
Russian Telegram bloggers shared a video, reportedly showing Russian soldiers attacking some remaining Ukrainian holdouts at Azovstal on 22 May. Denis Pushilin claimed that some Ukrainian holdouts had been discovered and captured in the area of the Azovstal plant.

In an explosion at Olenivka prison on 29 July 2022, 53 Ukrainian prisoners of war from Mariupol were killed and 75 wounded. Both Ukrainian and Russian authorities accused each other of the attack on the prison. In a 2023 report from the United Nations, irregularities were noted among the behaviour of the guards at the prison, such as the relocation of the guard post to a position further away from the prisoners one day before the explosion, and the guards suddenly wearing body armour and helmets while on duty, also starting the day before the explosion. However, definitive proof of fault could not be established.

On 21 September 2022, 215 Ukrainian prisoners of war from Mariupol were released in a prisoner swap. Under the agreement, Ukrainian Azov Regiment Commander Denys Prokopenko and four other top Ukrainian commanders from the Azovstal siege will be required to stay in Turkey until the end of the war. On 8 July 2023, Zelenskyy announced that the five Ukrainian commanders had been brought back to Ukraine from Turkey.

=== City government's role ===
Mariupol's Mayor Vadym Boychenko was forced to leave Mariupol on 27 February at the insistence of Ukrainian special services who said that Russian sabotage groups wanted to capture him.

First Deputy Mayor Mykhailo Kohut remained in Mariupol, on Boychenko's behalf, who was responsible for the direction of communal work and city defence. According to the head of the patrol police of Mariupol Mykhailo Vershinin, Kohut helped with the defence of the city from Russian invaders and coordinated public utilities actions under intense shelling. Kohut held his last meeting with public utilities on 19 March, at that time street fighting was going on in the city. The last head of public services left the city on 24 March.

=== Claimed cholera outbreak ===
The destruction of Mariupol's sanitation infrastructure during the siege created severe public health risks. The World Health Organization warned in May 2022 of potential cholera outbreaks in occupied areas, with reports of wastewater flooding streets and sewage mixing with drinking water. On 6 June 2022, Ukrainian authorities warned that all preconditions for an outbreak were present, prompting Russian occupational authorities to impose a quarantine. Mayor Boychenko confirmed on 11 June that an outbreak of cholera had begun, with broken sanitation systems and unrecovered corpses contributing to the spread of disease. Epidemiologists warned that the outbreak risked spreading beyond Mariupol into the broader Donbas and potentially into Russia itself via troop rotations and deportations of Ukrainians to filtration camps.

==== Continuing sanitation concerns ====
On 23 June 2023, exiled Mariupol Mayor Vadym Boychenko warned on that tens of thousands of citizens might die from "dysentery and cholera due to the accumulation of garbage, sewage, and corpses in the city", while also claiming that Russian occupation authorities were doing "nothing" to address the issue.

=== Ukrainian missile strikes ===
In May 2023, the Ukrainian military began launching long-range missile strikes on Russian positions in Mariupol, who had started to turn the city and the surrounding villages into a military-logistics hub. On 26 May, the Ukrainians claimed that they had killed 250 Russian soldiers in a strike on the Azovstal Steelworks, with another 200 killed the previous week. On 29 May, the Ukrainians claimed to have again struck Mariupol, this time hitting the Yalta Health Center, with 650 Russian soldiers claimed to have been housed there. They claimed to have killed 100 Russians and wounded over 400 in the attack.

== Casualties ==
=== Military casualties ===
==== Ukrainian ====
Russia claimed that more than 4,000 Ukrainian soldiers had died up to the start of the siege of the Azovstal plant in mid-April and that the bodies of another 152 Ukrainian soldiers were found in a non-functioning refrigerated truck in Azovstal following the facility's siege. Explosives capable of destroying the bodies were found underneath them. The bodies would be handed over to Ukraine. By 12 June, Russia returned the bodies of some 220 deceased Ukrainian soldiers, all of whom had been fighting in the Azovstal steelworks, while "just as many bodies" still remained in Mariupol. A third of these were soldiers from the Azov unit. Subsequently, another 145 bodies of those killed in Mariupol were returned.

Initially, the State Bureau of Investigation decided to close proceedings against 277 servicemen of the 501st Separate Naval Infantry Battalion on suspicion of desertion. However, they later found that the battalion's commanding officers had defected to Russia and tricked the battalion into surrendering.

According to Russia, some 3,917 Ukrainian soldiers were captured during the siege, while Ukraine confirmed more than 3,500 soldiers, with an additional battalion, were taken prisoner. Around 700 of these were members of the Azov Battalion. On 8 June, over 1,000 prisoners of war were transferred from the DPR to Russia.

As of 25 October 2026, UALosses has confirmed the names of 1,247 Ukrainian soldiers killed, 1,310 missing, and 3,417 captured during the siege.

==== Russian and separatist ====
According to Ukraine, around 6,500 Russian soldiers were killed during the siege, with about four thousand of them being from only "one of three directions of attack on Mariupol". Ukraine also claimed that the 810th Naval Infantry Brigade of Russia's Black Sea Fleet had 158 killed, 500 wounded and 70 missing by mid-April. In addition, Ukraine claimed 14 special forces members of the Russian Spetsnaz GRU were killed by late March.

=== Civilian casualties ===
Mariupol's deputy mayor Serhiy Orlov stated on 9 March that at least 1,170 civilians in the city had been killed in the city since Russia's invasion began and the dead were being buried in mass graves. On 11 March, the city council stated that at least 1,582 civilians had been killed during the siege, increasing that number on 13 March to 2,187 having been killed by the latter date. On 14 March, Oleksiy Arestovych, an adviser to the Ukrainian president, stated that more than 2,500 civilians had been killed in Mariupol's siege. However, the city council later clarified that 2,357 civilians had died.

Pyotr Andryushchenko, an adviser to the city government, however stated that the council's count was inaccurate and estimated that total number of civilians killed could be as high as 20,000. The New York Times reported that officials in the city had been struggling to account for how many civilians had died or gone missing during the siege. Videos posted on Telegram showed that residents of the Cheremushky neighbourhood were forced to bury corpses in a courtyard, while others had to turn a post office building into a makeshift morgue, stacking it with dead bodies.

On 16 March, the Associated Press (AP) reported that it had documented that many of the dead were "children and mothers" contrary, it said, to Russian government claims that civilians had not been targeted. It also reported that doctors in Mariupol were saying that they were treating "10 injured civilians for every injured Ukrainian soldier."

On 11 April, Mariupol Mayor Vadym Boychenko stated that over 10,000 civilians had died in the Russian siege of Mariupol. On 12 April, city officials reported that up to 20,000 civilians had been killed. On the same day, the Mayor of the city reported that about 21,000 civilians had been killed. An updated Ukrainian death toll the following month put the number of civilians killed at at least 22,000.

By mid-June, the United Nations stated it had confirmed the deaths of 1,348 civilians, but said the true death toll was "likely thousands higher".

On 29 August, President of Mariupol Television, volunteer and civil activist Mykola Osychenko said to Dnipro TV that, according to the insider information, 87,000 deaths have been currently documented in morgues in Mariupol. Besides, 26,750 bodies are buried in mass graves, and many more are buried in the yards of the apartment blocks and private houses, or still under the rubble.

In early November, Ukraine stated that at least 25,000 civilians had been killed in Mariupol. In late December, based on the discovery of 10,300 new mass graves, the Associated Press estimated that the true death toll may be up to three times that figure. The Uppsala Conflict Data Program estimates of the total death toll resulting from the siege range from 27,000 to 88,000 fatalities, most of them civilians.

According to a 2023 study by Human Rights Watch and two other organisations, there were at least 8,034 excess deaths in Mariupol between March 2022 and February 2023.

The Greek minority in Ukraine which is concentrated in and around Mariupol was impacted heavily by the fighting. Sartana and Volnovakha, two towns near Mariupol with substantial Greek populations, were hit hard by Russian forces and nearly completely destroyed. Mariupol's deputy mayor Sergiy Orlov said that "half of those killed by Russian bombing" were ethnic Russians living in Ukraine.

As of 2026 part of the mass graves in Vinogradne and Mangush have been obscured by road construction, visible on satellite photos. Ukrainian investigative portal Slidstvo documented details of thousands of Mariupol residents who were searching for their relatives after 2022, including filing requests with Russian law enforcement and submitting DNA samples, but these were largely ignored.

As of November 2026, according to the Mariupol Justice Project, 12,500 civilians have been confirmed killed or missing.

== Humanitarian situation ==
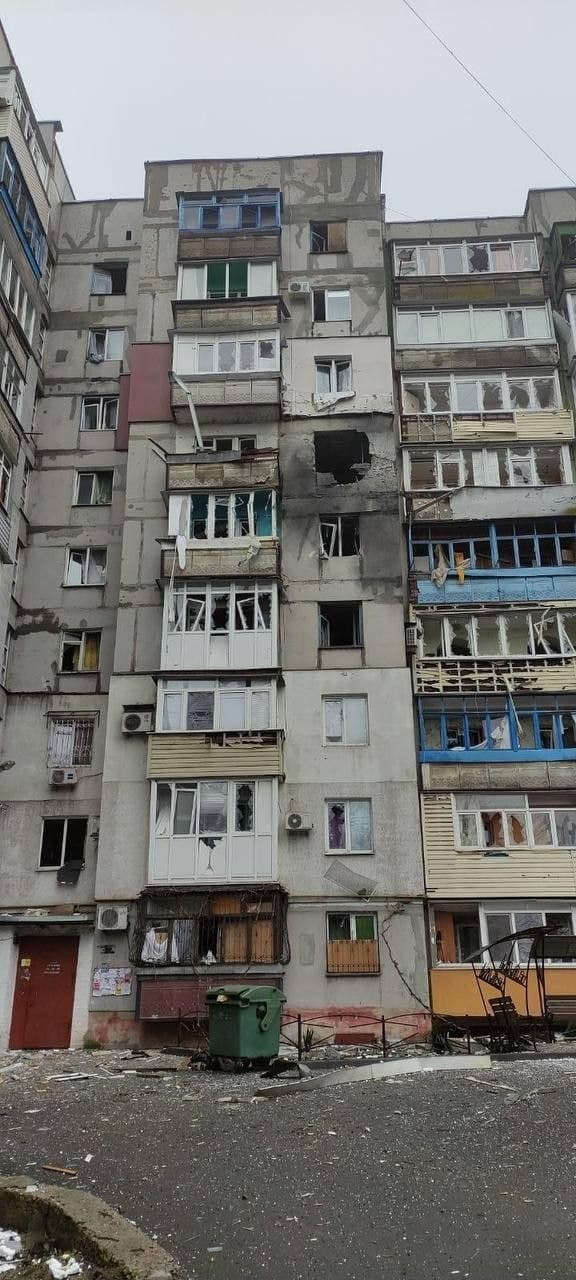
A shelled apartment building during around-the-clock attacks, 3 March 2022

On 6 March, Petro Andryushchenko, advisor to the mayor of Mariupol, reported that people were "drinking from puddles in the streets" due to the loss of running water in the city caused by days of around-the-clock Russian shelling and bombing attacks. He also stated that there was no heat, electricity or telephone service. According to US officials, civilians had been unable to evacuate the city due to repeated ceasefire violations, attacks on agreed-upon evacuation corridors, and direct attacks on civilians attempting to evacuate.

On 14 March, another spokesman for the ICRC announced that "hundreds of thousands" of people in the city were "facing extreme or total shortages of basic necessities like food, water and medicine." On 15 March, Ukraine's Deputy Prime Minister Iryna Vereshchuk accused Russian forces of taking around 400 civilians hostage after capturing a hospital in the city. Ukrainian officials accused Russian forces of firing at an evacuation convoy and injuring five civilians on 16 March. On 18 March, Ukrainian officials stated that more than 350,000 people were sheltering under siege in Mariupol, still with no access to food or water.

On 21 March, CNN reported that an official in Mariupol said that people are afraid, due to the constant bombing and shelling, to leave their underground shelters even to obtain food and water, meaning they were trying to drink less and eat less. On 22 March, CNN reported that the Russian Army had confiscated 11 buses that were headed into the city to evacuate citizens. Fox News later reported that at least some of the buses were filled with humanitarian supplies which were taken. It was also reported that 15 aid workers in the buses have been arrested while trying to get food into Mariupol. CNN also reported that to that date, all attempts to bring empty buses into Mariupol to evacuate civilians had failed. On 23 March, Zelenskyy announced that 100,000 civilians were still unable to get out of Mariupol and that they were trapped in "inhumane conditions" without food, running water or medicine.

On 1 April, a rescue effort by the UN to transport hundreds of civilian survivors out of Mariupol with 50 buses failed.

Ultimately the ICRC reported that it had helped facilitate the safe evacuation of over 10,000 civilians from Mariupol and Sumy.

== War crimes committed by Russian forces ==
Numerous war crimes were committed by Russian forces during the siege. Some media outlets described the crimes that occurred as the worst seen in the 21st century.

On 25 March, Russian Colonel-General Mikhail Mizintsev was accused by Ukrainian authorities of ordering the bombings of both the Mariupol Children's and Maternity Hospital and the city theatre where 1,200 civilians were sheltering. Mizintsev was nicknamed the "Butcher of Mariupol" by western and Ukrainian sources as a result of his alleged role in the siege, and sanctioned by the United Kingdom. Accused of personally directing war crimes during the siege, Mizintsev accused Ukrainian troops of creating a "terrible human catastrophe," and furthermore claimed that he would allow the safe exit of Ukrainian civilians from Mariupol. Mizintsev's claims were rejected by Deputy Prime Minister of Ukraine Iryna Vereshchuk as "manipulation."

The Uppsala Conflict Data Program estimated that 95% of casualties in the siege of Mariupol were civilians—a civilian casualty ratio higher than the one in the Gaza war (83%) and the Srebrenica massacre (92%), and surpassed in modern times only by the Rwandan genocide.

=== Killings and unlawful attacks on civilians ===
==== Shooting of evacuation checkpoints ====
On 7 March, US ambassador to the Organization for Security and Co-operation in Europe, Michael Carpenter, described two incidents that occurred in Mariupol on 5 and 6 March as war crimes. He stated that on both dates, Russian forces bombed agreed-upon evacuation corridors while civilians were trying to use them.

==== Maternity and children's hospital bombing ====
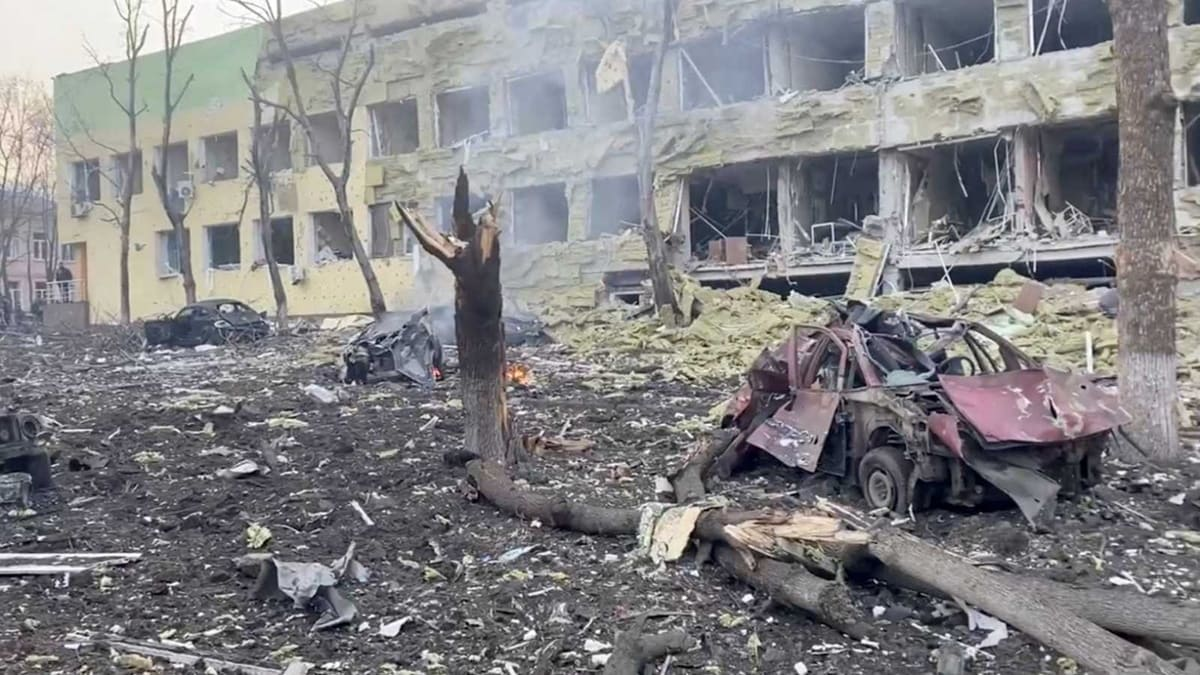
Consequences of the bombing of the children's hospital and maternity hospital in Mariupol, 9 March 2022

On 9 March, after an airstrike damaged a maternity ward and children's hospital, Zelenskyy tweeted that the attack was an "atrocity" along with a video of the building's ruins. The hospital was destroyed. Three people were killed, including a young girl and at least 16 were injured; authorities stated that many more patients and hospital staff were buried under rubble from the blast.

Russian foreign minister Sergey Lavrov said that the building was formerly a maternity hospital, and Russia bombed it because it was then occupied by the Azov Regiment.

Later on the same day, Russian Ministry of Foreign Affairs spokeswoman Maria Zakharova rejected the hospital bombing as "information terrorism", while Russian Ministry of Defence spokesman Igor Konashenkov called the bombardment staged.

Then, on the afternoon of 10 March, the Russian Embassy to the UK said in a tweet that two injured pregnant women seen being evacuated after the attack were actually played by actresses wearing "realistic make-up", that the maternity ward was occupied by the Azov Regiment and that no women or children had been present since the facility was "non-operational". The tweet was later removed by Twitter for violating their rules on disinformation. Dmitry Peskov, the press secretary for the Russian President, stated soon after the bombing that the Russian government would investigate the incident.

The accusation by Russia then began trending online in Russia, including on Russian Telegram social media, which has hundreds of thousands of followers. Twitter then took down the embassy's posts.

The pregnant woman videotaped being carried out wounded on a stretcher (accused by Russia of being an actress) was moved to another hospital and then died on 13 March, after her child was stillborn. She had suffered numerous injuries in the bombing, including a crushed pelvis and detached hip, which contributed to the stillbirth of her child. Seeing that she had lost her baby, medical workers said that she cried, "Kill me now." Thirty minutes later, she also died.

Russian claims that the videos were faked and that the bombed hospital was being used as a military post were debunked by investigative reporters. On 22 March, Russian journalist Alexander Nevzorov was charged under Russia's "false information" law after he published information about the Russian shelling of a maternity hospital in Mariupol. Under a new law passed on 4 March, he could be sentenced to up to 15 years in prison.

==== Regional theatre bombing ====
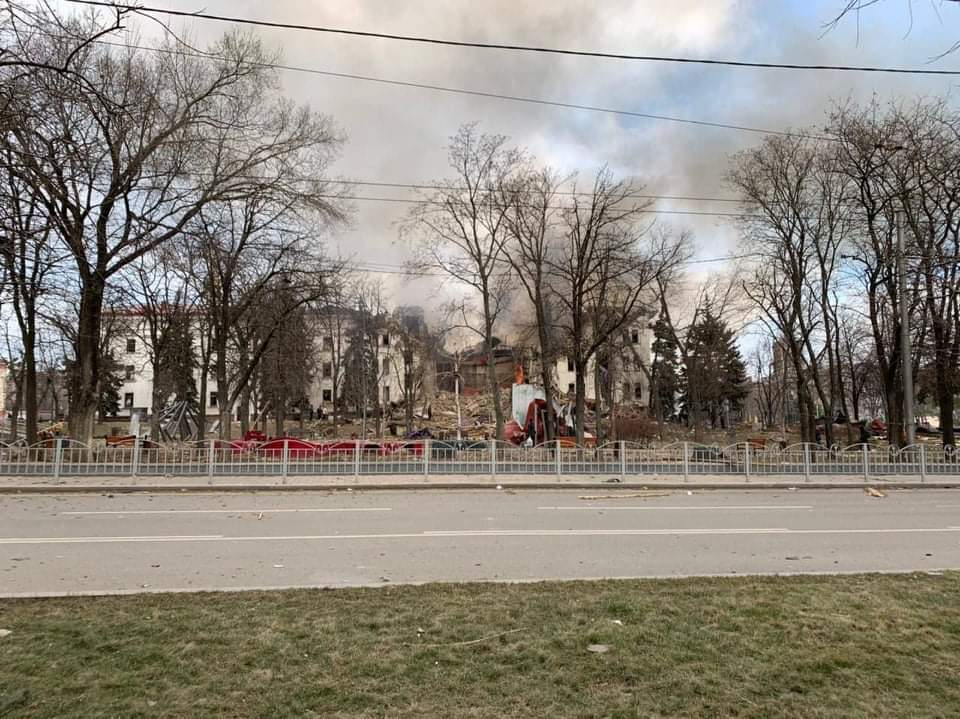
The Donetsk Regional Drama Theatre was bombed on 16 March

On 16 March, the Donetsk Academic Regional Drama Theatre of the city was struck and largely destroyed by an airstrike. The Mariupol City Council accused Russia of targeting the drama theatre, where at least hundreds of civilians had been sheltering. Human Rights Watch stated that the theatre was sheltering at least 500 civilians. Serhiy Taruta, the former governor of Donetsk Oblast, stated that 1,300 were sheltering inside.

A satellite image taken by Maxar Technologies on 14 March showed that the Russian word for "children" was written in large white letters on the pavement in both the front and the back of the theatre, which would make it clear that civilians were sheltering inside. Ukrainian Minister of Foreign Affairs Dmytro Kuleba claimed that Russia "could not have not known this was a civilian shelter". According to the Verkhovna Rada, it was impossible to start rescue operations at the theatre due to the ongoing shelling. The city council also stated that access to the shelter in the theatre was blocked by debris. The Russian Defense Ministry denied attacking the building and accused the Azov Regiment of blowing it up.

The bomb shelter in the basement, where people had been sheltering, however, was able to resist the attack according to Taruta. Survivors began emerging from the remains of the theatre on 17 March. More than 130 civilians had been rescued from the basement as of 18 March, according to Ukrainian officials, and rescuers had yet to find any fatalities. The city council stated that no one had died according to initial information, but one person was gravely wounded.

The Associated Press reported that 600 civilians were killed during the airstrike, double the official number given by the Ukrainian government.

==== Mass shelling of residential areas ====
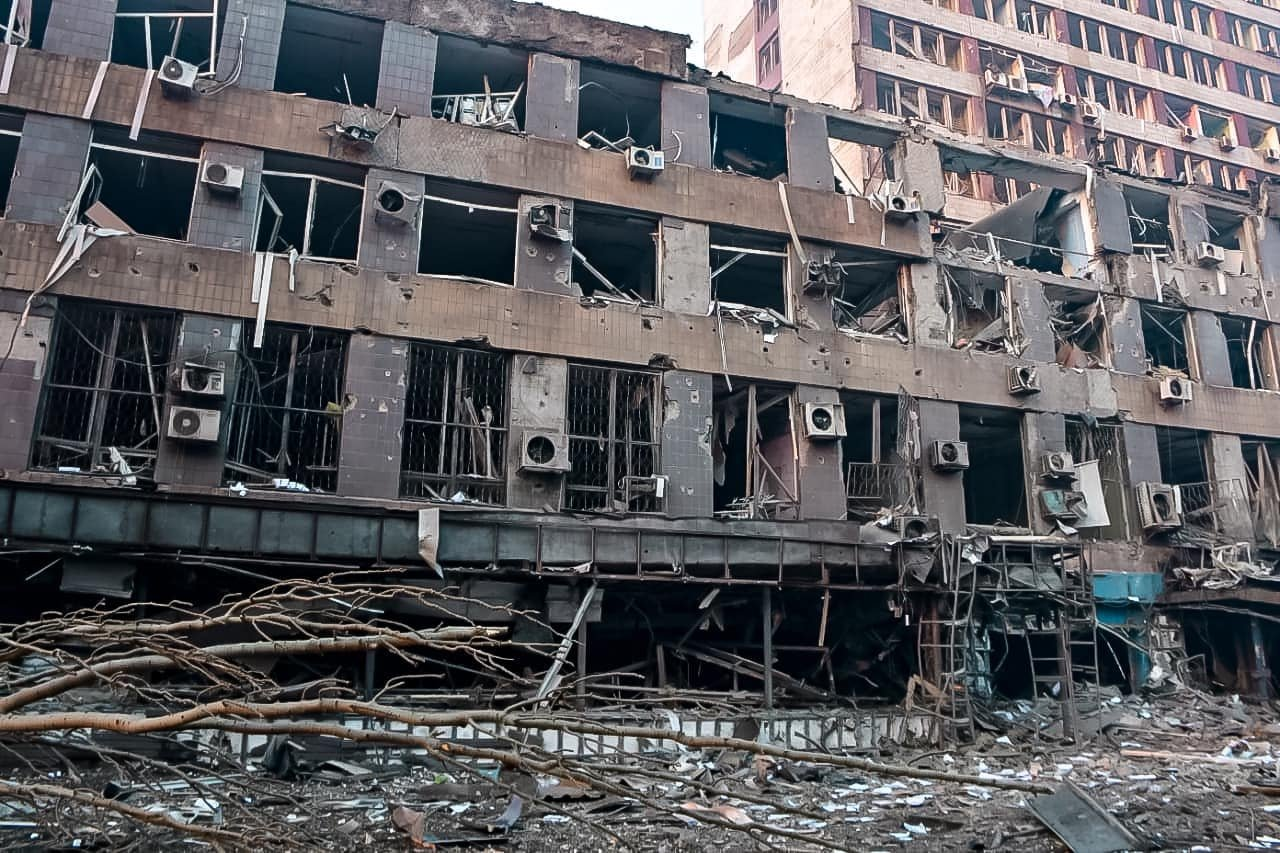
War damage in Mariupol, 12 March 2022

On 2 March, deputy mayor Sergiy Orlov reported that Russian artillery targeted a densely populated neighbourhood of Mariupol, shelling it for nearly 15 hours. He said that one populated residential district on the city's left bank had been "nearly totally destroyed".

Satellite photos of Mariupol taken the morning of 9 March taken by Maxar Technologies showed "extensive damage" to high-rise apartments, residential homes, grocery stores and other civilian infrastructure. This was determined by comparing before and after photos. The Mariupol council made a statement that the damage to the city has been "enormous". It estimated that approximately 80% of the city's homes had been significantly damaged, of which almost 30% were beyond repair. Reporting from Mariupol, Reuters reporter Pavel Klimov said that "all around are the blackened shells" of tower block dwellings.

On 16 March, BBC News reported that nearly constant Russian attacks had turned residential neighbourhoods into "a wasteland." On the same day it reported that it had obtained drone footage showing "a vast extent of damage, with fire and smoke billowing out of apartment blocks and blackened streets in ruins." A city resident told the BBC that "in the left bank area, there's no residential building intact, it's all burned to the ground." The left bank contained a densely populated residential district. She also said that the city centre is "unrecognisable." On the same day the Institute for the Study of War (ISW) reported that Russian forces continued to commit war crimes in Mariupol including "targeting civilian infrastructure."

On 18 March, Lieutenant General Jim Hockenhull, Chief of Defence Intelligence for the United Kingdom (UK), described "continued targeting of civilians in Mariupol". Ukrainian authorities stated that about 90% of buildings in Mariupol were now damaged or destroyed. On the same day, Sky News from the UK described videos as showing "civilian areas left unrecognisable by the bombing." Sky News also quoted the Red Cross as describing "Apocalyptic destruction in Mariupol." On 19 March 2022, a Ukrainian police officer in Mariupol made a video in which he said "Children, elderly people are dying. The city is destroyed and it is wiped off the face of the earth." The video was authenticated by the Associated Press.

The government of Mariupol said on 28 March that 90% of all buildings in Mariupol had been damaged by shelling, with 40% of all structures inside the city destroyed. The statistics released also counted that 90% of Mariupol's hospitals had been damaged, and that 23 schools and 28 kindergartens had been destroyed by Russian shelling.

By 18 April, Ukrainian officials estimated that at least 95% of Mariupol had been destroyed in the fighting, largely as a result of the Russian bombing campaigns.

On 12 April, city officials reported that up to 20,000 civilians had been killed. On the same day, the Mayor of the city reported that about 21,000 civilians had been killed.

=== Looting ===
Residents reported seeing Chechen fighters looting houses. Ukrainian officials alleged that Russian forces stole 2,000 artworks from museums of Mariupol and transferred them to Russia. On 28 May 2022, a Russian ship entered Mariupol port and took 2,700 tonnes of metal to the Russian port of Rostov-on-Don.

=== Rape ===
Chechen fighters and Russian soldiers raped or perpetrated sexual violence against Ukrainian women after the fall of Mariupol.

=== Forcible transfers or deportation ===
Numerous Ukrainian civilians, including children, were forcibly transferred to Russia.

=== Blocking of humanitarian aid and starvation ===
HRW accused Russian forces of the war crimes of blocking of humanitarian aid during the siege. A group of lawyers concluded that the Russian forces used starvation as a war crime against citizens trapped in the encircled Mariupol by denying them access to food and other necessities.

=== Alleged use of chemical weapons ===
On 11 April 2022, Eduard Basurin, a spokesperson for the Donetsk People's Republic, called for Russia to bring "chemical forces" to "smoke out the moles", referring to the Ukrainian forces in the Azovstal. Later on the same day, the Azov Regiment accused Russian forces of using "a poisonous substance of unknown origin" in Mariupol, causing respiratory problems. A Pentagon spokesperson said the reports were not confirmed, but they reflect concerns about Russia's potential use of chemical agents. Later, Ukraine stated that it was investigating the allegations. Three Ukrainian soldiers were injured in the incident.

As of 2022, according to experts, it was too soon to say what exactly had happened, UK and Ukrainian officials said that they suspected the use of white phosphorus, which is not typically regarded as a chemical weapon in international law.

== Media coverage ==
Associated Press staff member Mstyslav Chernov and freelancer Evgeniy Maloletka, working for AP, stayed in Mariupol from late February until 11 March. They were among the few journalists, and, according to the AP, the only international journalists in Mariupol during that period, and their photographs were extensively used by Western media to cover the siege and the situation in the city. According to Chernov, on 11 March, they were in a hospital taking photos, when they were evacuated from the city with the assistance of Ukrainian soldiers. They managed to escape from Mariupol unharmed, at which point, he said, no journalists were left in the city.

Testimonies from the Azovstal steel plant were made available via the Starlink satellite connections system. Thousands of Ukrainian troops cut off in Mariupol were able to use Starlink to send and publish online photos and videos to the outside world, before they had to surrender in May.

Reporting in the state-controlled media in Russia presented the invasion as a liberation mission and accused Ukrainian troops of attacking civilian targets in Mariupol. In March 2023, during a visit to the city by president Putin, Marat Khusnullin assured that Russian forces did not use artillery fire against residential buildings during their advance on Mariupol, while accusing Ukrainian forces of destruction during their retreat. Previously, a number of videos from during the siege, showed Russian tanks firing at residential buildings. On the same day as Putin talked to Khusnullin, Russian Izvestya published an interview with a commander of a Russian 2S4 "Tyulpan" mortar battery who described that their mortars were so powerful that they were able to collapse nine-story multi-apartment blocks specifically during the siege of Mariupol.

The Guardian observed in a piece on Mariupol published after the Russian attack on the Mariupol maternity ward that "Entire settlements reduced to rubble, attacks on civilian targets and the bombing of refugee exit routes were all part of Moscow's brutal Syria campaign", while the Washington Post under the headline "Russia's Ukraine war builds on tactics it used in Syria, experts say" related the effects on the civilian population as "dwindling food supplies. No electricity or water. Russian tanks roaming the streets. Nights punctuated by shelling." Ukrainian officials warned that this battle risked "becoming a second Aleppo." The Syria Civil Defense team said "They want to empty those cities of their population, so it will be less costly for Russia to take over," and indeed some estimates were that 75% of Mariupol's population had left by 31 March.

On 10 March 2024, creators of a documentary film 20 Days in Mariupol were awarded with the Oscar in the category "Best Documentary Feature Film", the first Oscar in Ukraine's history.

== See also ==
- Siege of Leningrad
- Destruction of Warsaw
- Battle of Grozny (1999–2000)
- Siege of Gaza City
- List of military engagements during the Russian invasion of Ukraine
- Timeline of the Russian invasion of Ukraine
