= 36th Marine Brigade =

Ukrainian military unit

- 36-та окрема бригада морської піхоти
- Active: 20 July 2015–present
- Country: Ukraine
- Branch: Ukrainian Marine Corps
- Role: Marine Infantry
- Size: Brigade
- Garrison/HQ: Mykolaiv, Mykolaiv Oblast
- Patron: Mykhailo Bilinskyi
- Mottos: With us is God and Victory
- Engagements: War in Donbas; Russian invasion of Ukraine; Siege of Mariupol; Battle of Mykolaiv; Kherson counteroffensive; 2023 Ukrainian counteroffensive; Dnieper campaign
- Website: Facebook

Commanders
- Current commander: Lt. Col. Mykyta Vitek
- Notable commanders: Viktor Sikoza; Volodymyr Baranyuk; Serhii Volynskyi

Insignia
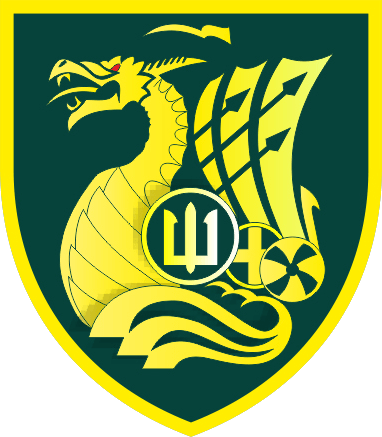
- Old unit patch 2015 – 2023

- Flag

The 36th Marine Brigade "Rear Admiral Mykhailo Bilinskyi" (Note: Ukrainian: 36-та окрема бригада морської піхоти імені контрадмірала Михайла Білинського, romanized: 36-ta okrema bryhada morskoi pikhoty imeni kontradmirala Mykhaila Bilynskoho) is a Ukrainian military unit. It was formed in 2015 from the 1st and 501st Marine Battalions, which had been previously part of Ukraine's 36th Coastal Defense Brigade and had been withdrawn from Russian-annexed Crimea. The brigade has participated in the war in Donbas since its formation. In February 2022, when Russia invaded Ukraine, the majority of the brigade was located in Mariupol.

== Establishment ==
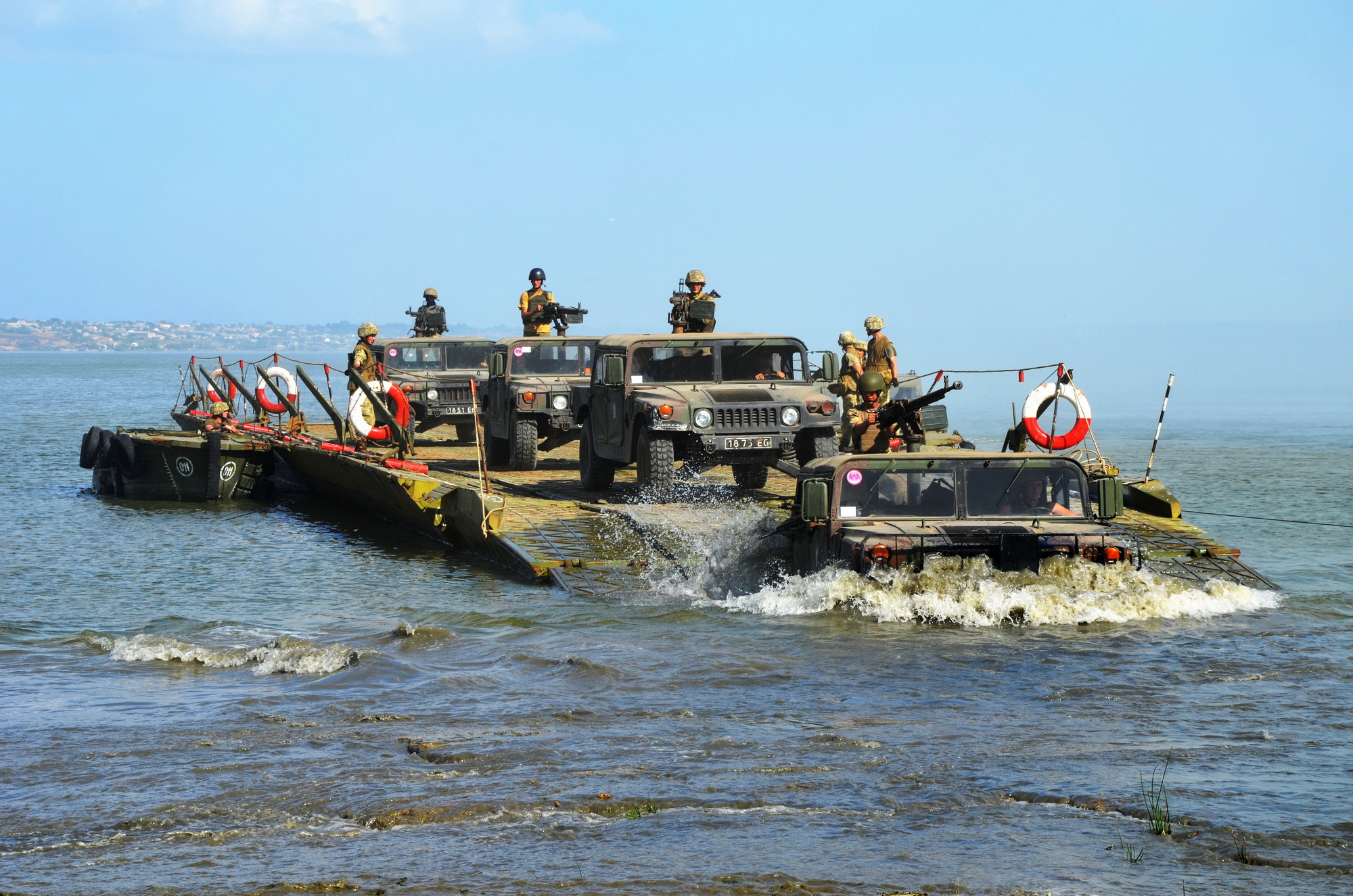
36th Brigade in an amphibious warfare exercise

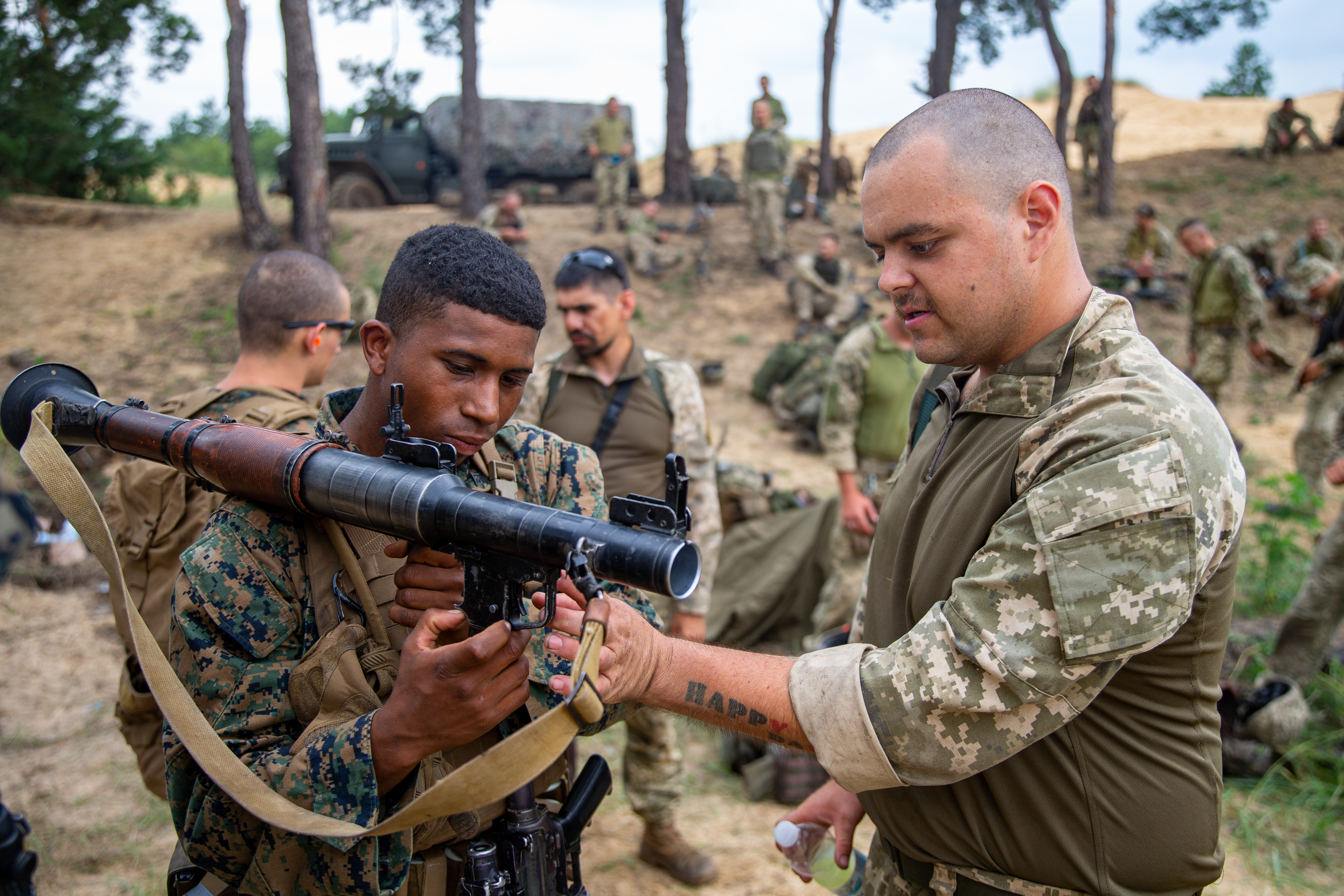
British-Ukrainian marine Aiden Aslin of the 36th Brigade demonstrates a RPG-7 to a US Marine

On 20 July 2015, less than a year following the evacuation of Ukrainian forces from Crimea, the 36th Marine Brigade was formed from military units which had remained loyal to Ukraine following the peninsula's annexation by Russia. The brigade's first commander was Dmytro Deliatytskyi, who had formerly commanded the 1st Marine Battalion.

== Russian invasion of Ukraine ==
=== Mariupol ===
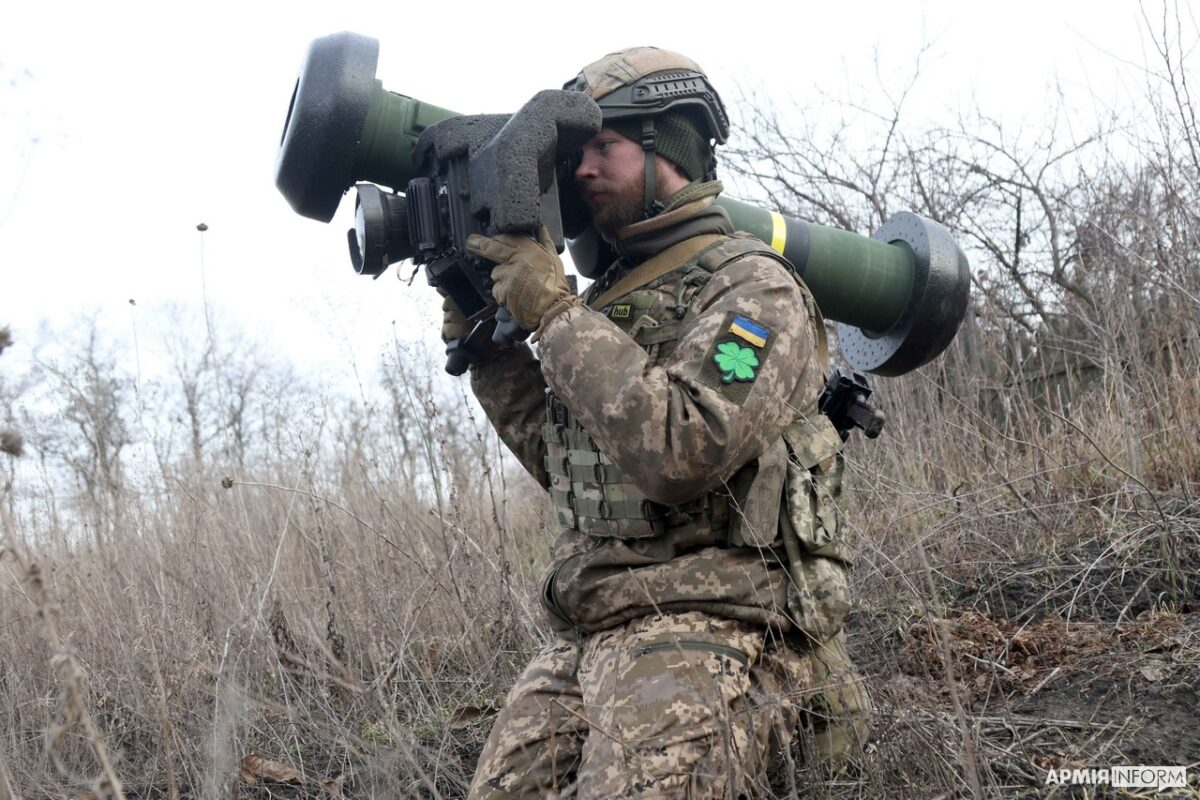
A member of the 36th Brigade with an FGM-148 Javelin, January 2023

During the 2022 Russian invasion of Ukraine, the 501st Battalion of the 36th Brigade was one of the three main Ukrainian units, along with the Azov Regiment, defending Mariupol during its siege by Russian and DPR forces. The battalion was largely destroyed during the course of the siege.

On 13 April, the Ukrainian government forces stated that, as a result of a special operation, units of the 36th Marine Brigade managed to connect with the Azov Regiment in Mariupol. The same day, Russian sources claimed that over 1,000 men of the brigade had been captured, but this remains unconfirmed. The brigade commander, Colonel Volodymyr Baraniuk, and his chief of staff were among those captured, leaving Major Serhii Volyna in command of the remnants of the battalion entrenched inside the Azovstal Iron and Steel Works. The remnants of the unit surrendered on 20 May 2022, along with the remaining defenders of the Azovstal plant.

=== Mykolaiv ===
While most of the 36th Brigade's units were stationed in Mariupol at the time of the invasion, other elements of the brigade defended its garrison, Mykolaiv, during the early months of the Russian invasion of Ukraine. Later the brigade fought over control of the Kherson Oblast during the 2022 Ukrainian southern counteroffensive. The brigade took part in the 2023 Ukrainian counteroffensive.

On 18 March, two Russian Kalibr missiles, fired from nearby Kherson, struck a Ukrainian army barracks in Mykolaiv housing some 200 soldiers whom were asleep at the time of the attack. Reports from the city morgue and Ukrainian soldiers stated that at least 80 Ukrainian soldiers were killed. It is presumed nearly all 200 soldiers were killed, as only one survivor was pulled from the rubble the next day and temperatures reached below 6 °C (43 °F) during the night.

=== Later operations ===
On 19 October 2023, the brigade lost 90 men killed and wounded in a Russian Iskander strike while attempting to establish a bridgehead under the Antonivka railway bridge on the left bank of the Dnieper, according to a source in the brigade's command interviewed by Ukrainska Pravda.

== Structure ==
As of 2024 the brigade's structure is as follows:

- 36th Marine Brigade, A2802 Commander Lt. Col. Mykyta Vitek
  - Headquarters & Services Company
  - 1st Separate Marine Battalion, (1 ОБМП, m/u А2777, until 2014: А2272), Mykolaiv. Commander Lt. Col. Vladyslav Galkin
    - In 2014 during the annexation of Crimea, only 137 soldiers decided to return to Ukraine. In 2022, a few soldiers of the battalion were able to sneak out of the besieged Mariupol).
  - 501st Separate Marine Battalion, (501 ОБМП, m/u А1965 (А0669), Berdiansk.
    - In 2014 during the annexation of Crimea, only 64 soldiers decided to return to Ukraine). During the Siege of Mariupol in 2022, the unit was captured. The battalion was reconstituted in 2023 and fought on the Donetsk front, and later the 2023 Ukrainian counteroffensive in Zaporizhia.
        - FPV Drone Unit "Gryphon" (БпЛА «Грифон»)
  - 1st Aristide Battalion. 1st linear marine battalion of the brigade.
    - In 2022, a few soldiers of the battalion were able to sneak out of the besieged Mariupol).
  - 2nd Black Battalion. 2nd linear marine battalion of the brigade.
    - Attack Drone Company "Couriers of the Apostle Peter" («Курʼєри апостола Петра»)
    - FPV Unit "It's not us" («Це не ми»)
    - Fire Support Company
  - Marine Tank Battalion Equipped with T-80BVs. The unit was defeated during the Siege of Mariupol in 2022.
  - Brigade Artillery Group. Equipped with 2S1 and 2S3 self-propelled artillery and BM-21 Grads.
    - Control and Artillery Reconnaissance Battery
    - Howitzer Self-propelled Artillery Division
    - 2nd Self-propelled Artillery Division, 2nd SADn (122mm D30 howitzer)
    - Anti-tank Artillery Division (ПТРК 36 ОБрМП)
    - Reactive Artillery Division
  - Anti-Aircraft Missile and Artillery Division. Equipped with 2K22 Tunguska and 2K35 Strela-10 vehicles.
  - Subversive-Assault Group "Bears" (ДШГ «Ведмеді»)
  - Attack Drone Company "Owls"
  - Reconnaissance Company
  - Sniper Company
  - Electronic Warfare Company
  - CBRN Protection Company
  - Repair and Restoration Battalion.
  - Engineering Support Group
  - Material Support Battalion
  - Field Communication Node
  - Medical Company
