= 12th Operational Brigade =

National Guard of Ukraine unit

129th Special Motorized Militia Battalion (1990–1992) 10th Separate Battalion of the NGU (1992–1995) 17th Separate Special Motorized Battalion (1995–2014) 18th Operational Regiment of the National Guard of Ukraine (2014–2019) 12th Separate Operational Brigade (2019–2023)
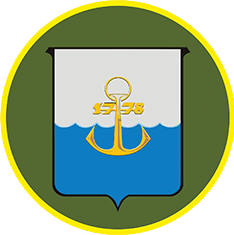
- Brigade Insignia
- Active: 1990–2023
- Country: Soviet Union (1990–1991); Ukraine
- Branch: Internal Troops of the Soviet Union (1990–1991); National Guard of Ukraine (1991–1995); Internal Troops of Ukraine (1995–2014); National Guard of Ukraine (2014–2023)
- Type: Brigade
- Size: Five Battalions
- Garrison/HQ: Mariupol
- Nickname: Dmytro Vyshnevetsky Brigade
- Engagements: Russo-Ukrainian War; War in Donbass; Battle of Mariupol (2014); Russian invasion of Ukraine; Siege of Mariupol
- Decorations: Courage and Bravery

Commanders
- Notable commanders: Colonel Denis Oleksiyovych Shlega; Colonel Serhii Yevhenovich Sovinskyi; Colonel Oleksandr Ivanovych Kryachko

The 12th Brigade of Operational Assignment (12 BrOP — military unit 3057) was a military formation of the National Guard of Ukraine. It was part of the Eastern operational territorial association. It was based in Mariupol, Donetsk Oblast.

The Brigade fought against Russian and Russian separatists during the Russo-Ukrainian war. The Azov Regiment was placed under the aegis of the 12th Brigade. After the Siege of Mariupol in 2022, most of the formation suffered heavy casualties, and in 2023 most of the survivors were transferred and reorganized into the 12th Special Purpose "Azov" Brigade.

== History ==
=== Establishment ===
On January 18, 1990, the 129th Special Motorized Militia Battalion of the Internal Troops of the Ministry of Internal Affairs of the USSR (military unit 5509) was formed in Mariupol.

On January 2, 1992, the 10th Separate Battalion of the NGU (military unit 1041) was formed out of the 129th special motorized police battalion and integrated into the 4th Northern Division. In 1995, the battalion was transferred to the Internal Troops of the Ministry of Internal Affairs of Ukraine and renamed the 17th Separate Special Motorized Battalion (military unit 3057).

=== Battle of Mariupol ===
In April 2014, the situation in the city of Mariupol became significantly complicated. Supporters of the self-proclaimed Donetsk People's Republic held systematic unauthorized rallies with attempts to seize government-held installations, including the seizure of the Mariupol City Hall building. From April 10 through 14, 2014, supporters of the DPR, led by the so-called "people's mayor," Denis Kuzmenko, and personnel from the armed wing of their security service made periodic visits to a checkpoint manned by military unit 3057 to persuade its commanding officers to submit to the leadership of the DPR and surrender their weapons for use by the separatists. After receiving a refusal, saboteurs blocked the checkpoint with tires, sandbags, and other objects. By the next morning, the remains of the barricade were removed with the assistance of the police.

On April 16, 2014, servicemen of the 17th Separate Battalion under the command of Serhiy Sovinskyi repelled an attempt to capture the unit's HQ. At 20:00, a group of female protestors started an unauthorized rally at the gate of the unit's HQ. This was meant to distract military personnel guarding the facility. The protests were followed by an armed attack at 20:30. Protesters started throwing Molotov cocktails and tearing down gates, demanding that the personnel hand over their weapons. Realizing the futility of their actions, they began to request reinforcements over the radio. Minibuses carrying armed men in uniforms and balaclavas arrived twenty minutes later. A total of about 200 people began attacking the facility with small-arms fire. Shelling was carried out along the entire perimeter from nearby houses. The servicemen of the 17th Battalion at first responded with warning shots, then when these went unheeded, proceeded to return fire on DPR forces. The 17th held their position until midnight, until they were reinforced by units of the Mariupol police. At least 19 attackers were wounded, 3 of them fatally.

=== Restructuring ===
In December 2014, the unit was reformed into the 18th Operational Regiment of the National Guard of Ukraine, and during the next four months, its ranks were replenished with servicemen from the "Azov" and "Donbas" special forces battalions.

Thus, in 2015, the regiment included:

- A patrol battalion
- Donbas Battalion
- Azov Battalion
- A special patrol company
- A rifle company (reserve)

On September 9, 2016, the "Donbas" battalion was transferred to the 15th Regiment, which was stationed in the city of Sloviansk.

In October 2019, the regiment was reorganized as 12th Separate Operational Brigade.

=== Siege of Mariupol ===
The brigade took part in the Siege of Mariupol. After the start of the Russian invasion of Ukraine on February 24, the brigade took up the defense in the city of Mariupol. On 16 April 2022, Russian forces captured the base of the unit, in western Mariupol. Together with other units, the brigade defended the city until May 2022, at which time the final blockade of the Ukrainian troops at the Azovstal plant was carried out. On May 3, the brigade commanders reported on the catastrophic situation at the plant and called on the military-political leadership of Ukraine and the International community to evacuate all troops from the territory of "Azovstal".

=== Reformation into Azov Brigade ===
During the Siege of Mariupol, most of the troops of the Azov Regiment were captured, the remaining troops and the 12th Brigade were then reorganized into the 12th Special Purpose "Azov" Brigade.

== Honours ==
On March 24, 2018, by decree of the President of Ukraine, with the 18th Operational Regiment was awarded the honorary title "name of Dmytro Vyshnevetsky" after Dmytro Vyshnevetsky.

On October 27, 2022, the unit received the honorary award "For Courage and Bravery" by the decree of the President of Ukraine Volodymyr Zelenskyy.

== Commanders ==
- Colonel Serhii Yevhenovich Sovinskyi (2014)
- Colonel Oleksandr Ivanovych Kryachko (2014–2021)
- Colonel Denis Oleksiyovych Shlega (2021–2022).
