= Volodymyr Baraniuk =

Ukrainian soldier and colonel (born 1974)

- Володимир Анатолійович Баранюк
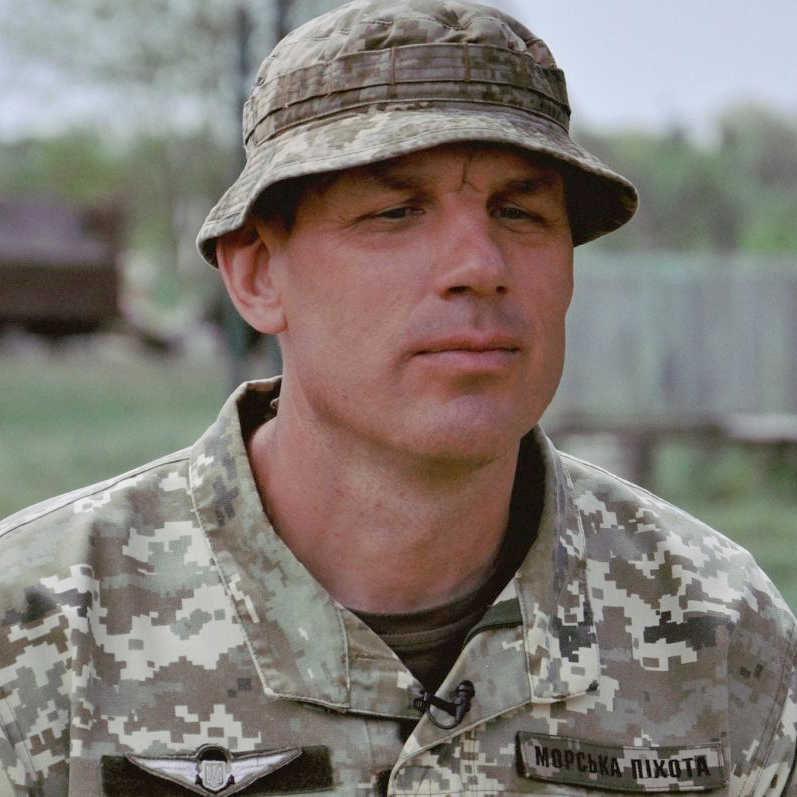
- Baraniuk c. 2021
- Born: Volodymyr Anatoliiovych Baraniuk; 1974 (age 51–52); Ukrainian SSR, Soviet Union
- Military career
- Allegiance: Ukraine
- Branch: Ukrainian Marine Corps
- Service years: 2000–2022
- Rank: Colonel
- Unit: 36th Separate Marine Brigade
- Battles/wars: Russo-Ukrainian War; Annexation of Crimea by the Russian Federation; War in Donbas; Russian invasion of Ukraine; Siege of Mariupol (POW)
- Awards: Hero of Ukraine; Order of Bohdan Khmelnytsky

Volodymyr Anatoliiovych Baraniuk (Ukrainian: Володимир Анатолійович Баранюк; born 1974) is a Ukrainian Marine Corps colonel. He commanded the 36th Separate Marine Brigade from September 2021 to March 2022 and is best known for his role during the Siege of Mariupol.

== Biography ==
Baraniuk started his military career in 2000, as platoon commander in the 1st Separate Marine Brigade in Crimea. In 2014, at the time of the Russian takeover of Crimea, and subsequently got detained and beaten up by the Russian forces. He was deputy commander of the 1st Separate Marine Battalion, stationed in Feodosia, of which he assumed command in April 2015. In 2014, he was awarded the Order of Bohdan Khmelnytsky, 3rd degree.

Baraniuk was appointed deputy commander of the 36th Separate Marine Brigade in November 2020, and commander of the brigade in September 2021. At the outbreak of the Russian invasion of Ukraine, in February 2022, the brigade was stationed in Mariupol, where it became quickly surrounded by the Russian advances from the east and from the southwest. During the subsequent siege, Baraniuk was one of the leaders of the defense of Mariupol, along with the commander of the Azov Regiment, Lieutenant Colonel Denys Prokopenko; Baraniuk was also the highest-ranking officer among the besieged forces. On 19 March 2022, President Volodymyr Zelenskyy awarded the Order of Hero of Ukraine to Colonel Baraniuk and Lieutenant Colonel Prokopenko.

As the Russian forces gradually captured most of the city, the 36th Separate Marine Brigade entrenched itself within the Illich Steel and Iron Works. In the night between 11 and 12 April, the brigade attempted a breakout, as a result of which some 500 marines managed to link up with Ukrainian forces present in Azovstal iron and steel works, while an unknown number were killed or captured and over a thousand, including some 400 wounded, were taken prisoner when Russian forces seized the Illich steel plant on the following day. Afterwards, the whereabouts of Colonel Baraniuk became unknown, with Major Serhiy Volynskyi assuming command of the remnants of the brigade besieged in the Azovstal plant. On 17 April Eduard Basurin, spokesman of the DPR Military Command, claimed that Baraniuk had been killed during the breakout attempt and that his body had been identified, but no evidence was provided for this claim.

On 8 May 2022, Baraniuk appeared alive in an interview with RT, proving previous reports of his death to be false. It was stated that he had been captured in a field a few kilometers north of Mariupol, together with his chief of staff, Colonel Dmytro Kormiankov (who also appeared in the interview), and a number of his men. He is currently held by the Russian Federation as a prisoner of war.

Military offices
Preceded by Andrii Hnatov	Commander of 36th Separate Marine Brigade; 2021–2022	Succeeded by Serhiy Volynskyi
