= Maria Márkus =

Polish sociologist and philosopher

Maria Renata Márkus (1936 – September 2017) was a Polish sociologist and philosopher.

== Life ==
She was educated in philosophy at the Lomonosov University in Moscow from 1952 to 1957 and was awarded her master's degree in Poland in 1957. She moved to Hungary in 1957 and became a research fellow at the Institute of Philosophy of the Hungarian Academy of Sciences and was a founding member of the Institute of Sociology at the academy where she worked closely with András Hegedüs. In 2010, a Festschrift was published in her honour. The journal Thesis Eleven published an issue to commemorate her in 2019.

She was a member of the “Budapest School” of Marxism, along with other philosophers and sociologists such as Ágnes Heller, György Márkus, István Mészáros, Ferenc Fehér and Mihály Vajda. The School was disbanded after the Prague Spring and many of its members forced into exile. Márkus, along with other members of the School, lost her academic position on ideological and political grounds. She moved to Australia in 1978 and worked as a Senior Lecturer in Sociology at the University of New South Wales. She has published widely on topics including on the sociology of work, industrial sociology, political sociology, the sociology of economics, stratification, philosophy and sociological theory, feminism and industry, as well as on the shifting boundaries of the private and public spheres. The idea of a 'decent society' emerged as a central theme in her later work. Equally important in her work, but also in the broader work of the Budapest School and their interest in the idea of needs, was Maria Markus' idea of the 'politicisation of needs' within the School's broader framework of radical democracy.

She was a "friend and intellectual ally of Agnes Heller". Markus was married to Hungarian philosopher György Márkus.

== Selected publications ==
- Markus, M. R. (2010), 'Can solitude be recaptured for the sake of intimacy?', in H. Blatterer, P. Johnson & M. R. Markus (eds), Modern privacy: shifting boundaries, new forms, New York: Palgrave Macmillan, pp. 88–101.
- Markus, M. R. (2010), 'Lovers and friends: 'radical utopias' of intimacy?', Thesis Eleven, vol. 101, pp. 6–23.
- Markus, M. R. (2002), 'Cultural pluralism and the subversion of the 'taken-for-granted' world', in P. Essed & D. T. Goldberg (eds), Race Critical Theories: Text and Context, Oxford: Blackwell.
- Markus, M. R. (2001), 'Decent society and/or civil society?', Social Research, vol. 68, no. 4, pp. 1011–1030.
- Markus, M. R. (1995), 'Civil society and the politicisation of needs', in K. Gavroglu, J. Stachel & M. W. Wartofsky (eds), Science, Politics and Social Practice, The Netherlands: Kluwer Academic, pp. 161–179.
- Markus, M (1987), 'The 'anti-feminism' of Hannah Arendt', Thesis Eleven, vol. 17, no. 1, pp. 76–87.
- Markus, M (1985), 'Women, success, and civil society: submission to, or subversion of, the achievement principle', PRAXIS International, vol. 4, no. 5, pp. 430–444.
- Markus, M (1982), 'Overt and covert modes of legitimation in East European Societies', in T. H. Rigby & F Fehér, Political legitimation in communist states, pp. 82–93.
