= Budapest School =

School of Marxist humanism

The Budapest School (Hungarian: Budapesti iskola; German: Budapester Schule) was a school of thought, originally of Marxist humanism, but later of post-Marxism and dissident liberalism that emerged in Hungary in the early 1960s, belonging to so-called Hungarian New Left. Its members were students or colleagues of Georg Lukács. The school was originally oriented towards developing Lukács' later works on social ontology and aesthetics, but quickly began to challenge the paradigm of Lukácsian Marxism, thus reconstructing contemporary critical theory. Most of the members later came to abandon Marxism. The school also critiqued the "dictatorship over needs" of the Soviet states. Most of the members were forced into exile by the pro-Soviet Hungarian government.

In a letter to The Times Literary Supplement February 15, 1971, Georg Lukács drew attention to "The Budapest School of Marxism", and helped attract attention to the school from Western Marxism.

Members of the school include György Lukács, Ágnes Heller, Ferenc Fehér, György Márkus, Andrew Arato, István Mészáros, Mihály Vajda, and Maria Márkus, among others. The Budapest School's writings have been read and researched widely since the 1960s.

== History ==
The 1956 Hungarian Revolution was one of the most important political events of Ágnes Heller's life, for at this time she saw the effect of the academic freedoms of Marxist critical theory as dangerous to the entire political and social structure of Hungary. The uprising confirmed Heller's ideas that what Karl Marx really intended is for the people to have political autonomy and collective determination of social life.

Lukács, Heller, and other Marxist critical theorists emerged from the Revolution with the belief that Marxism and socialism needed to be applied to different nations in individual ways, effectively questioning the role of the Soviet Union in Hungary's future. These ideas set Heller on an ideological collision course with the new Moscow-supported government of János Kádár. Heller was again expelled from the Communist Party and she was dismissed from the university in 1958 for refusing to indict Lukács as a collaborator in the Revolution.

From 1963 can be seen the emergence of what would later be called the Budapest School, a philosophical forum that was formed by Lukács to promote the renewal of Marxist criticism in the face of actually existing socialism and its theories. Other participants in the Budapest School included together with Heller her second husband Ferenc Fehér, György Márkus, Mihály Vajda, and some other scholars with looser connections to the school (such as András Hegedüs, István Eörsi, János Kis, and György Bence). The school emphasized the idea of the renaissance of Marxism, described by radical philosophy scholar Simon Tormey as "a flowering of the critical, oppositional potential they believed lay within Marxism and in particular within the 'early Marx' ... the Marxism of the individual 'rich in needs,' of solidarity and self-governance ... they hoped to precipitate a crisis in those systems that had the temerity to call themselves 'socialist'."

The Budapest School carried out research on the political economy of both the Soviet Union and Western capitalism. The school accepted many of the critiques of Soviet planning and inefficiency from Neoclassical Economics, as well as the connection between markets and freedom. The Soviet system was condemned as a dictatorship over needs. The school also analyzed the mixed economies of modern capitalism. Most traditional Marxist economics was jettisoned. Sweden and the Nordic Model was held as a model of the mixed economy and managed capitalism. The school advocated radical democracy as a solution to the authoritarian and undemocratic features of the mixed economy.

Lukács’ death in 1971 deprived the members of the Budapest School of the degree of protection he had been able to offer against an increasingly hostile regime, and in 1973 the Communist Party officially condemned their work and the members of the group were dismissed from their academic positions.

== See also ==
- Andrew Arato
- Ágnes Heller
- György Márkus
- Maria Márkus
- István Mészáros
- Mihály Vajda
- Post-Marxism
