= Andrew Arato =

Hungarian academic

- Born: Arató András; 22 August 1944 (age 82); Budapest, Kingdom of Hungary
- Awards: Distinguished Fulbright Professor; Honorary Professor, University of the Witwatersrand

Education
- Education: Queens College (BA, 1966); University of Chicago (MA, 1968; PhD, 1975)
- Doctoral advisor: Leonard Krieger; William H. McNeill

Philosophical work
- Era: Contemporary philosophy
- Region: Western philosophy
- School: Continental philosophy Budapest School; Critical theory
- Institutions: Cooper Union; The New School; Central European University; Sciences Po; School for Advanced Studies in the Social Sciences; Goethe University Frankfurt; University of the Witwatersrand
- Main interests: History of political thought, civil society, political theory, democratic theory, constitutional theory, political sociology
- Notable works: Civil Society and Political Theory (1992)
- Notable ideas: Post-sovereign constitution-making

Andrew Arato (Hungarian: Arató András [ˈɒrɒtoː ˈɒndraːʃ]; born 22 August 1944) is a critical theorist and a professor of Political and Social Theory in the Department of Sociology at The New School. He is best known for his influential 1992 book Civil Society and Political Theory, coauthored with Jean L. Cohen. He is also known for his work on critical theory and constitutions and was, from 1994 to 2014, co-editor of the journal Constellations with Nancy Fraser and Nadia Urbinati.

== Education ==
Arato first attended Queens College in New York City, completing his B.A. in history in 1966. Subsequently, Arato moved to the University of Chicago to complete his M.A. in 1968 and Ph.D. in 1975 with a dissertation entitled 'The Search for the Revolutionary Subject: The Philosophy and Social Theory of the Young Lukács 1910-1923' under the guidance of Leonard Krieger and William H. McNeill. In preparation for his dissertation, Arato conducted preliminary research at the Hungarian Academy of Sciences in the spring of 1970 under the guidance of Budapest School scholars Ágnes Heller, György Márkus, and Mihály Vajda.

== Four stages of Arato's thought ==
A distinct chronology defines Arato's intellectual biography, which often parallels and was inspired by the evolution in thinking of opposition intellectuals in the former communist countries of Eastern Europe and, most especially, in Hungary, the country of Arato's birth. At the same time, much of his work was hammered out in conjunction with his longtime intellectual partner Jean L. Cohen, and strongly influenced by the philosophical and sociological work of Jürgen Habermas.

Arato's intellectual itinerary can be simplified into four overlapping stages: It begins with (I) efforts to revitalize Marxism by drawing on a Hegelian Marxist philosophy of "praxis". In a second phase, (II) Arato worked through the corpus of Western Marxian thinkers to construct a critical theory of state socialist societies. Phase three was (III) marked by a turn to a post-Marxist emphasis on civil society as a moral and analytical category meant to further the project of democratization in both the East and West. Finally, in his latest work, (IV) Arato engages in comparative studies of recent constitution-making and has developed a theory of "post-sovereign" constitution-making.

=== First stage: Praxis theory (1971–1979) ===
The first phase of Arato's academic work emphasized the recovery of an early humanistic Hegelian Marxism. Such Hegelian Marxism highlighted the active constitution of the social order through "praxis," that is, the collective action of interacting groups. Arato's philosophical investigations here paralleled the thought of critical intellectuals in the East and especially the "Budapest School" in a “renaissance of Marxism” during the 1960s and early 1970s. This perspective was also manifested in the philosophical outlook of the American journal of radical theory Telos. Arato served on Telos’s editorial board from 1971 to 1984.

Arato's emphasis on social praxis and the concomitant categories of subjectivity, culture and alienation was displayed in his dissertation on the early 20th-century Marxian philosophy of György Lukács. As Arato notes in his 1979 book, The Young Lukacs and the Origins of Western Marxism, the elaboration of a critical Western Marxism with its emphasis on intentional collective action or praxis was also intended as a critique of the authoritarian communist governments in Eastern Europe. Arato's praxis theory and Western Marxism in general privileged the active, democratic participation of groups and individuals in their supposedly collective self-determination, and they criticized orthodox communist parties with their claims to know the true interests of the working class and to be able to make the proper decisions for them in a form of “substitutionalism.” In contrast to the control of the communist state with its enforced passivity of working classes, “true socialism,” said Western Marxists, should be democracy – democracy extended from the political sphere to the economy and indeed to all social institutions. This implicit critique of state socialist societies, however, largely operated at the level of abstract social philosophy. As Hungarian critics Gyorgy Bence and Janos Kis noted, this rebirth of Marxian philosophy in the East “sidestepped the problem of basic class antagonism” intrinsic to the socialist dictatorships of Eastern Europe.

=== Second stage: State socialism (1979–1981) ===
In the second stage of his intellectual itinerary, Arato made this exact turn from social philosophy to the critical analysis of East European social formations during the late 1970s to the early 1980s.

His operating procedure was somewhat scholastic. One after another, Arato examined neo-Marxist analyses of state socialism written by such authors as Herbert Marcuse, Cornelius Castoriadis, Rudolf Bahro, Habermas, and Iván Szelényi. He critically assessed the adequacy of their efforts to analyze the social dynamics, stratification, crisis potentiality and legitimating ideology of state socialist societies. In all this, Arato sought to model himself on Marx by analyzing and criticizing the exploitative, hierarchical dimensions of the social formation. He recognized, however, that the theoretical tools offered by Marx himself – that is, historical materialism – were often used by state socialist societies to veil their politically based class inequalities, not expose them.

Further, Arato argued that Marxian writers were typically trapped by the problematic of Marx's philosophy of history, which could only conceive of two possible modern industrialized social formations – either capitalism or a progressive socialist society. Instead, Arato, along with a number of East European theorists, sought to analyze state socialist societies as a new, hierarchical, exploitative social formation “sui generis”; he understood the communist societies as a unique social formation with its own particular mechanisms of control, exploitation and crisis. Arato argued that this type of society could not be understood by focusing on market or economic relations; instead, it rested on a type of prerogative political control operating through the bureaucratic state.

Arato's essays were collected in the 1993 volume From Neo-Marxism to Democratic Theory: Essays on the Critical Theory of Soviet-Type Societies. Despite the richness of his efforts, Arato saw little connection between his exercises in social system analysis and active social movements aiming to transform state socialism. Indeed, he noted that his type of structural analysis blocked perception of what was new about the rising social movements in Eastern Europe and most especially Poland's Solidarność, which emerged in 1980. In the late 1980s, Arato “disengaged” with his project of developing a critical theory of authoritarian socialism for a theory that seemed to better capture what was new and essential about the rising social movements and oppositions in Eastern Europe, while also offering a powerful tool to criticize the inadequacies of Western capitalist democracies, that is, the theory of civil society.

This transition, where Arato left his work to the gnawing criticism of mice (to repeat Marx's quip), paralleled similar shifts among East European critical intellectuals. But at the same time, this turn could be said to reflect intrinsic limits to his original project. Arato noted that abstract (ideal typical) models of social system dynamics often failed to incorporate considerations of national histories and cultural traditions, along with inherited social institutions. And, it is precisely those contested national cultural traditions that form the symbolic resources for movements opposing the authoritarian socialist state (and also, in contrast, legitimating the rule of the communist state).

Furthermore, such analyses of systems reproduction (dissecting the dynamics and instrumental logics of state and markets) typically ignores the normative and institutionalized categories of the lifeworld and civil society that might support an autonomous social domain of solidarity and open public communication, which is also the terrain of social movements.

=== Third stage: Civil society (1981–1989) ===
It is precisely to these ideal spaces and rights of social autonomy separate from the state, or civil society, that Arato shifted in his third stage. Such a change in intellectual direction was clearly sparked by rising opposition movement of Solidarność in the exciting developments in Poland in 1980–81, resulting in Arato's early articulation of the category of civil society in his oft-cited 1981 essay “Civil Society vs. the State: Poland 1980-1981.”

By civil society, Arato (and writers in Poland, Hungary, but also France and South America) meant a social space outside state or corporate control where groups and individuals could engage in something approximating free association and communication among equals. This social space ideally entailed whole sets of laws, rights, and institutions to help secure individual autonomy and public freedom.

In civil society's fully developed modern form, Arato wrote, such a realm is protected by legal rights, possesses channels to influence the separate institutions of economy and state, and has a developed organizational life and media organizations to enhance social communication and strengthen social relations. Nowhere were all these requirements fully met and the ideal of civil society thus offered a basis for social movements seeking to enrich and extend its ideals everywhere.

For Arato, this new focus on civil society constituted, in part, a rejection of the traditional Marxian problematic for a post-Marxist one. He and intellectuals in Eastern Europe criticized Marx's advocacy of a radical democratic reunification of state and society in a supposedly collective free social order. They rejected Marx's idea of ending of the distinction of state and society (or state and market), along with his conception of an unalienated collective subject, totally undivided and in control of itself. The experience of Eastern Europe and Russia suggested this utopian merging of government and society inevitably resulted in authoritarian forms of rule. It resulted either in the loss of independent freedom of civil society under the embracing control of the party-state or else it saw regression in economic rationality as the community or state subjected the economy to their traditional norms and political calculations.

Instead, partly for normative reasons and partly for strategic reasons (to prevent repression from the state or USSR invasion), opposition movements in Eastern Europe (and throughout the world) sought not to take over the government but only to strengthen the forms of freedom in a modern civil society, that is, forms of solidarity, free communicative interaction, and active democratic participation in autonomous publics and a plurality of associations. The goal—Arato argued for Eastern Europe, but soon extended this model to the West—should be the protection and indeed the strengthening of civil society and its democratization and institution building separate from the strategic instrumental logics and power hierarchies of the state and capitalist economy. In collaboration with Jean Cohen, Arato concluded that “the idea of the reconstruction and democratization of civil society could become the foundation of a critical theory of all modern societies, including the West.”

In the late 1970s into the 1980s and beyond, the problematic of civil society spread across Europe, Latin America, and Asia as a powerful theory and ideal that could guide social movements in obtainable advances in freedom. “For better or worse,” Arato noted, “Jean Cohen and myself led the discussion [of civil society] in the United States.”

Here too Arato drew heavily on the work of Habermas, especially Habermas's book on the rise and decline of the public sphere. Arato noted that Habermas's writings had a “uniquely important role in the rediscovery, critique and reconstruction of the early modern concept of civil society.” But in addition, Habermas's later social theory articulated an ideal model of modern society's “differentiated” structure and the need to defend the separate institutions of communicative social interaction and the cultural traditions proper to the lifeworld. Furthermore, Habermas's theory suggested to a tripartite model of society, where civil society was the institutional structure of society's cultural lifeworld and was opposed to the strategic and instrumental rationality embodied in the economy and state. With this three-part model of ideal social organization — state, economy and civil society — Arato could make the idea of civil society and its strengthening a critical tool in Western capitalist societies.

Between his initial 1981 and 1982 articles on Poland and civil society, a full decade passed before he and Jean Cohen issued their magnum opus: Civil Society and Political Theory. Despite its late publication and its intimidating size at 794 pages, the volume quickly became popular. In October 2010, Google Scholar listed over 2,600 publications citing the book. During this time, Arato remained associated with the radical journal Telos. However, the relevance and vitality of the category of civil society for the West became an object for vigorous dispute at Telos, most especially by Paul Piccone, the journal's pugnacious editor. Piccone elaborated his own perspective under the rubric of “artificial negativity,” a theory that failed to see any autonomous cultural dynamics in the current U.S. civil society outside of the state's manipulation and control of a supposedly atomized, narcissistic population of consumers. In the ensuing debates, Arato and Cohen ended their long association with the journal in 1987.

=== Fourth stage: Constitution making (1989–present) ===
1989 was an epochal year in world history, with the liberation of East European countries from Soviet dominance, the transformation of the USSR, and negotiated transformations of the governments and constitutions of Eastern Europe in 1989–90.

The unique nature of the transitions and the powerful intellectual and political issues of writing a new constitution soon became Arato's prime target of intellectual investigation. He closely followed the political debate surrounding the drafting of constitutions in Hungary, where he maintained continued with such critical intellectuals as Janos Kis, co-founder and first chair of the Alliance of Free Democrats, Hungary's liberal party until 1991. In 1996–97, Arato served as a consultant for the Hungarian Parliament on constitutional issues. In the ensuing years, he published commentary and analysis of constitutional issues in Nepal, Turkey, South Africa and Iraq after the U.S. invasion of that nation in 2003. His analysis of the creation of a new constitution in Iraq resulted in his 2009 book: Constitution Making under Occupation: The Politics of Imposed Revolution in Iraq.

Arato elaborated a theory of “post-sovereign” constitution making, which he considered a key political innovation occasioned by the construction of negotiated transitions from dictatorship to new democratic constitutions in Eastern Europe, but also in South Africa, Spain and other countries. He believed that this particular form of constitution making had pronounced advantages politically and normatively over the traditional model. He declared, “1989 did produce something dramatically new: a political paradigm of radical transformation ..., yielding a historically new, superior model of constitutional creation beyond the revolutionary democratic European models.”

According to Arato, the post-sovereign model typically entailed a two-stage process of transition from dictatorship to constitutional democracy. (I) First were initial roundtable negotiations with the power holders and all significant social voices. This negotiation established the ground rules for the subsequent stage, (II) where an elected assembly wrote the new constitution. A constitutional court gave significant oversight to the process, ensuring that the constitutional assembly abided by the ground rules of the roundtable. Ideally, Arato argued, the process should be characterized by broad social inclusion, equality, transparency and publicity.

By "post sovereignty," Arato meant that the creation of the constitution abandoned the mythology that it was being issued by the people themselves as ultimate sovereign authority, speaking directly in an unmediated form. Such a mythology, Arato said, often had authoritarian consequences, resulting in a leader or party claiming to represent the people without needing any special limits or rights to ensure that the populace could actually have a voice in political decision-making. Such a process, besides remedying past deficiencies, would also address the conundrum of political legitimacy outlined by thinkers such as Jacques Derrida and Giorgio Agamben, who noted that democracies always contained an undemocratic, illegitimate, arbitrary, even violent moment in their founding.

== Publications ==
- The Essential Frankfurt School Reader. Edited with E. Gebhardt. 1978.
- The Young Lukács and the Origins of Western Marxism. Co-authored with P. Breines. 1979.
- Civil Society and Political Theory. Co-authored with J. Cohen. 1992.
- From Neo-Marxism to Democratic Theory: Essays. 1993.
- Habermas on Law and Democracy: Critical Exchanges. Edited with M. Rosenfeld. 1998.
- Civil Society, Constitution and Legitimacy. 1999.
- Constitution Making Under Occupation: The Politics of Imposed Revolution in Iraq. 2009
- Post Sovereign Constitution Making: Learning and Legitimacy (Oxford University Press, 2016)
- Adventures of the Constituent Power (Cambridge University Press, 2017)
- Populism and Civil Society: The Challenge to Constitutional Democracy. Co-authored with J. Cohen. 2021.
