= Nikulin (surname) =

Nikulin, feminine: Nikulina is a Russian surname. Notable people with the surname include:

- Aleksandr Semyonovich Nikulin (1918–1998), Soviet and Russian pilot, and Hero of the Russian Federation
- Aleksandr Nikulin (footballer, born 1979), Russian footballer
- Aleksandr Yevgenyevich Nikulin (born 1985), Russian footballer
- Alexander Nikulin (ice hockey) (born 1985), Russian hockey player
- Aleksandr Nikulin (judge), Donesk Republic judge
- Anatoly Nikulin (1923–1996), Russian pharmacologist and apitherapist
- Anna Nikulina (born 1985), Russian ballet dancer
- Dmitri Nikulin (born 1962), American philosopher
- Grigory Nikulin (1895–1965), Russian Bolshevik revolutionary
- Igor Nikulin (hammer thrower) (born 1960), Russian hammer thrower
- Igor Nikulin (ice hockey) (born 1972), Russian ice hockey player
- Ilya Nikulin (born 1982), Russian ice hockey player
- Ina Nikulina, Belarusian rower
- Ivan Nikulin
- Ivan Nikulin (politician) (1936–2026), Russian politician
- Lyubov Nikulina-Kositskaya
- Marina Nikulina, birth name of Marina Pankova (1963–2015), Russian volleyball player
- Oleg Nikulin, Russian footballer
- Sergei Nikulin (born 1951), Soviet footballer and Russian coach
- Valentin Nikulin, Soviet-born actor
- Viacheslav V. Nikulin, Russian mathematician
- Yegor Nikulin, Russian footballer
- Yevdokiya Nikulina (1917–1993), Soviet pilot and Hero of the Soviet Union
- Yevgeniy Nikulin (born 1987), Russian computer hacker
- Yuri Nikulin (1921–1997), Soviet and Russian actor and clown
