= György Márkus =

Hungarian philosopher (1934–2016)

- Born: 13 April 1934; Budapest, Hungary
- Died: 5 October 2016 (aged 82); Sydney, Australia
- Other name: George Márkus

Education
- Education: Moscow University
- Doctoral advisor: Wilfrid Sellars
- Other advisor: György Lukács

Philosophical work
- Era: 20th-century philosophy
- Region: Western philosophy
- School: Continental philosophy Budapest School; Critical theory
- Institutions: Eötvös Loránd University; Hungarian Academy of Sciences; Free University of Berlin; University of Sydney; Central European University
- Doctoral students: Paul Redding
- Main interests: Philosophical anthropology, philosophy of culture, aesthetics, history of philosophy
- Notable ideas: Criticism of the Marxist technicist paradigm of production Constitution of cultural modernity

György Márkus (also George Márkus; 13 April 1934 – 5 October 2016) was a Hungarian philosopher, belonging to the small circle of critical theorists closely associated with György Lukács and usually referred to as the Budapest School.

== Biography ==
Márkus was born in Budapest in 1934 and survived the Holocaust as a young boy. After the war and the final victory of the Communist government of Hungary, he was sent to complete his philosophical training at Lomonosov University in Moscow from 1953 until 1957. There he met his future wife Maria Márkus who was also studying philosophy. They had their first of two sons, György (Gyuri), in 1956 and Andras two years later in Budapest, where they returned in 1957 shortly after the Hungarian Revolution and where he taught until 1965.

From 1960, he joined a small group of like-minded philosophers established around the internationally renowned Marxist philosopher György Lukács who in his last period founded a programme based on the ‘Renaissance of Marx’. This project was to resurrect the original emancipatory meaning of Marx's works and demonstrate their contemporary relevance. Other notable members of this group included Ágnes Heller, Ferenc Fehér, István Mészáros, Mihály Vajda, György's wife Maria Márkus and later his students György Bence and János Kis. As a specialist in analytical English and American philosophy, Márkus wrote his dissertation on Wittgenstein's Tractatus Logico-Philosophicus, which he had previously translated into Hungarian for the first time, and spent 1965–1966 at the University of Pittsburgh in the United States supervised by Wilfrid Sellars and Willard V. O. Quine. Márkus received the Academy Prize of the Philosophy and Humanities Section of the Hungarian Academy of Sciences in 1966. By this time Márkus could speak Russian, English, German, Polish, French and Latin aside from his native Hungarian.

Lukács’ death in 1971 deprived the members of the 'Budapest School' of the degree of protection he had been able to offer against an increasingly hostile regime, and in 1973 the Communist Party officially condemned their work and some of the members of the group were dismissed from their academic positions. In solidarity, Markus resigned from his post. Márkus was dismissed from the Hungarian Academy of Sciences and banned from teaching and his two sons suffered discrimination with regard to their schooling.

In 1977, György and Maria Márkus, along with Heller and Fehér, decided to leave Hungary and by 1978 all four had settled in Australia, where Márkus had been offered an appointment in the Department of General Philosophy at the University of Sydney. Over the next two decades, he taught across a range of areas including history of philosophy, critical theory, and aesthetics. He was awarded a personal chair in 1996 and retired in 1998.

Following political liberalisation in Hungary, Markus was allowed to return, but he did so only occasionally and remained resident in Sydney. He rejoined the Hungarian Academy of Sciences as an external member in 1990, and was elected to the Australian Academy of the Humanities in 1999. He was also on the editorial board of the academic journal Thesis Eleven: Critical Theory and Historical Sociology.

== Works and philosophy ==
Markus's publishing record is fragmented in comparison to other leading members of the Budapest School like Heller. Several of his earlier works in Hungarian have not been translated into English. He often published in smaller journals and usually only when asked by editors.

The first publication that brought international attention to Markus was his Marxism and Anthropology (1978), originally published in Hungarian in 1965 and translated later into Spanish, Japanese, Italian, English and German. Dictatorship over Needs: An Analysis of Soviet Societies (1983), written together with Fehér and Heller, gave expression to the Budapest School's earlier critique of life in the Soviet Union and its Eastern European satellites. Another influential book from this period was published in its English version as Language and Production: A Critique of the Paradigms (1986). His long-standing ambition was to prepare a work on the theory of cultural autonomy in modernity. Although he was unable to complete this project, a number of his later essays on this theme were collected by John Grumley and presented in Culture, Science and Society: Constitution of Cultural Modernity (2013). A further selection of essays comprising his Nachlass is forthcoming, edited and with an introduction by Harriet Johnson.

Although there is a clear internal consistency in Markus's output, his interests can be organised chronologically according to three main phases. His first period was concerned with fleshing out a ‘humanist’ Marxism, and saw Markus exploring the idea of a normative philosophical anthropology that could guide this theoretical project - an anthropology that was still largely based on a theory of evolving needs articulated through a more or less traditional Marxist view of historical development.

The second period is marked by a more critical standpoint on Marx and a special focus on the methodological limitations of the orthodox Marxian paradigm of labour. Markus also begins to look to the early Marx (rather than a later teleological theory of history) for the normative underpinnings of his philosophical anthropology. Markus also begins in this period to engage more with non-Marxist theorists like Hans-Georg Gadamer, Leo Strauss as well as renewing his interest in Wittgenstein. Here the extensive scope of Márkus’ grasp of developments in the wider philosophical world allowed him to engage critically with the variety of ways in which ‘language paradigm’ had gained ascendancy in twentieth-century humanistic studies. Márkus argued against this linguistic model, advocating a view of culture as a type of productive process better understood along (expanded) Marxist lines.

The third and final period is even more critical of the narrow Marxist technicist paradigm of production. Via a critique of Habermas’ communicative turn, he argues that the legacy of this paradigm had prevented the critical theoretical tradition from giving a sufficiently rich account of the subject's concrete interactions with nature as also a thoroughly social process. Habermas had also recognised the normative deficit of this paradigm but largely abandoned it altogether, opting instead - in a Kantian twist - for an idealised, transcendental perspective extracted from the conditions of linguistic interaction. For Markus, this change of perspective leaves the tradition with, on the one hand, a frozen and idealised form of rationality, and on the other hand, a reductive and purely instrumental idea of historical development. Markus remained committed, for the remainder of his working life, to the idea that a non-reductive paradigm of production could ground a theory of culture, a ‘unified’ theory of social normativity and emancipatory political action.

== Prizes ==
- Academy Prize of the Philosophy and Humanities Section of the MTA (Hungarian Academy of Sciences), 1966
- Lukács György Prize 2005

== Selected publications ==
- Marxizmus és „antropológia”. Az emberi lényeg fogalma Marx filozófiájában, 1966 (Marxism and Anthropology, 1978)
- Irányzatok a mai polgári filozófiában, 1972, together with Zádor Tordai
- Hogyan lehetséges kritikai gazdaságtan?, 1973, together with György Bence and János Kis
- Diktatúra a szükségletek felett, with Ferenc Feher and Agnes Heller, 1983 (Dictatorship Over Needs, 1983)
- Why is there no hermeneutics of natural sciences? Some preliminary theses. Science in Context 1987;1:5-51 (pdf)
- Kultúra és modernitás. Hermeneutikai kísérletek, 1992
- Metafizika – mi végre?, 1998
- “The Soul and Life: The Young Lukács and the Problem of Culture”. Telos 32
- Language et production, 1982 (Language and production: A critique of the paradigms, 1986)
- "A Society of Culture: The constitution of modernity" in Rethinking Imagination, 1994
- Culture, Science, Society: The Constitution of Cultural Modernity, 2013. Edited by John Grumley
- Is a Critical Economics Possible? with Janos Kis and György Bence, 2021. Edited by John Grumley
- Critical Theory, Radical Historicism, Science: The Contemporary György Markus, 2021. Edited and Introduced by John Grumley and Harriet Johnson
