= Constellations (journal) =

Academic journal

- Discipline: Critical and Democratic Theory
- Language: English
- Edited by: Simone Chambers, Cristina Lafont, Hubertus Buchstein

Publication details
- History: 1994-present
- Publisher: Wiley-Blackwell
- Frequency: Quarterly

Standard abbreviations
- ISO 4: Constellations

Indexing
- CODEN: CNSTES
- ISSN: 1351-0487 (print); 1467-8675 (web)
- LCCN: 94646452
- OCLC no.: 30590774

Links
- Journal homepage; Online access; Online archive

Constellations: An International Journal of Critical and Democratic Theory, commonly known as Constellations, is a quarterly peer-reviewed academic journal of critical post-Marxist and democratic theory and successor of Praxis International.

Constellations is committed to publishing the best of contemporary critical theory and democratic theory in philosophy, politics, social theory, and law. The journal aims to expanding the global possibilities for radical politics and social criticism.

== Editorial team ==
Nadia Urbinati, Amy Allen, Jean L.Cohen, and Andreas Kalyvas are former co-editors. It is currently edited by Simone Chambers, Cristina Lafont, and Hubertus Buchstein. Ertug Tombus is the managing editor of the journal since 2009. Seyla Benhabib, Nancy Fraser and Andrew Arato are the co-founding former editors. With an international editorial contribution, it is based at the New School in New York.

== See also ==
- List of sociology journals
- List of philosophy journals
- List of political science journals
- Thesis Eleven: Critical Theory and Historical Sociology
