= EUI =

EUI may refer to:

- Electronically controlled unit injector
- Energy use intensity
- European unemployment insurance
- European University Institute, in Florence, Italy
- Extended Unique Identifier
- Europa Universalis, the first instalment within the Europa Universalis video game series
