= Sava Babić =

Serbian writer

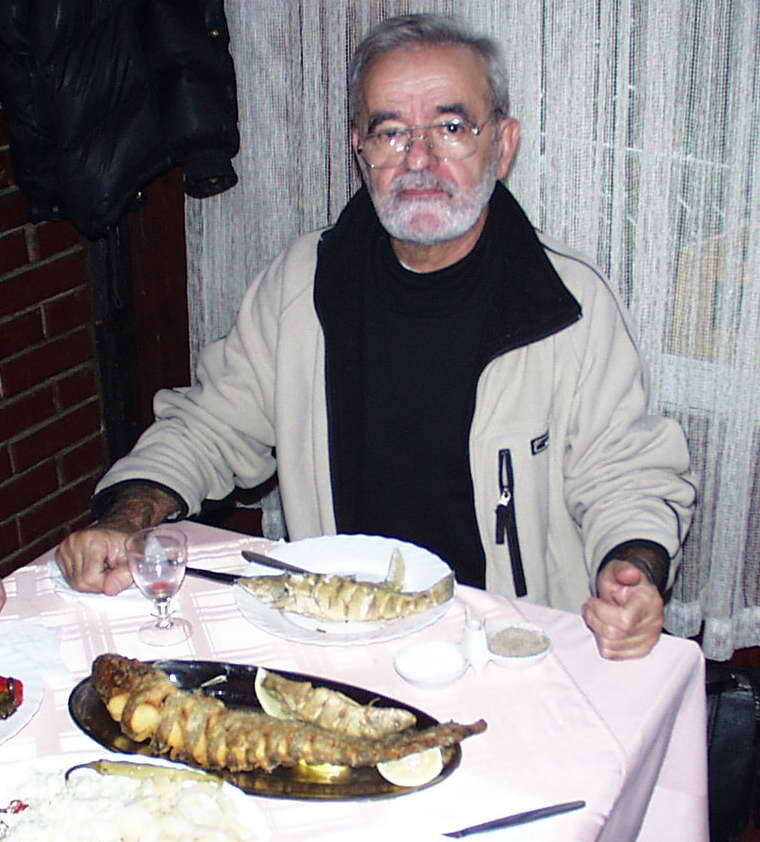

Sava Babić (Cyrillic: Сaвa Бaбић, Palić, January 27, 1934–Beograd, November 23, 2012), was a Serbian writer, poet, translator and university professor.

== His life ==
Sava Babić's parents arrived in Vojvodina from Hercegovina. From the autumn of 1941, he studied at a Hungarian school. He finished high school in Subotica. In 1953, he passed the school-leaving exam and studied Yugoslav literature at the University of Belgrade. He worked for several publishing houses and cultural institutions. Since 1974, he taught at the universities of Novi Sad, then Belgrade, where in 1993, he founded the Department of Hungarian Language and Literature and worked as its head till 1999, when he retired. In 2007, he received the Golden Cross of Merit of Hungary. Babić is also an honorary citizen of Balatonfüred.
His first translation was a novel by Tibor Cseres: Hideg napok. It was an important gesture of reconciliation between Serbs and Hungarians because Cseres's book describes Hungarian war criminals reminiscing in judicial custody about their crimes and killings of the non-Hungarian population in 1942 raids in southern Bačka.

Babić also translated the works of Sándor Petőfi, István Örkény, Miklós Hubay, Gyula Illyés, Tibor Déry, Gyula Krúdy, István Eörsi, Sándor Weöres, Ádám Bodor, Lajos Szabó, Ottó Tolnai and Péter Esterházy.
He also translated all the books of Béla Hamvas. Some works of Hamvas were published in the Serbian language before the Hungarian edition.
Babić recently translated some works of Imre Madách and Sándor Márai, but these translations have not been published yet.

== His works ==
- Na dlanu, Osvit, Subotica, 1971.
- Neuspeo pokušaj de se tarabe obore, Stražilovo, Novi Sad, 1978.
- U senci knjige, Stražilovo, Novi Sad, 1981.
- Kako smo prevodili Petefija, Matica Srpska, Novi Sad, 1985.
- Razabrati u pletivu, Novi Sad, 1986.
- Preveseji, Institut za južnoslovenske jezike, Novi Sad, 1989.
- Ljubavni jadi mladog filozofa Đerđa Lukača, Tvoračka radionica, Beograd, 1990.
- Pet više pet, Dnevnik, Novi Sad, 1990.
- Mađarska Civilizacija, Centar za geopoetiku, Beograd, 1996.
- Bokorje Danila Kiša, Umetnička Radionica, Kanjiža, 1998.
- Granice isčezavarju, zar ne?, Slobodan Mašić, Beograd, 1999.
- Hamvas hárs, Művészetek háza, Veszprém, 1999.
- Milorad Pavić mora pričati priče, Beograd, 1999.
- Milorad Pavić mora pričati priče, Stylos, Novi Sad, 2000.

== Translations ==
- Bán Imre, Barta János, Czine Mihály: A magyar irodalom története (1976)
- Bodor Ádám: Sinistra-körzet (2000)
- Csáth Géza: Novellák és napló (1991)
- Cseres Tibor: Hideg napok (1966)
- Déry Tibor: Szerelem (1979)
- Déry Tibor: Kedves bópeer! (1989)
- Déry Tibor: Félfülű (1991)
- Eörsi István: Fogadás (1986)
- Eörsi István: Kihallgatás (1987)
- Eörsi István: Keringő a valósággal (1989)
- Eörsi István: Emlékezés a régi szép időkre (1990)
- Esterházy Péter: Hrabal könyve
- Esterházy Péter: A halacska csodálatos élete (2002)
- Esterházy Péter: Harmonia Celestis (2003)
- Fehér Kálmán: Januári borostyán (1974)
- Fehér Kálmán: Pannónia (1984)
- Gál László: Mégis (1974)
- Göncz Árpád: Elbeszélések és drámák (1992)
- Hamvas Béla: Hyperion (1993)
- Hamvas Béla: Scientia sacra I. (1994)
- Hamvas Béla: Patmosz I-III (1994)
- Hamvas Béla: Gond az életről (Babérligetkönyv, Világválság, Száz könyv, A bor filozófiája, Titkos jegyzőkönyv, Unicornis) (1994)
- Hamvas Béla: Silentium (1994)
- Hamvas Béla: Ugyanis (1994)
- Hamvas Béla: Haxakümenion (1994)
- Hamvas Béla: Mágia szutra (1995)
- Hamvas Béla: Arkhai (1996)
- Hamvas Béla: Óda a XX. századhoz (1996)
- Hamvas Béla: Tabula smaragdina (1996)
- Hamvas Béla: A láthatatlan történet (1996)
- Hamvas Béla: Regényelméleti fragmentum (1996)
- Hamvas Béla: Az öt géniusz (1996)
- Hamvas Béla: Szilveszter (1996)
- Hamvas Béla: Szarepta (1999)
- Hamvas Béla: Scientia sacra I-II (1999)
- Hamvas Béla: Karnevál I-III (1999)
- Hamvas Béla: Karnevál IV-VIII (2000)
- Hamvas Béla: A bor filozófiája (2000)
- Hamvas Béla: Bizonyos tekintetben (2000)
- Hamvas Béla: Ugyanis (2000)
- Hamvas Béla: Szilveszter (2000)
- Hamvas Béla: Anthologia humana (2001)
- Hamvas Béla: Reči i damari (Válogatás Hamvas bölcseletéből) (2002)
- Heller Ágnes: Szilveszteri symposion (1986)
- Hubay Miklós: Analízis (1975)
- Illyés Gyula: Ditirambus a nőkhöz (1975)
- Illyés Gyula: Kháron ladikján (1988)
- Kopeczky László: A ház (1971)
- Kosztolányi Dezső: Esti Kornél (1999)
- Lukács György: A modern dráma fejlődésének története (1978)
- Lukács György: Ifjúkori művek (1982)
- Lukács György: Intim dráma (1985)
- Lukács György-Eörsi István: Életrajz magnószalagon (1986)
- Majtényi Mihály: A száműzött (1975)
- Majtényi Mihály: Élő víz (1975)
- Oravecz Imre: Halászóember (2000)
- Örkény István: Macskajáték (1973)
- Pap József: Sebzett szárny (1975)
- Popper Leó: Esszék és kritikák (1989)
- Róheim Géza: Csurunga népe (1994)
- Sáfrány Imre: Menetelés (1971)
- Sánta Ferenc: Ötödik pecsét (1988)
- Szabó Lajos: Theocentrikus logika (1999)
- Szeli István: Székács József és műve (1986)
- Tolnai Ottó: Versek (1990)
- Weöres Sándor: A teljesség felé (2000)
- Szerelem magyar módra (Magyar elbeszélések, 1998)
- Az ember, az asszony és a bűn (Magyar írók biblikus írásai, 2000)
