= Aleksandr Nikulin =

Aleksandr Nikulin may refer to:

- Aleksandr Semyonovich Nikulin (1918–1998), Soviet and Russian pilot, and Hero of the Russian Federation
- Aleksandr Nikulin (footballer, born 1979), Russian footballer
- Aleksandr Nikulin (footballer, born 1985) (born 1985), Russian footballer
- Alexander Nikulin (ice hockey) (born 1985), Russian hockey player
- Aleksandr Nikulin (judge), Donesk Republic judge
