= Peter Beilharz =

Australian sociologist

Peter Beilharz (born 13 November 1953) is an Australian sociologist. He is professor of critical theory at Sichuan University, Chengdu, PRC. Previously he was professor of sociology and remains Emeritus Professor at La Trobe University, Melbourne. He is adjunct professor at Curtin University, Perth, Western Australia. Beilharz is founding editor of the international journal of social theory Thesis Eleven published by Sage.

From 2002 to 2014, he was the director of the Thesis Eleven Centre for Cultural Sociology at La Trobe University. He is best known for his work in social theory and socialism, for his intellectual biography of the Australian art historian Bernard Smith, and his several books on the eminent Polish sociologist Zygmunt Bauman.

== Biography ==
Beilharz was born on 13 November 1953 in Melbourne, Australia. He attended Croydon High School and Rusden College. After a short experience of teaching at high school he went to Monash University, where he completed a doctorate on Trotskyism in 1984. He taught at Monash University, RMIT, and Melbourne University before replacing Ágnes Heller at La Trobe in 1988, where he progressed from lecturer through to personal chair in 1999.

In the course of his travels, he has visited Manila, Amsterdam, Chapel Hill, North Carolina, Mexico City, São Paulo, and Tokyo and a visiting fellow at Research School of Social Sciences, Australian National University. He was the William Dean Howells Fellow at Harvard Library in 2002. He is a Faculty Associate in the Sociology Department at Yale, and a visiting professor at the Bauman Institute, Leeds University.

Beilharz has written or edited thirty books, including Labour's Utopias (1992), Postmodern Socialism (1994), Transforming Labor (1994), Imagining the Antipodes (1997) and Zygmunt Bauman – Dialectic of Modernity (2002) and 200 papers. He has written on the social transformation of ideology within Americanism.

== Accomplishments ==
- He was elected a Fellow of the Academy of Social Sciences in Australia in 1997.
- From 1999–2000 he was the Harvard Chair of Australian Studies, Harvard University.

== Bibliography ==
- Beilharz, P. (1979) "Trotsky's Marxism-Permanent Involution?" Telos 39, Spring 1979.
- Beilharz, P. (1987) Trotsky, Trotskyism and the Transition to Socialism, London, Croom Helm; New Jersey, Rowman and Littlefield. ISBN 978-0-389-20698-9
- Beilharz, P. (1992) Labour's Utopias: Bolshevisims, Fabianism, Social Democracy, London and New York, Routledge paperback, 1993. ISBN 0-415-06616-6
- Beilharz, P. (1992) Arguing About the Welfare State: the Australian Experience, Sydney, Allen and Unwin, co-authored with M. Considine and R. Watts. ISBN 1-86373-096-6
- Beilharz, P. (1992) Social Theory: A Guide to Central Thinkers, Editor, Sydney, Allen and Unwin. ISBN 1-86373-163-6
- Beilharz, P. (1992) Between Totalitarianism and Postmodernity, co-edited with G. Robinson and J. Rundell, Boston, MIT. ISBN 0-262-52179-2
- Beilharz, P. (1994) Transforming Labor: Labour Tradition and the Labor Decade, Sydney, Cambridge University Press. ISBN 0-521-43237-5
- Beilharz, P. (1994) Postmodern Socialism: Romanticism, City and State, Melbourne, Melbourne University Press. ISBN 0-522-84535-5
- Beilharz, P. (1997) Imagining the Antipodes: Culture, Theory and the Visual in the Work of Bernard Smith, Melbourne, Cambridge University Press. ISBN 0-521-58355-1
- Beilharz, P. (1998) Fabianism and Feminism, co-edited with C. Nyland, Aldershot, Ashgate. ISBN 1-84014-307-X
- Beilharz, P. (2000) Zygmunt Bauman – Dialectic of Modernity, Sage Publications, London, California, New Delhi. ISBN 0-7619-6734-6
- Beilharz, P. (ed.) (2001) The Bauman Reader, Blackwell, Oxford, Boston. ISBN 0-631-21491-7
- Beilharz, P. (ed.) (2002) Zygmunt Bauman – Masters of Social Thought, 4 vols., London, California, New Delhi, Sage Publications. ISBN 0-7619-7127-0
- Beilharz, P. and Hogan, T. (eds) (2002) Social Self, Global Culture: An Introduction to Sociological Ideas, 2nd ed., Oxford University Press, Melbourne. ISBN 0-19-551572-2
- Beilharz, P. (ed.) (2005) Postwar American Critical Thought, 4 vols., London, California, New Delhi, Sage. ISBN 978-0-7619-4415-7
- Beilharz, P. and Hogan, T. (eds) (2006) Sociology – Place, Time and Division, Oxford University Press. ISBN 978-0-19-555097-9
- Beilharz, P. and Manne, R. (eds) (2006) Reflected Light: La Trobe Essays, Melbourne, Black Inc. ISBN 978-1-86395-246-0
- Beilharz, P. (2009) Socialism and Modernity, Minneapolis, University of Minnesota Press, ISBN 978-0-8166-6086-5
- Beilharz, P. (2015) Thinking the Antipodes: Australian Essays, Melbourne, Monash University Publishing, ISBN 978-1-922235-55-8
- Beilharz, P., Hogan, T. and Shaver, S. (2015) The Martin Presence: Jean Martin and the Making of the Social Sciences in Australia, Sydney, UNSW Press, ISBN 9781742232164
- Beilharz, P. (2020) Circling Marx: Essays 1980-2020, Leiden, Brill, ISBN 978-90-04-32171-7
- Beilharz, P. (2020) Intimacy in Postmodern Times: A Friendship with Zygmunt Bauman, Manchester, Manchester University Press, ISBN 978-1-5261-3215-4
- Beilharz, Peter & Sian Supski, eds. (2022). The work of history : writing for Stuart Macintyre. Melbourne University Press.
