= Ágnes Heller =

Hungarian philosopher, teacher (1929–2019)

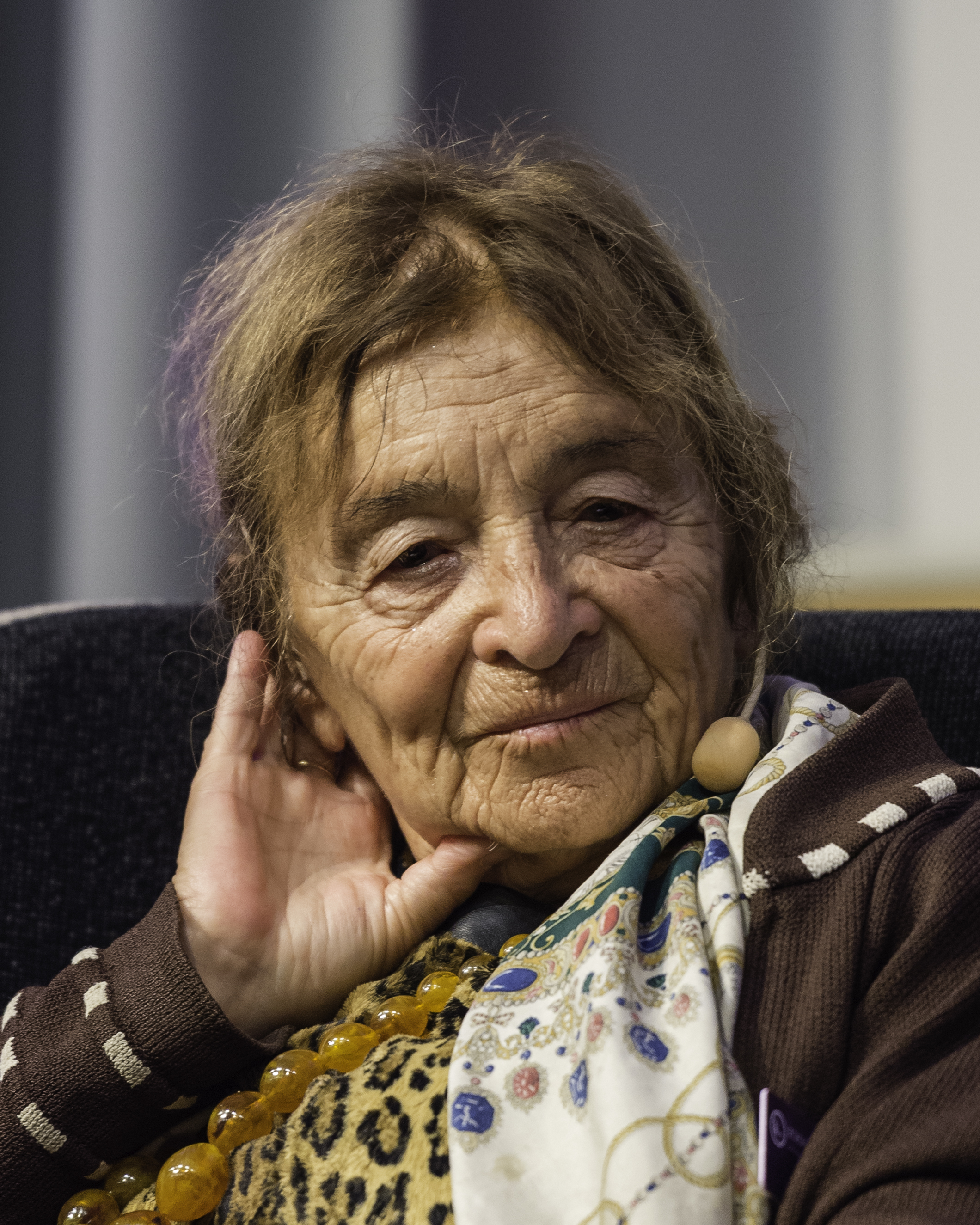
- Heller in 2015
- Born: 12 May 1929; Budapest, Kingdom of Hungary
- Died: 19 July 2019 (aged 90); Balatonalmádi, Hungary
- Spouses: István Hermann (m. 1949; div. 1962); Ferenc Fehér (m. 1963; died 1994)

Education
- Doctoral advisor: György Lukács

Philosophical work
- Era: Contemporary philosophy
- Region: Western philosophy
- School: Continental philosophy Budapest School
- Institutions: Eötvös Loránd University; Hungarian Academy of Sciences; La Trobe University; The New School; University of Szeged
- Main interests: Political philosophy
- Notable ideas: Revolution in everyday life, ethics of personality

Ágnes Heller (12 May 1929 – 19 July 2019) was a Hungarian philosopher and lecturer. She was a core member of the Budapest School philosophical forum in the 1960s and later taught political theory for 25 years at the New School for Social Research in New York City. She lived, wrote and lectured in Budapest.

== Early life and political development ==
Ágnes Heller was born on 12 May 1929, to Pál Heller and Angéla "Angyalka" Ligeti. They were a middle-class Jewish family. During World War II her father used his legal training and knowledge of German to help people get the necessary paperwork to emigrate from Nazi Europe. In 1944, Heller's father was deported to the Auschwitz concentration camp where he died before the war ended. Heller and her mother managed to avoid deportation.

With regard to the influence of the Holocaust on her work, Heller said:

I was always interested in the question: How could this possibly happen? How can I understand this? And this experience of the holocaust was joined with my experience in the totalitarian regime. This brought up very similar questions in my soul-search and world investigation: how could this happen? How could people do things like this? So I had to find out what morality is all about, what is the nature of good and evil, what can I do about crime, what can I figure out about the sources of morality and evil? That was the first inquiry. The other inquiry was a social question: what kind of world can produce this? What kind of world allows such things to happen? What is modernity all about? Can we expect redemption?

In 1947, Heller began to study physics and chemistry at the University of Budapest. She changed her focus to philosophy, however, when her boyfriend at the time urged her to listen to the lecture of the philosopher György Lukács, on the intersections of philosophy and culture. She was immediately taken by how much his lecture addressed her concerns and interests in how to live in the modern world, especially after the experience of World War II and the Holocaust.

Heller joined the Communist Party that year, 1947, while at a Zionist work camp and began to develop her interest in Marxism. However, she felt that the Party was stifling the ability of its adherents to think freely due to its adherence to democratic centralism. She was expelled from it for the first time in 1949, the year that Mátyás Rákosi came into power and ushered in the years of Stalinist rule.

== Scientific work ==
=== Early career in Hungary ===
After 1953 and the installation of Imre Nagy as Prime Minister, Heller was able to safely undertake her doctoral studies under the supervision of Lukács, and in 1955 she began to teach at the Faculty of Humanities of the University of Budapest.

=== From the Hungarian Revolution of 1956 to the Prague Spring of 1968 ===
The 1956 Hungarian Revolution was the most important political event of her life, for at this time she saw the effect of the academic freedoms of Marxist critical theory as dangerous to the entire political and social structure of Hungary. Heller saw the uprising as confirming her ideas that what Marx really means for the people is to have political autonomy and collective determination of social life.

Lukács, Heller and other critical theorists emerged from the Revolution with the belief that Marxism and socialism needed to be applied to different nations in individual ways, effectively questioning the role of the Soviet Union in Hungary's future. These ideas set Heller on an ideological collision course with the new Moscow-supported government of János Kádár: Heller was again expelled from the Communist Party and she was dismissed from the university in 1958 for refusing to indict Lukács as a collaborator in the Revolution. She was not able to resume her research until 1963, when she was invited to join the Sociological Institute at the Hungarian Academy as a researcher (Tormey 4–18) (Grumley 5–15).

From 1963, the emergence of what would later be called the "Budapest School" can be seen: a philosophical forum that was formed by Lukács to promote the renewal of Marxist criticism in the face of practiced and theoretical socialism. Other participants in the Budapest School included, together with Heller, her second husband Ferenc Fehér, György Márkus, Mihály Vajda and some other scholars with a looser connection to the school (such as András Hegedüs, István Eörsi, János Kis and György Bence).

Heller's work from this period concentrated on themes such as what Marx means by the character of modern societies; liberation theory as applied to the individual; the work of changing society and government from "the bottom up," and affecting change through the level of the values, beliefs and customs of "everyday life".

=== Career in Hungary after the Prague Spring ===
Until the events of the 1968 Prague Spring, the Budapest School remained supportive of reformist attitudes towards socialism. After the invasion of Czechoslovakia by Warsaw Pact forces and the crushing of dissent, however, the School and Heller came to believe that the Eastern European regimes were entirely corrupted and that reformist theory was apologist. Heller explains in her interview with Polony that:

the regime just could not tolerate any other opinion; that is what a totalitarian regime is. But a totalitarian regime cannot totalize entirely; it cannot dismiss pluralism; pluralism exists in the modern world, but it can outlaw pluralism. To outlaw pluralism means that the Party decided which kind of dissenting opinion was allowed. That is, you could not write something without it being allowed by the Party. But we had started to write and think independently and that was such a tremendous challenge against the way the whole system worked. They could not possibly tolerate not playing by the rules of the game. And we did not play by the rules of the game.

This view was completely incompatible with Kadar's view of Hungary's political future after the Revolution of 1956. According to an interview with Heller in 2010 in the German newspaper Jungle World, she thought that political and criminal processes after 1956 were antisemitic.

After Lukács died in 1971, the School's members were victims of political persecution, were made unemployed through their dismissal from their university jobs, and were subjected to official surveillance and general harassment. Rather than remain as dissidents, Heller and her husband the philosopher Ferenc Fehér, along with many other members of the core group of the School, chose exile in Australia in 1977.

=== Career abroad ===
Heller and Fehér encountered what they regarded as the sterility of local culture and lived in relative suburban obscurity close to La Trobe University in Melbourne. They assisted in the founding of Thesis Eleven in 1980, and its development into a leading Australian journal of social theory and forum for "politically independent" left-wing thought. During this period she also made frequent contributions to Dialectical Anthropology, which was headquartered at the New School for Social Research, where she would soon take an appointment.

As described by Tormey, Heller's mature thought during this time period was based on the tenets that can be attributed to her personal history and experience as a member of the Budapest School, focusing on the stress on the individual as agent; the hostility to the justification of the state of affairs by reference to non-moral or non-ethical criteria; the belief in "human substance" as the origin of everything that is good or worthwhile; and the hostility to forms of theorizing and political practice that deny equality, rationality and self-determination in the name of "our" interests and needs, however defined.

Heller and Fehér left Australia in 1986 to take up positions in The New School in New York City, where Heller held the position of Hannah Arendt Professor of Philosophy in the Graduate Studies Program. Her contribution to the field of philosophy was recognized by the many awards that she received (such as the Hannah Arendt Prize for Political Philosophy, Bremen, 1995) and the Szechenyi National Prize in Hungary, 1995 and the various academic societies that she served on, including the Hungarian Academy of Sciences. In 2006, she visited China for a week for the first time.

Heller researched and wrote prolifically on ethics, Shakespeare, aesthetics, political theory, modernity, and the role of Central Europe in historical events. From 1990, Heller was more interested in the issues of aesthetics in The Concept of the Beautiful (1998), Time Is Out of Joint (2002), and Immortal Comedy (2005).

In 2006, she was the recipient of the Sonning Prize, in 2010 she was one of three recipients of the Goethe Medal, and in 2014 she received the Wallenberg Medal.

In 2010, Heller, with 26 other well-known and successful Hungarian women, joined the campaign for a referendum for a female quota in the Hungarian legislature.

Heller published internationally renowned works, including republications of her previous works in English, all of which are internationally revered by scholars such as Lydia Goehr (on Heller's The Concept of the Beautiful), Richard Wolin (on Heller's republication of A Theory of Feelings), Dmitri Nikulin (on comedy and ethics), John Grumley (whose own work focuses on Heller in Agnes Heller: A Moralist in the Vortex of History), John Rundell (on Heller's aesthetics and theory of modernity), Preben Kaarsholm (on Heller's A Short History of My Philosophy), among others.

Heller was professor emeritus at the New School for Social Research in New York. She worked actively both academically and politically around the globe. She spoke at the Imre Kertész College in Jena, Germany, together with Polish sociologist Zygmunt Bauman, at the Tübingen Book Fair in Germany speaking together with Former German Justice Minister, Herta Däubler-Gmelin, and other venues worldwide.

== Personal life ==
Heller married fellow philosopher István Hermann in 1949. Their only daughter, Zsuzsanna "Zsuzsa" Hermann, was born on 1 October 1952. After their divorce in 1962, Heller married Ferenc Fehér in 1963, also a member of Lukács' circle. Heller and Fehér had a son, György Fehér (1964). Ferenc Fehér died in 1994.

Ágnes Heller mentions that prominent Hungarian violinist Leopold Auer was related to her family on her mother's side. Heller is second-cousin of 20th century contemporary composer György Ligeti.

In November 2018, Heller participated in the first international conference on Eastern European Marxist Critical Theory at Sichuan University for one week. While going for a swim in Lake Balaton on 19 July 2019, Heller drowned in Balatonalmádi.

== Documentary ==
The Documentary "Agnes Heller: Philosopher, Dissident, Activist" was released in 2026 and won the Best Feature Documentary Award at the Manhattan Film Festival 2026 and the Exceptional Merit Award at the Documentaries Without Borders International Film Festival 2026. Written by James O'Higgins and directed by Helio San Miguel, the documentary was filmed over several years near the end of Heller's life.

"This film presents the story of prominent Jewish Hungarian philosopher Agnes Heller. It focuses on her dramatic life and influential ideas, covering some of the most traumatic historical episodes of the 20th century that have defined the world in which we live in today, and that served as the engine for her own theories in ethics and philosophy of history. It also delves into current political topics such as totalitarianism, populism, extremism, repression, the growing threat of authoritarianism, democracy, social progress, inequality, rule of law, ethical behavior, resilience, and optimism in the midst of unspeakable tragedy.

The film was shot in Budapest, New York, Wroclaw and Umbria, and uses interviews with Agnes Heller, colleagues, friends and family members, as well as archival material, to show her illuminating analyses and her relentlessly optimistic outlook on life, while offering a vigorous defense of liberal democracy".

== Awards and honors ==
- Lessing Award, Hamburg (1981)
- Hannah Arendt professor of philosophy, Bremen (1994)
- Széchenyi Prize (1995) – Tudományos munkássága elismeréseként.
- Doctor honoris causa, Melbourne (1996)
- Order of Merit of the Republic of Hungary (Civilian), Grand Cross – Star (2004)
- European Parliament Italian Section Award (2004)
- Pro Scientia Golden Medal (2005)
- Sonning Prize (2006)
- Hermann Cohen Award (2007)
- Vig Mónika Award (2007)
- Mazsike Várhegyi György Award (2007)
- Freeman of Budapest (2008)
- Goethe Medal (2010)
- Hungarian Socialist Party Medal for public activity (2011)
- Wallenberg Medal (2014)
- International Willy-Brandt Prize (2015)
- Courage in Public Scholarship Award (2016)
- Friedrich Nietzsche Prize (posthum) (2019)

In 2023, the University of Innsbruck named a new building on its campus after the philosopher: Ágnes-Heller-Haus.

== Works ==
=== Articles ===
- "The Marxist Theory of Revolution and the Revolution in Everyday Life" (Telos, Fall 1970)
- "On the New Adventures of the Dialectic" (Telos, Spring 1977)
- "Forms of Equality" (Telos, Summer 1977)
- "Towards an anthropology of feeling" (Dialectical Anthropology 4, 1–20, 1979)
- "Comedy and Rationality" (Telos, Fall 1980)
- "The Antinomies of Peace" (Telos, Fall 1982)
- "From Red to Green" (Telos, Spring 1984)
- "Lukacs and the Holy Family" (Telos, Winter 1984–5)
- "Towards a Marxist Theory of Value." (Kinesis 5:1, Fall 1972, Southern Illinois University, Carbondale, IL)
- "Hermeneutics in Social Science toward a Hermeneutics of Social Science" (Theory and Society, May 1989)
- "Where are we at home?" (Thesis Eleven 41, 1995)

=== Books ===
- Towards a Marxist Theory of Value. Carbondale: University of Southern Illinois, Telos Books, 1972.
- (contributor) Individuum and Praxis: Positionen der Budapester Schule (ed. György Lukács; collected essays translated from Hungarian). Frankfurt: Suhrkamp, 1975.
- (contributor) The Humanisation of Socialism: Writings of the Budapest School (ed. András Hegedűs; collected essays translated from Hungarian). London: Allison and Busby, 1976.
- The Theory of Need in Marx. London: Allison and Busby, 1976.
- Renaissance Man (English translation of Hungarian original). London, Boston, Henley: Routledge and Kegan Paul, 1978.
- On Instincts (English translation of Hungarian original). Assen: Van Gorcum, 1979.
- A Theory of History. London: Routledge and Kegan Paul, 1982.
- Dictatorship Over Needs (with Ferenc Fehér and G. Markus). Oxford: Basil Blackwell, 1983.
- Hungary, 1956 Revisited: The Message of a Revolution – a Quarter of a Century After (with F. Fehér). London, Boston, Sydney: George Allen and Unwin, 1983.
- (ed.) Lukács Revalued. Oxford: Basil Blackwell, 1983 (paperback, 1984).
- Everyday Life (English translation of Hungarian 1970 original). London: Routledge and Kegan Paul, 1984.
- A Radical Philosophy B. Blackwell; First edition. (1 January 1984)
- The Power of Shame: A Rationalist Perspective. London: Routledge and Kegan Paul, 1985.
- Doomsday or Deterrence (with F. Fehér). White Plains: M. E. Sharpe, 1986.
- (ed. with F. Fehér) Reconstructing Aesthetics. Oxford: Basil Blackwell, 1986.
- Eastern Left – Western Left. Freedom, Totalitarianism, Democracy (with F. Fehér). Cambridge, New York: Polity Press, Humanities Press, 1987.
- Beyond Justice, Oxford, Boston: Basil Blackwell, 1988.
- General Ethics. Oxford, Boston: Basil Blackwell, 1989.
- The Postmodern Political Condition (with F. Fehér). Cambridge, New York: Polity Press Columbia University Press, 1989.
- Can Modernity Survive? Cambridge, Berkeley, Los Angeles: Polity Press and University of California Press, 1990.
- From Yalta to Glasnost: The Dismantling of Stalin's Empire (with F. Fehér). Oxford, Boston: Basil Blackwell, 1990.
- The Grandeur and Twilight of Radical Universalism (with F. Fehér). New Brunswick: Transaction, 1990.
- A Philosophy of Morals. Oxford, Boston: Basil Blackwell, 1990.
- An Ethics of Personality. Cambridge: Basil Blackwell, 1996.
- A Theory of Modernity. Cambridge, MA: Wiley-Blackwell, 1999.
- The Time is Out of Joint: Shakespeare as Philosopher of History. Cambridge, MA: Wiley-Blackwell, 2000.
- The insolubility of the "Jewish question", or Why was I born Hebrew, and why not negro? Budapest: Múlt és Jövő Kiadó, 2004.
- Immortal Comedy: The Comic Phenomenon in Art, Literature, and Life. Lanham et al.: Lexington Books, Rowman and Littlefield Publishers Inc, 2005.
- A mai történelmi regény ("The historical novel today", in Hungarian). Budapest: Múlt és Jövő Kiadó, 2011.
- Aesthetics and modernity : essays. Lanham : Lexington Books, 2011.

== Sources ==
- R. J. Crampton Eastern Europe in the Twentieth Century-And Beyond. Second Edition. London: Routledge, 1994.
- Ferenc Fehér and Agnes Heller (1983), Hungary 1956 Revisited: The Message of a revolution- a Quarter of a Century After, London, UK: George Allen and Unwin Publishers Ltd
- John Grumley (2005), Ágnes Heller: A Moralist in the Vortex of History, London, UK: Pluto Press
- Curriculum vitae of Ágnes Heller
- Agnes Heller (2000), The Frankfurt School, 2 December 2005.
- Csaba Polony, "Interview with Ágnes Heller"
- Simon Tormey (2001), Ágnes Heller: Socialism, Autonomy and the Postmodern, Manchester, UK: Manchester University Press
- Fu Qilin, "Budapest School Aesthetics: An Interview with Agnes Heller", Thesis Eleven, 2008, Vol. 1, no. 94.
- Agnes Heller, "Preface to A Study of Agnes Heller's thoughts about Aesthetic Modernity by Fu Qilin", Compatarative Literature, 2006, vol. 8, no. 1

Awards and achievements
Preceded by Nicholas Winton	Wallenberg Medalist; 2014	Succeeded by Masha Gessen
