= European unemployment insurance =

Proposed transfer system for the Eurozone

European unemployment insurance (also known as a European unemployment benefit scheme - EUBS) is a proposed transfer system for the Eurozone that is intended to provide macroeconomic stabilization. Such a system would drain purchasing power from booming economies, preventing overheating while bolstering economies which experience a recession.

== Variants under discussion ==
There are two basic variants of the system discussed: a "genuine" European unemployment insurance and an "equivalent" European unemployment insurance. In a "genuine" system, employees in the Eurozone would be directly insured against the unemployment risk through a European insurance scheme which would pay a wage replacement in the case of unemployment. In an "equivalent" system, a European fund would pay out funds to either the national budget or national unemployment insurance in case unemployment increases steeply in a member state.

Thus, an "equivalent" European unemployment insurance can also be seen as a reinsurance for national unemployment systems.

== History ==
The idea of a European unemployment insurance goes back to the 1970s, when the possibility of introducing a common currency for the European Community was first mentioned in the Marjolin Report. The authors of the Marjolin Report state: "...the means of redressing imbalances between Community countries should be considerably reinforced…. The introduction of a community system of unemployment benefit would constitute an effective approach."

Reference to the debate was made in the MacDougall Report and in a number of works on possible transfer systems commissioned by the European Commission in the early 1990s, when the institutions for managing the common currency were designed.

The modern debate was started with proposals by the German economist Sebastian Dullien who in 2007 and 2008 published several papers on a possible European unemployment insurance and later worked on the concept in detail for the European Commission. The idea gained new prominence after the onset of the European debt crisis, when the lack of a fiscal capacity for the euro area became evident, and the idea was mentioned in the four presidents' report of 2012.

In 2014, a large consortium under the leadership of the Centre for European Policy Studies think tank in Brussels was asked by the European Commission to write an extensive feasibility study on a potential unemployment scheme which detailed the different options for such a proposal, the technical challenges and the macroeconomic impact. The study was presented in early 2017.

The first macroeconomic simulation of a European unemployment insurance system using a dynamic general equilibrium model of European labour markets was presented in a paper by Árpád Ábrahám, João Brogueira de Sousa, Ramon Marimon and Lukas Mayr, at the time economists in the Department of Economics of the European University Institute.

== Political debate ==
Former European Commissioner for Employment, Social Affairs and Inclusion László Andor repeatedly called for the introduction of a European unemployment insurance.

In June 2018, the German finance minister Olaf Scholz proposed European unemployment insurance as an element of Eurozone governance reform.

== See also ==
- Unemployment benefits
