= Jean L. Cohen =

American political scientist

- Born: Jean Louise Cohen; 28 November 1946 (age 79)

Academic background
- Education: New School for Social Research (PhD)

Academic work
- Discipline: Political theory
- School or tradition: Critical theory
- Institutions: Bennington College; University of California, Berkeley; Columbia University

Jean Louise Cohen (born November 28, 1946) is an American critical theorist who is the Nell and Herbert Singer Professor of Political Thought at Columbia University. She specializes in contemporary political and legal theory with particular research interests in democratic theory, critical theory, civil society, gender and the law.

== Academic career ==
She received her PhD in 1979 from the New School for Social Research. She served as Assistant Professor of Social Science at Bennington College from 1980-1983 and as Assistant Professor of Sociology at the University of California, Berkeley (1984) before coming to Columbia. Cohen has been Associate Editor of the journals Telos, Constellations and Dissent. She was elected one of the three editors in chief of Constellations in May 2014. Her current projects concern rethinking the administrative state and its relation to capitalist oligarchy through reflecting on distinctions between technocratic and bureaucratic ethics and projects. Prior to this she worked on state and popular sovereignty in the epoch of globalization, and defended the law-making capacities of secular polities from religiously motivated particularistic legal pluralism. Of course she is best known for her now classic co-authored book with Andrew Arato, Civil Society and Political Theory. Jean L. Cohen serves on the Editorial Advisory Board of the Council's journal, Ethics & International Affairs. Civil Society and Political Theory, co-authored with Andrew Arato, is viewed by many as a seminal text on contemporary civil society.

== Research interests ==
Cohen's areas of research are: sovereignty, international law, global justice, governance, contemporary political theory, continental political theory, Germany, France, American legal theory, feminist theory, civil society, privacy, gender and sexuality, social movements, rights, and state and religion.

== Publications ==
=== Articles and chapters ===
- Whose Sovereignty? Empire Versus International Law
- Changing Paradigms of Citizenship and the Exclusiveness of the Demos
- “Eviscerating the State: The New Oligarchic and Autocratic Projects to Undermine American Constitutional Democracy," Emancipations: A Journal of Critical Social Analysis. Vol.4: 2025 https://scholarsjunction.msstate.edu/emancipations/vol4/iss2/2/
- “Cycles of Oligarchy, Democracy and Authoritarianism, The American Case “Constellations, Early View October 2024 , 30 pages Printed Version, June 2025
- “Rethinking Hybrid Regimes: The American Case”, Constellations, Fall 2023, 1-20.
- Does voluntary association make democracy work
- “Civil Society and Globalization: Rethinking the Categories," in Diversity and its discontents by Neil J. Smelser, Jeffrey C. Alexander
- “Hollow Parties and Their Movement-ization : The Populist Conundrum” Philosophy & Social Criticism 45/no.9-10 (Nov-Dec 2019), 084-1105
- “Populism and the Politics of Resentment”, Jus Cogens 1(1) 5-39, August 2019
- “Sovereignty, the Corporate Religious, and Jurisdictional/Political Pluralism”. Theoretical Inquiries in Law, Vol. 18 No. 2, July 2017 pp. 547–575

=== Books ===
- Cohen, J. L. (1982). Class and civil society: The limits of Marxian critical theory. Amherst: University of Massachusetts Press. ISBN 9780870233807
- Cohen, J. L., & Arato, A. (1992). Civil society and political theory. Cambridge, Mass: MIT Press. ISBN 9780262270519
- Cohen, J. L. (2002). Regulating intimacy: A new legal paradigm. Princeton, N.J: Princeton Univ. Press. ISBN 9781400825035
- Cohen, J. L. (2012). Globalization and sovereignty: Rethinking legality, legitimacy and constitutionalism. ISBN 9780521765855
- Cohen, J. L., & Arato, A. (2022). Populism and civil society: The challenge to constitutional democracy.
