= Nadia Urbinati =

Italian academic (born 1955)

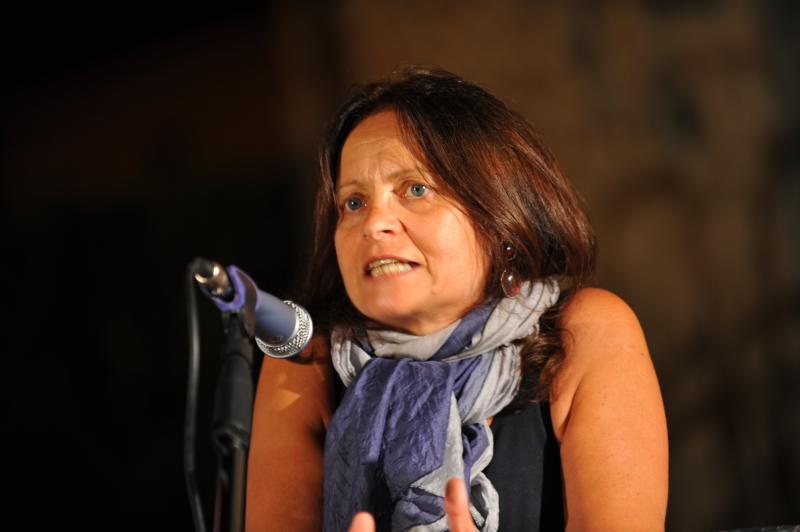
- Born: 26 January 1955 (age 71); Rimini, Italy

Academic background
- Education: European University Institute (PhD, 1989)

Academic work
- Discipline: Political science
- Sub-discipline: Political theory
- Institutions: The New School; Columbia University
- Main interests: Political representation, participatory democracy

Nadia Urbinati (born 26 January 1955) is an Italian political theorist. She is the Kyriakos Tsakopoulos Professor of Political Theory at Columbia University.

== Personal life ==
In 1989, she received her Ph.D. at European University Institute in Florence, Italy. She is also a naturalized US citizen.

== Academic work ==
Urbinati specializes in modern and contemporary political thought and the democratic and anti-democratic traditions. She teaches at Columbia University where she co-chaired the Columbia University Faculty Seminar on Political and Social Thought. She is one of the longest-serving scholars of populism in modern academia.

With Andrew Arato, she was the co-editor of Constellations: An International Journal of Critical and Democratic Theory. She is also a member of the Executive Committee of the Foundation Reset Dialogues on Civilization.

Prior to Columbia, she was a member of the School of Social Sciences of the Institute for Advanced Study in Princeton, New Jersey and was a Laurance S. Rockefeller Visiting Fellow at the University Center for Human Values at Princeton. In Italy, Urbinati is permanent visiting professor at Pisa's Scuola Superiore di Studi Universitari e Perfezionamento Sant'Anna and has taught at Bocconi University in Milan, Sciences Po in Paris, and the University of Campinas in Brazil. She co-authored The Anti-Egalitarian Mutation with Arturo Zampaglione.

== Awards ==
In 2008, Italian president Giorgio Napolitano made Urbinati a Commander of the Order of Merit of the Italian Republic "for her contribution to the study of democracy and the diffusion of Italian liberal and democratic thought abroad."

She is the winner of the 2008–09 Lenfest/Columbia Distinguished Faculty Award and she received the David and Elaine Spitz Prize for the best book in liberal and democratic theory for Mill on Democracy.

== Bibliography ==
Urbinati is the author of a number of journal articles and books, including:

- Me The People: How Populism Transforms Democracy (Harvard University Press, 2019)
- The Tyranny of the Moderns (Yale University Press 2015)
- Democracy Disfigured: Opinion, Truth and the People (Harvard University Press, 2014)
- Representative Democracy: Principles and Genealogy (University of Chicago Press, 2006)
- Mill on Democracy: From the Athenian Polis to Representative Government (University of Chicago Press, 2002)

Urbinati is also a political columnist for Italian newspapers.
