= Arturo Zampaglione =

Italian journalist

- Education: Sapienza University of Rome; Fletcher School of Law and Diplomacy
- Occupations: journalist; author
- Years active: 1975–present

Arturo Zampaglione is an Italian journalist and author . He is a former New York correspondent for La Repubblica, where he reported on global events for over two decades. Zampaglione is currently involved in projects promoting the study of Etruscan history and civilization, dividing his time between New York City and Rome. He taught international journalism at New York University and co-authored The Anti-Egalitarian Mutation with Nadia Urbinati.

== Biography ==
He was born on September 28, 1952 in Toronto, Canada into a prominent family, the grandson of Italian politician Giuseppe Spataro and the son of diplomat and author Gerardo Zampaglione. He graduated magna cum laude from the Sapienza University of Rome and earned a master's degree in international affairs from the Fletcher School of Law and Diplomacy at Tufts University.

== Career ==
=== Early work ===
Before pursuing journalism, Zampaglione worked in various capacities, including roles in the Italian Senate with the parliamentary group Sinistra Indipendente (Independent Left) and at organizations such as Confagricoltura and Lega delle Cooperative in Rome. During this period, he authored books on agricultural policy, including Un groviglio con undici nodi (1979), Guida alla Terra (1980), and Guida alla nuova agricoltura (1984).

During the same period he published the book Caro Antonio. Le memorie di Pertini raccontate ai giovani in 1985.

=== Journalism ===
Zampaglione began his journalism career with L'Unità and later joined the economic weekly Il Mondo. In 1988, he was hired by Eugenio Scalfari, founder of La Repubblica, where he served as the New York Bureau Chief until 2003 and subsequently as a Special Correspondent.

His reporting covered economics, geopolitics, and social issues. Zampaglione was known for his on-the-ground coverage, including his immediate reporting from Ground Zero following the September 11 attacks.

Throughout his career, Zampaglione interviewed notable figures such as Bill Gates, Jeff Bezos, Tony Blair, Hillary Clinton, and Donald Trump.

Beyond his journalism career, Zampaglione has been involved in education and promoting cultural heritage. From 2007 to 2008, he taught a course titled Foreign Posting at the Arthur L. Carter Journalism Institute at New York University.

In 2013, Zampaglione, together with Alessandra Baldini, founded OnuItalia, the first online publication dedicated to documenting Italy's activities and role within the United Nations.

=== Projects on Etruscan civilization ===
In addition to his journalistic work, Zampaglione has demonstrated a strong interest in Etruscan history. He is the founder of two initiatives dedicated to the study and promotion of this ancient civilization. The first, Vulci nel Mondo, is a project aimed at reconstructing the identity of the Etruscan city of Vulci through the development of a virtual museum and a comprehensive artifact database. The second initiative, Etruscan Times, is an online publication that offers regular updates, research findings, and insights into various aspects of Etruscan civilization, contributing to a broader public understanding of this historically significant society.

== Personal life ==
Zampaglione has been married three times, including to philosopher Giovanna Borradori, with whom he has two children, Gerardo and Lucia. He is currently married to Francesca Gnudi.

An enthusiastic cook, his special preparation of polenta was featured in The New York Times food section.
