= István Mészáros (philosopher) =

Hungarian philosopher

- Born: 19 December 1930; Budapest, Kingdom of Hungary
- Died: 1 October 2017 (aged 86); Margate, England
- Spouse: Donatella Morisi (m. 1956; died 2007)

Education
- Education: University of Budapest
- Thesis: Szatíra és valóság ("Satire and Reality") (1955)
- Doctoral advisor: György Lukács

Philosophical work
- Era: Contemporary philosophy
- Region: Western philosophy
- School: Continental philosophy Budapest School
- Institutions: University of Budapest's Institute of Aesthetics (1951–1956); University of Turin (1956–1959); Bedford College (1959–1961); University of St. Andrews (1961–1966); University of Sussex (1966–1972; 1976–1995); York University (1973–1976)
- Main interests: Ideology
- Notable ideas: Structural crisis of capital

István Mészáros (UK: /ˈmɛsərɒs/, US: /-roʊs/; Hungarian: [ˈiʃtvaːn ˈmeːsaːroʃ]; 19 December 1930 – 1 October 2017) was a Hungarian Marxist philosopher. Described as "one of the foremost political philosophers of the late twentieth and early twenty-first centuries" by Monthly Review, Mészáros wrote mainly about the possibility of a transition from capitalism to socialism. His magnum opus, Beyond Capital: Toward a Theory of Transition (1995), was concerned not only with this theme but also provided a conceptual distinction between capitalism and capital, and an analysis of the current capitalist society and its "structural crisis". He was interested in the critique of the "bourgeois ideology", including the idea of "there is no alternative", and he also elaborated analysis on the failures of "real socialism".

== Biography ==
=== Early life in Hungary ===
Mészáros was born in Budapest, Hungary. He was raised by his single mother and his maternal grandmother, and at age twelve falsified his birth date to work along with his mother in an airplane factory building engines. The poor working conditions would later arise "his lifelong hatred of exploitation and oppression". When he was 15 or 16, Mészáros was introduced to the Marxist philosophy during visits to a bookshop. After having contact with Karl Marx's The Eighteenth Brumaire of Louis Napoleon, Friedrich Engels's Anti-Dühring, and Marx and Engels's The Communist Manifesto, he became interested in the works of György Lukács about Hungarian literature. Mészáros liked Lukács's works "so much" that he even sold personal belongings to buy them and decided to enter the University of Budapest. He did so in 1949 when he won a scholarship with the emergence of a Communist state in Hungary.

At the university, he affiliated himself to the so-called "Budapest School", a group of Hungarian philosophers who were taught or influenced by Lukács, including Ágnes Heller and György Márkus. During this period, Lukács was very criticised by the Hungarian Communist Party and Mátyás Rákosi's government banned some of his works between 1949 and the mid-1950s. Because of his allegiance to Lukács and his attendance of Lukács's seminars, Mészáros almost got expelled from the university. Later, Lukács nominated Mészáros as his assistant at the Institute of Aesthetics because of his public contestation of the censorship of Mihály Vörösmarty's play Csongor és Tünde denounced as a "pessimist aberration". His pro-Vörösmarty essay, published in the literary magazine Csillag, earned him the 1951 Attila József Prize and helped the reincorporation of the play in the National Theatre's repertoire.

During the 1950s, Mészáros was an active member of the Hungarian Writers' Union and was involved in artistic and literary circles, notably in the anti-Stalinist Petőfi circle—a group associated with the Hungarian Revolution of 1956. This interest for cultural issues reverberated in his 1955 doctoral dissertation in philosophy entitled Szatíra és valóság ("Satire and Reality"). In the following year, he was made editor of the cultural magazine Eszmélet, created by Lukács, composer Zoltán Kodály, and other personalities. Mészáros was also chosen to be an associate professor of philosophy and Lukács's successor at the Institute of Aesthetics. However, after the defeat of the revolution and Lukács's imprisonment for supporting it, Mészáros verified that "there was no hope for socialist transformation in Hungary". So, after the Soviet invasion in 1956, he left the country, becoming one of the first citizens from a Communist country to criticise Stalinism.

=== Academic career in the West ===
Mészáros moved to Italy and was a professor at the University of Turin. During his time in Turin, he wrote a book of memoirs about the Hungarian uprising titled La rivolta degli intellettuali in Ungheria ("The Revolt of the Intellectuals in Hungary") that was published in 1958 by Giulio Einaudi Editore. He worked in Italy until moving to the United Kingdom, where he worked at Bedford College, London (1959–1961) and the University of St. Andrews (1961–1966). In 1964, he released the book Attila József e l'arte moderna through the Milanese publisher Lerici. He joined the University of Sussex in 1966, where he held the Chair of Philosophy. His 1970 book Marx's Theory of Alienation established his reputation in the English-speaking world, and won him that year Isaac Deutscher Memorial Prize. Receiving the award, he got the opportunity to do the first Isaac Deutscher Memorial Lecture at the London School of Economics in the following year. Originally conceived as "Alienation and Social Control" in late 1970, the lecture was renamed "The Necessity of Social Control". In 1971, it appeared under the title "Alienation and the Necessity of Social Control" in the Socialist Register, and was also published by Merlin Press in book-format as The Necessity of Social Control.

In late 1972, Mészáros was appointed professor of philosophy to teach political theory courses at York University, Toronto, and then resigned his position at Sussex. However, he had his visa refused by the Canadian government because his entry was not "in the best interests of the country" and he posed a "security risk". Sussex's fellows Tom Bottomore, Roy Edgeley and Laurence Lerner spoke against the government decision, as well as did York university officials, and 30 University of British Columbia's faculty members and students led by historian Jan M. Bak. After accusations of being a "Russian spy" for KGB, a letter to Prime Minister Pierre Trudeau by political scientist C. B. Macpherson, Mészáros's deportation, and the change of immigration minister from Bryce Mackasey to Bob Andras, Mészáros was allowed to enter Canada legally in January 1973. After that, he worked as a senior professor of York's Social and Political Thought Program for three years before returning to Sussex.

Mészáros collected and edited thirteen 1958–1976 essays by Philippine historian Renato Constantino in a book titled Neo-Colonial Identity and Counter-Consciousness: Essays in Cultural Decolonisation. First published by Merlin Press in 1978 and then by M. E. Sharpe in 1979, it contained a 23-page introduction, which would be later re-published in Journal of Contemporary Asia as a part of a tribute done in 2000 after Constantino's death.

Mészaros was appointed emeritus professor by Sussex in 1991, and he won the Lukács Prize in 1992. In 1995, he retired from Sussex, was nominated for the Michael Harrington Award for his work Beyond Capital, and was also elected a member of the Hungarian Academy of Sciences. In the late 1990s, he became an advisor to Monthly Review editors Harry Magdoff and John Bellamy Foster, and also contributed to the magazine and its parent Monthly Review Press.

In 2009, he won the Venezuelan Premio Libertador al Pensamiento Crítico ("Libertador Prize for Critical Thinking") for his work The Challenge and Burden of Historical Time. After this work, he also published the two-volume critique of "bourgeois ideology" Social Structure and Forms of Consciousnes: The Social Determination of Method in 2010 and The Dialectic of Structure and History in 2011. Following the publication of latter, he planned to write a sequel for Beyond Capital, entitled Beyond Leviathan: Critique of the State. Meszáros drafted three volumes, The Historic Challenge, The Harsh Reality, and The Necessary Alternative, with the first volume almost completed. However, in 2017, he died in Margate, where he was being cared for after a stroke in September made him leave his home in Ramsgate, Kent.

== Thought ==
Mészáros was a critic of politicians and philosophers who constantly used the sentence "there is no alternative". Usually associated with conservative figures like Margaret Thatcher, Mészáros stated it reached Labour parties, Communist statesmen like Mikhail Gorbachev, and former radicals turned post-modernists. Because of this, he believed Jean-Paul Sartre was an important philosopher to whom "Marxists owed a great debt to". Critical of Sartre's existentialism, Mészáros praised his opposition to the "there is no alternative" motto and affirmed, "I don't embrace his ideas but I embrace the aim". Mészáros declared, "Sartre was a man who always preached the diametrical opposite: there is an alternative, there must be an alternative; you as an individual have to rebel against this power, this monstrous power of capital. Marxists on the whole failed to voice that side". This was reflected on Mészáros's The Work of Sartre: Search for Freedom, first published in 1979 and expanded in 2012 with a new section, "The Challenge of History".

Mészáros believed it was important to make a distinction between capitalism and capital to theorise about a transition to socialism. He posited that capital appeared "thousand of years" prior to capitalism and that it can continue without capitalism, which is the case of Soviet Union (USSR) in his understanding. In this sense, a revolutionary upheaval can overthrow capitalism in a limited area by the expropriation of the capitalist class, but the power of capital can still control the system through the division of labour and the "hierarchical command structure of capital". Mészáros defined capital as "command system whose mode of functioning is accumulation-oriented". In his conception, the extraction of surplus value can be done in a "political way"—like in the case of USSR—or through "an economically regulated extraction of surplus labour and surplus value"—like in the West. Mészáros argued that the accumulation process in the Stalinist states "was done in a very improper fashion from the point of view of productivity" and in a 1982 essay said that it would eventually collapse because of this fact—and not because of US-backed anticommunist military policies.

== Personal life ==
Mészáros met his Italian wife, Donatella Morisi, in 1955 in Paris; they were married on 14 February 1956; she died in 2007. They had three children: Laura, born 1956; Susie, born 1960; and Giorgio, born 1962.

== Works ==
Book	Date	Publisher	Notes	Ref.
La rivolta degli intellettuali in Ungheria ("The Revolt of the Intellectuals in Hungary")	1958	Giulio Einaudi, Turin	In Italian	
Attila József e l'arte moderna ("Attila József and Modern Art")	1964	Lerici, Milan	In Italian	
Marx's Theory of Alienation	1970	Merlin Press, London	Won the Isaac Deutscher Award	
Aspects of History and Class Consciousness	1971	Merlin Press, London	Editor of a series of seminars by Marxist scholars	
The Necessity of Social Control	1971	Merlin Press, London	Isaac Deutscher Memorial Lecture	
Lukacs' Concept of Dialectic	1972	Merlin Press, London		
Neo-Colonial Identity and Counter-Consciousness: Essays in Cultural Decolonisation	1978	Merlin Press, London	Editor of essays by Renato Constantino	
The Work of Sartre: Search for Freedom	1979	Harvester Press, Brighton	Re-edited and expanded in 2012 as Search for Freedom and the Challenge of History by Monthly Review Press, New York	
Philosophy, Ideology and Social Science: Essays in Negation and Affirmation	1986	Harvester Wheatsheaf, Brighton		
The Power of Ideology	1989	Harvester Wheatsheaf, Brighton	Re-edited in 2005 by Zed Books, London	
Beyond Capital: Toward a Theory of Transition	1995	Monthly Review Press, New York		
Socialism or Barbarism: From the "American Century" to the Crossroads	2001	Monthly Review Press, New York		
The Challenge and Burden of Historical Time: Socialism in the Twenty-First Century	2008	Monthly Review Press, New York		
The Structural Crisis of Capital	2010	Monthly Review Press, New York		
Historical Actuality of the Socialist Offensive: Alternative to Parliamentarism	2010	Bookmarks Publications, Londo		
Social Structure and Forms of Consciousness, Volume I: The Social Determination of Method	2010	Monthly Review Press, New York		
Social Structure and Forms of Consciousness, Volume II: The Dialectic of Structure and History	2011	Monthly Review Press, New York		
The Necessity of Social Control	2014	Monthly Review Press, New York		
Beyond Leviathan	2022	Monthly Review Press, New York		

Awards
Preceded by Martin Nicolaus	Deutscher Memorial Prize; 1970	Vacant Title next held by Paul Walton and Andrew Gamble
