= Socialism or Barbarism: From the "American Century" to the Crossroads =

2001 book by István Mészáros

Socialism or Barbarism
- Cover of the first edition
- Author: István Mészáros
- Publisher: Monthly Review Press
- Publication date: 2001
- Media type: Print
- Pages: 126
- ISBN: 1-58367-052-1
- OCLC: 46671181
- Dewey Decimal: 335 21
- LC Class: HB501 .M6225 2001

Socialism or Barbarism: From the "American Century" to the Crossroads is a book about globalism, U.S. socialism and capitalist systems by Hungarian Marxist philosopher and economist István Mészáros. It was published in 2001 and is composed of two parts, the first part is an expanded version of an essay of the same title originally published in 2000; the second part consists of an interview conducted in 1998.

The term "socialism or barbarism" refers to a quote by Rosa Luxemburg (Junius Pamphlet).

== Summary ==
Mészáros is convinced that the future of socialism will be decided in the U.S. and sees its main obstacle to be the globalization of Keynesian neo-liberalism. He reckons that the 21st century will coincide with the "third stage of capitalism", which Mészáros characterizes as the barbarous global competition for domination between a plurality of free-market capitalist systems. His examination of the history of American capitalism predicts several eminent ramifications to this struggle: imperialist driven territorial expansion in the Middle East, the continuation and increase of NATO aggression, increased infrastructure weakening with major degradation in the quality of life for the lower class, and eventually a proxy war with China via U.S.'s defense treaties with Japan.

Much of the book is devoted to applying Marx's nineteenth century theories to current events, such as the environment:

Marx was to some extent already aware of the "ecological problem," i.e. the problems of ecology under the rule of capital and the dangers implicit in it for human survival. In fact he was the first to conceptualize it. He talked about pollution, and he insisted that the logic of capital – which must pursue profit, in accordance with the dynamic of self-expansion and capital accumulation – cannot have any consideration for human values and even for human survival. ... What you cannot find in Marx, of course, is an account of the utmost gravity of the situation facing us. For us the threat to human survival is a matter of immediacy.

What Mészáros prescribes is a labor union socialist solution, specifically the syndicalist form of socialism that Samuel Gompers had abandoned when the AFL provided a workforce for the U.S. involvement in World War I. He advocates a Marxist form of socialism:

What is of primary importance is that under all conceivable varieties of the capital system surplus labor must be appropriated by a separate body superimposed on, and structurally dominating, labor. Here, as you can see, the fundamental category is surplus labor, and not surplus value, as people often erroneously assume. ... In order to do away with the labor theory of value, you have to away with the extraction and allocation of surplus labor by an external body of any sort, be that political or economic. ... In other words, we can only speak about socialism when the people are in control of their own activity and of the allocation of its fruits to their own ends.

== See also ==
- Alexander Zinoviev
- The Shock Doctrine by Naomi Klein
- Multitudes by Negri & Hardt
- Hegemony or Survival by Noam Chomsky
- Anti-globalization movement

== Bibliography ==
- Mészáros, István (2001). Socialism or Barbarism?. Monthly Review Press. ISBN 0-7456-3632-2.
