= Marianne Thyssen =

Flemish politician (born 1956)

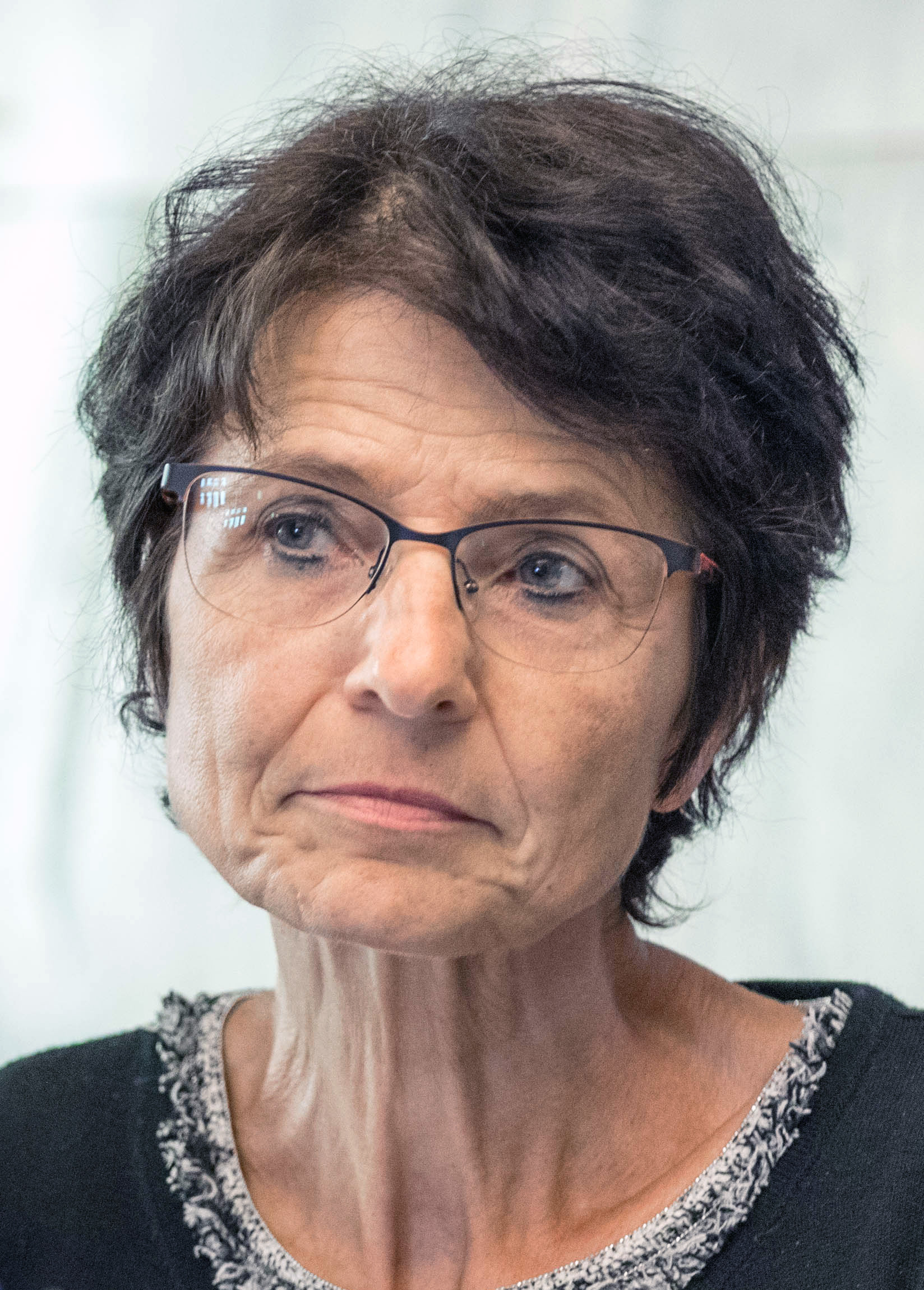
- Thyssen in 2018

European Commissioner for Employment, Social Affairs, Skills and Labour Mobility
- In office 1 November 2014 – 30 November 2019
- Commission: Juncker
- Preceded by: László Andor (Employment, Social Affairs and Inclusion)
- Succeeded by: Nicolas Schmit

Leader of Christian Democratic and Flemish
- In office 15 May 2008 – 23 June 2010
- Preceded by: Wouter Beke (Acting)
- Succeeded by: Wouter Beke

Member of the European Parliament for Belgium
- In office 17 December 1991 – 31 October 2014
- Constituency: Dutch-speaking electoral college

Personal details
- Born: Marianne Leonie Petrus; Thyssen; 24 July 1956 (age 69) Sint-Gillis-Waas, Belgium
- Party: Christian Democratic and Flemish
- Other political affiliations: European People's Party
- Education: University of Leuven

Marianne Leonie Petrus Thyssen (Dutch pronunciation: [maːriˈjɑnə ˈtɛisə(n)]; born 24 July 1956) is a Belgian politician of the Christian Democratic and Flemish Party (CD&V) who served as European Commissioner for Employment, Social Affairs, Skills and Labour Mobility between 2014 and 2019.

== Early life ==
Born in Sint-Gillis-Waas, to a Flemish family, not related to the family of Baron Thyssen, Thyssen graduated from the Catholic University of Leuven (KUL) in 1979, where she obtained a degree in law. She worked as a legal adviser for a Belgian organisation for the self-employed and small and medium-sized businesses UNIZO and the women's network Christelijke Middenstands- en Burgervrouwen (CMBV) now Markant, becoming Director then acting Secretary-General at UNIZO in 1991. From 1986-1988 she acted as legal adviser to the state secretary for public health and disability policy.

== Political activity ==
In 1991, Thyssen became a Member of the European Parliament (MEP) for Flanders with the CD&V, the Flemish Christian Democrats in Belgium; she took the place of Karel Pinxten, who had moved to the Belgian Senate. From 1995-2008 she served as municipal Councillor for Oud-Heverlee, a municipality located in the Belgian province of Flemish Brabant, and in 2001 she became First Alderman for Oud-Heverlee. As a local councillor, she chose to work on such social issues as childcare and care for the elderly. In 2008 Thyssen was elected leader of CD&V party.

During her almost 23 years as a member of the European Parliament Thyssen was re-elected five times. She has sat on the European Parliament's Committee on the Internal Market and Consumer Protection, has substituted for the Committee on International Trade, was a member of the Delegation to the EU-Ukraine Parliamentary Cooperation Committee and a substitute for the Delegation to the EU-Turkey Joint Parliamentary Committee. From 1999-2014 she served as leader of the European People's Party's (EPP) Belgian delegation and from 2004-2009 was elected first vice-president of the EPP.

In 2014 Thyssen was appointed to the European Commission as Commissioner in charge of Employment, Social Affairs, Skills and Labour Mobility for the European Union (EU). She became the first Belgian woman to be appointed Commissioner.

== Early career ==
- 1979: Degree in law at the Catholic University of Leuven (KUL)
- Assistant in the faculty of law, Catholic University of Leuven
- Legal assistant in the office of the State Secretary for Health
- Successively legal adviser, head of a research department and acting Secretary-General at Unizo (organisation for the self-employed and small and medium-sized businesses)

== Career ==
- since 1991: Member of the European Parliament
- Member of the bureau of the European People's Party
- Vice-Chairwoman of the EPP-ED Group's SME Circle
- First Deputy Mayor of Oud-Heverlee until 2008
- Chair woman of the CD&V (15 May 2008 – 23 June 2010)

== See also ==
- 2004 European Parliament election in Belgium

Party political offices
| Preceded by Wouter Beke; Acting | Leader of Christian Democratic and Flemish; 2008–2010 | Succeeded by Wouter Beke |
Political offices
| Preceded by Karel De Gucht | Belgian European Commissioner; 2014–2019 | Succeeded by Didier Reynders |
| Preceded by László Andor as European Commissioner for Employment, Social Affairs and Inclusion | European Commissioner for Employment, Social Affairs, Skills and Labour Mobility; 2014–2019 | Succeeded by Nicolas Schmit |
