= Eszmélet =

- Executive director: Lugosi Győző
- Categories: News magazine
- Frequency: Quarterly
- Publisher: Eszmélet Foundation
- First issue: (1956) 1989
- Company: Eszmélet Foundation Press
- Country: Hungary
- Language: Hungarian
- Website: www.eszmelet.hu
- ISSN: 0865-2139

Eszmélet (Hungarian pronunciation: [ˈɛsmeːlɛt], Consciousness) is a Hungarian quarterly magazine for social critique and culture. Each issue contains essays on current theory, history, an exchange of topics, as well as one or two book reviews.

== History ==
The magazine was founded in the summer of 1956 Aurél Bernáth, Tibor Déry, Gyula Illyés, Zoltán Kodály, and Georg Lukacs, and István Mészáros – a disciple of Lukács - was asked to be acting editor. However, because of the Hungarian Revolution of 1956, only two "emigrant" editions were published in London, in 1958. "Eszmélet" is the title of a poem by Attila József, the famous Hungarian poet.

The journal reappeared in 1989, this time in Hungary. Since 1993 editor in chief was László Andor, since 2009 also European Commissioner for Employment, Social Affairs and Inclusion.

The journal's articles show a radical and consistent criticism of capitalism. It aims to represent social solidarity, individual freedom and human dignity.

In the past two decades, various organizations were formed around the journal (Friends of Eszmélet, Open University of Eszmélet). Their events are open to anyone.

The twentieth anniversary of the journal's foundation was celebrated in Moscow with an issue in Russian.

== Editorial Board ==
Eszter Bartha, Péter Bózsó, Ádám Fülöp, Gábor Kállai R., Matthias I. Köhler, Tamás Krausz (chairperson), Győző Lugosi (executive director), Zoltán Matheika, Éva Nagy, Klára Szarka, Péter Szigeti

== Eszmélet Publishing House ==
- Tamás Krausz - Péter Szigeti: Államszocializmus. Értelmezések - viták - tanulságok [State Socialism: Interpretations, Debates, Conclusions] (2007.)
- Eric J. Hobsbawm: Mozgalmas évek. Egy huszadik századi életút [Interesting Times: A Twentieth-century Life (Lives of the Left)] (2008.)
- István Mészáros: A tőkén túl - Közelítések az átmenet elméletéhez I.rész Az ellenőrizhetetlenség árnya [Beyond Capital: Toward a Theory of Transition Vol 1.] (2008.)
- Eric J. Hobsbawm: Hétköznapi hősök. Ellenállók, lázadók és a dzsessz [Uncommon People: Resistance, Rebellion, and Jazz] (2009.)
- István Mészáros: A tőkén túl - Közelítések az átmenet elméletéhez - II. rész: A szocialista kritika történelmi öröksége [Beyond Capital: Toward a Theory of Transition Vol 2.] (2009.)
- István Mészáros: A tőkén túl. Közelítések az átmenet elméletéhez. III. rész A tőkerendszer strukturális válsága [Beyond Capital: Toward a Theory of Transition Vol 3.] (2010.)
- István Mészáros: A tőkén túl. Közelítések az átmenet elméletéhez. IV. rész. A tárgyalt témákhoz kapcsolódó tanulmányok [Beyond Capital: Toward a Theory of Transition Vol 4.] (2010.)
- Tamás Krausz: Lukács György és a szocialista alternatíva. Tanulmányok és dokumentumok. [György Lukács and the Socialist Alternative. Studies and Documents.] (2010.)
- Immanuel Wallerstein: Bevezetés a világrendszer-elméletbe [World-Systems Analysis: An Introduction] (2010.)
- Göran Therborn: A marxizmustól a posztmarxizmus felé? [From Marxism to Post-Marxism?] (2010.)
- József Pankovits: Az olasz baloldal. Antonio Gramscitól a Demokratikus Pártig [Italian Left from Antonio Gramsci to the Democratic Party] (2010.)
