= László Andor =

Hungarian economist

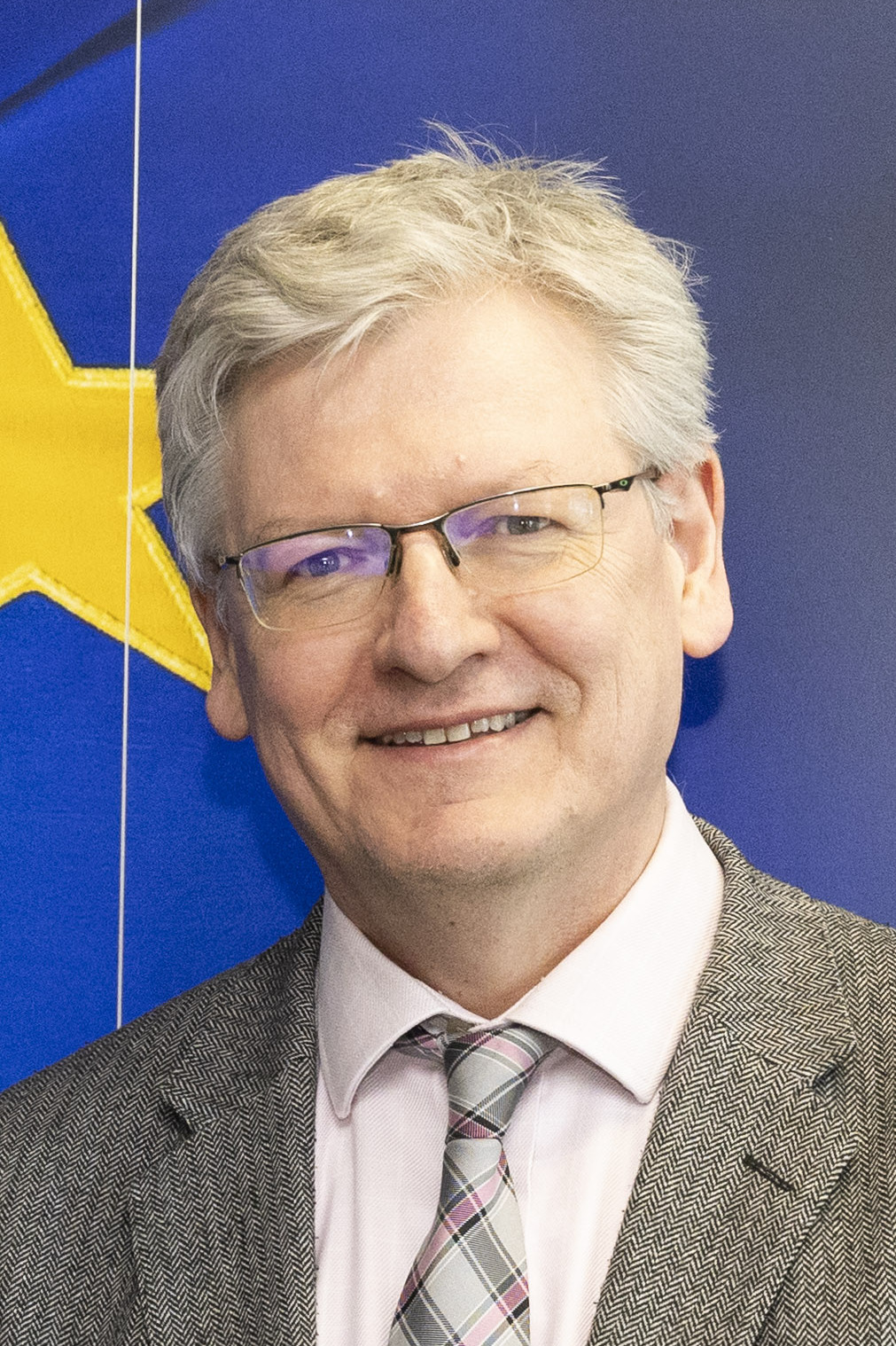
- Andor in 2026

European Commissioner for Employment, Social Affairs and Inclusion
- In office 9 February 2010 – 1 November 2014
- President: José Manuel Barroso
- Preceded by: Vladimír Špidla (Employment, Social Affairs and Equal; Opportunities)
- Succeeded by: Marianne Thyssen (Employment, Social Affairs, Skills and Labour Mobility)

Personal details
- Born: 3 June 1966 (age 60) Zalaegerszeg, Hungary
- Party: Socialist Party
- Spouse: Erika Varsányi
- Children: 3
- Education: Corvinus University; George Washington University; University of Manchester

Video Introduction (English) / (Hungarian)

László Andor (born 3 June 1966) is a Hungarian economist and the Secretary General of the Foundation for European Progressive Studies (FEPS). From 2010 to 2014 he was Commissioner for Employment, Social Affairs and Inclusion in the Barroso II administration of the European Commission. From 2005 to 2010 he was a Member of the Board of Directors of the European Bank for Reconstruction and Development (EBRD), representing the Czech Republic, Croatia, Hungary and Slovakia.

He studied Economics at the Corvinus University of Budapest (then called the Karl Marx University), and later became Associate Professor of Economic Policy at the same institution. He also studied at the George Washington University in Washington, D.C., and in 1993 earned a master's degree in Development Economics at the University of Manchester. Since 1993, he has been editor of a progressive (leftist) Hungarian quarterly social science journal, Eszmélet (Consciousness). Since 2003, he has been a member of the board of the Economic Section of the Hungarian Socialist Party.

He was once appointed Acting Commissioner for Consumer Protection in Neven Mimica's stead, from 19 April 2014 – 25 May 2014 while he was on electoral campaign leave for the 2014 elections to the European Parliament. He ultimately decided to not take up his seat. László Andor is a member of the advisory board of the Prague European Summit.

== Personal life ==
László Andor is married to Erika Varsányi. They have three children.

Political offices
| Preceded by László Kovács | Hungarian European Commissioner; 2010–2014 | Succeeded by Tibor Navracsics |
| Preceded by Vladimír Špidla as European Commissioner for Employment, Social Affairs and Equal Opportunities | European Commissioner for Employment, Social Affairs and Inclusion; 2010–2014 | Succeeded by Marianne Thyssen as European Commissioner for Employment, Social Affairs, Skills and Labour Mobility |
