= Cristina Lafont =

Spanish philosopher

- Born: 1963 (age 62–63); Valencia, Comunidad Valenciana, Spain

Education
- Education: Goethe University of Frankfurt
- Thesis: Sprache und Welterschließung. Zur linguistischen Wende der Hermeneutik Heideggers (1992)
- Doctoral advisor: Jürgen Habermas

Philosophical work
- School: Critical theory; continental philosophy
- Institutions: Northwestern University
- Main interests: Political philosophy; critical theory; hermeneutics; German philosophy; philosophy of language

Cristina Lafont (born 1963) is a Spanish philosopher working in the tradition of critical theory, who holds the position of Harold H. and Virginia Anderson Professor of Philosophy at Northwestern University.

== Biography ==
Lafont graduated ‘cum laude' with a licenciatura in philosophy from the Universidad de Valencia in 1987. From there, she moved to Johann Wolfgang Goethe Universität Frankfurt (Main), where she obtained her PhD in philosophy (Dr. phil.) 'summa cum laude' in 1992 under the supervision of Jürgen Habermas. She was awarded her habilitation by the same university in 2000.

Cristina Lafont has held numerous positions as a distinguished lecturer or visiting professor in the English-speaking, Spanish-speaking and German-speaking academic world. She was Visiting professor at the Universidad Autónoma de Mexico (Mexico), Universidad Carlos III Madrid (Spain), Universidad de Oviedo (Spain), Lehrbeauftragte at the Johann Wolfgang Goethe Universität Frankfurt.

In 2008, she held a Secularity and Value Lecture at the London School of Economics, in 2009 the García Máynez Lectures at the Universidad Autónoma de Mexico (Ciudad de Mexico, D.F.), in 2011 she held the Spinoza chair at the University of Amsterdam, and in 2012–13, she was a Fellow at the Berlin Institute for Advanced Study.

== Work ==
Lafont's current research focuses on normative questions in political philosophy concerning democracy and citizen participation, global governance, human rights, religion and politics. She works in a framework of deliberative democratic theory, where she defends a participatory construal of the democratic ideal against proposals to insulate political decision making from the influence of the citizenry. This conception requires the citizens to respect the priority of public reason over religious or otherwise comprehensive views in their political deliberations in the public sphere. At the level of global governance, she argues against the current state-centric understanding of human rights obligations because of the protection gaps it leaves open. Instead, she advocates a more ambitious construal of the responsibility to protect (R2P) human rights, which she interprets as a provisional duty of the international community as a whole until appropriate institutions are in place to close these gaps.

The most elaborate and detailed account of her participatory conception of deliberative democracy is presented in her 2020 book Democracy Without Shortcuts. A participatory conception of deliberative democracy. In this book, she develops her position in critique of deep pluralist, recent elite or democratic epistocratic, and lootocratic approaches in democratic theory by demonstrating how each of them requires blind deference of those subject to decision-making to a group of decision-makers. The concept of "blind deference" is one of the key innovations of the book and refers to a kind of obedience that is not driven by reasons to accept or make decisions one's own and thus a form of subjection to others [cf. pp. 127–134]. Lafont argues that any theory requiring civic blind deference must therefore fall short of construing democracy as political self-government of the people. The book also proposes a new genuinely deliberative conception of the potential contribution of institutionalized mini-publics to improved democratic legitimation by helping to effectively produce a well-informed considered public opinion on complex political matters [ch. 5].

Lafont's work in critical theory elaborates on themes in the philosophy of Jürgen Habermas. Cristina Lafont's earlier philosophical work in the philosophy of language of Heidegger's hermeneutics issues in her identification of a specific form of "linguistic turn" (centered on the "world-disclosing" function of conceptual structures in language) in post-Kantian German philosophy between Hamann and Habermas. The upshot is that the systematic idealistic and constructivist tendency of this tradition is owed to a specific set of assumptions in its linguistic philosophy. In this work, she applies select tools from the theory of meaning developed in analytic philosophy of language to foundational issues from German Continental philosophy. This approach enables fruitful and precise comparisons between Robert Brandom's inferentialist framework and Habermas' theory of communicative action.

== Bibliography ==
- Democracy without Shortcuts. A Participatory Conception of Deliberative Democracy, Oxford/New York, Oxford University Press, 2020. ISBN 978-0-19-884818-9. German: Unverkürzte Demokratie Eine Theorie deliberativer Bürgerbeteiligung. transl. by Michael Adrian, Bettina Engels, Suhrkamp Verlag (1. ed.). Berlin. ISBN 978-3-518-58764-5. Spanish: Democracia sin atajos: una concepción participativa de la democracia deliberativa. transl. by Luis García Valiña, Madrid, Trotta. ISBN 978-84-1364-023-5.
- Global Governance and Human Rights (Spinoza Lectures Series), Amsterdam, van Gorcum, 2012. ISBN 978-90-232-5075-3.
- Habermas Handbuch, Stuttgart, Metzler Verlag, 2009. Co-edited with H. Brunkhorst and R. Kreide. ISBN 978-3-476-02239-4. (English: Columbia University Press, forthcoming; Chinese: Social Sciences Academic Press Beijing, forthcoming).
- Heidegger, Language and World-Disclosure, Cambridge, Cambridge University Press 2000. ISBN 978-0-521-66247-5. (German: Sprache und Welterschließung. Zur linguistischen Wende der Hermeneutik Heideggers, Frankfurt, Suhrkamp 1994. ISBN 978-3-518-58173-5; Spanish: Lenguaje y apertura del mundo, Madrid, Alianza Ed. 1997. ISBN 978-84-206-2892-9.)
- The Linguistic Turn in Hermeneutic Philosophy, Cambridge, MA, MIT Press 1999. ISBN 978-0-585-19009-9. (Spanish: La razón como lenguaje, Madrid, Machado Libros 1993. ISBN 978-84-7774-868-7. Chinese: Zhejiang University Press, forthcoming)
- “Against Anti-Democratic Shortcuts: A Few Replies to Critics,” The Journal of Deliberative Democracy, 16/2 (2020), 96-109. "Sovereignty and the International Protection of Human Rights", The Journal of Political Philosophy, doi:10.1111/jopp.12086
- “Are Human Rights Associative Rights? The Debate between Humanist and Political Conceptions of Human Rights Revisited", Critical Review of International Social and Political Philosophy (CRISSP) (2020), doi:10.1080/13698230.2020.1859221
- "Sovereignty and the International Protection of Human Rights", The Journal of Political Philosophy, doi:10.1111/jopp.12086
- "Philosophical Foundations of Judicial Review", in D. Dyzenhaus and M. Thornburn, eds., Philosophical Foundations of Constitutional Law, Oxford University Press, 2016. ISBN 978-0-19-106945-1.
- "Human Rights, Sovereignty, and the Responsibility to Protect", in Constellations 21/1 (2015), 68–78.
- "Deliberation, Participation, and Democratic Legitimacy: Should Deliberative Mini-publics Shape Public Policy?", in Journal of Political Philosophy, 23/1 (2015), 40–63.
- "Religious Pluralism in a Deliberative Democracy", in F. Requejo and C. Ungureanu, eds., Democracy, Law and Religious Pluralism in Europe, London: Routledge, forthcoming.
- "Agreement and Consent in Kant and Habermas: Can Kantian Constructivism be fruitful for Democratic Theory?" in The Philosophical Forum 43/3 (2012), 277–95.
- "Accountability and global governance: Challenging the state-centric conception of human rights," in Ethics & Global Politics, 3/3 (2010), 193–215.
- "Religion and the Public Sphere. What are the Deliberative Obligations of Democratic Citizenship?", in Philosophy & Social Criticism, 35/1-2 (2009), 127–50.
- "Alternative Visions of a New Global Order: What should Cosmopolitans hope for?", in Ethics & Global Politics 1/1-2 (2008), 1-20.
- "Meaning and Interpretation. Can Brandomian Scorekeepers be Gadamerian Hermeneuts?", in Philosophy Compass 2 (2007), 1-13.
- "Religion in the Public Sphere: Remarks on Habermas's Conception of Public Deliberation in Post-secular Societies", in Constellations, 14/2 (2007), 236–56.
- "Is the Ideal of a Deliberative Democracy Coherent?", in S. Besson and J.L. Martí (eds.), Deliberative Democracy and its Discontents, Aldershot: Ashgate, 2006, pp. 3–26.
