= András Hegedüs =

Hungarian politician (1922–1999)

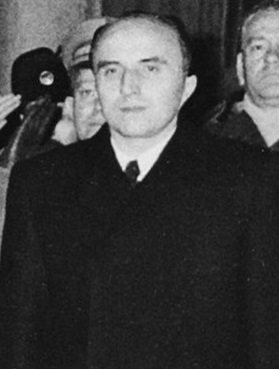
- Hegedüs in 1956

Chairman of the Council of Ministers of the People's Republic of Hungary
- In office 18 April 1955 – 24 October 1956
- Chairman of the Presidency: István Dobi
- First Secretary: Mátyás Rákosi Ernő Gerő
- Preceded by: Imre Nagy
- Succeeded by: Imre Nagy

Personal details
- Born: 31 October 1922 Szilsárkány, Kingdom of Hungary
- Died: 23 October 1999 (aged 76) Budapest, Hungary
- Party: Hungarian Communist Party, Hungarian Working People's Party, Hungarian Socialist Workers' Party
- Occupation: Politician, sociologist

András Hegedüs (Note: Hungarian pronunciation: [ˈɒndraːʃ ˈhɛɡɛdyʃ]) (31 October 1922 – 23 October 1999) was a Hungarian Communist politician who served as Chairman of the Council of Ministers from 1955 to 1956. He fled to the Soviet Union on 28 October, the fifth day of the Hungarian Revolution of 1956, but returned in 1958 and taught sociology.

== Early years ==
Coming from a poor family, he finished high school in Sopron at the Evangelical Academy. Hegedüs first became involved in the underground communist movement during his university years and became a member of illegal Hungarian Communist Party when he studied railway engineering at Budapest Technical University in 1942. He was not able to finish his studies and was put under house arrest in the August 1944 for two years but managed to escape at the end of November. He became part of the interim government on 24 June 1945.

== 1945–1990 ==
In 1947 he married Zsuzsanna Hölzel (1922–1998); they had six children. From 1948 onwards Hegedüs became involved with the Hungarian Working People's Party eventually taking on leading roles. From the early 1950s he took on numerous ministerial portfolios. This culminated on 18 April 1955, when he was named Prime Minister after party leader Mátyás Rákosi forced out Imre Nagy. When the Kremlin frowned on Rákosi returning to the premiership he'd held from 1952 to 1953, Hegedüs took the post. Aged 32 at the time of his appointment, he was the youngest Prime Minister in Hungarian history.

András Hegedüs in the Parliament in summer 1956.

After signing the document asking Soviet troops for assistance during the revolution on 24 October, the government and people overwhelmingly supported him handing power back to Nagy. He became the most hated man in Hungary and was advised to flee by Soviet ambassador Yuri Andropov to the Soviet Union along with other Hungarian hardliners such as Ernő Gerő. In Moscow, he worked as part of the philosophy department at the Soviet Academy of Sciences between 1957 and 1958. In the November 1956 the interim committee of the Communist Party expelled him, but by September 1958 he was able to return home.

From the late 1950s he held numerous academic posts and worked in various research institutes: 1958–1961: Hungarian Academy of Sciences (HAS) Economic Institute 1961–1963: Central Statistics Institute 1963–1968: Founded and led the HAS Sociology Research Institute 1966: Karl Marx Economics University 1968–1973: Industry Studies

In 1968 he objected to the Warsaw Pact invasion of Czechoslovakia during the Prague Spring. He was dismissed from his position at the Sociology Research Institute and later in 1973 was expelled from the Communist Party for his differing political and ideological views. He became a pensioner from 1975 to 1982 when he was allowed to teach at the Economics University.

== Post-communism ==
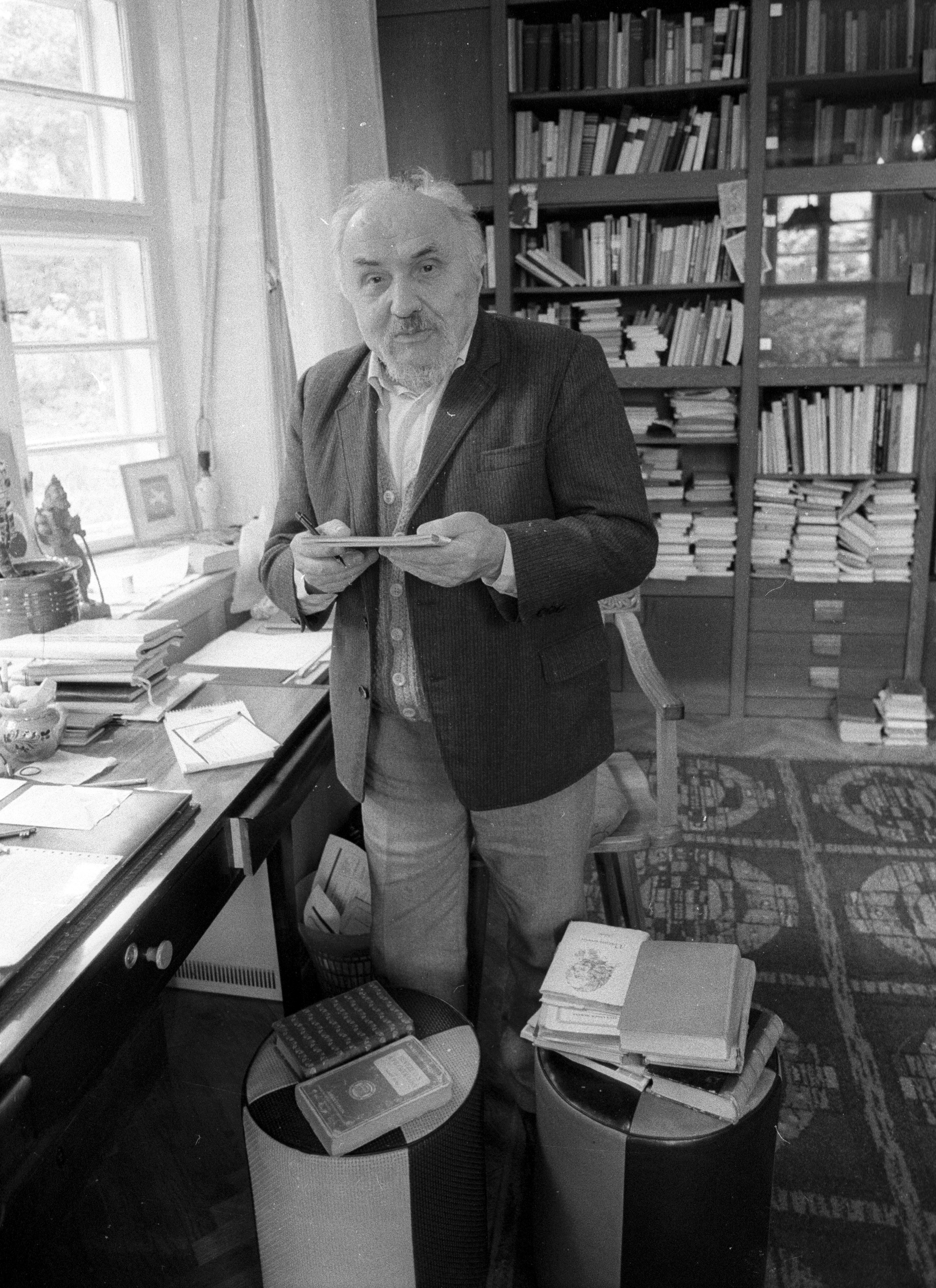
András Hegedüs in 1990

Following the collapse of Communism in 1990, Hegedüs founded the Worker's Academy. He was often interviewed about the events of 1956 by local and foreign news teams, as he was one of the few survivors from the government of that time. He died on the anniversary of the start of the Hungarian revolution.

== Selected publications ==
=== Books ===
- Socialism and Bureaucracy (Motive series), London: Allison & Busby, 1976.
- The Structure of Socialist Society (Sociology and Social Welfare series), London: Constable, 1977.
- Hegedüs András. Élet egy eszme árnyékában ("Life in the shadow of an ideology"). Bethlen Gábor Publishing House. 1989. Budapest ISBN 963-02-7200-8 (A slightly modified version of this book was published in 1985 in English.)

=== Essays ===
- with Maria Markus. "Modernization and the Alternatives of Social Progress". Telos 17 (Fall 1973). New York: Telos Press

== Notes ==
Political offices
Preceded by Ferenc Erdei	Minister of Agriculture; 1953–1954	Succeeded by Ferenc Erdei
Preceded by Imre Nagy	Prime Minister of Hungary; 1955–1956	Succeeded by Imre Nagy
