= List of Heroes of the Russian Federation (N) =

This is a list of people who have been awarded the title Hero of the Russian Federation.

It has been awarded more than 970 times, of which more than 440 were posthumously.

== List of Heroes of the Russian Federation ==
- Gasan Nadzhafov (ru)
- Ruslan Nalgiev (ru)
- Sergey Natochy (ru)
- Yuri Naumov (ru)
- Yuri Nedviga (ru)
- Vladimir Nedobezhkin (ru)
- Pavel Nemtsov (ru)
- Mikhail Nemytkin (ru)
- Andrey Nepryakhin (ru)
- Igor Nerestyuk (ru)
- Yuri Nesterenko (ru)
- Vitaly Netyksa (ru)
- Sergey Nefyodov (ru)
- Vitaly Neff (ru)
- Ivan Nechaev (ru)
- Yuri Nikitich (ru)
- Aleksandr Nikishin (ru)
- Dmitry Nikishin (ru)
- Aleksandr Nikulin (ru)
- Aleksey Novikov (ru)
- Vasily Novikov (ru)
- Yan Novikov (ru)
- Oleg Novitsky
- Dmitry Novosyolov (ru)
- Yevgeny Novosyolov (ru)
- Sergey Novokhatsky (ru)
- Viktor Nosov
- Vasily Nuzhny (ru)
- Magomed Nurbagandov (ru)
- Vladimir Nurgaliev (ru)
