= Dmitri Nikulin =

American philosopher (born 1962)

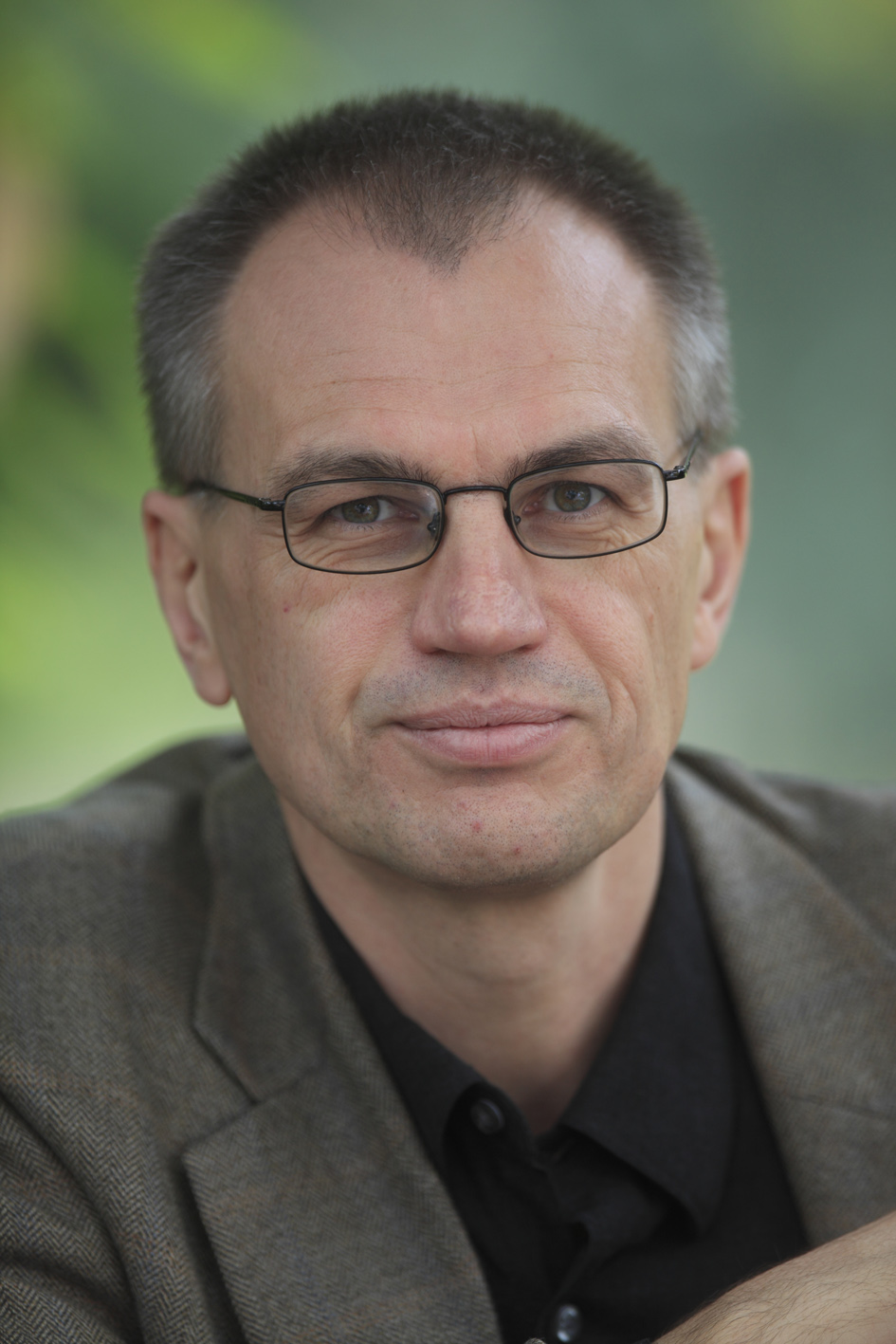
- Nikulin in 2009

Dmitri V. Nikulin (born 1962) is a philosopher and the Agnes Heller Research Professor of Philosophy at The New School for Social Research in New York City, U.S. He has been a visiting professor at the École pratique des hautes études, Paris and the École des hautes études en sciences sociales, Paris. He has been a Fellow at the Alexander von Humboldt Foundation in Tübingen, Heidelberg, and Bonn-Bad Godesberg, Germany, at the University of Notre Dame, Indiana, and at the Forschungskolleg Humanwissenschaften in Bad Homburg, Germany.

== Published works ==
=== Books ===
- Metaphysik und Ethik. Theoretische und praktische Philosophie in Antike und Neuzeit. München: C. H. Beck, 1996. ISBN 3406411665
- Matter, Imagination and Geometry: Ontology, Natural Philosophy, and Mathematics in Plotinus, Proclus, and Descartes. Ashgate, 2002. ISBN 978-0754615743
- On Dialogue. Lexington, 2006. ISBN 978-0-7391-1139-0
- Dialectic and Dialogue. Stanford University Press, 2010. ISBN 9780804770163
- Comedy, Seriously: A Philosophical Study. Palgrave Macmillan, 2014. ISBN 978-1-349-49051-6
- The Concept of History. Bloomsbury, 2017. ISBN 9781474269117
- Neoplatonism in Late Antiquity. Oxford University Press, 2019. ISBN 9780190662363
- Facets of Modernity: Reflections on Fractured Subjectivity. Rowman & Littlefield, 2020. ISBN 978-1-78661-505-3
- Critique of Bored Reason: On the Confinement of the Modern Condition. Columbia University Press, 2022. ISBN 9780231189071
- Non-Being In Ancient Thought . Oxford University Press, 2025. ISBN 978-0197781616

=== Edited volumes ===
- The Other Plato. SUNY Press, 2012. ISBN 9781438444109
- Memory: A History. Oxford University Press, 2015. ISBN 9780199793839
- Philosophy and Political Power in Antiquity (co-edited with Cinzia Arruzza). Brill, 2016. ISBN 978-90-04-32461-9
- Productive Imagination: Its History, Meaning and Significance (co-edited with Saulius Geniusas). Rowman & Littlefield, 2018. ISBN 978-1-78660-431-6
