= György Bence =

Hungarian philosopher (1941–2006)

György Bence (Budapest, 8 December 1941 – 28 October 2006, Budapest) was a university professor, philosopher, dissident and political consultant.

In 1979 he was among the first Hungarians who criticized together with Andrei Sakharov and others the Soviet crackdown on the Czech Charter 77 signatories.

Later he was among the founding members of the International Helsinki Federation for Human Rights. He was founding editor-in-chief of the Budapesti Könyvszemle (1989–1995).

== Publications ==
- Szabaditó börtön (Liberal Prison) / irta, Bence György (1940s?)

== See also ==
- János Kis
