= István Eörsi =

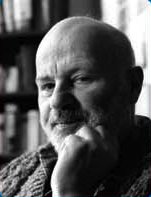
István Eörsi

István Eörsi (Hungarian: [ˈiʃtvaːn ˈørʃi]; 16 June 1931, in Budapest – 13 October 2005, in Budapest) was a Hungarian writer, novelist, political essayist, poet and literature translator.

He was born in educated Jewish family. After completing English and German literature studies in Budapest he worked as a school teacher. Beginning in early youth, he wrote articles for communist newspaper, claimed to be a Marxist, and wrote a poem on the occasion of death of Joseph Stalin.

Eörsi was part of the Hungarian minority that welcomed the Red Army, when the Russians invaded his country. He was one of those who looked on the Russians as liberators and not enemies. Although most of these Russian supporters were disillusioned after the rise to power of Stalin, Eörsi found new opportunities in this time of uncertainty. Even as a schoolboy, Eörsi published poems that sang the praises of the communist government.

In later years, he was an opponent of the proletariat's dictatorship and an oppositionist. Because of his participation in 1956 uprising he was sentenced to eight years in prison, of which he served three and a half (until the 1960 amnesty). After his release he was banned from publication, because of which he concentrated on translating works of Goethe, Heine, Brecht, Shakespeare, Ginsberg, Shelley, Keats, Pushkin, Jandl and Lorca.

In 1983 and 1984 he lived in West Berlin on a DAAD (German for Deutscher Akademischer Austauschdienst) scholarship. After the fall of communism in Hungary in 1989, Eörsi criticized the revival of nationalism. He was a founder member of SZDSZ, but left because of ideological differences.

Eörsi's literary style was marked by his ideological stance, and it often bore his political zeal in the form of sarcasm. His writings tended to be volatile as well as passionate, especially when he wrote on political issues. In later years, Eörsi's writing mellowed somewhat. But his work always bore the mark of two things: First, a revisionist form of Marxism he learned from his teacher, György Lukács; second, his experiences of the 1956 Hungarian revolution, which got him in jail.

== Imprisonment ==
Eörsi's commitment to his ideology, and the expression of it in verse, landed him in prison. He was arrested in December 1956 on the charge of incitement. During his trial two anti-Soviet poems, which had appeared in the clandestine journal Elunk (We Are Alive) some weeks earlier, were used as evidence. He was handed an eight-year prison sentence. However, he only spent 42 months in jail, as he received an amnesty and was released in 1960.

== Works ==
Eörsi's second poem anthology, entitled To Pummel the Devil!, was published shortly before his arrest. His arrest meant that the book had to be withdrawn from circulation. This withdrawal marked a barren era for Eörsi, whose works had to wait another 12 years to be published again. While the ban on him lasted, Eörsi earned a living working as a freelance journalist. He also made a living working as an assistant to Lukacs, whose books he translated from German into Hungarian. Eörsi's relationship with the old philosopher was more than a professional one. They developed a strong friendship, and the two recorded numerous frank conversations, which were published in 1989 as Taped Biography.

In 2005 he was awarded the Kossuth Prize, regarded as the most prestigious cultural award in Hungary.

The same year he died from leukemia.
