= Mihály András Vajda =

Hungarian leftist intellectual (1935–2023)

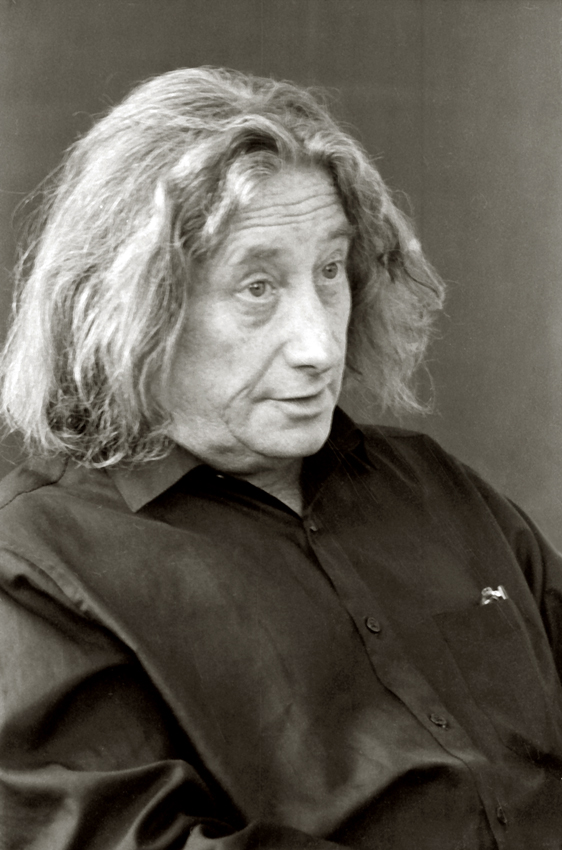
- Born: 10 February 1935; Budapest, Kingdom of Hungary
- Died: 27 November 2023 (aged 88); Budapest, Hungary

Philosophical work
- Era: 20th-century philosophy
- Region: Western philosophy
- School: Continental philosophy Budapest School
- Main interests: Political philosophy

Mihály András Vajda (10 February 1935 – 27 November 2023) was a Hungarian leftist intellectual who took part in the debates surrounding the development of national socialism, Marxism–Leninism, and the state of capitalism in the latter half of the 20th century.

Involved in politics in his home country of Hungary, Vajda was expelled along with several other scholars from the Hungarian Socialist Workers' Party in 1973 due to allegedly representing views that were "opposed to Marxism–Leninism and to the policy of the Hungarian Socialist Workers' Party."

Vajda was one of the original members of Georg Lukács's "Budapest School", Hungarian theorists who began as neo-Marxists but moved on to what they called post-Marxist and also post-modern perspectives. Writing primarily in Hungarian, but with many works translated into English, Vajda's works treat such themes as the past and future of state socialism in Europe and fascism as a mass phenomenon. Vajda continues to draw, like other members of the original Budapest School, from a Marxist legacy in seeking to examine the state of contemporary liberal society. In 2011, he was involved in a controversy concerning critical remarks made respecting the Hungarian government, and specifically government policies that challenged free media. In a notable show of support for Vajda and his colleague fellow Hungarian theorist Ágnes Heller, Jürgen Habermas and Julian Nida-Rümelin wrote a public appeal in defense of Vajda and Heller, insisting that "We are concerned about the political and professional fate of our Hungarian colleagues... Under the nationalist government, which has used its two-thirds majority to erode the Hungarian constitution, they are again exposed to political persecution."

Vajda died on 27 November 2023, at the age of 88.

== Academic career ==
In 1973, the members of the Budapest School as ideological dissenters lost their jobs and were banned from publication. Some members of the group left Hungary, and Vajda went as a visiting professor to different universities in different countries: first at the University of Bremen (Germany), then at the New School for Social Research in New York, next to the Trent University in Peterborough in Canada, and finally (after his rehabilitation in Hungary) to the University of Siegen (Germany). Only in 1989 was he officially rehabilitated in Hungary and appointed to the chair of philosophy at Kossuth Lajos University in Debrecen, where he served from 1996 to 2000 as Director of the Institute of Philosophy, as well. He was appointed a member of the Hungarian Academy of Sciences in 2002. In 2004, he took the Franz Rosenzweig visiting professor at the University of Kassel.

== Selected works ==
- Fascism as a Mass Movement (Allison and Busby, 1976, ISBN 9780850311761)
- The State and Socialism: Political Essays (Allison and Busby, 1981)
- The Crisis of Cultural Criticism (In German) (Verlag, 1996)

== Notable journal articles ==
- "Family Structure and Communism" (TELOS, Spring 1971)
- "Marxism, Existentialism, Phenomenology: A Dialogue" (TELOS, Spring 1971)
- "On Fascism" (TELOS, Summer 1971)
- "Crisis and the Way Out: The Rise of Fascism in Italy and Germany" (TELOS, Summer 1972)
- "Lukacs' and Husserl's Critiques of Science" (TELOS, Winter 1978-79) PDF Available
