= Thesis Eleven =

- Discipline: Sociology
- Language: English
- Edited by: Peter Beilharz

Publication details
- History: 1980–present
- Publisher: SAGE Publications (Australia)
- Frequency: Bimonthly

Standard abbreviations
- ISO 4: Thesis Eleven

Indexing
- ISSN: 0725-5136 (print); 1461-7455 (web)
- LCCN: 91640863
- OCLC no.: 9911231

Links
- Journal homepage; Thesis Eleven at SAGE Journals

Thesis Eleven: Critical Theory and Historical Sociology is a peer-reviewed academic journal that publishes six issues a year in the field of sociology. It has been in publication since 1980 and is currently published by SAGE Publications.

== Scope ==
Thesis Eleven publishes articles on social theory, with an multidisciplinary approach covering areas in the social sciences and humanities such as sociology, anthropology and philosophy. Thesis Eleven focuses on critical theories of modernity with a continental and transatlantic focus.

== History and editors ==
One of the journal's Founding Editors, Peter Beilharz (Curtin University, Perth, Australia) remains on the editorial board for the journal. There are thirteen other editors (including managing, review and production editors), along with an Editorial Advisory Board.

The Thesis Eleven Centre for Cultural Sociology (originally the Thesis Eleven Centre for Critical Theory) was established in 2001 at La Trobe University. One of the aims of the Centre was to promote Thesis Eleven, with Peter Beilharz and Trevor Hogan as the Director and Deputy Director. The Centre ceased operating in 2014.

The National Library of Australia holds Peter Beilharz's papers, which include material related to the founding of the journal and the associated centre.

== Abstracting and indexing ==
Thesis Eleven is abstracted and indexed in many databases, including:

- Academic Search
- Clarivate Analytics: Emerging Sources Citation Index
- IBZ: International Bibliography of Periodical Literature
- International Political Science Abstracts
- Scopus
- MasterFILE Premier
- Worldwide Political Science Abstracts
- Web of Science
