= Dmytro Delyatytskyi =

Ukrainian major general

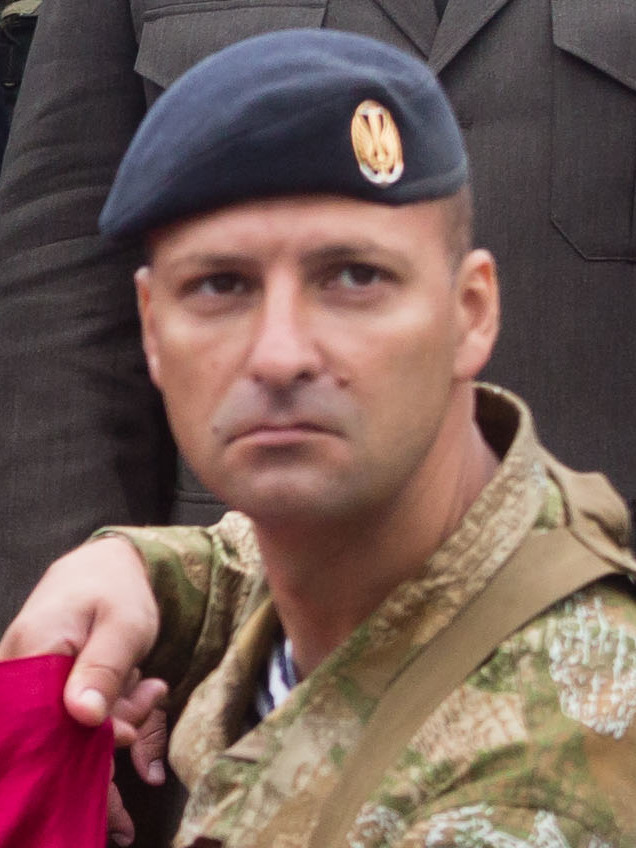
- Delyatytskyi in 2016
- Native name: Дмитро Делятицький
- Born: 14 August 1976 (age 49); Khabarovsk, Russian SFSR, Soviet Union
- Allegiance: Ukraine
- Branch: Ukrainian Marine Corps
- Service years: 1997–present
- Rank: Major general
- Commands: Commander of the Marine Corps; 30th Amphibious Corps; Odesa Military Academy; 36th Marine Brigade; 1st Marine Battalion
- Conflicts: Russo-Ukrainian War
- Education: Odesa Military Academy

Dmytro Yevhenovych Delyatytskyi (Ukrainian: Дмитро Євгенович Делятицький; born 14 August 1976) is a Ukrainian major general who has been the commander of the Ukrainian Marine Corps and concurrently the 30th Amphibious Corps since 2024.

He previously commanded the 1st Marine Battalion during the annexation of Crimea by the Russian Federation and the 36th Marine Brigade during the Donbass War. He was later the deputy commander of the Marine Corps Command from 2018 to 2023 and commander of the Odesa Military Academy from 2023 to 2024.

== Early life and education ==
Delyatytskyi was born in Khabarovsk to a Soviet military family and lived in the Russian Far East and in the north of Russia before moving to Ukraine. After Ukrainian independence he joined the country's military and graduated from the Odesa Institute of the Ground Forces.

== Military career ==
Lieutenant Colonel Delyatytskyi was the commander of Ukraine's only marine unit, the 1st Marine Battalion, near Feodosia, Crimea, in 2014. When the Russian Federation annexed Crimea, Delyatytskyi led about two companies of marines that kept their oath of loyalty to Ukraine back to the Ukrainian mainland, where they were based in Mykolaiv. This was after they were captured and briefly detained by the Russian forces, who let them go.

Over next few years the Naval Infantry was expanded and one of the first units that was formed was the 36th Marine Brigade. It was established on the basis of the Navy's 36th Coastal Defense Brigade, and Delyatytskyi served as the commander of the new marine brigade from 2015 until 2018. The unit consisted of the Ukrainian marines that had left Crimea, former members of the original Coastal Defense Brigade, and volunteers that joined after it was formed.

In the spring of 2018, when the Ukrainian Navy established a new Marine Corps Command and began reforming the Ukrainian Naval Infantry along the lines of the United States Marine Corps, Delyatytskyi became its deputy commander. He was promoted to colonel at some point, and then to brigadier general on 6 December 2021 and to major general on 24 August 2023. In 2023 he became the director of the Odesa Military Academy, his alma mater.

On 11 February 2024 Delyatytskyi became the commander of the Ukrainian Marine Corps after his predecessor Yurii Sodol was made the commander of the Joint Forces of the Armed Forces.

== Awards ==
- Cross of Military Merit (20 February 2025)
- Order of Danylo Halytsky (21 August 2014)
- Order of Bohdan Khmelnytsky, 1st class (24 May 2022)
- Order of Bohdan Khmelnytsky, 2nd class (26 March 2022)
- Order of Bohdan Khmelnytsky, 3rd class (17 May 2019)
- Medal "10 years of the Armed Forces of Ukraine"
- Medal "For Honest Service" 2nd class
- Medal "For Honest Service" 3rd class
- Anniversary Medal "90 years of the Naval Flag of Ukraine"

Military offices
Preceded by Oleksandr Konotopenko	Commander of the 1st Marine Battalion; 2012–2014	Succeeded by Volodymyr Baraniuk
Unit created	Commander of the 36th Marine Brigade; 2015–2018	Succeeded by Andrii Hnatov
Preceded by Artem Luchnykov	Deputy Commander of the Ukrainian Marine Corps; 2018–2023	Succeeded by Oleksii Androsov
Preceded by Oleksii Shevchenko	Director of the Odesa Military Academy; 2023–2024	Succeeded by Andrii Kovalchuk
Preceded by Yurii Sodol	Commander of the Ukrainian Marine Corps; 2024–present	Incumbent
