= Commander of the Marine Corps (Ukraine) =

Ukrainian naval rank

- Командир Корпусу морської піхоти

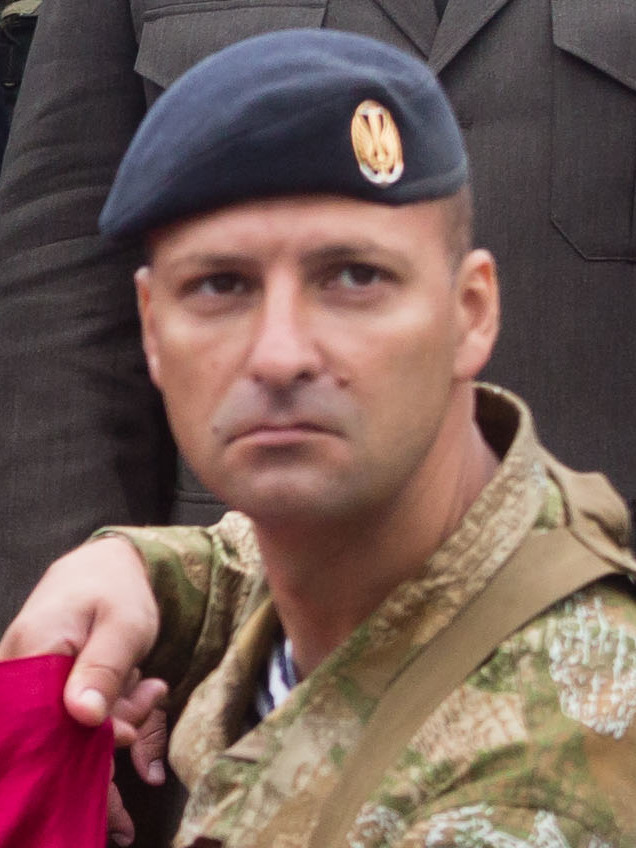
- Incumbent; Dmytro Delyatytskyi since 11 February 2024
- Ukrainian Marine Corps
- Abbreviation: Cmdr. MC
- Member of: General Staff of the Ukrainian Armed Forces
- Reports to: Commander-in-Chief of the Armed Forces
- Appointer: The president
- Formation: March 2018 (within Marine Command of the Ukrainian Navy); May 2023 (current form)

The commander of the marine corps (Ukrainian: Командир Корпусу морської піхоти, romanized: Komandyr Korpusu morskoyi pihoty, lit. 'commander of the naval infantry corps') is the general officer commanding the Ukrainian Marine Corps, the separate branch of the Ukrainian Armed Forces since 2023.

== History ==
In March 2018 the Marine Corps Command (Ukrainian: Командування морської піхоти, lit. 'Naval Infantry Command') was established within the Ukrainian Navy. In May 2023 it became a separate, then the seventh, branch of the Armed Forces of Ukraine (AFU).

== List of commanders ==
No.	Picture	Commander	Took office	Left office	Time in office	Ref.
1	Yurii Sodol	Lieutenant general Yurii Sodol (born 1970)	6 March 2018	11 February 2024	5 years, 342 days	
2	Dmytro Delyatytskyi	Major general Dmytro Delyatytskyi (born 1976)	11 February 2024	Incumbent	2 years, 208 days	

== See also ==
- Commander of the Navy (Ukraine)
- Commander of the Ground Forces (Ukraine)
- Commander of the Air Force (Ukraine)
- Commander of the Air Defence Forces (Ukraine)
- Commander of the Air Assault Forces (Ukraine)
