= BTR-80 =

Soviet armored personnel carrier

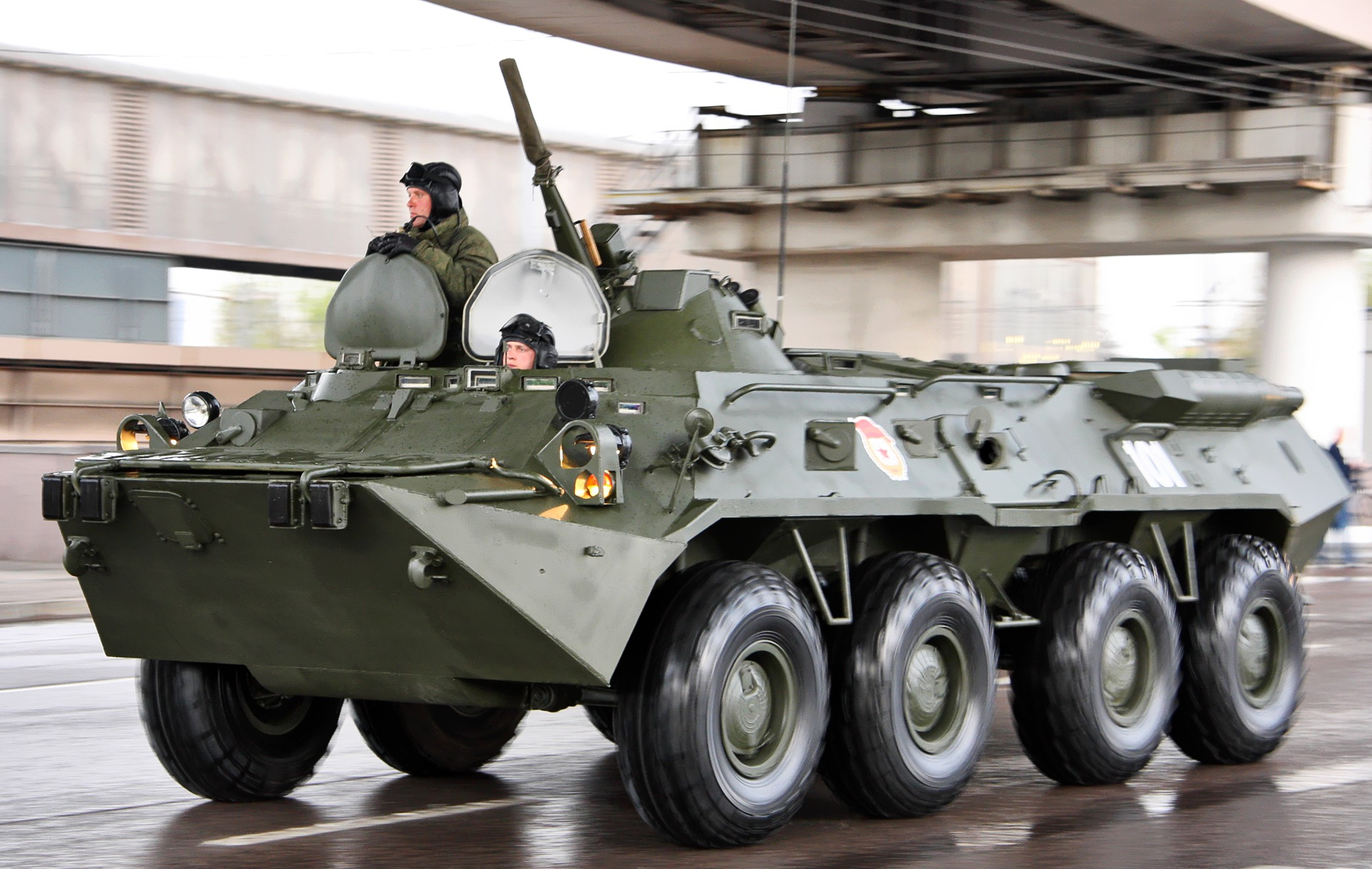
- A Russian BTR-80 during the 2011 Victory Day celebrations in Moscow
- Type: Amphibious armored personnel carrier Variants: Infantry fighting vehicle Self-propelled artillery
- Place of origin: Soviet Union

Service history
- In service: 1986–present
- Used by: See Operators
- Wars: Soviet–Afghan War; First Nagorno-Karabakh War; Georgian Civil War; Kurdish–Turkish conflict (1978–2025); Transnistria War; Tajikistan Civil War; War in Afghanistan; Iraq War; First Chechen War; War of Dagestan; Second Chechen War; Russo-Georgian War; Insurgency in the North Caucasus; Iraqi insurgency (2011–13); Sudanese conflict in South Kordofan and Blue Nile; Sri Lankan Civil War; War in Donbas; 2020 Nagorno-Karabakh conflict; Russo-Ukrainian war; United Nations Interim Force In Lebanon

Production history
- Manufacturer: Arzamas Machine-Building Plant, Nizhniy Novgorod
- Produced: 1984–present
- No. built: 5,000

Specifications
- Mass: 13.6 t (15.0 short tons; 13.4 long tons)
- Length: 7.7 m (25.3 ft)
- Width: 2.9 m (9.5 ft)
- Height: 2.41 m (7.9 ft)
- Crew: 3 (+7 passengers)
- Armor: 10 mm (hull); 7 mm (turret)
- Main armament: 14.5 mm KPVT machine gun or 30 mm 2A72
- Secondary armament: 7.62 mm PKT machine gun
- Engine: diesel KamAZ-7403; 260 hp (190 kW)
- Power/weight: 19 hp/tonne
- Suspension: wheeled 8×8
- Operational range: 600 km (372.8 mi)
- Maximum speed: 80–90 km/h (49.7–55.9 m/h) swim 10 km/h (6.2 m/h)

The BTR-80 (Russian: бронетранспортёр, romanized: bronetransportyor, lit. 'armoured carrier') is an 8×8 wheeled amphibious armoured personnel carrier (APC) designed in the Soviet Union. It was adopted in 1985 and replaced the previous vehicles, the BTR-60 and BTR-70, in the Soviet Army. It was first deployed during the Soviet–Afghan War. The BTR-80 was developed into the larger BTR-90 in the early 1990s.

== Description ==
The BTR-80 is based on the BTR-70 APC, which itself was based on the BTR-60. The BTR-80 is powered by a single 260-hp V-8 turbocharged water-cooled diesel engine, which offers increased performance and reliability over the twin gasoline engines installed in the BTR-60 and BTR-70 vehicles. The original engine was a 260-horsepower V-8 KamAZ-7403 engine, which was superseded by a 240-horsepower YaMZ-238M2 engine. The vehicle features power steering, a central tire-pressure regulating system, self-recovery winch, automatic fire suppression system in the engine compartment, a NBC system, and hydrojets for amphibious operations. The BTR-80 was designed and manufactured at the Arzamas Machinery Construction Factory, formerly Gorky Automobile Plant.

=== Capabilities ===
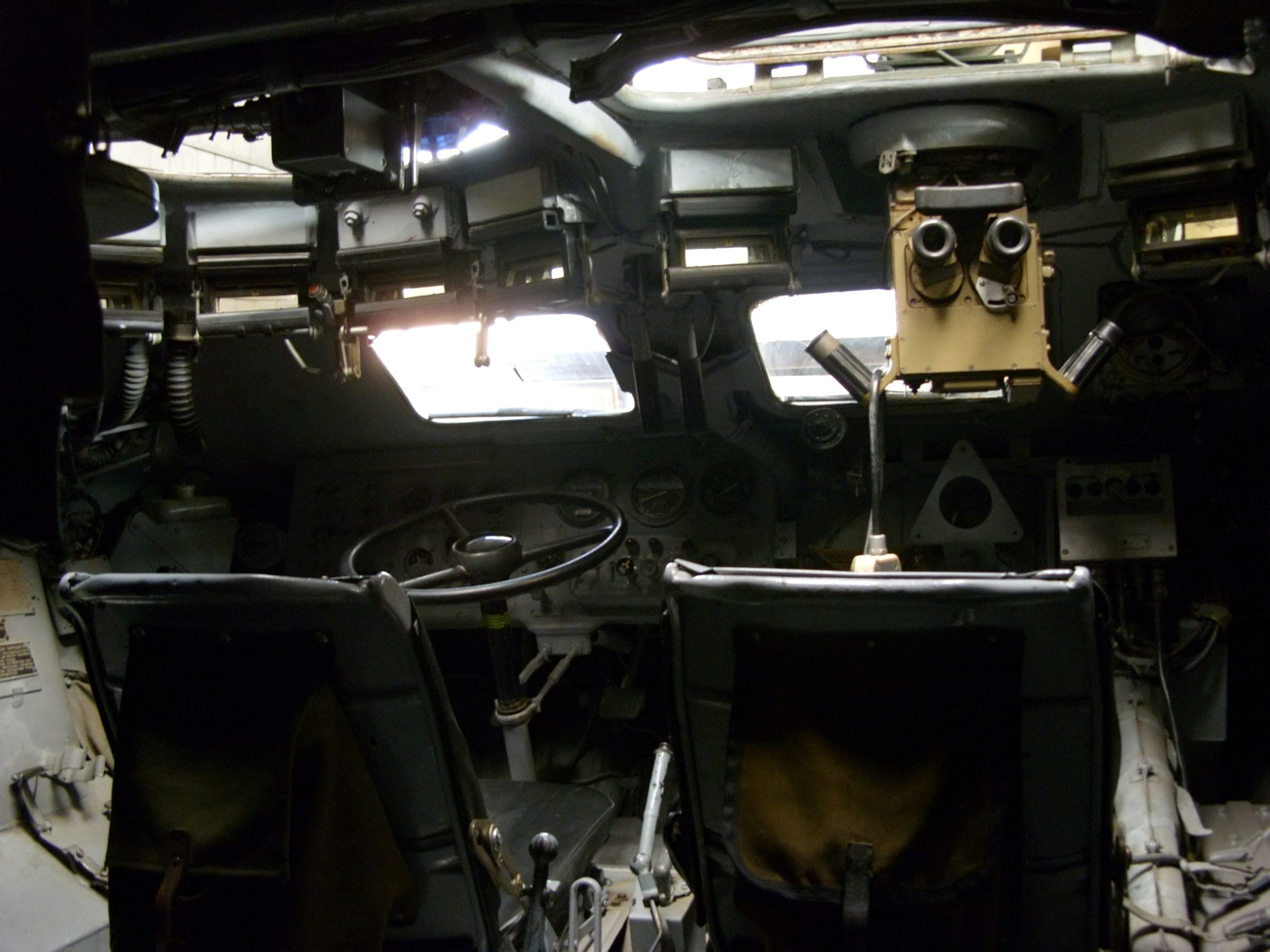
A BTR-80 interior

The vehicle mounts a one-man, manually operated BPU-1 turret, modified from earlier versions to allow for a +60° elevation to engage high elevation targets. The turret mounts a 14.5 mm (0.57 in) KPVT and coaxial 7.62 mm (0.3 in) PKT machine guns, sighted by a x4 daytime sighting system. Later BTR-80 variants mount a OU-ZGA2M spotlight for nighttime use. The hull has three firing ports on each side of the troop compartment, angled to permit forward firing. There is an additional firing port to the right of the commander's position, and a port in each roof hatch. The forward ports were designed for the squad's PKM general-purpose machine gun, while the remaining troops fired their AKMS or AK-74 weapons from the side ports. Ancillary fighting equipment includes TNPO vision blocks, TNP-B and TKN-3 optical devices for the driver and commander, an OU-3GA2M infrared search light, six 81 mm smoke grenade launchers 902V "Tucha", a radioset (R-173 or R-163-50U), and a crew intercom. The hull featured a new hatch between the second and third axles, which allowed for quicker and safer dismounts than the legacy BTRs. As with earlier variants, the welded steel armor on the BTR-80 was designed to protect occupants from shell fragments and small caliber bullets. The frontal arc was rated against 12.7mm armor piercing (AP) rounds at 100 meters; the upper hull against 7.62mm AP rounds at 100 meters; the lower hull against 7.62mm rounds at 750 meters

=== BTR-80A ===
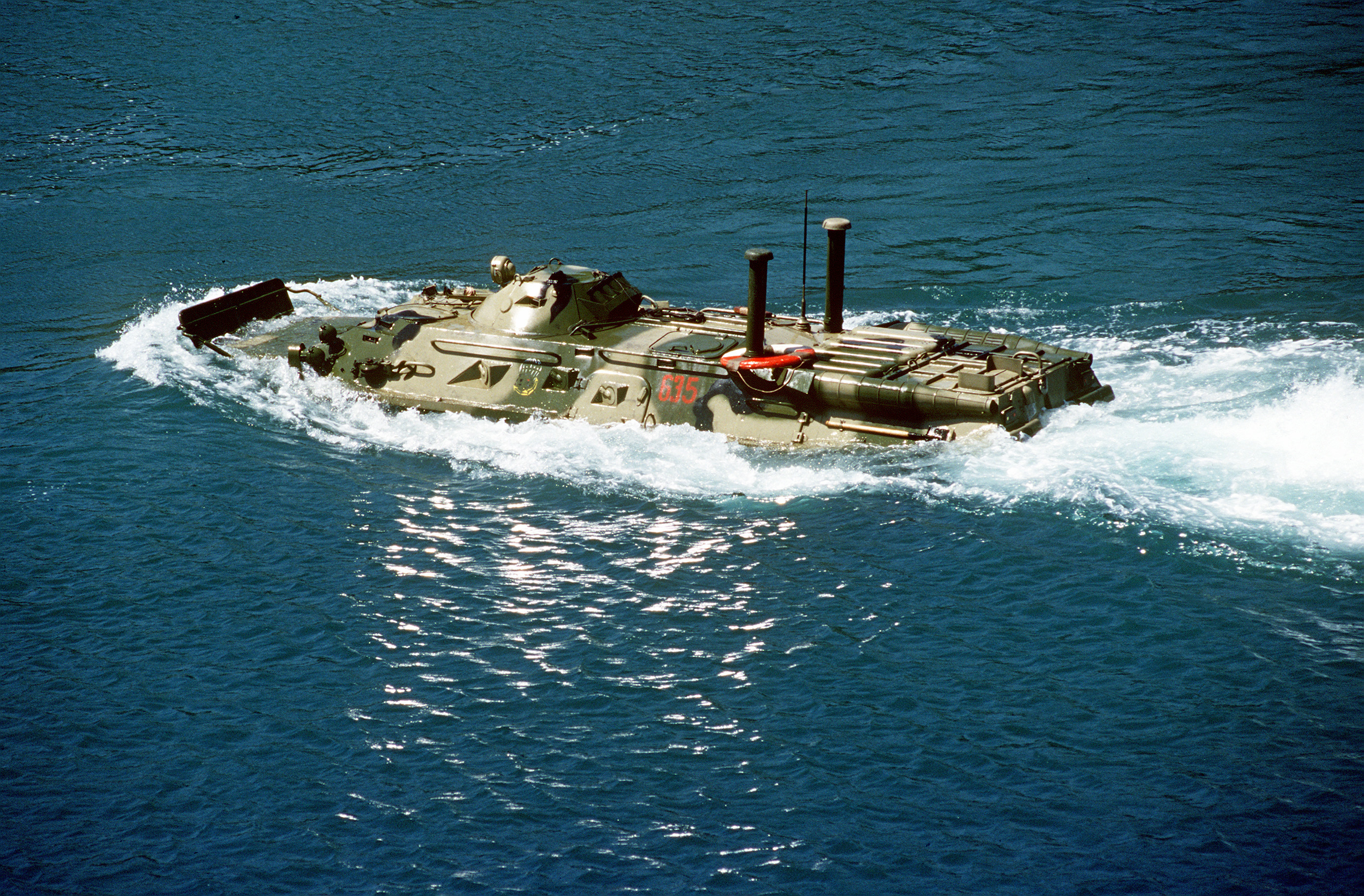
A Russian BTR-80 in water

An upgraded version, the BTR-80A, was fielded in 1994. This turret was upgraded with a Shipunov 30mm 2A72 gun (the same as mounted on the BMP-3) and coaxial 7.62mm PKTM machine gun, and six 81mm smoke grenade launchers. Thus equipped, the gunner can engage targets out to 2000 meters with armor-piercing tracer rounds, and 4000 meters using high-explosive incendiary rounds. The turret is powered and mounts the 1PZ-9 day sight, and TPN-3 night sight, which can be replaced with the TPN-3-42 long range night sight. The gunner also has a coaxial searchlight for nighttime engagements. The hull is laid out the same as the BTR-80, with commander and driver stations at the front, troop compartment in the middle, and engine at the rear. Modifications to the base BTR-80 and BTR-80A are detailed below.

== Variants ==
=== Russia ===
2S23 Nona-SVK self-propelled mortar-howitzer

- BTR-80 (GAZ-5903) – armored personnel carrier.
  - BTR-80K (GAZ-59031) (kommandnyj) – command vehicle APC with telescopic antenna mast, TNA-4 navigation device and R-163-50У series of radio equipment.
  - BTR-80M – an improved model with a 240 hp DMZ-238M2 engine, a slightly longer hull and new tires. In production since 1993. It is understood that only a small number were produced until the original engine was ready for production again.

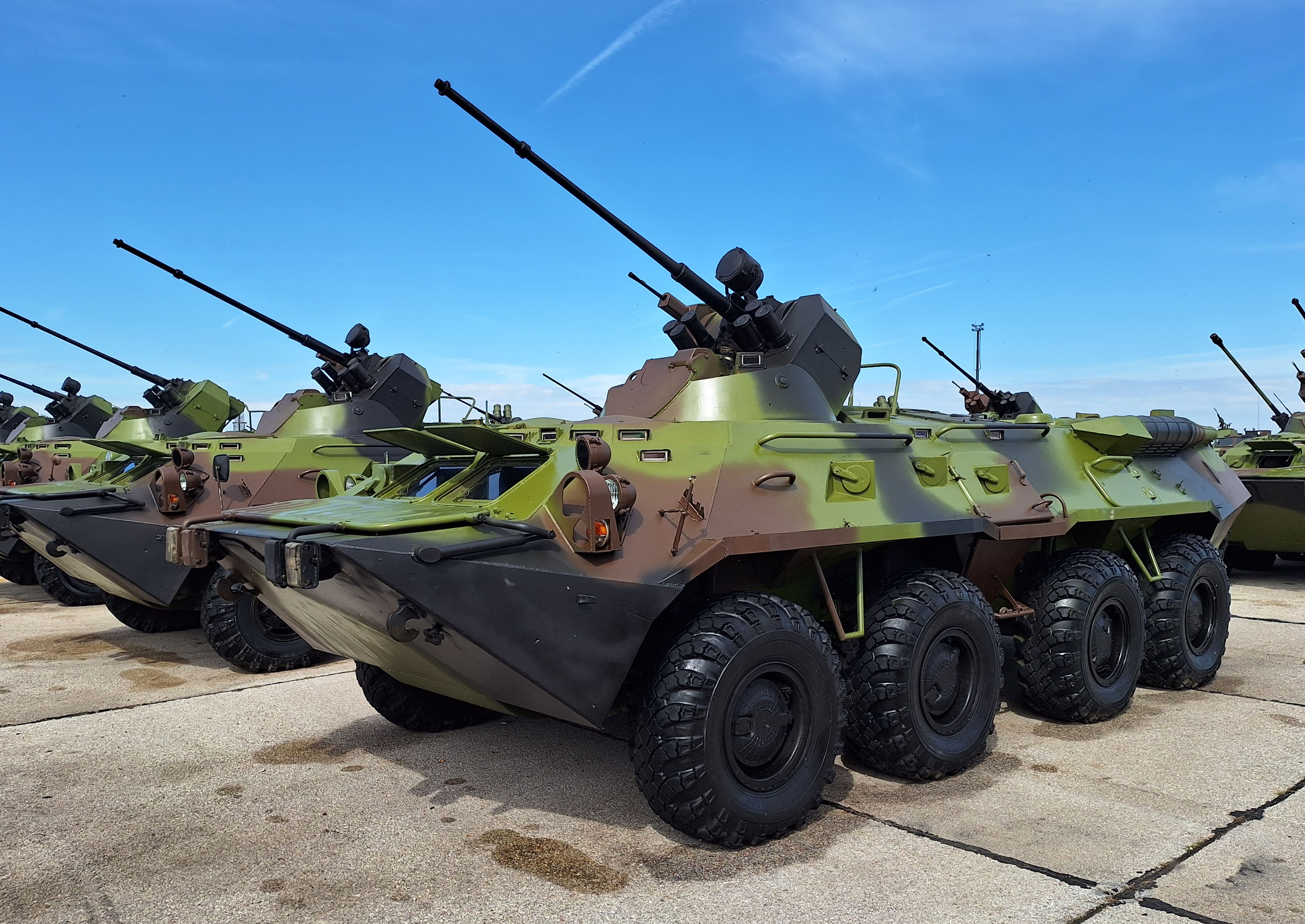
BTR-80As of the Serbian Armed Forces

- BTR-80A (GAZ-59034) – IFV with a 2A72 30 mm gun and 300 rounds as the primary weapon. The turret is called BPPU and is equipped with sights 1PZ-9 (day) and TPN-3 or TPN-3-42 "Kristall" (night). In production and service since 1994.
  - BTR-80S – variant of the BTR-80A for the Internal Troops of the MVD, equipped with a KPVT 14.5-mm machine gun and 7.62 mm PKT in the turret.
  - BTR-80AK – A command variant of the BTR-80A, with two whip antennas in the rear corners and with only one firing port on the right hull side.
    - BRDM-3 (bronirovannaya razvedivatel’no-dozornaya mashina) – An armoured reconnaissance/surveillance vehicle, based on the BTR-80AK and with a new day/night vision device in front of the commander's position. The crew consists of six men. In some Western sources, the name BRDM-3 is incorrectly used for the 9P148 ATGM carrier.
- BTR-82 – the latest production version with improved armour, spall liners, more modern night vision device TKN-4GA, GLONASS navigation system and a more powerful 300 hp engine. The original armament is retained but is now installed in the BPPU turret of the BTR-80A/BTR-82A. The BTR-82 prototype was shown for the first time in November 2009.
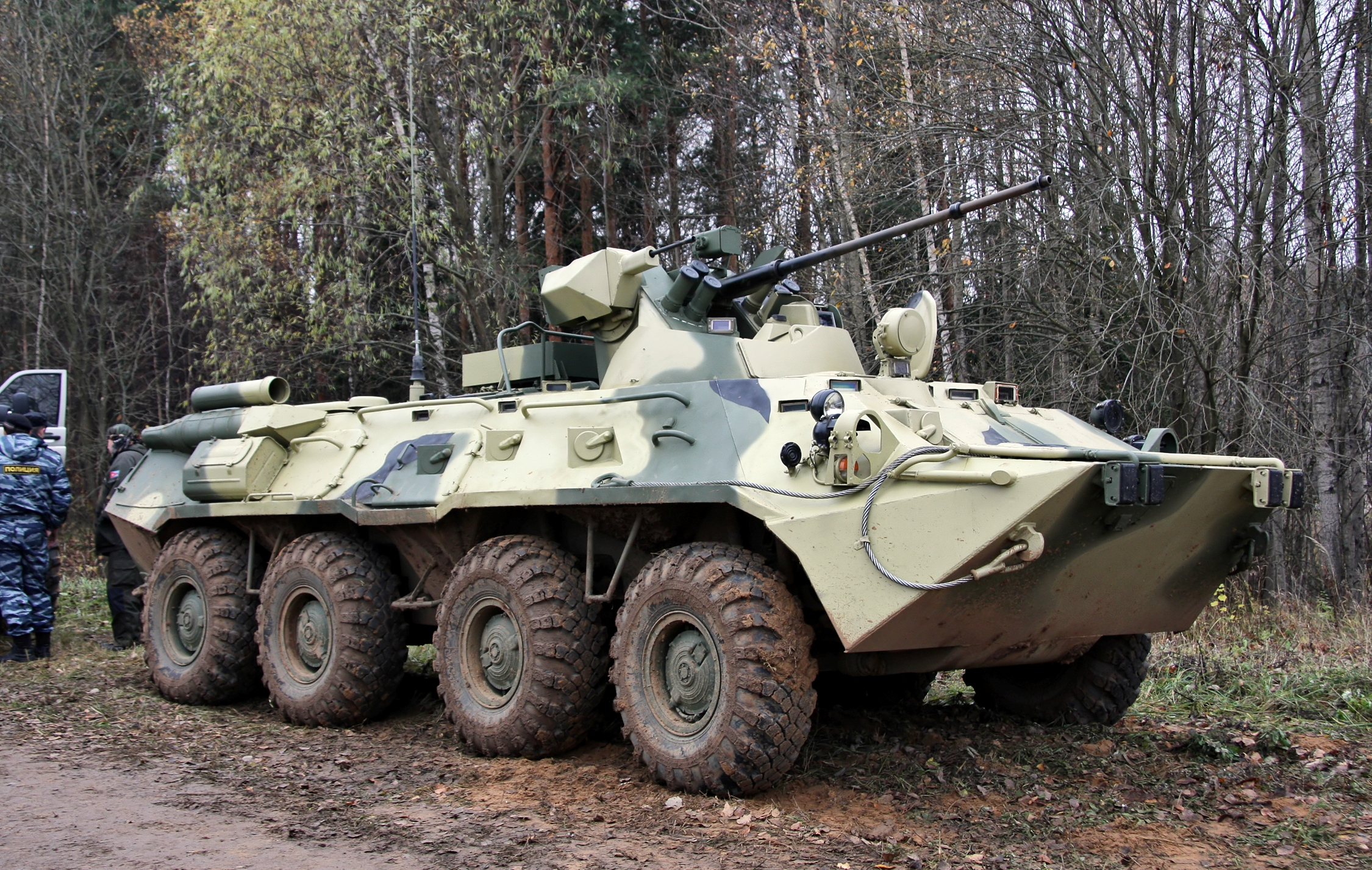
  - BTR-82A
    BTR-82A – the latest production version with improved armour, spall liners, a more modern night vision device TKN-4GA-02, 2A72 30 mm gun (lighter, less complex than the 2A42), GLONASS navigation system and a more powerful 300 hp engine. The prototype of the BTR-82A was shown for the first time in November 2009. The Russian Ministry of Defense adopted the BTR-82A in early 2013. In a Syrian government TV channel report, a BTR-82A was seen in battle in Syria around September 2015. The video showed BTR-82A crew members speaking Russian. Some military analysts and Russian opposition research groups, such as the Conflict Intelligence Group, claim that Russian armoured vehicle units were directly fighting anti-government groups in Syria. Russia integrated the AU-220M Baikal remote turret to the BTR-82A fitted with an autocannon firing the 57x348SR mm shells at 120 rpm. More ordered in August 2022. In July 2023, Russian Defense Minister Sergey Shoigu stated that the supplies of BTR-82A by Arzamas Machine-Building Plant had surged 4 times since early 2022. An upgraded version with enhanced ballistic and anti-mine protection was unveiled in August 2023.
  - BTR-82AM – Distinguished by a closed (welded) embrasure in the frontal part of the vehicle. The first batch was delivered in 2013. Used by naval infantry.
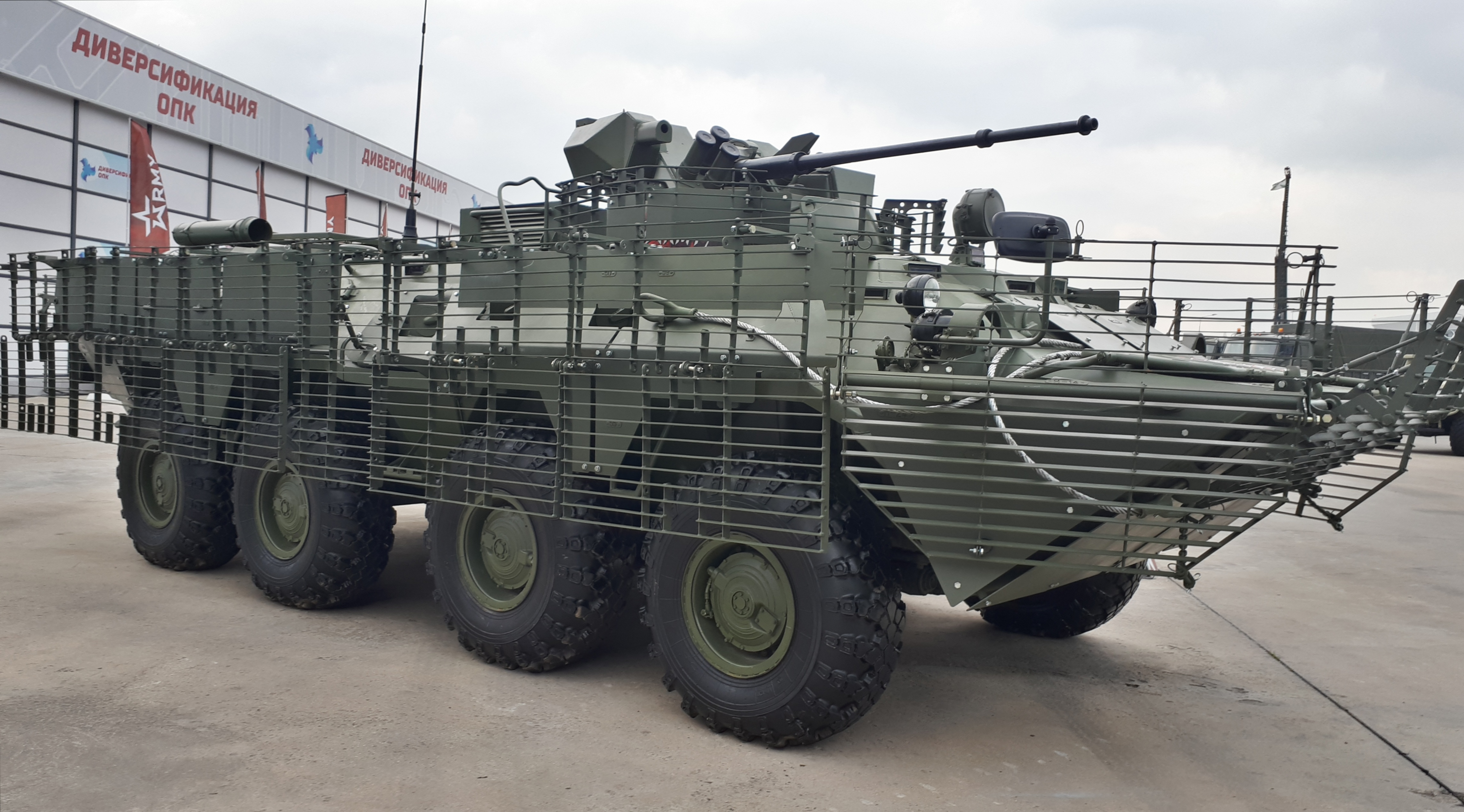
  - BTR-82AT
    BTR-82AT
  - BTR-87
  - BTR-82V
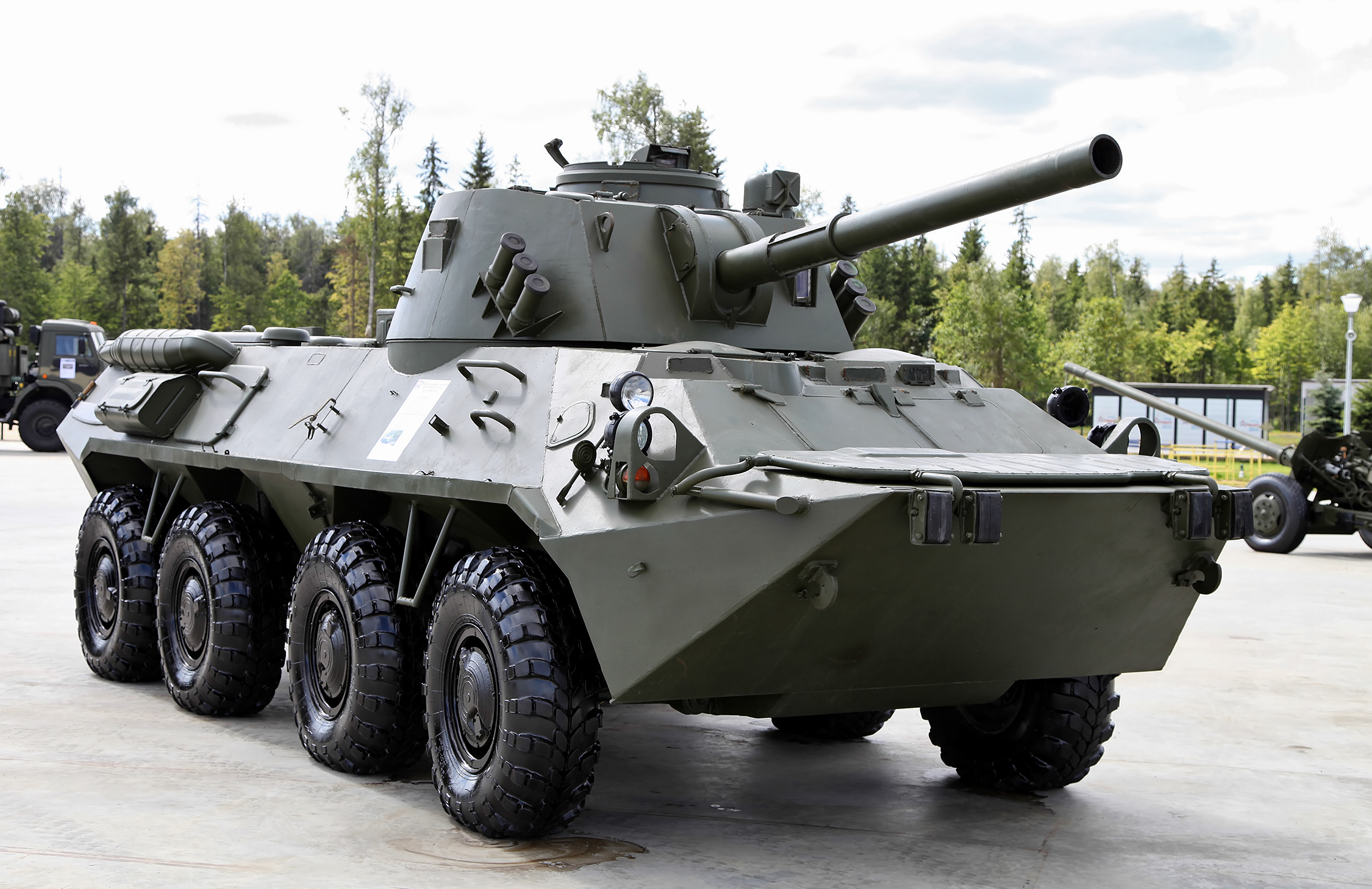
- 2S23 Nona-SVK
  2S23 "Nona-SVK" – fire support vehicle with the 120 mm 2A60 rifled gun-mortar – developed on the base of 2А51 rifled gun/mortar of the 2S9 Nona – and a crew of 4. Adopted in 1990.
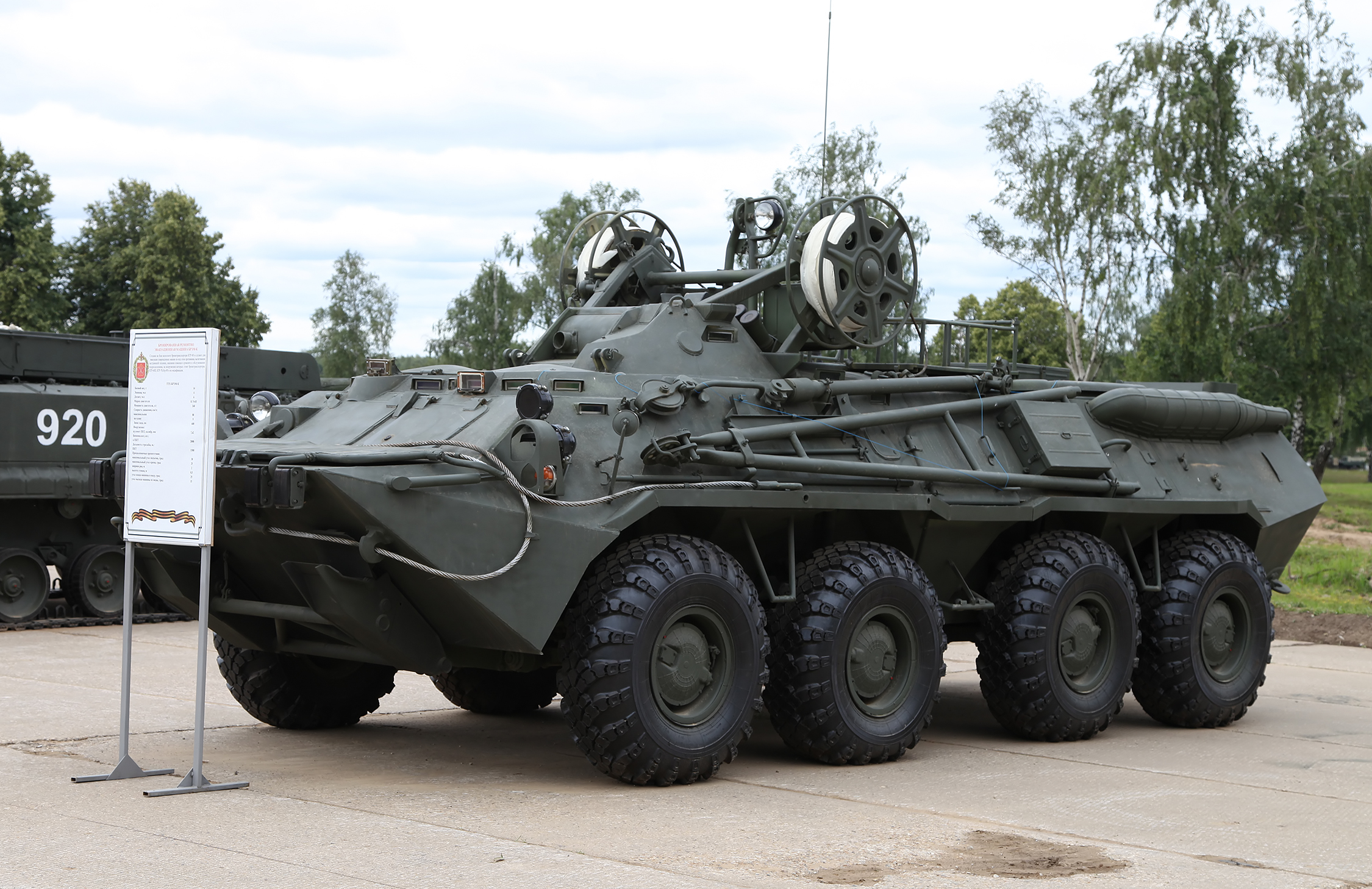
- BREM-K
  BREM-K (GAZ-59033) (bronirovannaya remontno-evakuatsionnaya mashina) – armoured recovery vehicle with towbars, a winch, welding equipment and a light crane.
- KM-80 or BTR-80 PBKM – command vehicle.
- RKhM-4 (razvedivatel’naya khimicheskaya mashina) – NBC reconnaissance vehicle with detection devices including the IMD-21BA and DP-5V, an automatic chemical alarm system GSA-12, a detection set for chemical agents KPKhR-3, an MK-3M meteo set, a KPO-1 sampling device, an ASP automatic detector and a KZO-2 flag dispenser to mark contaminated areas.
  - RKhM-4-01 – improved version with more modern equipment, including the GSA-13, IMD-1R, ASP-12 systems, a PGO-11 semi-automatic detection device, R-171M and R-173M radios instead of the older R-123M.
  - RKhM-4-02 – with upgraded detection systems such as the ASP-13, IMD-2NM and IMD-23, GSA-14; analysis, storage and interface unit UIK-RKhB and T-235-1U COMSEC equipment.
  - RKhM-6 "Povozka" – latest version with state-of-the-art detection systems, including the PRKhDD-2B with a detection range of about 3 km. The RKhM-6 is equipped with an SN-RKhM inertial navigation system and a 14Ts834 satellite navigation system. In service since 2011. Deployed to Syria in November 2018.
  - RPM-2 – A mobile radiological reconnaissance station with KRPI system. In service since 2000. Might also be known as NKR (nazemnij kompleks radiatsionnoj razvedki, "ground nuclear recon complex").
- R-149BMRA – command and signals vehicle.
- R-145BM1 – 5th generation command and signals vehicle. Entered service in 2015.
- R-439-BK1 – satellite communications vehicle.
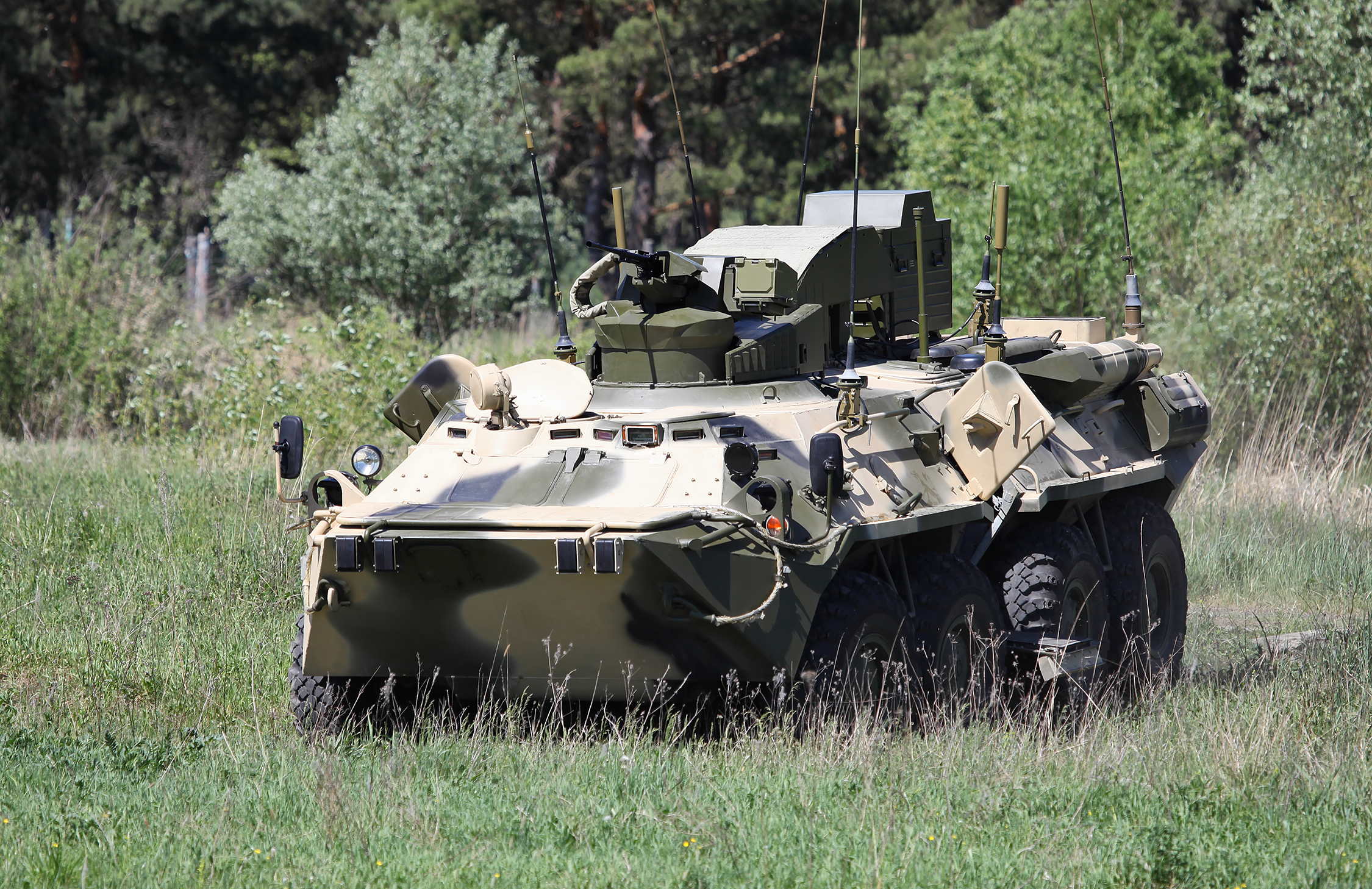
- BPDM Tajfun-M base security vehicle based on the BTR-80
  "BPDM 15TS56M Typhoon M" – new version for the Strategic Rocket units (RVSN), developed on the basis of the BTR-82 that will replace the base security vehicles MBP on BTR-60/70 chassis. Signal from the optoelectronic station displayed on liquid crystal screens; operator or commander can monitor the environment and attack the detected targets using the existing machine gun. The BTR-80 version is equipped with a new turret with a 7.62 mm machine gun, an Eleron-3SV unmanned aerial vehicle with a 5 km range, new optical and infrared bands observation device TKN-4S and a "Kredo-1" radar. In service since 2013. Around 70 vehicles were delivered in 2012–2020.
- ZS-88 (zvukoveshchatel’naya stantsiya) – PsyOps vehicle with loudspeaker set.
- ZS-96 (zvukoveshchatel’naya stantsiya) – PsyOps vehicle with loudspeaker set.
- K1Sh1 (GAZ-59032) – command post vehicle with bigger hull and unarmed turret. Also known as UNSh (unifitsirovannyj shassi, "unified chassis"). This version serves as the basis for several specialised vehicles. Estonia used this type as an APC with a machine gun turret.
  - BMM-80 "Simfoniya" (GAZ-59039) (bronirovannaya mnogofunktsionalnaya meditsinskaya mashina) – armoured ambulance, comes in three versions each of which can transport 9 patients, including two on stretchers on the rear hull (Developed in 1993):
    - BMM-1 (first aid and evacuation from the battle field),
    - BMM-2 (initial medical treatment at battalion-level) and
    - BMM-3 (mobile field hospital).
  - E-351BrM – mobile electric power station. The vehicle is equipped with an AD-30T/400 diesel-electric generator that can deliver power to up to 15 signals vehicles. It has a 2-men crew.
  - PU-12M6 (9S482M6) (punkt upravleniya) – battery command vehicle (BKP – batarejnyj kommandnyj punkt) for air defence units equipped with "Strela-1M" (SA-9), "Strela-10M2 (SA-13), "Osa-AK" (SA-8), 2S6 "Tunguska" and ZSU-23-4 "Shilka".
    - PU-12M7 (9S482M7) – improved version.
  - 1V152 – command and forward observer vehicle for field artillery units. The standard equipment consists of range finders, day/night vision devices, navigation equipment etc. The 1V152 and 1V153 (on Ural-4320 truck) belong to the KSAUO "Kapustnik-B" set.
  - R-149BMR – signals vehicle, equipped with R-168-100KA "Akveduk-100KA", R-168-100U, R-163-25U, R-163-10V, and R-163-1V "Arbalet" HF/VHF radio sets, AVSK intercom, P-338 video system, AD-3,5U-28,5 generator, ASh-4 telescopic mast, AZI NVIS HF antenna and ShDA-50 Discone-type antenna.
  - R-149MA1 – command and signals vehicle.
  - R-149MA3 – command and signals vehicle.
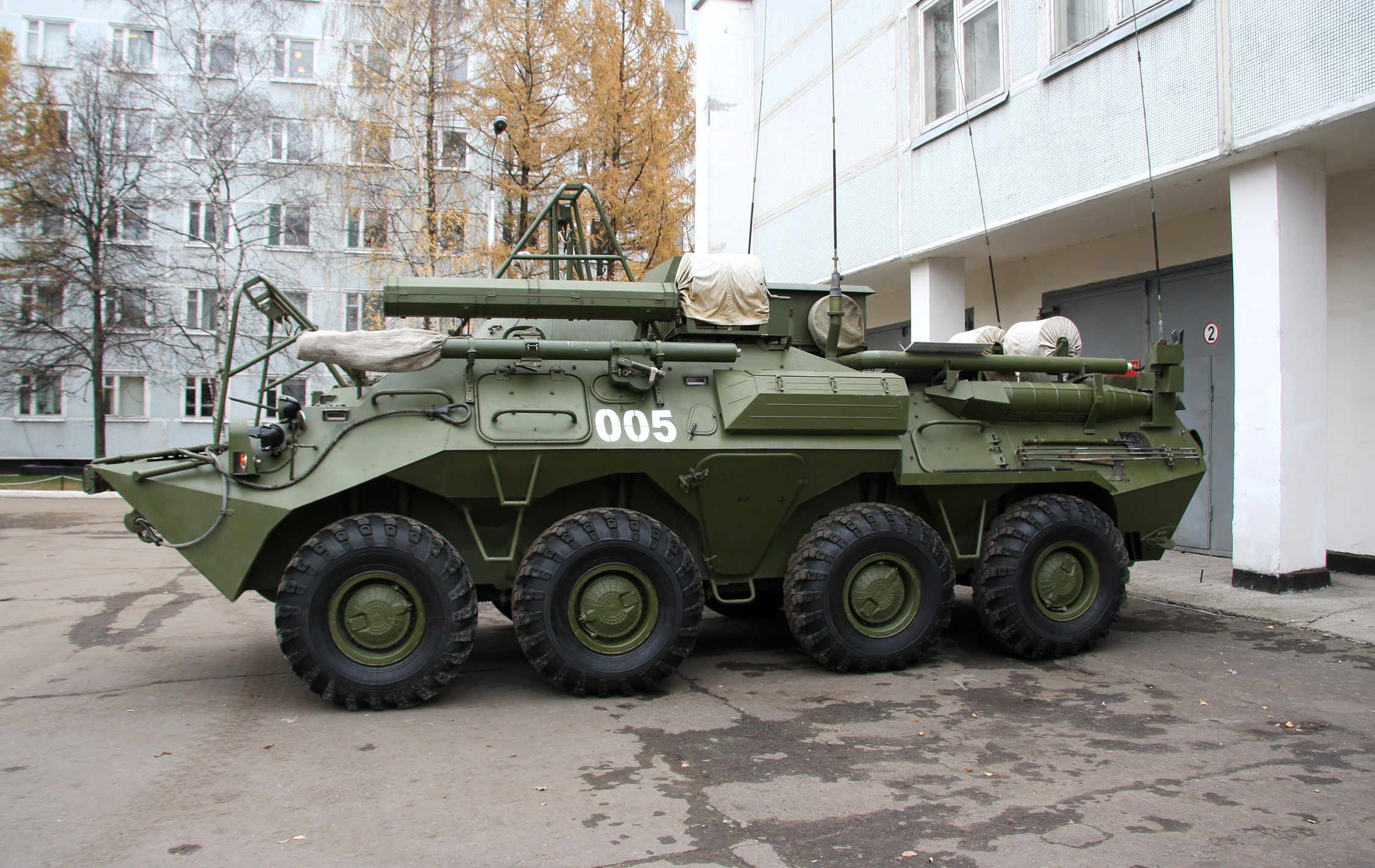
  - R-166 radiostation of the 27th Independent Sevastopol Guards Motor Rifle Brigade
    R-165B – HF signals vehicle equipped with "Arbalet-500K", R-163-10V and -50, R-163-AR radios, R-016V "Vishnya" HF link equipment and an AB-4U-P28.5-1V generator. The radio sets have a declared range of 20–350 km on the move and 40–1,000 km deployed.
  - R-439-MD2 – satellite communications vehicle.
  - R-439-BK "Legenda 2BK" – satellite communications vehicle, operates within 3400-3900 MHz (reception) and 5725-6225 MHz (transmission) ranges.
  - P-240BTZ – switchboard vehicle with "Zenit" set. Planned successor for the BTR-60 based P-240BT.
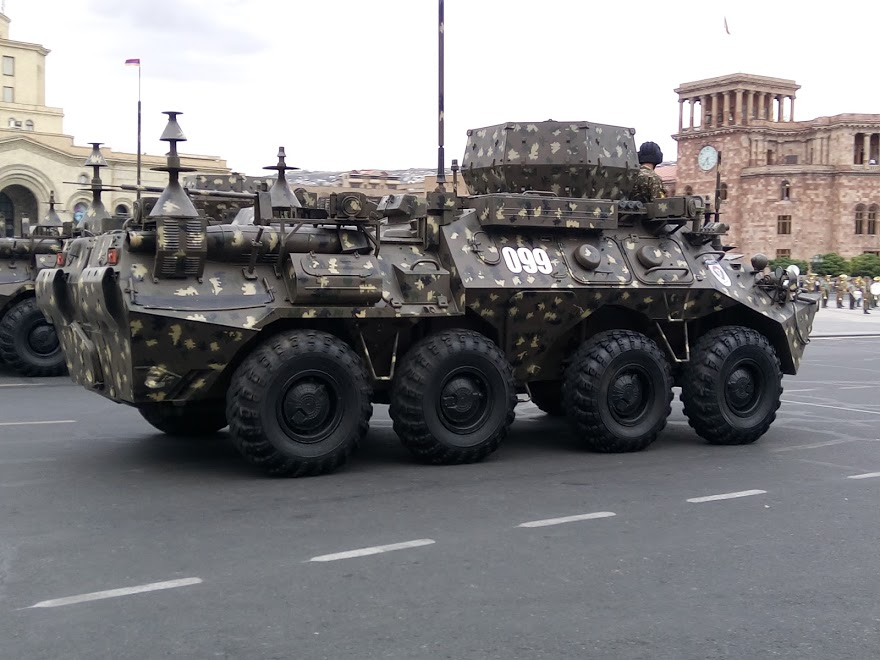
- Armenian «Infauna» during the military parade in Yerevan
  "Infauna" – An electronic countermeasures variant created for the Airborne Troops. The VDV accepted the first four vehicles into active service in early July 2012 after completing field evaluation which started in early 2012. As of September 2016, it has been delivered to Armenia.
- Mars-2000 – Reconnaissance combat vehicle based on the BTR-82.
- BTR-90

=== Colombia ===
- BTR-80 "Caribe" – version for Colombian marines with .50cal machine gun instead of 14.5 mm KPVT. 100 ordered. Caribe project is assembled in COTECMAR (Corporación Tecnológica del Mar Caribe) Plant in Cartagena de Indias, Colombia

=== Estonia ===
- BTR-80 UNSh (EST) – Estonian version of the BTR-80. In 1992, about 20 armoured vehicles were seized from a company trying to smuggle them out of Estonia as agricultural equipment. These vehicles were put into service in the Estonian Defence Forces. In 2013, 13 vehicles were handed over to the Estonian Defence League.

=== Hungary ===
- BTR-80M – Upgraded version with passive day/night sight KM-1M on top of the roof, stowage box for water bottles on the left hull side, improved NBC protection system and Kronsberg radio set.
- BTR-80 GKKO – Turret-less version with observation equipment. Prototype.
- BTR-80 MPAEJ (műszaki páncélozott akadály elháritó jármű) – Unarmed combat engineer version without turret. In service.
- BTR-80 MPFJ (műszaki páncélozott felderitő jármű) – Unarmed obstacle clearing vehicle without turret. In service.
- BTR-80 MVJ (mentő-vontató jármű) – Repair and recovery vehicle with crane and winch. In service.
- BTR-80 SKJ (sebesült kihordó jármű) – Heavily modified ambulance version with bigger troop compartment.
- BTR-80 VSF (vegyi-sugár felderítő jármű) – NBC reconnaissance vehicle. In service.

=== North Korea ===
- M2010 8×8 – Following the acquisition of 32 BTR-80As, North Korea appears to have produced and put into service a domestic clone of the vehicle of an unknown designation. It carries 3 crew and 7–8 troops and is fitted with an indigenous turret equipped with two 14.5 mm and one 7.62 mm machine guns. Other features such as protection, engine placement, entry and exit points, and amphibious capabilities are similar to the BTR-80. It is known unofficially as the M-2010 or Chunma-D, since it first appeared in a military parade in 2010.
- M2010 6×6

=== Peru ===
- Lince/Lynx - allegedly a Peruvian upgrade for BTR-80-type APCs by Desarrollos Industriales Casanave, which consist of a better suspension system, engine and gearbox. A 30mm autocannon with FCS controls is installed with two Defender missiles on the cannon.

Nevertheless, the recognized Ukrainian involvement in the armament (ZTM-2 cannon) and the strong visual resemblance to BTR-3 hints us to state that it is (at least a derivative of) a BTR-3.

=== Romania ===
- TAB Zimbru (B33) (transportorul amfibiu blindat) – A modified version of the BTR-80 with Model 1240 V8-DTS engine of 268 hp (197 kW), R-1231B radio set and 500 additional rounds 7.62 mm. Made by CN RomArm SA.

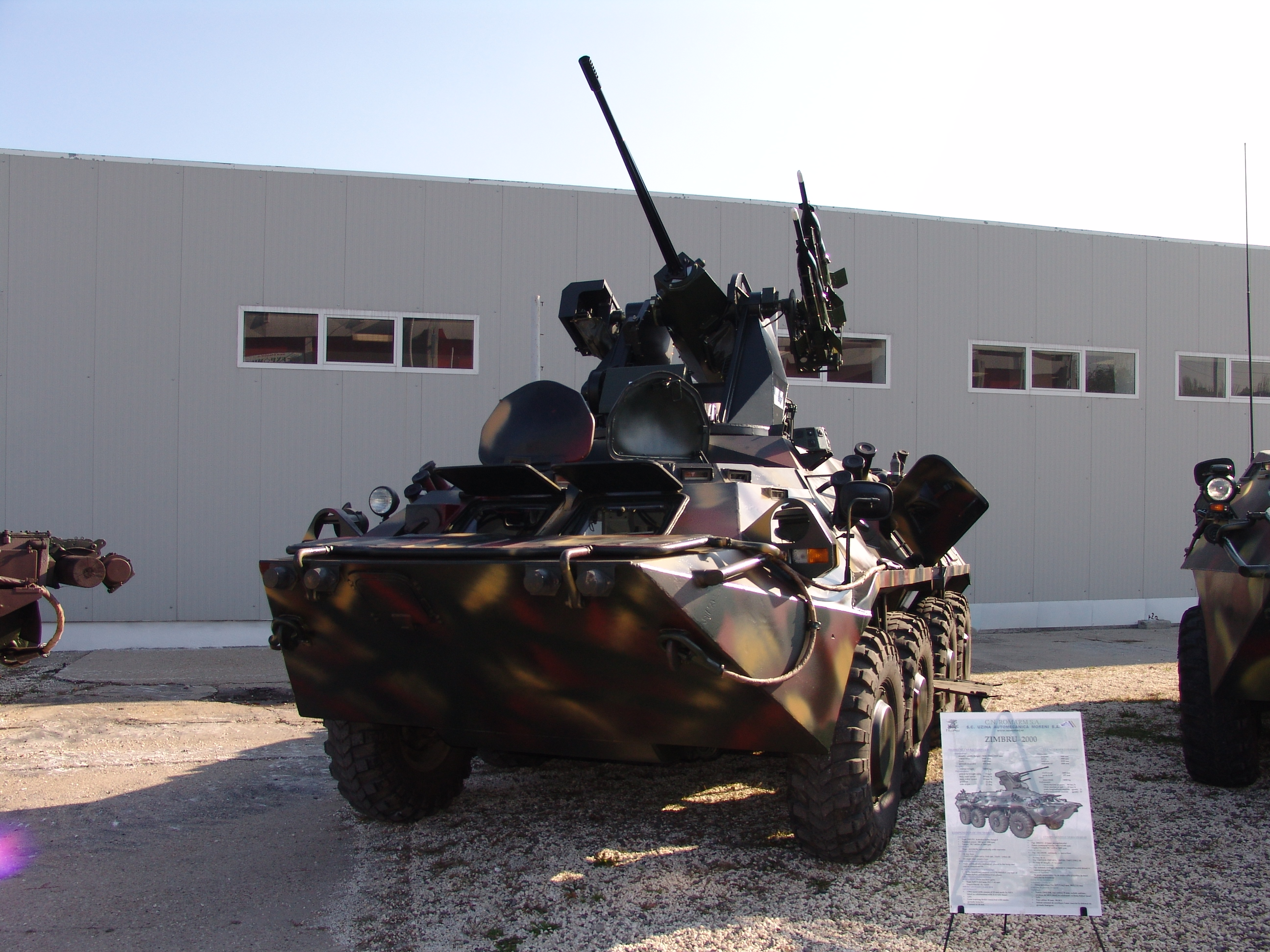
A Romanian Zimbru 2000 prototype

  - Zimbru 2000 – An improved version with bigger hull, new Deutz BF6M 1013FC 285 hp (212 kW) engine, new transmission Allison-MD 3060 PR etc. Can be fitted with a new turret like the OWS 25R. Prototype.

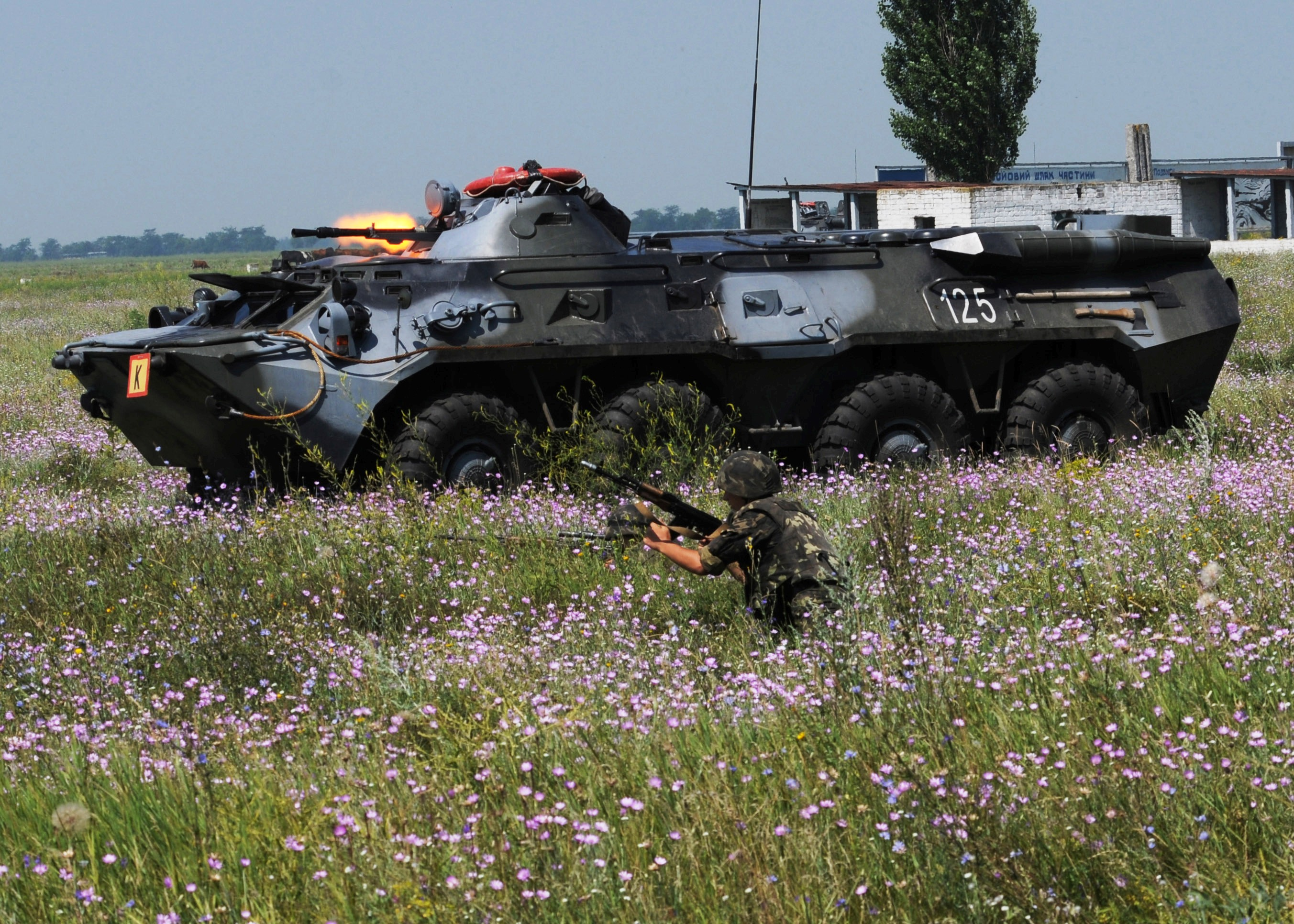
BTR-80 of the Ukrainian Naval Infantry, 2010.

=== Ukraine ===
- BTR-80UP – An improved version, produced in Ukraine in cooperation with Poland for Iraq (98 planned). Fitted with a new 300 hp engine, additional armour and air conditioner.
  - BTR-80UP-KB – battalion level command vehicle.
  - BTR-80UP-KR – company level command vehicle.
  - BTR-80UP-S – staff vehicle.
  - BTR-80UP-M – ambulance.
  - BTR-80UP-BREM – recovery vehicle.
  - BTR-80UP-R – reconnaissance version.
  - BTR-80UP-T – cargo version.
- BTR-94
- KShM "Kushetka-B" – command vehicle, based on the K1Sh1 chassis and developed by Radioprylad from Ukraine. The specialised equipment consists of the "Berkut-M" HF radioset and several, VHF sets – R-171M, R-173M "Abzats-M", R-163-50U, R-163-10V and R-163-1V "Arbalet" (with a range from 5 to 350 km). Other equipment includes a navigation apparatus (probably TNA-4-6), an AB-1-P28,5-B-V1 generator as well as DLYa4.115.002 and DLYa2.091.008 telescopic antenna masts.

== Operators ==
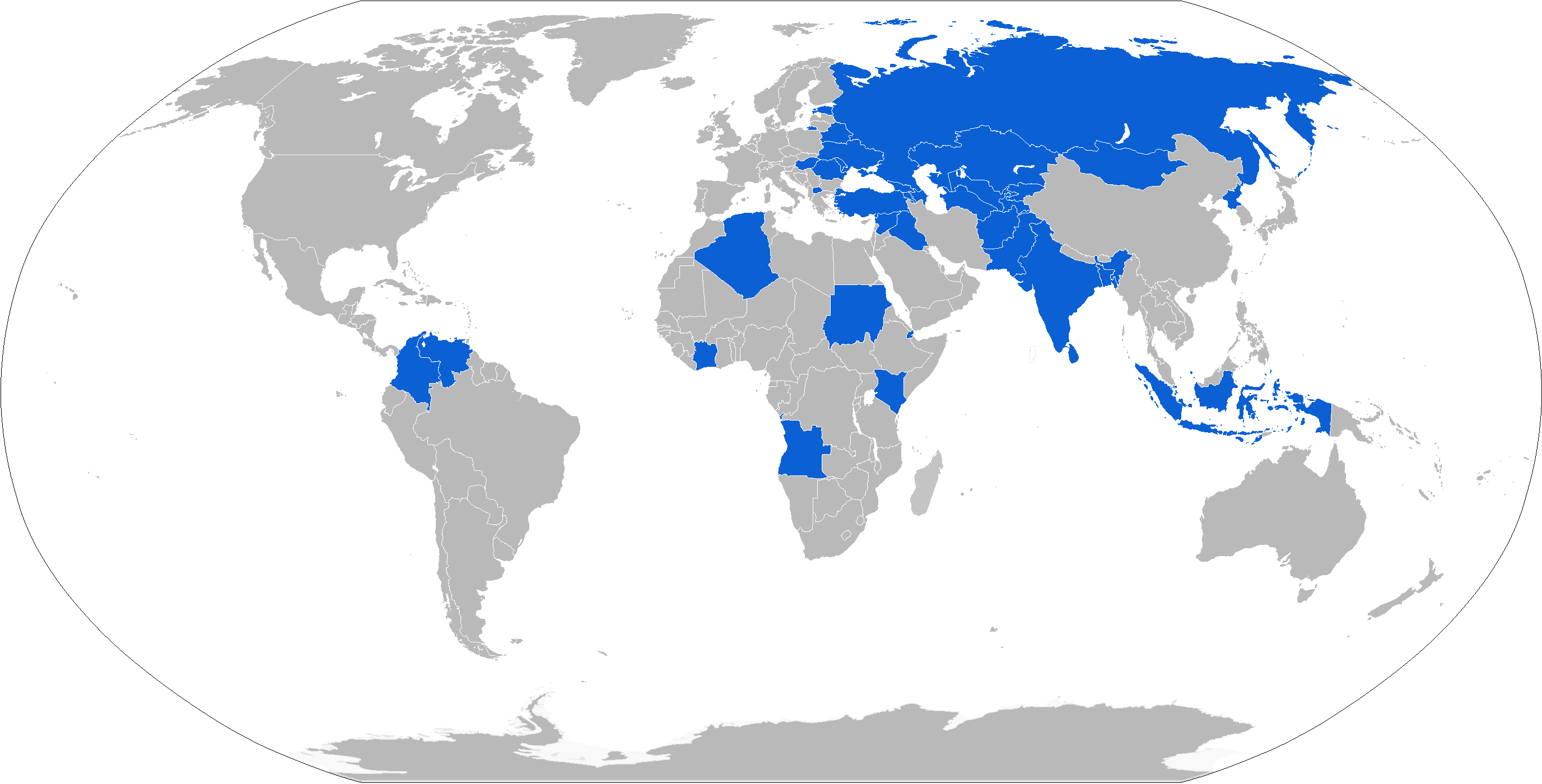
A map of BTR-80 operators in blue

=== Current operators ===
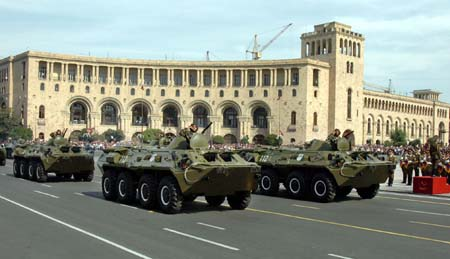
BTR-80s of the Armenian Army

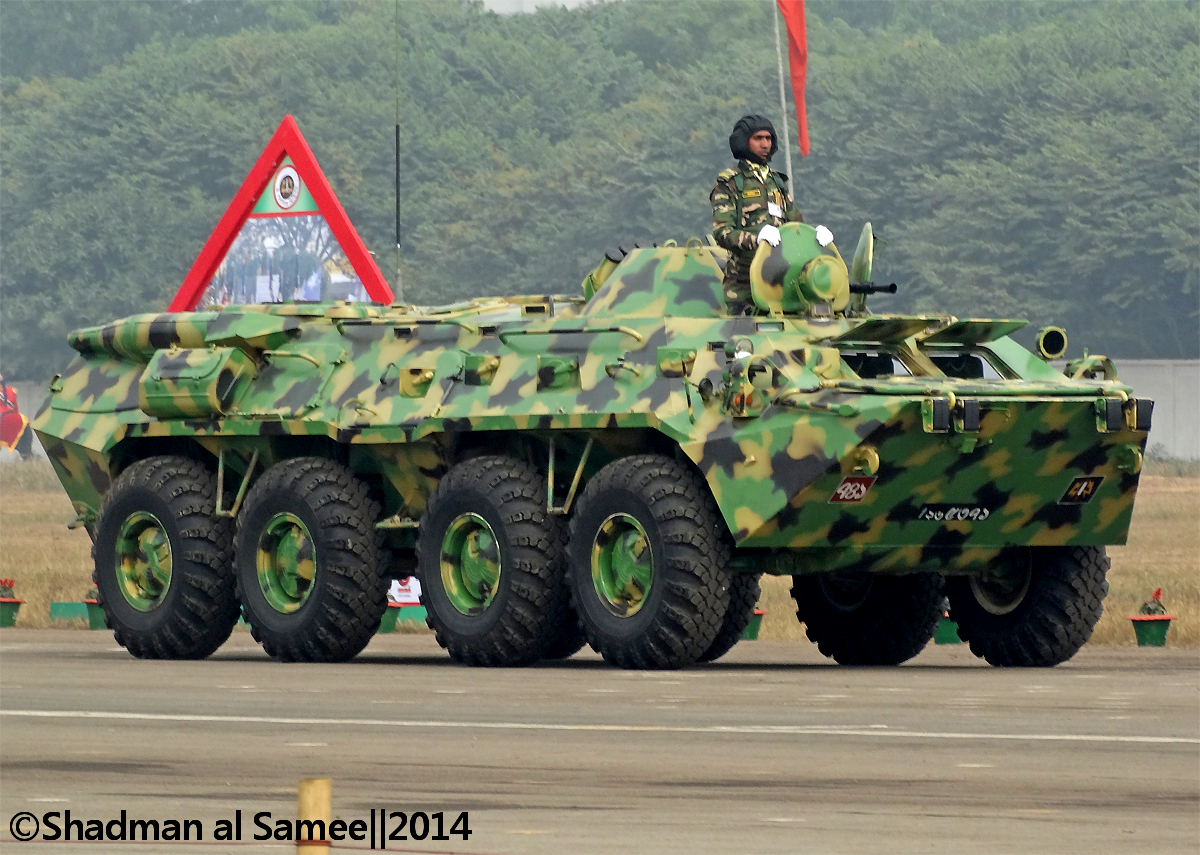
BTR-80 of the Bangladesh Army

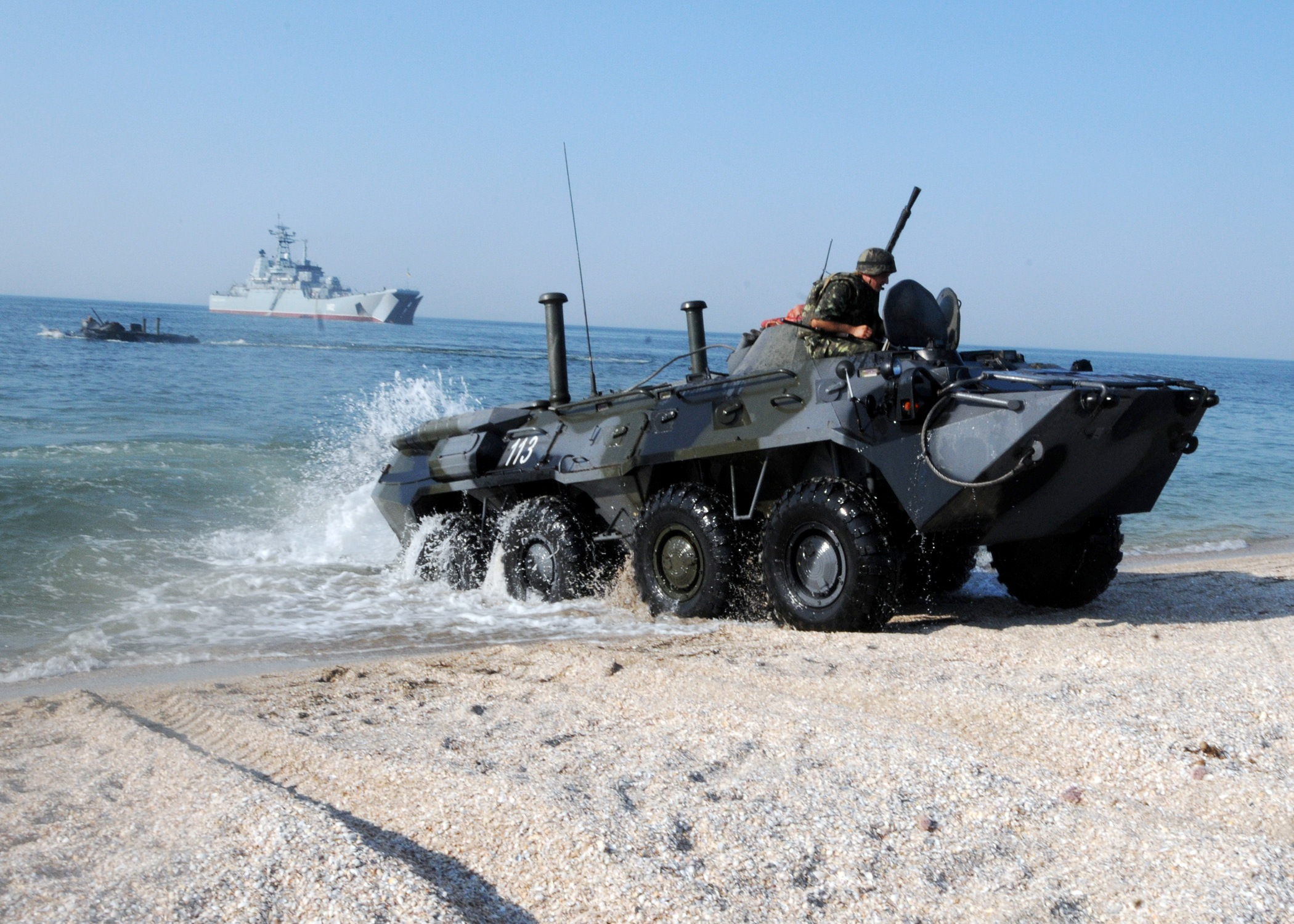
A BTR-80 of the 1st Ukrainian Marine Battalion takes part inExercise Sea Breeze 2010

- Afghanistan
- Algeria: 150
- Angola: 11
- Armenia: 4
- Azerbaijan: 70 BTR-80A and 230 BTR-82A
- Bangladesh: 330–645 (sources vary)
- Belarus
- Burundi: 10
- Chad: 24
- Colombia: 8
- Djibouti: 8
- Georgia: 43+
- Hungary: 260 BTR-80 in service as of 2024. 555 units were received from Russia between 1996 and 1999. Sixty-six vehicles were sold to Serbia in 2024. In June 2025, it was announced Serbia had purchased 108 vehicles.
- Indonesia: 12
- Iraq
- Ivory Coast: 6
- Kazakhstan: 155
- Kyrgyzstan
- Moldova
- Mongolia: 20
- Myanmar: unknown number in service
- Nicaragua
- North Korea: 32
- North Macedonia: 12 BTR-80 in service as of 2024.
- Pakistan : ~120 BTR 70s and 80s in service
- Russia: 1,200 BTR-80 and BTR-82
- Serbia: 108 BTR-80A, as of 2025.
- Sri Lanka: 49 BTR- 80A (20 to 30 BTR 80A now in service)
- Sudan: 90
- Syria
- Tajikistan
- Turkmenistan: 8
- Uganda: 32
- Ukraine: 350; reported 58 BTR-80 and 134 BTR-82A have been captured from Russian forces during the Russian invasion of Ukraine.
- Uzbekistan: 50
- Venezuela: 114
- Yemen: 100

=== Former operators ===
- Estonia: 13 used by Estonian Defence League. Phased out of active service.
- Ethiopia: 37 bought and used from Estonia in 1990. Not in use since 2015.
- Finland: 2 bought for testing in 1990. Withdrawn from use in 2010.
- India: Formerly used by the President's Bodyguard units.
- Romania: 70
- Turkey: 214 were bought from ex-USSR surplus. They were modernized with thermal sight. With the introduction of indigenous and modern vehicles, phased out of active service.
- Soviet Union: passed on to successor states.

=== Potential operators ===
- Argentina: Russia offered the construction of a factory for BTR 80/82 to Argentina.

== Museum exhibits ==
- Parola Tank Museum, Finland

== Sources ==
- Christopher F. Foss, editor. Jane's Armour and Artillery, Twenty-second Edition, 2001-2. Alexandria, Virginia (USA), and Coulsdon, Surry (UK): Jane's Information Group, Inc., 2001.
- Zaloga, Steven J. (1990). Soviet Wheeled Armored Vehicles. Hong Kong: Concord Publications. ISBN 962-361-013-0.
- Hull/Markov/Zaloga (1999). Soviet/Russian Armor and Artillery Design Practices: 1945 to Present. Darlington Productions. ISBN 1-892848-01-5
