= 1st Marine Battalion (Ukraine) =

Military unit

1st Separate Feodosia Battalion of Marines
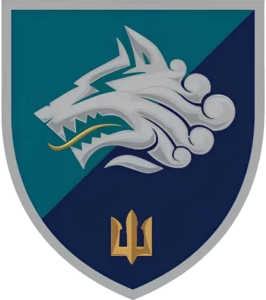
- Active: July 1, 1993–present
- Allegiance: Ukraine
- Branch: Ukrainian Marine Corps
- Type: Battalion
- Part of: 36th Marine Brigade
- Garrison/HQ: Mykolaiv
- Nickname: Salty Dogs
- Mottos: Loyalty and honor!
- Engagements: Russo-Ukrainian War; Annexation of Crimea; War in Donbas; Offensive on Mariupol (September 2014); Russian invasion of Ukraine; Siege of Mariupol; Battle of Bakhmut

Commanders
- Current commander: Unknown
- Notable commanders: Volodymyr Baraniuk

Insignia
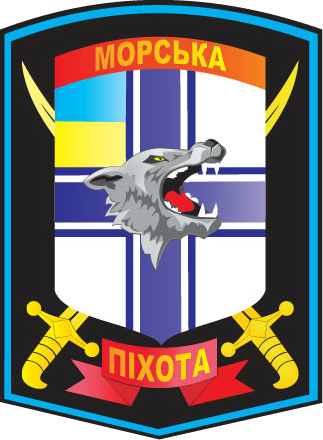
- Old unit patch

- Flag

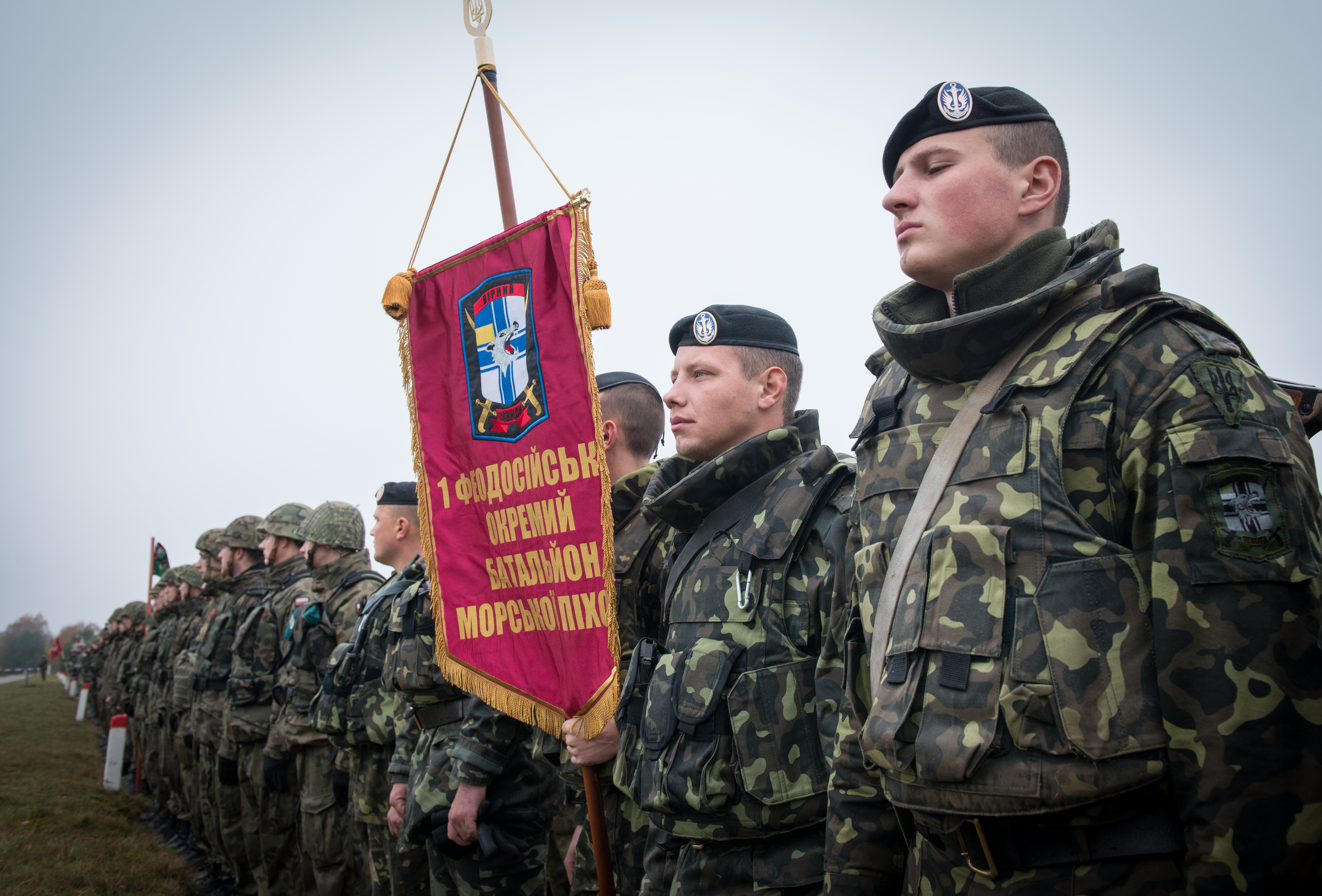
Marines at the opening ceremony of Exercise STEADFAST JAZZ, Poland (November 3, 2013)

The 1st Separate Feodosia Battalion of Marines (Ukrainian: 1-й окре́мий Феодосійський батальйо́н морсько́ї піхо́ти, romanized: 1-y okrémyy Feodosiys'kyi batal'yón mors'kóyi pikhóty; MUN A2777, until 2014: A2272) is a marine battalion of the Ukrainian Marine Corps part of the 36th Marine Brigade. It is located in the city of Mykolaiv, on the Alyaudy Peninsula.

The battalion, according to its purpose, is prepared for landing in advanced detachments to capture points and areas on the coast and ensure the landing of the main forces on them, equipped with appropriate weapons (it has BTR-80s in its composition, which can float).

== History ==
The formation of the first marine infantry battalion in Ukraine began with the directive of the Chief of the General Staff of the Armed Forces of Ukraine No. 115/1/**81 dated May 20, 1993. According to it, the formation of this unit began on the basis of the headquarters of the Navy of the Armed Forces of Ukraine. In order for the first battalion of the Ukrainian marines to become a combat-ready unit as soon as possible, the personnel for conscript service for it were selected from among the officers and ensigns of the 810th separate brigade of marine infantry of the Black Sea Fleet, as well as the Northern, Baltic and Pacific Fleets of the former USSR, and soldiers and sergeants from the air - landing troops. Psychological testing of volunteers was carried out, physical and moral qualities of candidates for marines were checked. The main task of the battalion was to counter the marines of the Russian Federation in the Crimea during the distribution of the fleet. The fighters were noted for their high combat training and patriotism. On July 1, 1993, the 27th separate battalion of marines was formed: military unit A2272, the location of the village. Tylove, Sevastopol (based on the former construction battalion). At the beginning of the formation, the leaders of the district and city councils of Ternopil, Lviv, Kyiv and other cities of Ukraine provided significant financial assistance to the marines.

According to the directive of the Chief of Staff of the Naval Forces of the Armed Forces of Ukraine No. 14/1/**62 dated August 17, 1994, the 27th separate marine infantry battalion was resubordinated to the commander of the 4th separate marine brigade of the Navy of the Armed Forces of Ukraine.

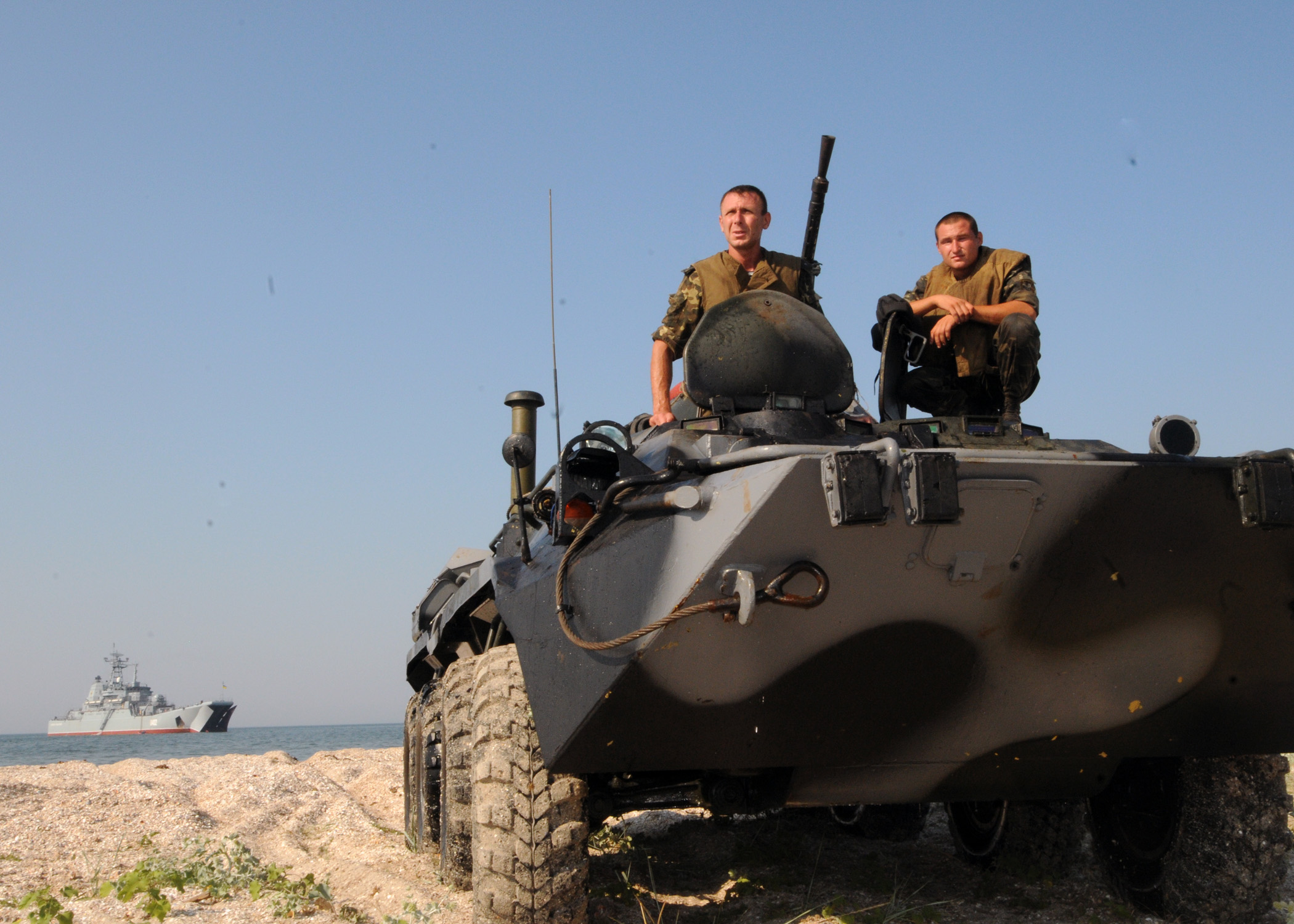
Ukrainian BTR-80 on the coast of Tendra Island. In the background is the "Kostyantin Olshanskyi" VDK, July 15, 2010.

According to the directive of the commander of the Naval Forces of the Armed Forces of Ukraine No. 14/1/**45 dated June 18, 1996, from this very day, the 27th separate battalion of marines was resubordinated to the commander of the 6th separate coastal missile artillery brigade of the Navy Armed Forces of Ukraine.

On September 9, 1997, the 27th separate battalion of marines was relocated to the base of the 42nd military townlet in the city of Sevastopol.

From December 1, 1997, the 27th separate battalion of marines was again subordinated, this time to the commander of the 1st separate marine brigade of the Navy of the Armed Forces of Ukraine, and was renamed the 1st separate battalion of marines (former 4th separate brigade of marines, which was transferred to the National Guard of Ukraine)

On August 10, 2001, the 1st separate battalion of marines was relocated to the village of Krasnokamyanka (Military townlet of Feodosia-13), which is subordinate to the Feodosia City Council of the Autonomous Republic of Crimea. The conventional name of the A2272 military unit has been preserved.

On December 5, 2003, after the disbandment of the 1st separate marine infantry brigade, the 1st separate battalion was resubordinated to the commander of the 36th Separate Coastal Defense Brigade of the Navy of the Armed Forces of Ukraine.

On April 29, 2004, the 1st separate battalion of marines was redeployed from Krasnokamyanka to Feodosia.

In 2007, the battalion created a company in honor of the Hutsul marines (meaning the 1st and 2nd Hutsul regiments that were part of the UNR marine brigade): about 70 people were recruited from Prykarpattia.

On October 30, 2007, 1O BMP was resubordinated to the Chief of the Coastal Defense Forces Center of the Navy of the Armed Forces of Ukraine.

From October 1 to October 30, 2008, the battalion participated in the anti-terrorist operation of the NATO national forces "Active Efforts".

On November 18, 2008, the 1st separate marine infantry battalion was given the conditional name of the 1st Separate Feodosian Marine Infantry Battalion.

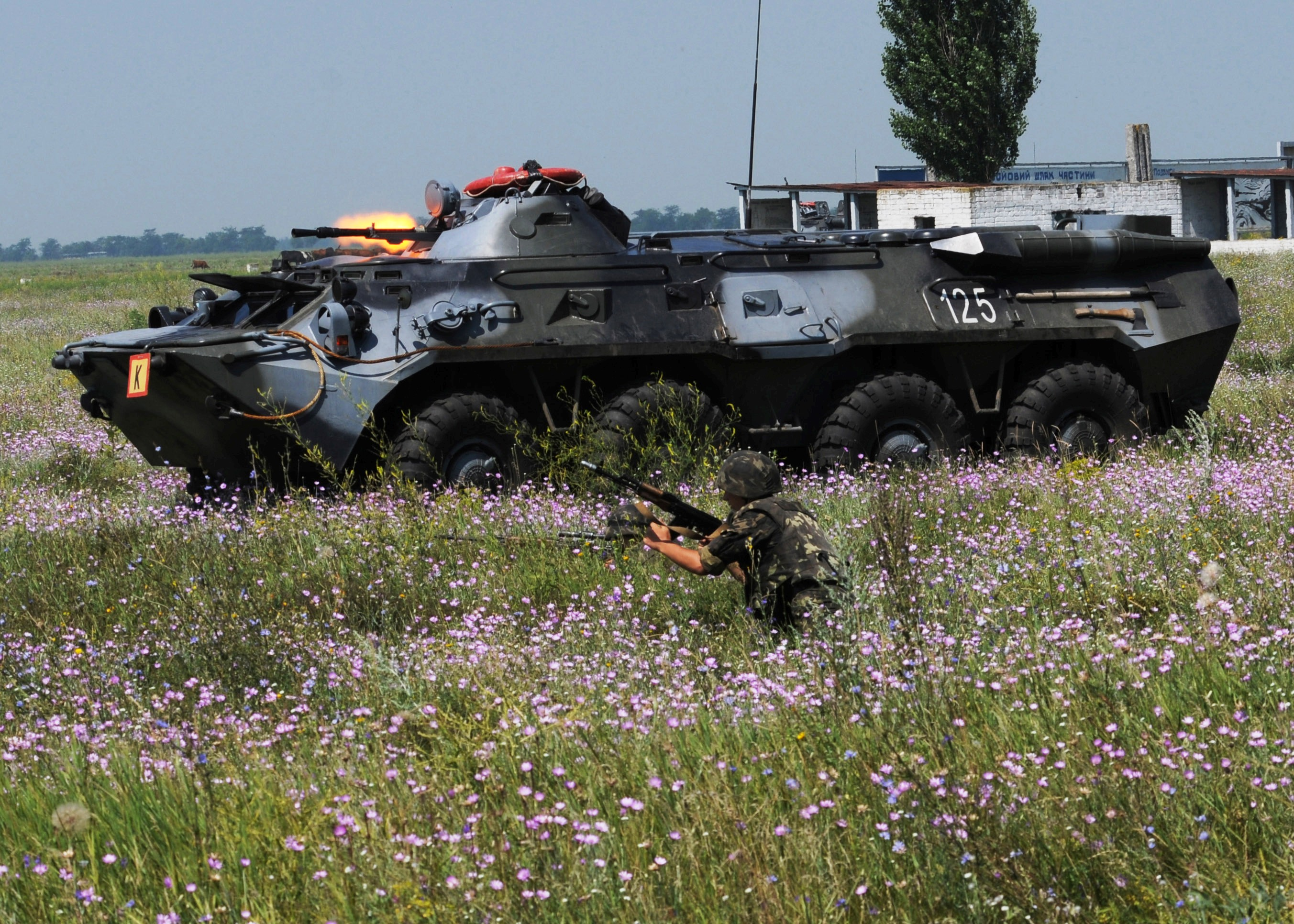
Soldiers of the 1st Separate Feodosia Marine Battalion at the Exercise Sea Breeze 2010

From April 4 to November 15, 2009, the 1st separate Feodosia battalion of marines participated in the 12th rotation as part of the joint Ukrainian-Polish peacekeeping battalion "UkrPolbat" of the multinational tactical group "East" of the KFOR forces in Kosovo. For 7 months, soldiers in black berets carried out the task of maintaining peace and tranquility in the territory of the municipality of Štrpce in the Balkans.

Since 2013, the battalion began to be staffed exclusively by military servicemen under contracts.

At the end of 2013, the fighters of the 1st Air Force took part in the second phase of the main certification command and staff training of the NATO Response Force "Steadfast Jazz".

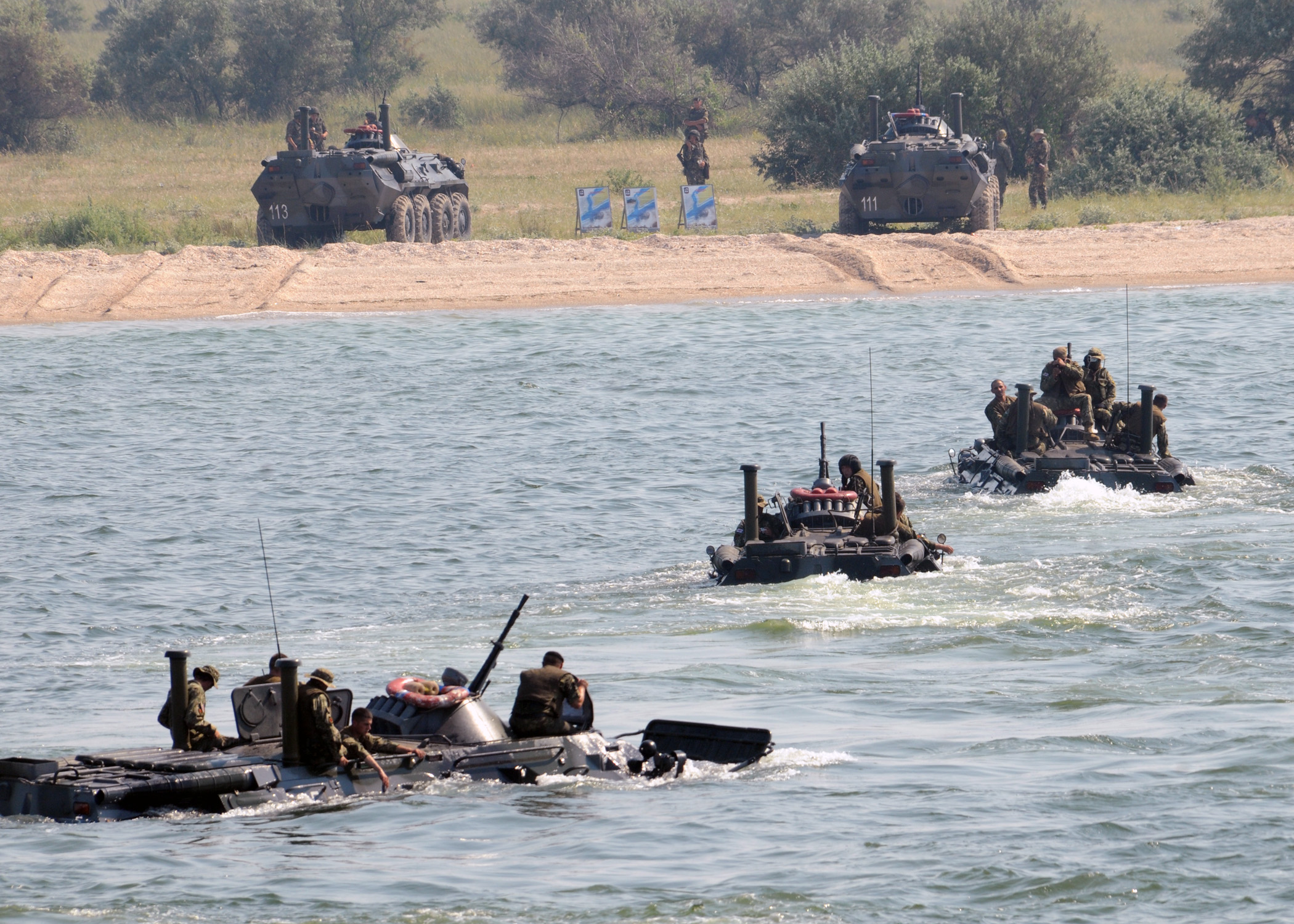
Feodosia marines land on Tendra Spit, Shirokiy Lan training ground, 2010

On January 8, 2014, two companies of the 1st Offbmp began combat duty as part of the European Union tactical combat group "HelBRoC" and as part of NATO's immediate reaction forces.

=== Russo-Ukrainian War ===
On the night of February 27, 2014, the annexation of Crimea by Russia began. In a few days, the place of permanent deployment of the battalion was blocked by Russian units. Despite the ultimatum to lay down arms, the Ukrainian marines strengthened the unit's perimeter and prepared for an assault.

On March 19, 2014, servicemen of the 1st Feodosia separate marine infantry battalion appealed to the command of the Armed Forces of Ukraine and the Ukrainian authorities regarding specific directives for actions in the current situation.

On the morning of March 24, Russian troops, supported by two Mil Mi-24 helicopters, stormed part of the Feodosian marines. Ukrainian marines engaged in hand-to-hand combat, but were captured. Battalion commander Dmytro Delyatskyi and deputy personnel commander Rostislav Lomtev were taken by helicopter to an unknown destination by the Russian military. On the same day, the Deputy Chief of the Main Command Center of the Armed Forces of Ukraine, Major General Oleksandr Rozmaznin, announced that a marine brigade of Ukraine would be created on the basis of the Feodosia 1st Marine Battalion.

In the evening of March 26, Dmytro Delyatsky and Rostyslava Lomtev, together with other Ukrainian officers, were released from Russian captivity.

After these events, only 137 servicemen of the battalion out of about 600 decided to continue their service in the Armed Forces of Ukraine. Later, from the remnants of the 1st and 501st marine infantry battalions and replenishment from contractors in the Navy of Ukraine, the 1st marine infantry brigade named after Kostyantyn Olshanskyi was established.

On October 29, 2014, senior sailor Artem Kornev, who had been serving in the 1-FOBMP since 2009, and after the annexation of Crimea, was killed in Talakivka township in the town of Talakivka as part of a combined unit of the Navy of the Armed Forces of Ukraine, which carried out combat missions during the Russo-Ukrainian War. He did not betray his oath and continued his service in Mykolaiv, and lieutenant colonel (posthumously) Yurii Zagrebelnyi.

In 2015, through the reformation of the 36th Separate Coastal Defense Brigade, the 36th Marine Brigade was formed and the 1st Separate Battalion became part of it.

During its existence, the battalion participated in the following exercises: Exercise Sea Breeze (2001, 2002, 2007, 2008, 2010, 2013), "Fairway of Peace" (2003), "Cooperative Partner" (2003), " Northern Lights" (2003), "Peace Shield" (2005), "Diamond Mariner" (2006), "Adequate Response" (2011, 2012), "Interaction" (2011, 2012). Also in 2009, tactical exercises were conducted with the battalion tactical group.

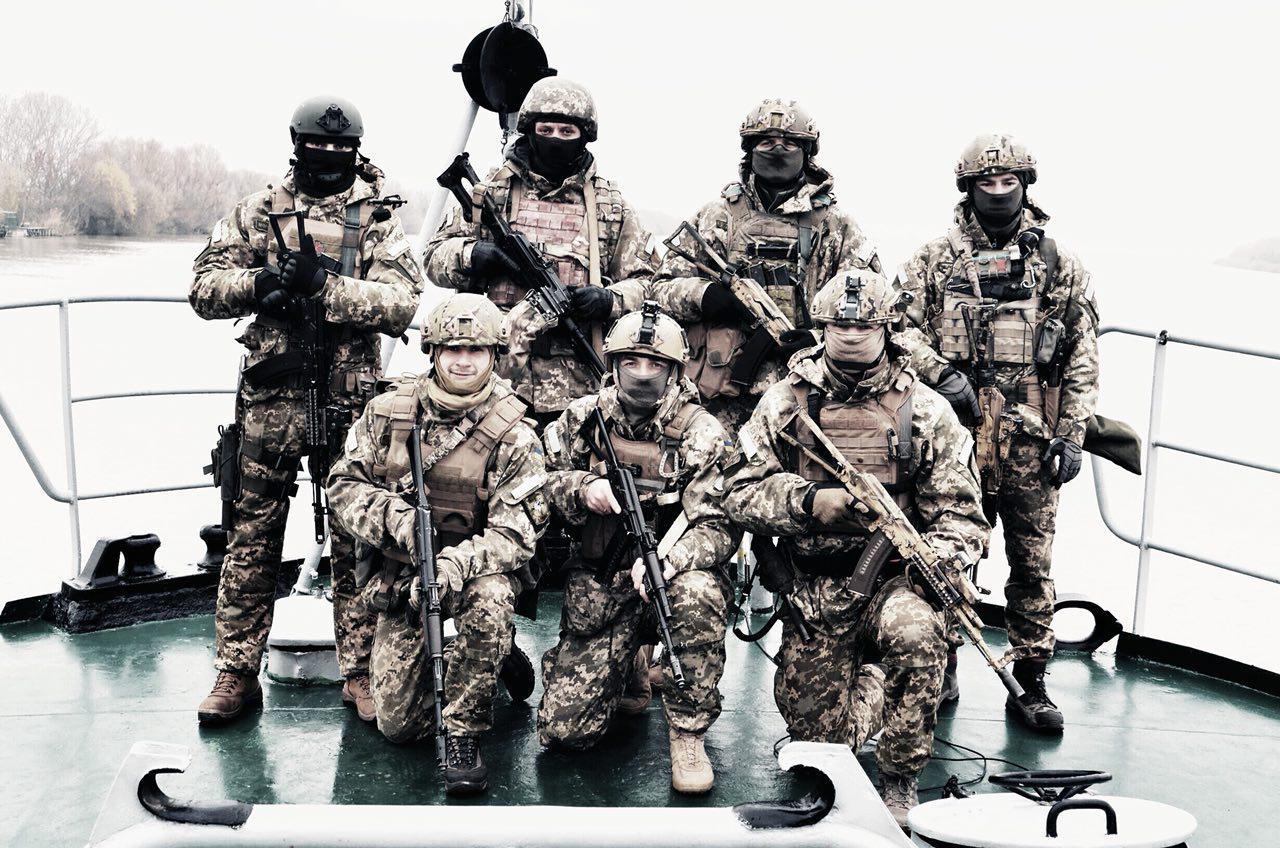
Combined landing group from 1-OBMP. Photo: E. K2R Silkin.

On May 23, 2018, during the solemn ceremony celebrating the Day of the Marine Corps of Ukraine, during the ceremony of replacing the black beret with a beret of the color of the sea wave, part of the soldiers of the battalion staged a demarche in front of the Supreme Commander of the Armed Forces of Ukraine and refused to comply with the order to change the berets.

==== Russian Invasion ====
The battalion took part in the Siege of Mariupol and took heavy casualties however a few soldiers of the battalion were able to sneak out of the besieged city. The battalion also fought in Mykolaiv, Avdiyivka and in October 2022 in Bakhmut, then at Donetsk airport, liberated Levadne in Zaporizhzhia and Urozhaine in Donetsk region.

== Structure ==
=== 2008 ===
- management, headquarters
- 1st Marine Corps Company
- 2nd company of marines (reinforced by a grenade launcher platoon from AGS-17)
- airborne-assault company (parachute-airborne)
- mortar battery
- reconnaissance platoon

=== 2012 ===
- management, headquarters
- 1st Marine Corps company
- 2nd Marine Corps company
- Airborne-Assault Company (parachute-airborne)
- Mortar Battery company
- Material and Technical support company
- Reconnaissance platoon
- Sniper platoon
- Anti-tank platoon
- Communications platoon
- Engineer and sapper platoon
- Amphibious vehicle platoon
- Medical Center

== Commanders ==
- Lieutenant Colonel O.S. Holoborodov 06/08/1993 - 10/13/1994;
- Major Yuri Ivanovych Ilyin 13.10.1994-17.01.1995;
- Lieutenant Colonel A.O. Sadovskyi 17.01.1995 - 29.01.1997;
- Major O. V. Karyak 16.08.1996 - 19.08.1998;
- Major Yuriy V. Shestov 28.08. 1998 - March 28, 2002;
- Major Rubin Kostyantyn Romanovych 27.02.2002 - 18.08. 2003;
- Major Veremchuk V. P. 19.08.2003 - 28.12.2004;
- Lieutenant Colonel Fedorenko Yu. A. 28.12.2004 - 10.07. 2006;
- Major S. M. Steshenko 06/30/2006 - 02/27/2009;
- Lieutenant Colonel Andrey A. M. 27.02. 2009 - November 3, 2010;
- Major Oleksandr Yakovych Konotopenko (November 29, 2010 - November 20, 2012);
- Lieutenant Colonel Dmytro Evgenovich Delyatskyi (16.08.2012-2014);
- Lieutenant Colonel Volodymyr Anatoliyovych Baraniuk (2014—2016);
- Major Ihor Mykhailovych Popadiuk (2016—2017);
- Lieutenant Colonel Bondarenko Vadim Oleksandrovych (2017—2018).
- Major Bova Yevhenii Petrovych (2018).

== Equipment ==
As of December 2012:

- BTR-80 – 60 (were on the territory of the military unit of the battalion during the assault on the unit by the Russian military)
- 2S12 "Sleigh" – 8
- AGS-17 – 8
- 9K38 Igla – 8

== Traditions ==
The battalion is nicknamed the "Salty Dogs", acquired during military training in the United States.

== Losses ==
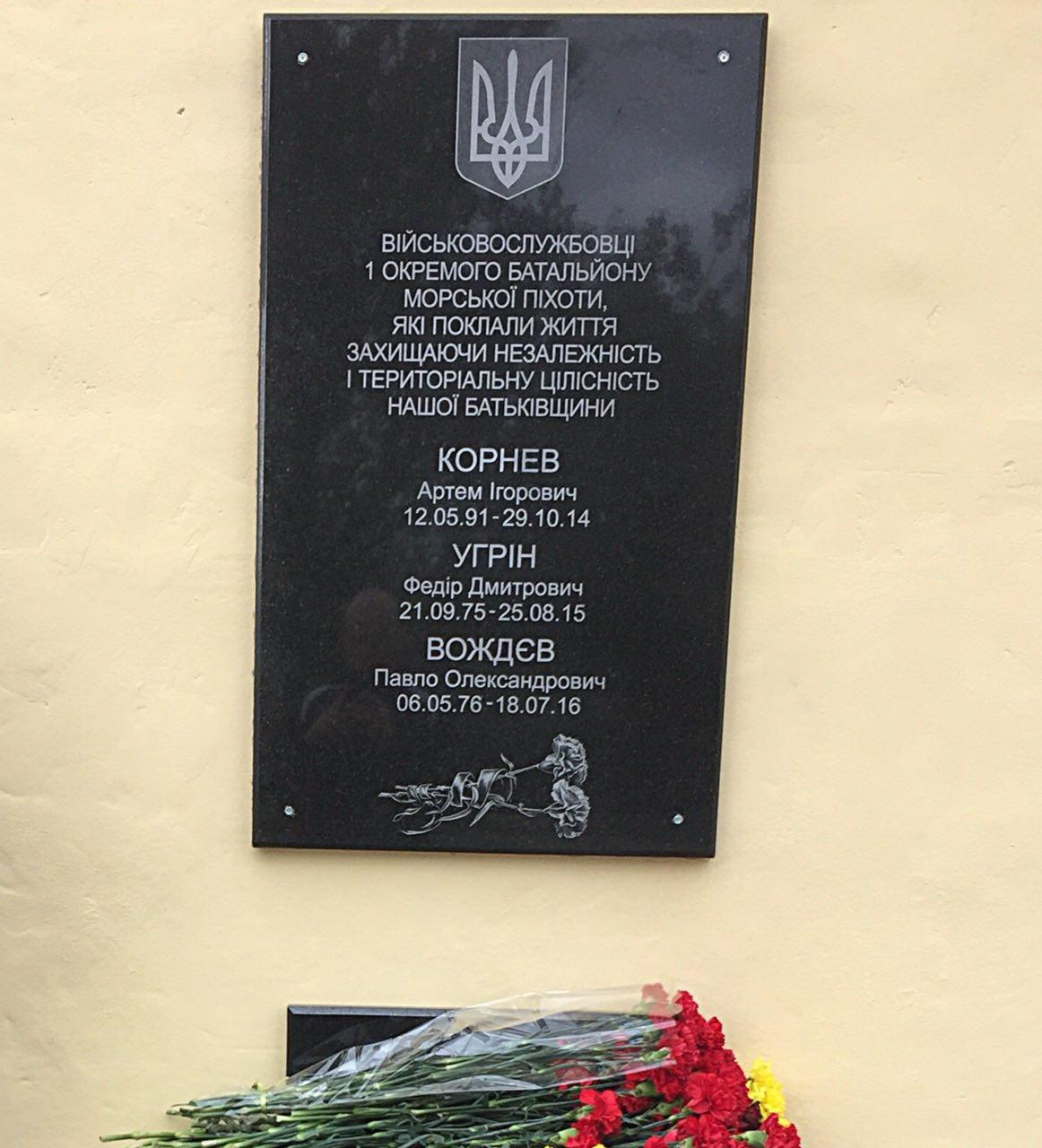
The memorial to the dead from the 1st OBMP, located on the territory of the unit's training grounds

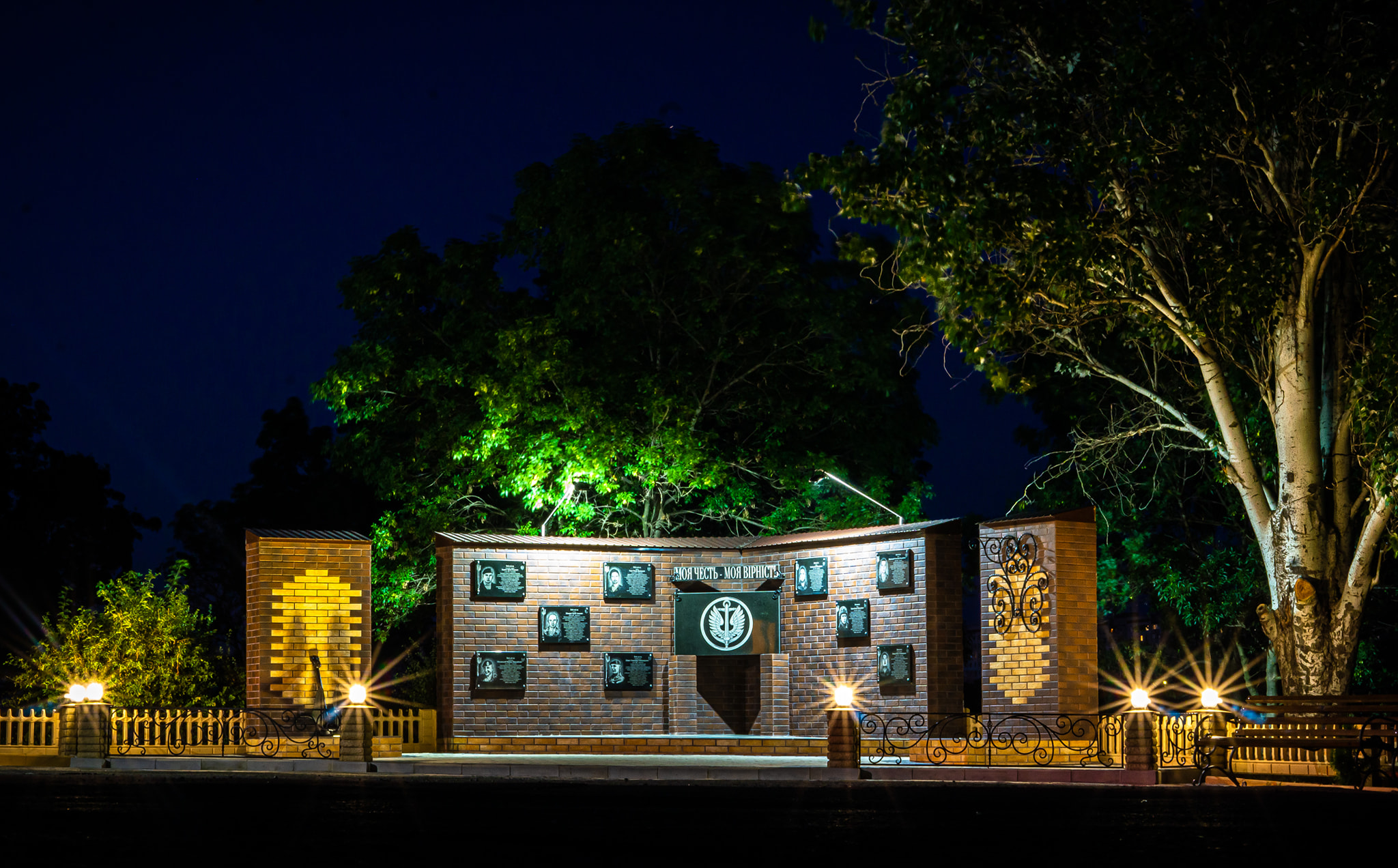
Memorial to fallen marines in Alyaud

- Junior Sergeant Kornev Ihorovych Artem, 29.10.2014, Talakivka.
- senior sailor Ugrin Dmytrovych Fedir, 25.08.2015, Lebedynske (Volnovakh district).
- Senior Sergeant Pavlo Oleksandrovych Vozhdev, 07/18/2016, Vodyane.
- Senior Ensign Arkush Ivanovych Serhiy, 14.09.2017
- Senior Sailor Oleksandr Oleksandrovich Sharko, 08/06/2019, Pavlopil.
- Sailor Vasyl Mykolayovych Kurdov, August 6, 2019, Pavlopil.
- Sailor Rak Mykolayovych Vladyslav, 08/06/2019, Pavlopil.
- Soldier Shandra Ivanovych Serhiy, 08/06/2019, Pavlopil.
- sailor Oleksandr Valeriyovych Linchevskyi, September 11, 2019, Pavlopil
- Ensign Mykola Mykolayovych Obukhovskyi, 11.09.2019, Pavlopil
- Sailor Artem Yevhenovych Koziy, 21.07.2020, Pavlopil (died of wounds in a mobile hospital in Mariupol)
- Junior Sergeant Serhii Oleksandrovych Moiseyenko, 28.02.2021, p. Pyshchevyk, Volnova district, Donetsk Oblast

== Links ==
- Світлини 1-го окремого батальйону морської піхоти
- ІСТОРИЧНА ДОВІДКА ВІЙСЬКОВОЇ ЧАСТИНИ А 2272 -(27) 1 ОБМП
- ЗРАДЖЕНІ, АЛЕ НЕ ЗНИЩЕНІ
- 1 ФОБМП виконував завдання:
- назавжди. Десантно-штурмова рота Першого Окремого батальйону морської піхоти» // tyzhden.ua, 18 грудня 2015
- 1-ий окремий Феодосійський батальйон морської піхоти на Українському мілітарному порталі
- «Залізнична» сотня: морпіхи вирушили до Косово. Поїздами ФОТО
- 36 окрема бригада морської піхоти
- Константин Колонтаев. Краткая история морской пехоты Военно — морских сил Украины (рос.)
- МОРСЬКІ ПІХОТИНЦІ on YouTube
- «Вірний завжди» — бойове гасло морської піхоти on YouTube
- Морской десант в море. "Си Бриз 2012" on YouTube
- "Військова частина А2272 / Дезертири та зрадники". vms-ukraine.info/. ВМС ЗС України. Archived from the original on 2018-05-25.
- "Чорний берет". petrimazepa.com. Петро і Мазепа. 2018-05-25. Archived from the original on 25 May 2018.
