= 36th Separate Coastal Defense Brigade =

Military unit

- 36-а окрема бригада берегової оборони
- Sleeve patch of the Brigade
- Active: December 1, 2003 – April 20, 2015
- Country: Ukraine
- Branch: Ukrainian Navy
- Type: Infantry
- Role: Coastal Defense
- Size: 1,200 (2014)
- Garrison/HQ: Perevalne, Autonomous Republic of Crimea
- Motto(s): там де ми, там перемога (Where we are, there is victory)
- Engagements: Russo-Ukrainian War: Annexation of Crimea by the Russian Federation; War in Donbas (2014–2022)

Commanders
- Notable commanders: Denys Berezovsky; S. I. Storozhenko

The 36th Separate Coastal Defense Brigade (MUN A2320) was a military unit that was part of the Armed Forces of Ukraine that existed from 2004 to 2014. The Coastal Defense brigade was subordinate to the Ukrainian Navy replacing the 32nd Army Corps in defending Crimea.

== History ==
In 2003 the 32nd Army Corps, which was tasked with the defense of Crimea and fielded 12,000 troops, was disbanded. Following the disbandment 6,400 servicemen where re-deployed to other parts of the country, and the remaining 5,600 troops where transferred to the Ukrainian navy and reorganized into new units in 2004. The defense of Crimea was tasked to the 36th Separate Coastal Defense Brigade in Perevalne, the 1st Marine Corps in Feodosia and the 501st Separate Naval Infantry Battalion in Kerch. The 5,600 Ukrainian personnel stationed on the peninsula attempted to resist the 30,000 Russian troops during the Annexation of Crimea by the Russian Federation.

=== Crimea ===
Early in the morning of February 27, 2014, the Brigade awoke to find their barracks surrounded by unmarked Russian speaking special forces. According to the brigade's colonel, S. I. Storozhenko, on March 21, 2014, personnel were given three options. Either remain loyal to their oaths and surrender their weapons and equipment and be allowed to return to unoccupied Ukraine, disband and return home, or renounce their oaths to Ukraine and swear a new oath to the Russian Federation. Out of 1200 servicemen, 199 left for unoccupied Ukraine, 300 quit, the rest swore allegiance to the Russian Federation. 58.42% of the unit betrayed their country, higher than the 29.6% of all Ukrainian personal in Crimea. The defecting personnel where temporally transferred to the Black Sea Fleet before the Brigade was reorganized as the new 126th Coastal Defence Brigade, a recreation of an old Soviet Brigade Ukraine inherited in 1991 and disbanded in 1996. The 126th Coastal Defence Brigade uses the 36th Separate Coastal Defense Brigade's old barracks in Perevalne as their headquarters.

=== Legacy ===
Elements loyal to Ukraine from the 1st Marine Battalion, 36th Separate Coastal Defense Brigade, and 501st Separate Naval Infantry Battalion would be merged to form the 36th Marine Brigade. Former soldiers of the 36th Separate Coastal Defense Brigade would continue to be listed as members of the Brigade during the War in Donbas until at least 2020.
