= Prisoners of war in the Russo-Ukrainian war (2022–present) =

War crimes in Ukraine

During the Russo-Ukrainian war (2022–present), both Ukrainian and Russian/separatist prisoners of war have suffered several forms of abuse, such as mistreatment, exposure to public curiosity, torture, and even execution.

As of November 2022, the UN Human Rights Monitoring Mission in Ukraine (HRMMU) conducted 159 interviews with prisoners of war held by the Russian and Russian-affiliated forces, and 175 interviews with prisoners of war held by Ukraine. The mission later expressed concern about mistreatment of prisoners of war in the conflict, as it reported that prisoners of war held by both sides had been subject to several forms of abuse.

== Ukrainian prisoners of war ==
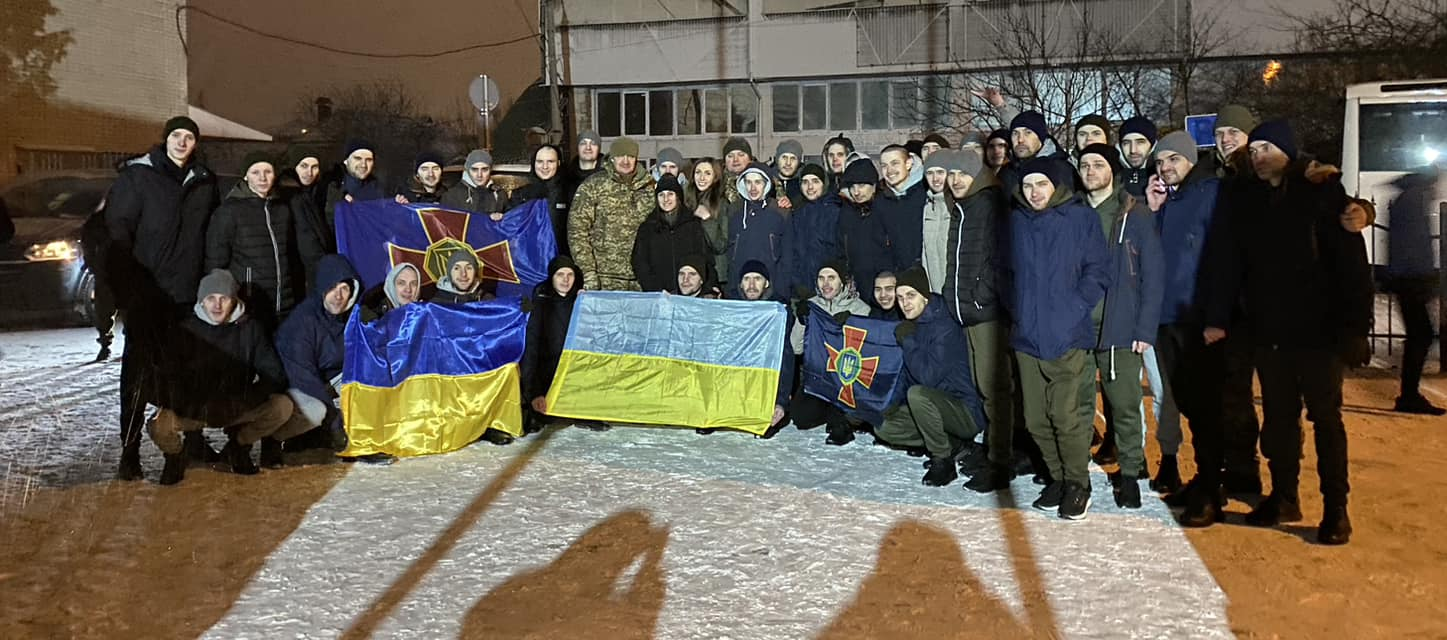
Ukrainian soldiers released during the exchange between Ukraine and Russia on 3 January 2024

=== Mistreatment of Ukrainian POWs ===
The HRMMU reported that Ukrainian soldiers had their personal belongings stolen during admission into POW camps, and that the prisoners were taken to the camps into overcrowded buses, with little to no access to water and toilets; many were blindfolded with their wrists bound with duct tape in a way that left many with wounds in these areas. The same was reported inside the camps themselves, with many POWs reporting overcrowded cells, as well as a lack of food, hygiene and contact with their families.

An August 2022 report by the Humanitarian Research Lab of the Yale School of Public Health identified 21 filtration camps for Ukrainian "civilians, POWs [prisoners of war], and other personnel" in the vicinity of Donetsk oblast. Imaging of one camp, the Olenivka prison, found two sites of disturbed earth consistent with "potential graves". Kaveh Khoshnood, a professor at the Yale School of Public Health, said: "Incommunicado detention of civilians is more than a violation of international humanitarian law—it represents a threat to the public health of those currently in the custody of Russia and its proxies." Conditions described by freed prisoners include exposure, insufficient access to sanitation, food and water, cramped conditions, electrical shocks and assault.

Journalistic investigations shared by The Guardian in April 2025 suggest that SIZO-2 in Taganrog is one of many torture prisons organised by Russia to hold Ukrainian POWs and civilians without formal charges, communication to people outside of the facility, or access to legal representation.

==== Humiliation of captured Ukrainian soldiers ====
Videos showing Ukrainian prisoners of war being forced to sing pro-Russian songs or carrying bruises have attracted concerns about their treatment. Dmytro Lubinets, head of the Ukrainian parliament's human rights committee, claimed that Russians forcibly shaved heads of female Ukrainian prisoners.

Captured Ukrainian soldiers with British citizenship were recorded calling for Boris Johnson to arrange for them to be freed in exchange for pro-Kremlin Ukrainian politician Viktor Medvedchuck. The videos were broadcast separately on Rossiya 24 TV channel, causing MP Robert Jenrick to call the videos a "flagrant breach" of the Third Geneva Convention. A Russian spokeswoman claimed that the Ukrainian prisoners of war with British nationality were being treated humanely, referenced a call by Boris Johnson for British prisoners to be shown mercy and said that in turn the UK should "show mercy" to the Ukrainian citizens by stopping military aid to the Ukrainian government.

Another video circulated showing an interview by pro-Kremlin UK journalist Graham Phillips (former reporter of RT and Zvezda) of Ukrainian war prisoner of British nationality Aiden Aslin. Aslin had served in the Ukrainian army for four years and was captured by the Russian army in Mariupol. In the video he appears in handcuffs with a cut on his forehead, is repeatedly called a "mercenary" rather than an official combatant, and told that his crime is punishable by death. The video was aired on Russian television. The United Nations Human Rights Monitoring Mission in Ukraine later expressed worries about the treatment of Ukrainian prisoners of war held by Russian and separatist forces.

==== Torture of Ukrainian POWs ====
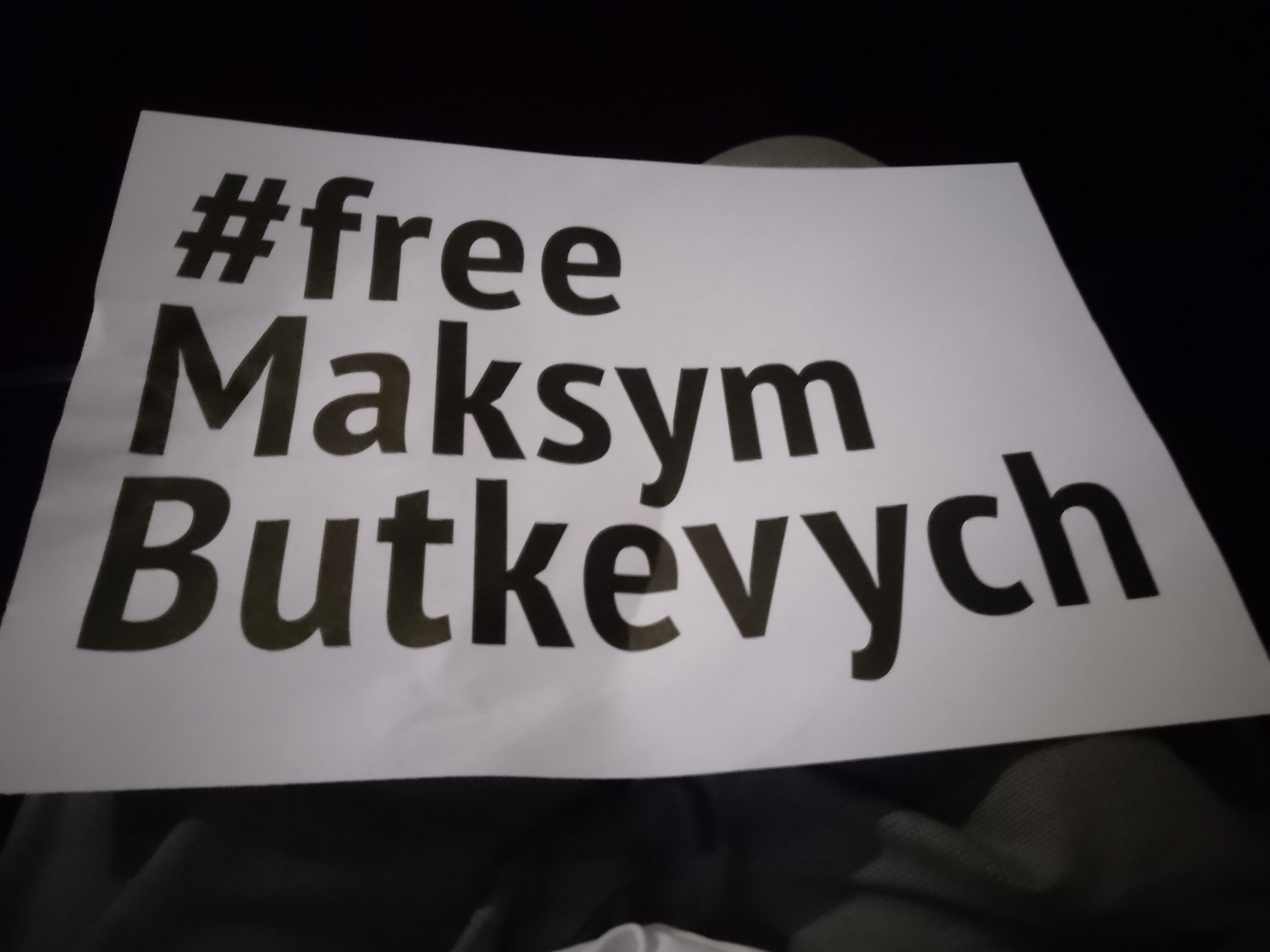
Ukrainian prisoner of war and human rights activist Maksym Butkevych was sentenced to 13 years in prison

The vast majority of Ukrainian prisoners who had in the hands of the Russian Federation and Russian-affiliated armed groups reported that they had been interned in dire conditions and subjected to torture and ill-treatment, including beatings, threats, dog attacks, mock executions, as well as electric and positional torture. Several women and male prisoners were threatened with sexual violence and subjected to degrading treatments and enforced nudity. A male prisoner reportedly had been pulled with ropes tied around genitalia; The UN agency also collected information about nine possible cases of death during the "admission procedures" to the internment camps.

On 22 July, Human Rights Watch documented the torture of three Ukrainian prisoners of war, members of the Territorial Defense Forces, and the death of two of them in the occupied areas of Kherson and Zaporizhzhia Oblasts.

As of 31 July 2022, OHCHR verified that, out of 35 interviewed, 27 Ukrainian prisoners of war had been subjected to torture by Russian and pro-Russian armed forces and policemen. Victims reported being punched, kicked, stabbed, beaten with police batons and wooden hammers, electrocuted with tasers, hung from the arms or legs, threatened with execution or sexual violence, or shot in the legs. One Ukrainian POW reported that he had been tortured with wires attached with his genitalia and nose, he described how the guards would torture POWs not only for obtaining information, but also "just for intimidation and humiliation", some women prisoners reported that they had not been victims of physical torture, but that they would be "tormented by the screams of other prisoners of war being tortured in nearby cells".

Also on 31 July, the OHCHR reported that it had received information about the deaths of two Ukrainian prisoners as a result of torture, one beaten and electrocuted on 9 May at the Melitopol airfield, the other beaten to death at the Volnovakha penal colony near Olenivka, Donetsk region, on 17 April. Eight other deaths were also under investigation.

In March 2023, UN human rights commissioner Volker Türk reported that more than 90% of the Ukrainian POWs interviewed by his office said they had been tortured or ill-treated in penitentiary facilities, which Russia despite several requests did not give UN staff access to. The United Nations Special Rapporteur on torture said in September 2023 that Russia's use of torture "is not random, aberrant behavior," but "orchestrated as part of state policy to intimidate, instill fear or punish to extract information and confessions".

In March 2024, a report by UN Human Rights Office indicated that 39 of the 60 Ukrainian POWs released during that month said that they had been subject to sexual violence during their internment. In October of that same year, a report by the OHCHR also confirmed the systematic use of different methods of torture against Ukrainian prisoners by Russian soldiers.

In June 2025 media published a photo of a Ukrainian soldier returned as part of prisoner exchange with "Glory to Russia" text burned into the skin on his abdomen while at a Russian hospital. The text was carved using professional surgical instruments, while he was in anesthesia.

In February 2026, journalists at Radio Free Europe/Radio Liberty published an investigation which included private correspondence of the Russian general Roman Demurchiev, which included him boasting to close contacts and other members of the military about executing, torturing, and desecrating bodies of Ukrainian soldiers, including POWs. According to Meduza, the archive also revealed the complicity of Demurchiev's superiors.

==== Execution of surrendering and captured Ukrainian soldiers ====
At an Arria-formula meeting of the UN Security Council, the US ambassador-at-large for global criminal justice Beth Van Schaack said that US authorities have evidence that surrendering Ukrainian soldiers were executed by the Russian army in the Donbas region. A Ukrainian soldier who was shown among prisoners in a Russian video on 20 April, was confirmed dead days later.

Eyewitness accounts and a video filmed by a security camera provide evidence that on 4 March 2022 Russian paratroopers executed at least eight Ukrainian prisoners of war in Bucha.

In March 2024, the UN issued a report saying Russia may have executed more than 30 recently captured Ukrainian POWs over the winter. The UN Human Rights Office verified three incidents in which Russian servicemen executed seven Ukrainian servicemen. In October 2024, following Russian marines from the 155th Naval Infantry Brigade executing nine Ukrainian prisoners, Ukrainian authorities said that Russian forces had executed more than 100 surrendering Ukrainians during the invasion, most of them in 2024. Forbes described the incident as ″the latest in an escalating campaign of terror by Russian troops″. That same month, the EEAS described increasing frequency of Russian executions of Ukrainian prisoners, with at least 177 prisoners dying in Russian captivity since the beginning of the war.

In late January 2025, a video circulated around various social media outlets allegedly showing Russian military personnel executing Ukrainian POWs in an unidentifiable location in Donetsk Oblast. Six Ukrainian soldiers were captured by Russian personnel and were then reportedly disarmed and executed by Russian forces. The Russian personnel recorded the event, and their taunting of the POWs. Each executed soldier was forced to watch, and each where shot in the back. At the start of the video, a seventh Ukrainian soldier is lying motionless on the ground, their fate unknown. The Ministry of Foreign Affairs of Ukraine decried the shooting as an atrocity and forwarded relevant information to international organizations, such as the United Nations and Red Cross, due to the violation of the Geneva Convention. The Prosecutor General of Ukraine also launched an inquiry into the shooting.

On 6 November 2025, a Russian soldier accused of executing a surrendering Ukrainian soldier at point blank range was sentenced to life in prison by a Zaporizhzhia court. The following month, On 5 December, Russian troops reportedly shot and killed a Ukrainian soldier as he was surrendering, leading to a pre-trial war crime investigation by the Donetsk Regional Prosecutor's Office being launched.

As of December 2025, since 24 February 2022, the UN had verified the executions of 96 Ukrainian prisoners, while it found another 119 allegations of executions ″credible″. In the same time frame, the Prosecutor General of Ukraine office had pursued 103 criminal proceedings relating to the killings of 333 Ukrainian soldiers who had surrendered or laid down arms. According to Oleksandra Matviichuk, head of the Center for Civil Liberties and 2022 Nobel Peace Prize laureate, executing prisoners of war is one of Russia's tactics in its objective to ″break″ the Ukrainian population. A total of 41 member states of the Organization for Security and Co-operation in Europe launched an investigation by experts on the ground in July 2025, and in its report in September 2025, it noted significant difficulties due to Russia's lack of cooperation and transparency, but concluded that several elements indicate that the executions are a regular occurrence.

===== Castration and murder of a Ukrainian POW in Pryvillia =====
On 28 July, a video was posted on Russian social media which shows a Russian soldier castrating a Ukrainian prisoner of war, who is tied up and gagged, with a box cutter. On the next day, a continuation video was posted with possibly the same soldiers where they taped the POW's mouth with black tape, placed his head in front of his cut genitals, and shot him in the head.

On 5 August, the Bellingcat group reported that the videos were geolocated to the Pryvillia Sanatorium, located in Pryvillia, Luhansk Oblast, and interviewed the apparent perpetrator by telephone. A white car marked with a Z – a designation marking Russian military vehicles and a militarist symbol used in Russian propaganda – can also be seen in the video; the same car can also be seen in earlier, official videos released by Russian channels, of the Akhmat fighters at the Azot plant during the Russian capture of Severodonetsk. Pryvillia had been captured and occupied by Russians since early July. Bellingcat identified the soldiers involved, including the main perpetrator (an inhabitant of Tuva), as members of the Akhmat unit. The investigation also indicated that the video contained no evidence of tampering or editing.

===== Olenivka prison massacre =====
On 29 July 2022, a Russian-operated prison in Molodizhne near Olenivka, Donetsk Oblast, was destroyed, killing 53 Ukrainian prisoners of war and leaving 75 wounded. The prisoners were mainly soldiers from the Azovstal complex, the last Ukrainian stronghold in the siege of Mariupol.

Both Ukrainian and Russian authorities accused each other of the attack on the prison. The General Staff of the Ukrainian Armed Forces said that the Russians blew up the barrack in order to cover up the torture and murder of Ukrainian POWs that had been taking place there, and Ukrainian authorities provided what they said were satellite images of pre-dug graves and intercepted communications indicating Russian culpability, while Russians suggest that a HIMARS rocket was shot from Ukrainian territory.

On 3 August, the UN secretary-general Antonio Guterres announced his decision to establish a fact-finding mission, as requested both by Russia and Ukraine.

===== Execution of Oleksandr Matsievskyi =====
In early March a graphic 12-second video showing an unarmed soldier with a Ukrainian uniform, who is standing in a shallow trench, he says "Slava Ukraini" ("Glory to Ukraine"), while calmly smoking a cigarette, the Russian officer in charge of the prisoner (off camera) then shouts "Die Bitch!" and fires multiple rounds from a machine gun into him, several other shots are heard, and the prisoner collapses. Before the murder, he was allegedly forced to dig his own grave, in the video he is in a hole, and there is a shovel behind him. Several Ukrainian officials condemned the execution, with the President of Ukraine's office calling the execution a "brutal murder".

===== Beheading and mutilation of Ukrainian soldiers =====
In April 2023, two videos surfaced which appeared to show beheaded and mutilated Ukrainian soldiers. One video purportedly filmed by Wagner Group mercenaries and posted on April 8, shows the bodies of two Ukrainian soldiers next to a destroyed military vehicle, their heads and hands missing, with a voice commenting in Russian in the background.

The second video, posted on April 11, shows a man lying on the ground, dressed in a military uniform with a yellow band on the sleeve, a man with a white bandage on the leg approaches, then decapitates the prisoner, who screams in pain, he is apparently given instructions on the radio, nearby there are people shouting in Russian: "We work, brothers! Cut if off, asshole! Break his spine! What, you've never cut off some heads? Until the end, asshole." According to CNN, this video was probably shot in the summer of 2022, mainly because of the amount of green plants and grass present in the video.

Russian social media accounts claimed that the videos were shot near Bakhmut. Both videos led to strong condemnation by western and Ukrainian officials and media, with some drawing comparisons between this case and beheadings by the Islamic State.

In May 2026, Ukraine's General Staff said that a Russian commander ordered the beheading of the bodies of two Ukrainian soldiers killed near Huliaipole and for them to be put on display.

==== Illegal trials of Ukrainian prisoners ====
Russia has prosecuted multiple Ukrainian prisoners for being members of the Azov Brigade, which it considers a terrorist organisation. Human Rights Watch noted that as the defendants' alleged actions were not illegal in the time and place they were committed, such prosecutions violated the Third Geneva Convention on the Treatment of Prisoners of War, as they appeared to be retaliation against the prisoners for their participation in the defence of Ukraine.

===== Death sentence against foreign citizens serving in the Ukrainian armed forces =====
Following a trial by the Supreme Court of the Donetsk People's Republic, three foreign-born members of the Ukrainian armed forces, Aiden Aslin, Shaun Pinner, and Brahim Saadoun were declared mercenaries and sentenced to execution by firing squad. Aslin and Pinner, originally from England, had been serving in the Ukrainian military since 2018, while Saadoun had come in 2019 from Morocco to study in Kyiv, having enlisted in November 2021. The ruling was described as illegal because the defendants qualify as prisoners of war under the Geneva Conventions and have not been accused of committing any war crimes.

On 10 June the Office of the United Nations High Commissioner for Human Rights condemned the death sentences and the trial. A spokesperson of the organisation declared that "such trials against prisoners of war amount to a war crime," and highlighted that according to the chief command of Ukraine, all the defendants were part of the Ukrainian armed forces and therefore should not have been considered mercenaries. The OHCHR spokesperson also expressed concern about procedural fairness, stating that "since 2015, we have observed that the so-called judiciary within these self-contained republics has not complied with essential fair trial guarantees, such as public hearings, independence, impartiality of the courts and the right not to be compelled to testify."

The International Bar Association issued a statement saying "that any implementation of the ‘pronounced’ death penalty will be an obvious case of plain murder of Aiden Aslin, Shaun Pinner and Brahim Saaudun and deemed an international war crime. Any perpetrators (anyone engaged in the so-called DPR ‘court’ and anyone who conspired to execute this decision) will be regarded as war criminals", also pointing out that neither Russian nor Ukrainian law allows the death penalty.

On 12 June, Donetsk People's Republic leader Denis Pushilin reiterated that the separatists did not see the trio as prisoners of war, but rather as people who came to Ukraine to kill civilians for money, adding that he saw no reason to modify or mitigate the sentences. Russian State Duma Chairman Vyacheslav Volodin accused the trio of fascism, reiterating that they deserved the death penalty. He added that the Ukrainian armed forces were committing crimes against humanity and were being controlled by a neo-Nazi regime in Kyiv.

On 17 June, the European Court of Human Rights issued an emergency stay of Saadoun Brahim's execution. It stressed that Russia was still obliged to follow the court's rulings. Earlier in June, the Russian State Duma passed a law to end the jurisdiction of the court in Russia, but it had not yet been signed into law.

On 8 July the DPR lifted a moratorium on the death penalty. On 21 September five British citizens held by pro-Russian separatists were released, including those sentenced to death, the Moroccan citizen Saadoun Brahim was also freed after a prisoner exchange between Ukraine and Russia.

==== Coercion of Ukrainian POWs to fight for Russia ====
In October 2023, Russian state media reported on the creation of the "Bohdan Khmelnytsky Battalion", a so-called "volunteer battalion" of Russia whose members are Ukrainian POWs who were "recruited" from Russian penal colonies. The Institute for the Study of War has assessed that it is likely that Russia has coerced the Ukrainians to join the formation, which violates the Geneva Convention on Prisoners of War, which dictates "no prisoner of war may at any time be sent to or detained in areas where he may be exposed to the fire of the combat zone", and shall not "be employed on labor which is of an unhealthy or dangerous nature". Russian state media has claimed that the battalion has "recruited" roughly 70 Ukrainian POWs in February alone. However some sources state that up to 200 Ukrainian POWs have joined the battalion It was reported that members of the battalion have begun training and will begin fighting in "an unspecified area of the front line" when they are done.

== Russian prisoners of war ==
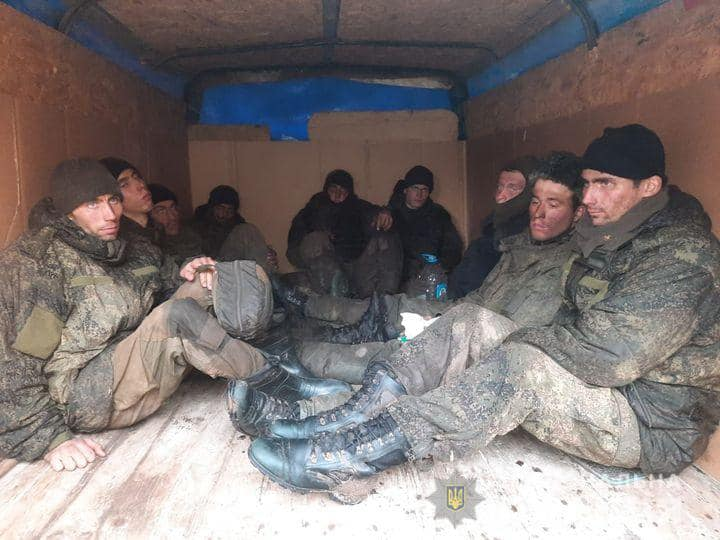
Captured Russian soldiers during the Battle of Sumy.

=== Options for surrendering ===
On 18 September 2022, the Ukrainian Coordination Headquarters for the Treatment of Prisoners of War (Ukrainian: Координаційний штаб з питань поводження з військовополоненими), as a continuation of the project designed to inform the Russian military about the possibility of laying down weapons and preserving their lives, launched a special state project called "I Want to Live", with a 24-hour hotline for receiving appeals from the Russian military and their families. The project states that Russian servicemen can submit an application to surrender through various methods including calling the round-the-clock hotline, or following instructions from a chatbot on the project's Telegram. They are then given instructions on how to practically surrender to one of the Ukrainian military formations, such as the Armed Forces of Ukraine, the Territorial Defence Forces, the National Police, the National Guard, or the Security Service of Ukraine.

The Prosecutor-General of Russia blocked access to the website of "I Want to Live" in October 2022, but it remained operational. On 4 May 2023, the hotline's spokesperson Vitaliy Matvienko stated that it received requests to surrender from 3200 Russian soldiers in April 2023, representing a 10% increase over March 2023. He added that the hotline had received a total of 16,000 requests to surrender since its inception. Its website had been accessed over 36 million times, 32 million visits of which were made from the territory of the Russian Federation. (Note: The official statement in Ukrainian reads: "3200 росіян висловили бажання здатись у полон у квітні. Проєкт «Хочу жить». Про це на пресконференції в Military Media Center розповів спікер державного проєкту здачі в полон російських та білоруських військових "Хочу жить" Віталій Матвієнко. – За квітень кількість звернень у нас зросла, порівняно з березнем 2023 року, на 10% і становить 3200 звернень, – зазначив він. Віталій Матвієнко також розповів, що загалом, за час існування проєкту, отримано понад 16 тисяч звернень і сайт відвідало більш як 36 мільйонів осіб. 32 мільйони з них – з території російської федерації." In English: "3,200 Russians expressed a desire to surrender in April. Project "I Want to Live". Vitaliy Matvienko, spokesman for the state project for the surrender of Russian and Belarusian servicemen "I Want to Live", told this at a press conference at the Military Media Centre. "In April, the number of applications increased by 10% compared to March 2023, and amounted to 3,200 applications," he said. Vitaliy Matvienko also said that since the project's inception, more than 16,000 applications have been received, and the website has been visited by more than 36 million people. 32 million of them came from the territory of the Russian Federation.")

The I Want to Live project website states that Ukrainian authorities will treat prisoners of war in compliance with the Geneva Conventions. Surrendering Russians soldiers are said to be guaranteed the right to life and the prohibition of torture in accordance with international law. POWs are to be offered three meals a day, legal support, and medical attention once their application to surrender has been approved. Soldiers in Russian service who voluntarily hand over their weapons and military equipment would reportedly also be given amnesty. To those who have surrendered, the Ukrainian authorities offer the opportunity to call their relatives and friends, and to take part in a prisoner exchange organized between the governments of Russia and Ukraine, or to remain temporarily in detention with the possibility of staying in Ukraine or emigrating later. Some individual Russian soldiers have been reported as surrendering to Ukraine, and then given permission to join the Ukrainian military instead. For example, a Yekaterinburg tank driver was the only surviving crew member when his tank was destroyed; surrendering to the Ukrainians using a white flag, he was surprised that he was not tortured (as he feared). Believing a return to Russia impossible, he later joined their side to repair captured Russian tanks and armoured vehicles.

In March 2026, Forbes published an article describing Ukraine using robots and drones to capture Russian soldiers. One instance mentioned was in 2024, when a video showcased a Russian soldier surrendering when a Ukrainian drone approached with a loudspeaker bringing instructions. In January 2026, footage appeared of three Russian soldiers surrendering to a Ukrainian unmanned ground vehicle.

As more than 250 Russian soldiers were captured in a Ukrainian offensive in Donetsk by the 3rd Army Corps, a commander of the unit said that Russian propaganda tells Russian soldiers they will be tortured and killed if captured, resulting in Russian soldiers blowing themselves up to avoid capture.

=== Mistreatment of captured Russian soldiers ===
==== Public exposure of Russian POWs ====
Since 27 February, the Ukrainian Ministry of Internal Affairs has shared on social media photos and videos of killed Russian soldiers, soon followed by dozens of videos of prisoners of war under interrogation, sometimes blindfolded or bound, revealing their names and personal information, and expressing regret over their involvement in the invasion. The videos have raised concerns about potential violations of Article 13 Third Geneva Convention, which states that prisoners of war should be protected "against insults and public curiosity." On 7 March, Amnesty International released a statement saying that "it is essential that all parties to the conflict fully respect the rights of prisoners of war," and saying that filmed prisoners of war and their families could be put at risk of reprisals following repatriation to Russia.

On 16 March, Human Rights Watch described the videos as intentional humiliation and shaming, and urged the Ukrainian authorities to stop posting them on social media and messaging apps. Analogous concerns were expressed by various Western newspapers. A spokeswoman for the UN High Commissioner for Human Rights, Elizabeth Throssell, said that the videos, if genuine, were likely to be incompatible with human dignity and current international humanitarian law. Interviewed by Der Spiegel, international law expert Daniel-Erasmus Khan said that "letting POWs call home is actually a good thing, filming it and putting it online however is not," as it was incompatible with the Geneva Convention on the treatment of prisoners of war.

==== Torture of Russian and separatist soldiers ====
Some Russian and Russian-affiliated prisoners of war who were in the hands of Ukrainian forces made allegations of summary executions, torture and ill-treatment by members of the Ukrainian forces, in some cases, Russian prisoners were stabbed and subjected to electric torture. Ukraine later launched criminal investigations into allegations of mistreatment of Russian prisoners of war by the Ukrainian Armed Forces.

According to the 26 March 2022 OHCHR report, the HRMMU was aware of one allegation of a threat of sexual violence by a Ukrainian soldier, in which "a captured Russian military member was threatened with castration on camera".

As of 31 July 2022, OHCHR documented 50 cases of torture and ill-treatment of prisoners of war in the power of Ukraine, including cases of Russian and separatist soldiers being beaten, kicked or shot during capture or interrogation, some also reported suffering electrocution and positional torture while under interrogation. One prisoner of war was reportedly suffocated by Ukrainian policemen of the Kharkiv SBU during his interrogation. Many Russian and separatist soldiers also reported "horrible conditions" during transport to POW camps, with many being stripped naked and having their wrists tied.

===== Torture of Russian POWs in Mala Rohan =====
According to a report by the UN High Commissioner for Human Rights (OHCHR), members of Ukrainian armed forces shot the legs of three captured Russian soldiers and tortured Russian soldiers who were wounded. The incident is likely to have occurred on the evening of 25 March in Mala Rohan, south-east of Kharkiv, in an area recently recaptured by Ukrainian troops, and was first reported following the publication on social media accounts of a video of unknown authorship between 27 March and 28 March. One of the video's versions depicts a number of soldiers lying on the ground; many appear to be bleeding from leg wounds. Three prisoners are brought out of a vehicle and shot in the leg by someone off-camera. According to the OHCHR, as a documented case of summary execution and torture of prisoners of war, the incident qualifies as a war crime.

==== Execution of surrendering and captured Russian soldiers ====
===== 'No quarter' orders =====
On 2 March 2022, after the shelling of residential areas, Ukraine's Special Operations Forces threatened that Russian artillerymen will no longer be taken prisoner, but immediately killed. On 29 June, the OHCHR documented three incidents where Ukrainian servicemen and one incident where a Russian serviceman made public threats of giving no quarter to prisoners of war. Commander of the Georgian Legion Mamuka Mamulashvili denied such accusations.

===== Execution of Russian POWs in Dmytrivka =====
On 6 April a video apparently showing Ukrainian troops of the Georgian Legion executing captured Russian soldiers was posted on Telegram. The video was verified by The New York Times and by Reuters. A wounded Russian soldier was seemingly shot twice by a Ukrainian soldier while lying on the ground. Three dead Russian soldiers, including one with a head wound and hands tied behind his back, were shown near the soldier. The video appeared to have been filmed on a road north of the village of Dmytrivka, seven miles south of Bucha.

The Georgian Legion's commander Mamuka Mamulashvili acknowledged that killing of Russian prisoners of war was done under his own orders by a patrol of the Georgian Legion. Mamulashvili justified no quarter for Russian soldiers as a response to the Bucha massacre.

Mamuka Mamulashvili has also denied the allegations of war crimes by the Georgian Legion, saying the video does not show members of the Legion. Some Ukrainian authorities (such as Minister of Foreign Affairs Dmytro Kuleba) promised an investigation. While others took less clear positions.

===== Makiivka surrender incident =====
On 12 November, a video appeared on pro-Ukrainian websites showing the bodies of soldiers in Russian uniforms lying on the ground in a farmyard in the Makiivka area. On 17 November, more footage emerged, taken from the ground by a person at the scene. The video shows the Russian soldiers as they exit a building, surrender, and lay face down on the ground. Then another Russian soldier emerges from the same building and opens fire on the Ukrainian soldiers who are surprised. An aerial video from the site documents the aftermath, with at least 12 bodies of Russian soldiers, most positioned as they were when they surrendered, bleeding from gunshot wounds to the head.

The authenticity of the videos was verified by The New York Times. Russia and Ukraine accused each other of war crimes, with Russia accusing Ukraine of "mercilessly shooting unarmed Russian P.O.W.s," and Ukraine accusing the Russians of opening fire while surrendering. Ukraine's officials said the Prosecutor General’s office would investigate the video footage as the incident may qualify as a crime of "perfidy" committed by the Russian troops in feigning surrender. On 25 November the UN High Commissioner for Human Rights Volker Türk said “Our Monitoring Mission in Ukraine has conducted a preliminary analysis indicating that these disturbing videos are highly likely to be authentic in what they show” and called on the Ukrainian authorities to investigate the allegations of summary executions of Russian prisoners of war "in a manner that is – and is seen to be – independent, impartial, thorough, transparent, prompt and effective.”

===== Chosen Company executions =====
In 2024, German medical officer Caspar Grosse spoke to the New York Times about three incidents where members of Chosen Company, a foreign volunteer unit, executed Russian POWs. The New York Times noted that while Grosse's accounts are the only available evidence of the killings, they "are bolstered by his contemporaneous notes, video footage and text messages exchanged by members of the unit and reviewed by The Times."

In the first alleged incident dated August 2023, a severely injured, unarmed Russian soldier was crawling through a trench and begging for help in a mix of broken English and Russian. The Russian was then allegedly shot in the chest by a member of Chosen Company. When the Russian soldier continued to move and breathe, another fighter shot him in the head. In the second incident, a Chosen member lobbed a grenade at and killed a Russian soldier who allegedly had his hands raised. Video evidence of the incident was reviewed by the New York Times. In the third incident, Chosen members boasted in a group chat about killing Russian prisoners of war during a mission in October, text messages show. A soldier who was briefly in command that day alluded to the killings using a slang word for shooting. He said he would take responsibility. "If anything comes out about alleged POW blamming, I ordered it," wrote the soldier, who goes by the call sign Andok. He added an image of a Croatian war criminal who died in 2017 after drinking poison during a tribunal at The Hague and added the message "At the Hague ‘I regret nothing!’" under the image. The New York Times reported that this it was "one of several text messages" that make reference, directly or obliquely, to killing prisoners.

==== Prosecution of separatist POWs ====
The HRMMU also expressed concern about the prosecution of pro-Russian separatists for mere participation in the hostilities, which is prohibited under international humanitarian law. On 1 December 2023, two pro-Russian separatists from the Donbas were captured by Ukraine and were sentenced to 12 years in prison for treason. On 6 December 2023, a resident of Luhansk Oblast who was captured near Bilohorivka in May 2023 was sentenced to 12 years’ imprisonment for joining the Luhansk People's Militia.

=== Capture of North Korean soldiers ===
On January 11, 2025, Ukraine announced to have captured two wounded North Korean soldiers during the Kursk offensive, which were the first two North Korean prisoners of the war. The South Korean National Intelligence Service confirmed the North Korean origin of the two prisoners.

== Prisoner and human remains exchanges ==
Russia and Ukraine exchanged 206 prisoners of war through an agreement negotiated by the United Arab Emirates in September 2024. Under another agreement facilitated by the United Arab Emirates, Russia and Ukraine exchanged 190 prisoners of war in November 2024.

In February 2026, the Ukrainian authorities stated that about 7,000 prisoners of war were being held by Russia and nearly 4,000 prisoners of war were in Ukrainian custody. The International Committee of the Red Cross stated that to that date they had received about 200,000 requests from families on both sides regarding presumed prisoners of war or missing and possibly killed in action persons.

In April 2026, Russia returned the bodies or remains of 1,000 soldiers to Ukraine, and Ukraine returned the bodies of 41 soldiers to Russia during a repatriation exchange. Since 2022 over 70 repatriations of human remains had taken place.

In June 2026, Ukrainian investigators said that as a result of explosive devices being discovered in bodies of Ukrainian soldiers repatriated by Russia, mandatory safety checks are made before identification can begin.

== See also ==
- Allegations of genocide of Ukrainians in the Russo-Ukrainian War
- Casualties of the Russo-Ukrainian War and prisoners of war
- Russian war crimes and Ukraine
- Soviet atrocities committed against prisoners of war during World War II
- War crimes in Donbas
