= Aleksandr Nikulin (judge) =

Russian separatist judge

Aleksandr Nikulin (Russian: Александр Никулин) is a former Ukrainian judge who later served as a judge of the unrecognised judicial bodies of the self-proclaimed Donetsk People's Republic. He has been a DPR supreme court judge since 2019. In 2022, during the 2022 Russian invasion of Ukraine, he presided over the trial of captured Ukrainian and foreign soldiers who surrendered following the Siege of Mariupol and Azovstal plant. The event was described as a show trial, ending in June 2022 with the death penalty to foreign prisoners Britons Aiden Aslin, Shaun Pinner, and Moroccan Brahim Saadoune, with Nikulin describing them as "Nazi". On November 4, 2022, Nikulin was shot by unknown attackers in Vuhlehirsk and left in critical condition, in what appears to be an assassination attempt. Denis Pushilin, leader of the DPR, accused Ukraine of commanding the assassination.

== Biography ==
Aleksandr Nikulin graduated in 2002 from the Yaroslav Mudryi National Law Academy with a master's degree in law. He worked in the judiciary for several decades, including as a judge of the Donetsk Administrative Court of Appeal.

In July 2015, the Verkhovna Rada dismissed him from his judicial post upon his own request for retirement, a procedure which entitled him to lifelong judicial remuneration. After the outbreak of the war in Donbas, Nikulin remained in separatist-controlled territory. He later taught arbitration procedure at the “Donetsk National University” established under DPR control.
