= Belogorovka =

Belogorovka may refer to:

- Belogorovka, a village in the Rostov Oblast in Russia
- Belogorovka, a village in the Ulyanovsk Oblast in Russia

== See also ==
- Bilohorivka, an equivalent toponym in the Ukrainian language
