= Roman Kuziv =

Ukrainian military physician, Lieutenant Colonel of the Medical Service

- Роман Кузів
- Born: 1989 (age 36–37)
- Military career
- Allegiance: Ukraine
- Branch: Armed Forces of Ukraine; Medical Forces Command
- Service years: 2017–present
- Rank: Colonel of the Medical Service
- Commands: Military Medical Clinical Centre of the Eastern Region (2026–present); Zaporizhzhia Military Hospital (2022–2026); Medical Forces Group "East" (acting, 2024)
- Wars: War in Donbas; Russian invasion of Ukraine
- Awards: Order of Bohdan Khmelnytsky, 2nd & 3rd Class

Roman Kuziv (Ukrainian: Роман Кузів; born 1989) is a Ukrainian military doctor, surgeon, and Colonel of the Medical Service in the Armed Forces of Ukraine. Since 2026 he has commanded the Military Medical Clinical Centre of the Eastern Region (VMKTs SR) in Dnipro, one of the regional clinical centres of the Medical Forces of Ukraine's Armed Forces. From May 2022 to 2026 he commanded the Zaporizhzhia Military Hospital, becoming the youngest officer to head a Ukrainian military hospital. In 2024 he also served as acting commander of the Medical Forces Group "East" (Schid), responsible for military medical services along the eastern and southern fronts.

Kuziv initiated Ukraine's first underground front-line surgical hospital, developed in 2024 with Metinvest as part of the Rinat Akhmetov–backed "Steel Front" initiative. On 29 June 2022 he led the convoy of 25 medical evacuation crews that returned 144 Ukrainian prisoners of war from Russian-controlled territory in the largest prisoner exchange up to that point of the full-scale invasion, including 95 defenders of Azovstal.

== Early life and medical training ==
Kuziv pursued medical studies in Ukraine and qualified as a surgeon. In 2014, at the start of the war in Donbas, he was 25 years old and completing his medical internship at a regional hospital. He volunteered for the Armed Forces of Ukraine but was rejected because his training was incomplete. He finished his internship in the summer of 2015 and worked part-time as an emergency surgeon at a district hospital while assembling the documents required for military service.

== Military career ==
=== Pre-invasion service (2016–2022) ===
Kuziv was commissioned with the rank of Junior Lieutenant in late 2016 and posted to a Territorial Recruitment Centre. After three months he was deployed for almost eighteen months with the 10th Separate Mountain Assault Brigade in the Donbas, serving in Popasna, Lysychansk, Vrubivka, and Sievierodonetsk. He worked successively as ward doctor in the operating-and-dressing department, head of that department, acting commander of the medical company, and acting head of the brigade's medical service.

Following a period at the Mukachevo Military Hospital and a return to a Territorial Recruitment Centre, Kuziv petitioned the then-commander of the Medical Forces, Major General Ihor Khomenko, for a transfer back to a combat-zone posting. He was appointed deputy commander of the 66th Military Mobile Hospital in Donetsk Oblast.

=== Full-scale invasion ===
At the start of the full-scale Russian invasion on 24 February 2022, Kuziv was based at the 66th Mobile Military Hospital in Pokrovsk. As the senior officer present, he placed the unit on full combat readiness and dispersed elements of the hospital across multiple positions. Within the first 24 hours the hospital received approximately 300 wounded; some 22 operating tables were in simultaneous use during the most intense period.

==== Azovstal prisoner exchange ====
In May 2022 Kuziv was appointed commander of the Zaporizhzhia Military Hospital. On 29 June 2022 he organised and personally led a convoy of 25 medical and ambulance crews onto Russian-occupied territory to receive Ukrainian prisoners of war. The operation returned 144 servicemembers, including 95 defenders of the Azovstal Iron and Steel Works in Mariupol (43 of them from the Azov Brigade). The exchange — the largest such prisoner exchange between Russia and Ukraine since the start of the full-scale invasion at the time — was overseen on the Ukrainian side by the Main Directorate of Intelligence of the Ministry of Defence.

=== Command of the Zaporizhzhia Military Hospital (2022–2026) ===
Under Kuziv's command, the Zaporizhzhia Military Hospital was placed on a wartime footing as part of the Defence Forces of Zaporizhzhia. He has overseen a roughly seven-fold expansion of staff and significant changes to the hospital's surgical capability, including the introduction of laparoscopic techniques in the management of combat wounds. Tens of thousands of operations have been carried out at the facility during his tenure.

In 2024 Kuziv was assigned the additional duties of acting commander of the Medical Forces Group "East", responsible for organising medical services along the eastern and southern sectors of the front.

=== Underground hospital initiative ===
Kuziv initiated and helped design Ukraine's first underground front-line surgical hospital, sometimes referred to by Ukrainian medics as the Andergraund or shpital. After a stabilisation point in his sector was struck a reported 16 times, he proposed adapting Metinvest's steel "hideout" bunker modules — then already in production as front-line shelters — into a buried "role 2" surgical facility, and worked with Metinvest engineers on its design and configuration.

The first such facility, financed by Metinvest under Rinat Akhmetov's "Steel Front" initiative, opened in September 2024 in the Zaporizhzhia Oblast. It is approximately 500 square metres in area, located around six metres below ground, and equipped with a triage reception, operating theatres, an intensive-care unit, a laboratory and autonomous life-support systems. The structure was tested against anti-tank mines and aerial munitions before commissioning. A second underground stabilisation point opened in Donetsk Oblast in 2025 with a revised configuration.

According to figures cited by Metinvest, more than 6,000 wounded Ukrainian servicemembers had been treated at the first underground hospital within its first year of operation. Kuziv has stated that he sees a need for at least twelve such facilities along the front line, and the Ministry of Defence subsequently approved a further 20 underground "role 2" hospitals. The model has been described in international coverage, including in The Economist and the Swedish daily Dagens Nyheter, as the first deployment of an advanced underground surgical unit of its kind.

=== Command of the Eastern Region Military Medical Clinical Centre (2026–) ===
In 2026 Kuziv was appointed to head the Military Medical Clinical Centre of the Eastern Region (VMKTs SR), based in Dnipro and registered as Military Unit А4615. The centre, established in 2019, is a multi-profile clinical institution of the Medical Forces of Ukraine's Armed Forces, with origins as a military hospital in the city dating to the early 20th century.

== Awards and decorations ==
Kuziv has been decorated for his service during the Russo-Ukrainian War. His awards include the Order of Bohdan Khmelnytsky, 3rd Class — awarded in the first presidential decoration list issued after the start of the full-scale invasion in February 2022 — and the Order of Bohdan Khmelnytsky, 2nd Class, awarded for the medical support of the 2023 Ukrainian counteroffensive.

== See also ==
- Healthcare in Ukraine
- Russian invasion of Ukraine
- Siege of Mariupol
