= SIZO-2 =

Torture prison in Taganrog, Russia

Coordinates: 47.2291°N 38.9066°E

- Interactive map of SIZO-2
- Location: Taganrog
- Status: operational
- Managed by: FSIN
- Warden: Aleksandr Shtoda

Taganrog SIZO-2 (Russian: СИЗО-2, (Note: Следственный изолятор) Russian pronunciation: [sʲɪˈzo dva]; lit. 'pre-trial detention centre #2') (Note: Officially: Russian: ФКУ СИЗО-2 ГУФСИН России по Ростовской области; lit. 'Federal Governmental Institution "Pre-trial Detention Centre-2" of the Russian Governmental Federal Penitentiary Service in Rostov Oblast') is a detention facility in Taganrog, Russia. Built in the 19th century as a juvenile detention centre, in 2022 it was converted into a torture prison holding mainly Ukrainian inmates, both civilians and prisoners of war. According to journalistic investigations, SIZO-2 is one of the most violent Russian prisons, with daily torture and starvation.

The cells of the facility are overcrowded and heavily surveiled. SIZO-2 has dedicated torture chambers where detainees are interrogated and forced to sign false confessions. Prisoners have no contact with the outside world and the vast majority have no legal representation because their lawyers cannot enter the facility.

Several prisoners have died in SIZO-2, including Ukrainian journalist Victoria Roshchyna.

== Facility ==
Taganrog is a south-western Russian town; the Russia–Ukraine border is located about 40 km West from the city. SIZO-2's address is 175 Lenin Street; it is a walled facility with three watchtowers, barbed wire on top of all fences and a metal gate. It was originally built in 1808 and used as a youth detention centre that also held mothers with young children. After the beginning of the full-scale invasion of Ukraine in 2022, along with at least 29 other sites it was converted into a torture prison for Ukrainians.

After Mariupol was captured by Russians in May 2022, several high-profile city defenders were moved to SIZO-2, including soldiers from the Azov Brigade. Satellite footage shows that SIZO-2 was repaired in the summer of that year; works included the installation of a new steel roof.

The current total occupancy of SIZO-2 is unknown; pre-2022, the maximum number of detainees was 400, but the Viktoriia Project, a joint investigation by several media outlets, concluded that the actual number of people held inside is much bigger, based on satellite imagery and food orders made by the facility.

Cells are 3 by 5 metres (9.8 by 16.4 ft) with 3—5 inmates held in each. Every cell has bunk beds or regular beds, a table and a portrait of Putin. Cell doors in SIZO-2 have peepholes, and sometimes prisoners are told that they are not allowed to leave the field of view of the guards. In general, inmates are not allowed to sit or lie down during the day, which is monitored through the peepholes and via security cameras installed inside cells. The cell lights are never turned off.

SIZO-2 has dedicated interrogation rooms that are empty except for torture devices.

All inmates are woken up at 6:00 am and required to clean their cells; the morning check happens at 7:00 or 7:30, then the prisoners get breakfast, and interrogations start at 8:00 am. Some inmates are made to run to the prison yard and back once a week as physical exercise.

== Prisoners ==
Many prisoners of SIZO-2 are civilians; a lot of them are held with no formal charges and cannot communicate with anyone outside of the prison. They also cannot receive food parcels, ordered online by their relatives. Human rights activist Vladimir Zhbankov commented on the lack of legal basis for detentions in facilities akin to SIZO-2: "even in Stalin's time there were always charges." According to OHCHR spokesman Kris Janowski, holding prisoners of war in a regular prison is a violation of the international humanitarian law. Sometimes family members are informed about the fact of an inmate's arrest, but not given the name of the specific facility; they learn about their relative's whereabouts from testimonies of former detainees who shared the same cell.

Mediazona reports that SIZO-2 was closed for visitors in May 2022, after the arrival of the first Ukrainian prisoners. According to Viktoriia Project, most lawyers cannot access SIZO-2; if a lawyer attempts to enter the facility, they are shown a written refusal signed by the prisoner who they wanted to represent. The ones who do get inside, report extreme distress from the danger to themselves and from witnessing the condition of the prisoners. When one of the detainees, Hryhorii Sinchenko, said that he does not know where he is being held and that prison guards beat him daily during a court hearing (he participated via a video call), his connection was immediately cut.

In 2024, Russian human rights NGO Memorial reported that, in addition to Ukrainians, SIZO-2 held prisoners from Chechnya and Dagestan.

Journalist Victoria Roshchyna was brought into SIZO-2 in 2023 and died there in 2024 after extensive torture. When Ukraine received Roshchyna's body, they discovered that several of her internal organs had been removed, including her eyeballs and brain, which was likely done to conceal the cause of death.

== Torture ==
Former inmates describe SIZO-2 as one of the most violent prisons in Russia, with daily beatings. All known former prisoners have reported that they were tortured in SIZO-2. According to Viktoriia Project, in spring 2022, FSIN employees were encouraged to use violence against inmates. Human rights activist Oleg Orlov stated that, while forced disappearance of dissidents has been employed before, the scale and level of torture in Taganrog is extreme even by Russian standards.

SIZO-2 is one of many similar detention centres for Ukrainians where prisoners are frequently tortured; according to Alice Edwards, the UN special rapporteur on torture, Russian war torture is systematic and was sanctioned by the top government officials, with "serious cases of torture, including mock executions, all types of beatings, electricity being applied to ears and genitals and other parts of the body, waterboarding, as well as threats and actual rapes and sexual violence."

Newly arrived inmates are beaten as soon as they arrive; it is called "priyomka". (Note: Russian: приёмка, lit. 'reception') Guards in balaclavas frequently engage in verbal and physical abuse; they hit prisoners during twice daily checks, when prisoners have to stand in the corridor facing the wall, with their legs apart, receiving beatings from behind, shocks from tasers and strangulation. Masked operatives torture them during interrogations. Torture is administered by agents from FSB and special units of FSIN; afterwards, inmates are forced to sign false confessions that are later used against them in courts. All prison guards conceal their faces and use call signs instead of personal names. The prison guards are locals, but the FSIN operatives come from other cities and regions of Russia and are rotated after several weeks.

Detainees displaying any signs of Ukrainian patriotism (such as having tattoos with national symbols or speaking Ukrainian) or resisting the guards are subjected to more extreme torture, such as being tied upside-down to wall-attached bars and beaten, or drowning in tubs. Other methods of torture include physical restraint, electric shocks (phone call to Putin, electric chair), forced stress positions, rape, as well as psychological torture such as forced nudity, rape threats and others. Muslim inmates are forbidden to pray and use any Islam-related words. If a detainee faints during torture, guards use smelling salts to return them to consciousness and resume torture afterwards. Former inmates say that hearing the screams of tortured victims was one of the worst experiences of their detainment.

Former detainees say that they were forbidden to laugh or smile and had to learn patriotic Russian poems, songs and the Russian anthem. SIZO-2 prisoners are held in the state of near starvation: they get food only once a day, and it consists of several spoons of watery soup or pasta, sometimes mouldy or with floating cockroaches. Access to water is often limited or denied; tap water has greenish colour and a foul smell. Inmates lose a lot of weight while in SIZO-2.

Former inmates report that no medical care is administered, but the resident paramedic does call for an ambulance for serious conditions; however, it can take many hours or even a day for the doctors to arrive. At least 15 prisoners of war died in SIZO-2: some from torture, including "priyomka", while others committed suicide. In 2022, Polish citizen Krzysztof Galos died in SIZO-2 due to extensive torture.

The most extreme cases of torture occurred in SIZO-2 in 2022. As of early 2025, some reports indicate that the conditions there have improved. Now it is commonly used to scare prisoners of war and other detainees held in other facilities. According to Memorial, those Ukrainian inmates who have not had an active criminal case open against them were moved to the SIZO-3 in Kizel; the rest are still kept there.

== Administration ==
Heads of SIZO-2:

- ?—2022: Gennady Bodnar
- from 2022: podpolkovnik Aleksandr Shtoda

When contacted by journalists in 2025, most current and former employees of SIZO-2, including Shtoda, either did not respond to requests, or denied that they work there. Two others confirmed their employment in SIZO-2, but denied that the conditions are unfavourable for the prisoners.

=== Sanctions ===
On 20 November 2025, several Russian nationals among the heads and deputies of the SIZO-2 has been sanctioned by the European Union for involved in the torture of Ukrainian POWs and civilians, politically motivated persecution of journalists, human rights defenders, and other categories of its prisoners.

One of the sanctioned individuals is Andrei Polyakov, head of the Federal Penitentiary Service in the Rostov region, who was responsible for conditions at SIZO-2. Under his supervision at SIZO-2, the Ukrainian prisoners were subjected to beatings, torture, starvation, and lack of medical care, resulting in the death of Ukrainian journalist Viktoria Roshchyna. During interrogations, they faced both psychological and physical coercion, including severe beatings, electric shocks, and threats, in an effort to force them to confess to alleged war crimes, terrorism crimes, or other crimes.

The sanction list also includes the chief of SIZO-2, Aleksandr Shtoda, and his deputies Andrei Mikhailichenko and Andrei Sapitsky. Alexander Shtoda, Andrey Mykhaylichenko, and Andrei Sapitsky (deputy head of Taganrog SIZO-2 for personnel and educational work) are responsible for their role in creating inhumane conditions of detention, torture, and other human rights violations, large-scale and systematic torture and other cruel, inhuman, and degrading treatment of Ukrainian detainees, both civilian and military, as well as other detainees held at this facility.

On 13 July 2026, European Union also sanctioned SIZO-2 itself, imposing an asset freeze and prohibiting EU citizens and organisations to provide money to it.
