= Yurii Kovalchuk =

Ukrainian soldier (1998–2022)

- Юрій Олександрович Ковальчук
- Born: 15 May 1998; Kovel, Volyn Oblast, Ukraine
- Died: 23 May 2022 (aged 24) near the village of Bilohorivka, Luhansk Oblast, Ukraine
- Military career
- Allegiance: Ukraine
- Branch: Ukrainian Ground Forces
- Service years: 2018–2021; 2021–2022
- Unit: 14th Mechanized Brigade
- Conflicts: Russo-Ukrainian War; Russian invasion of Ukraine; Northern Ukraine campaign; Eastern Ukraine campaign; Battle of Donbas †
- Awards: Order of the Gold Star (posthumously)

Yurii Oleksandrovych Kovalchuk (Ukrainian: Юрій Олександрович Ковальчук; May 15, 1998 – May 23, 2022) was a Ukrainian military officer and participant in the Russo-Ukrainian War, and posthumous recipient of the Hero of Ukraine, the highest state award in Ukraine.

== Biography ==
Kovalchuk was born on May 15, 1998, in Kovel, Volyn Oblast.

In March 2018, he enlisted and signed a three-year contract with the Armed Forces of Ukraine. He served in the 14th Mechanized Brigade. Participant of the Joint Forces Operation.

In 2021, he was demobilized and enlisted for the second time for the same period, and served again in the 14th Mechanized Brigade.

During the Russian invasion, he took part in the Battle of Kyiv and Northern Ukraine campaign, and in battles in Chernihiv and Izium. He was killed in action on May 23, 2022, during the Battle of Donbas, near the village of Bilohorivka, Luhansk region.

He was buried in the Alley of Heroes cemetery in his hometown of Kovel in western Ukraine.

== Awards ==
- the title of Hero of Ukraine with the Order of the Golden Star (July 8, 2023, posthumously) – for personal courage and heroism displayed in the defense of state sovereignty and territorial integrity of Ukraine, selfless service to the Ukrainian people;
- Order "For Courage", III class (March 16, 2022) – for personal courage and selfless actions in the defense of state sovereignty and territorial integrity of Ukraine, loyalty to the military oath;
- Medal "For Military Service to Ukraine" (May 2, 2022) – for personal courage and selfless actions in the defense of state sovereignty and territorial integrity of Ukraine, loyalty to the oath of allegiance;
- Honorary Citizen of the City of Kovel (July 28, 2022, posthumously).
