= Doxa (magazine) =

Russian online student magazine

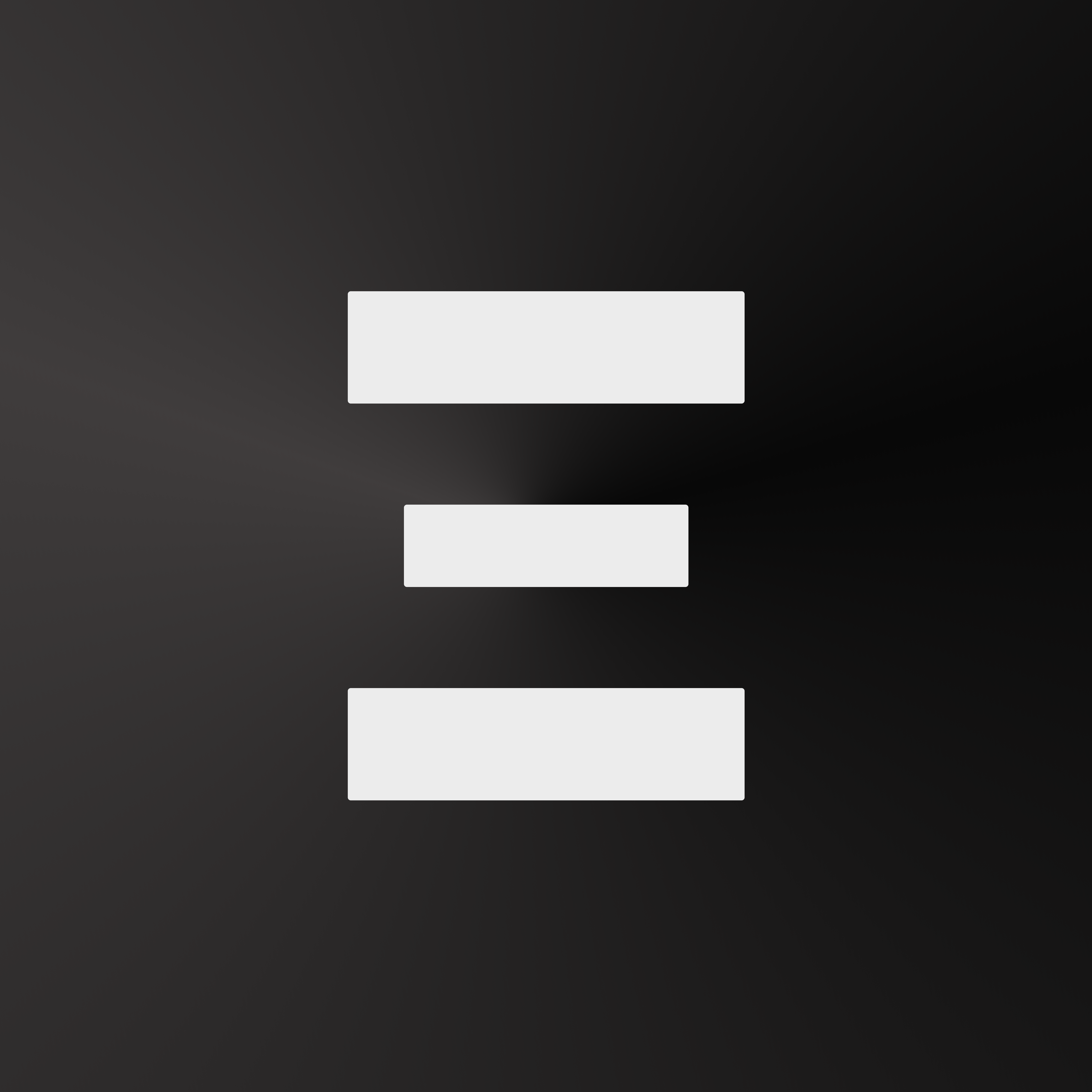
- Publisher: Mnenie media z.s.
- Founded: 2017; 9 years ago
- Country: Russia
- Based in: Czech Republic
- Language: Russian
- Website: doxa.team

Doxa (stylized in all caps) is a Russian online progressive and anti-war magazine.

== History ==
The magazine was founded in 2017 by students at the Higher School of Economics in Moscow and named after the Ancient Greek term doxa ('belief'). Initially only focusing on university affairs, the magazine soon began covering student human rights activism, including struggles against sexual harassment and academic censorship, and in opposition to the Putin regime, where many students often played significant roles.

After mass arrests in the 2019 Moscow protests, including two Doxa journalists, the magazine launched a project called Here We Stand, offering digital resources against police brutality. In December 2019, the Higher School of Economics university board cut its funding of the magazine, alleging that the magazine was harming the university's reputation and harboured a political agenda.

In May 2020, the magazine ran a series of articles on sexual harassment at Moscow State University.

In January 2021, Roskomnadzor forced the magazine to delete a video covering the 2021 Russian protests. The video had discussed pressures students faced ahead of the protests and the threats of expulsions students faced for participating in the protests. The magazine then filed a lawsuit against Roskomnadzor contesting the order to delete the video.

In April 2021, Russian police raided the magazine's office as well as the apartments of several of the editors' families. Four of the magazine's editors, Armen Aramyan, Natalya Tyshkevich, Vladimir Metyolkin and Alla Gutnikova, were then charged by the Investigative Committee of Russia with encouraging minors to take part in illegal activity. Human rights groups raised concerns about the arrests, claiming that they were made in an attempt to suppress freedom of the press in Russia. Amnesty International stated that "the Russian authorities' intention is transparent. Investigations into corruption will not be tolerated, mobilizing youth to actively and peacefully participate in society will be prosecuted, and those journalists and media outlets who receive foreign funding will be ostracized and labelled as foreign agents."

On April 15, 2021, Judith Butler, Étienne Balibar, Slavoj Žižek, Boris Groys, and hundreds other foreign scholars signed an open letter in support of Doxa, calling the charges against it "a means of silencing critics". More than 120 HSE University faculty members signed a letter in support of the detained journalists published on the website Troitsky Variant. On April 29, the human rights center Memorial recognized Armen Aramyan, Vladimir Metelkin, Natalia Tyshkevich, and Alla Gutnikova as political prisoners.

Later that month, the Moscow City Court upheld the decision to impose pretrial restrictions on the editors, confining them to house arrest but allowing the editors to spend up to two hours outside per day. In April 2022, after spending a year under house arrest, the four editors were sentenced to two years of correctional labour. Later that year, authorities put condemned editors on Russian want list.

Following the 2022 Russian invasion of Ukraine, the magazine published a guide for Russian youth on how to talk to their older relatives and co-workers about the invasion, including a list of rebuttals to common pro-war talking points. Roskomnadzor demanded that the magazine delete the guide. On February 25, 2022, the outlet published an anti-war statement on its Patreon page; as a result, on August 7 the Russian Prosecutor General’s Office also blocked access to the platform.

In 2023, the magazine was awarded the Student Peace Prize for their work exposing corruption and sexual harassment at universities, documenting state persecution, and fighting government disinformation.

In early 2024, the Russian Prosecutor General’s Office designated Doxa as an "undesirable organization". State Duma lawmaker Vasily Piskaryov accused Doxa of being involved in "training sabotage activities on Russian territory".

On August 30, 2024, the Doxa’s Telegram channel was designated as "extremist" in Belarus.

During Russia’s full-scale war against Ukraine, the authorities have handed down harsh prison sentences in absentia against several Doxa’s editors. In 2024, Maria Menshikova was sentenced to seven years for "justification of terrorism" over two posts that encouraged readers to write letters to political prisoners. Less than two months later, Daria Manzhura was placed on a wanted list under an undisclosed article of the Criminal Code and added to the state register of "terrorists and extremists." In 2025, Armen Aramyan was sentenced to more than ten years in prison for "justification of terrorism" and "war-related fake news" after publishing a map marking civilians killed by Russian soldiers in Bucha.

In November 2025, Russia’s Ministry of Justice designated Doxa as a "foreign agent" and listed 28 individuals as "participants of a foreign agent".

== Political position ==
The magazine's editors have described the magazine as pro-feminist but not specifically left-wing, stating that:

We write about the problems Russian students have, and it turns out that regardless of our views (many in the editorial office do have leftist views) the language for these problems also happens to be left wing. When you write about discrimination against women, the sexual harassment of female students and female university employees, about work-related issues among teachers – their lack of job security, and increasing precarity – you notice that the criticism of these phenomena is steeped in a left, anti-capitalist and anti-patriarchal language. The upshot is that we also speak in this language, otherwise there is no way we can articulate the problems faced by teachers and students in Russian universities.

The magazine has also spoken out against the commercialisation of post-secondary education in Russia.

On February 24th, 2022, the editorial board denounced Russia’s war against Ukraine, calling it "a war crime carried out in the name of all Russians":

For all 20 years of Putin’s rule, the state has been imprisoning politicians, branding opposition organizations as "extremist", and brutally persecuting independent media (including ours). It has done everything in its power to silence us and prevent us from speaking out against this senseless slaughter. We did not decide to start this war. But only we, Russians, can stop it. Our magazine will continue to cover Russia’s military invasion of Ukraine and give a voice to those who oppose it. We call on our readers not to stay on the sidelines. Today, all of us are responsible for a shared future in which the lives of millions are not controlled by mad politicians.

Doxa’s English-language page states:

The Russian state is trying to silence us. It is afraid of us, afraid of our readers-but we will not stop. We will continue to give voice to Russia’s politically active youth, we will continue to support the progressive movement that wants freedom and democracy in Russia. Putin’s regime is a threat to our freedom. Let’s fight it together.
