= Gutnikov =

Gutnikov (masculine) or Gutnikova (feminine) is a last name. Notable people with this last name include:

- Alla Gutnikova (born 1998), Russian journalist, human rights activist, and actress
- Boris Gutnikov (1931–1986), Soviet violinist
- Grigory Gutnikov (Grigorij Goutnikov) (born 1974), Russian cross-country skier
