= Alla Gutnikova =

Russian journalist (born 1998)

- Алла Гутникова
- Born: 25 April 1998 (age 28); Moscow, Russia
- Education: Higher School of Economics
- Occupations: Journalist, human rights activist

Alla Mikhailovna Gutnikova (Russian: Алла Михайловна Гутникова; born 25 April 1998) is a Russian journalist, human rights activist and actress.

Alla Gutnikova lived in Moscow. She has been a student at the National Research University Higher School of Economics, and an editor of DOXA Magazine.

In April 2021, Russian police raided the magazine's office as well as the apartments of several of the editors' families. Four of the magazine's editors, Armen Aramyan, Natalya Tyshkevich, Vladimir Metyolkin and Alla Gutnikova, were then charged by the Investigative Committee of Russia with encouraging minors to take part in illegal activity. Human rights groups raised concerns about the arrests, claiming that they were made in an attempt to suppress freedom of the press in Russia.

The four were accused of committing a crime of the Criminal Code of the Russian Federation (involvement by a group of persons of two or more minors in committing acts endangering the life of minors in information and telecommunication networks (including the Internet), up to 3 years in prison), in connection with the publication of a video message of solidarity with schoolchildren and students of opposition views before the rallies on 23 January 2021. On 14 April 2021 a preventive measure was formally chosen in the form of a ban on certain actions, effectively placing Gutnikova under house arrest.

On 12 April 2022 Gutnikova and her fellow editors were sentenced to two years' "corrective labour".

On 10 August 2022 Armen Aramyan said that all suspects in The DOXA case, including Alla Gutnikova, have left Russia and are safe.

== Filmography ==
- 2007: Thumbelina as elf (directed by Leonid Nechayev)
