= Aiden Aslin =

British foreign volunteer fighter (born 1994)

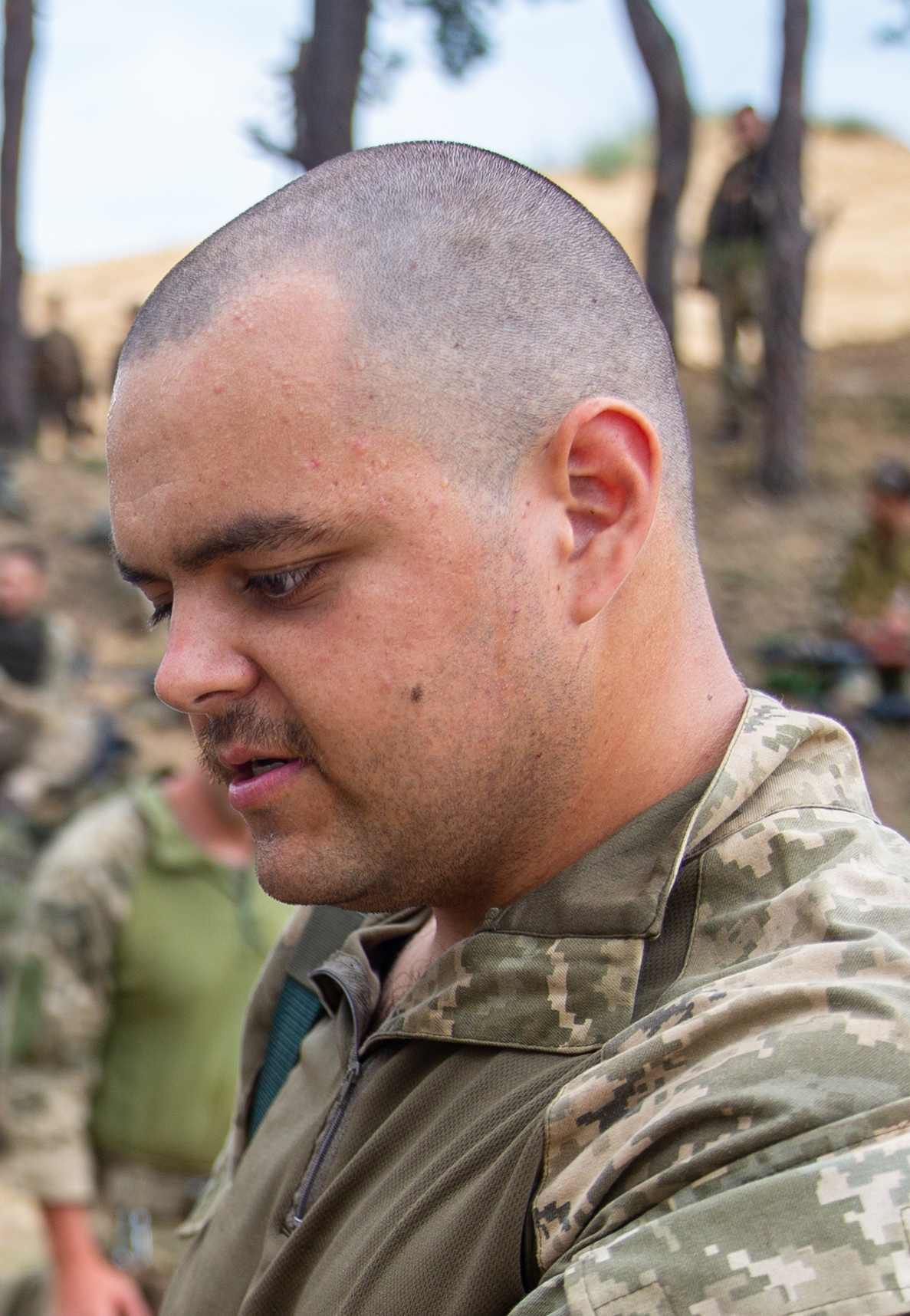
- Aslin in 2021
- Born: Aiden Daniel John Mark Aslin; 7 January 1994 (age 32); Newark, Nottinghamshire, England
- Military career
- Allegiance: Rojava; Ukraine
- Branch: Syrian Democratic Forces; Ukrainian Navy
- Service years: 2015–2016 (YPG); 2018–2022 (Ukraine)
- Nicknames: Rojhat Rojava, Johnny Wood, Cossack Gundi
- Units: People's Defence Unit; 36th Separate Marine Brigade
- Conflicts: Syrian Civil War; Rojava conflict; War against the Islamic State; Russo-Ukrainian War; War in Donbas; Russian invasion of Ukraine; Siege of Mariupol (surrendered)

Aiden Daniel John Mark Aslin (Ukrainian: Ейден Аслін; born 7 January 1994) is a British-Ukrainian soldier.

As a British citizen, he was captured by Russian forces in April 2022 while fighting as a Ukrainian Marine in Mariupol. He was sentenced to death on 9 June by authorities of the Russian-backed breakaway unrecognised puppet state, the Donetsk People's Republic (DPR), for "mercenary activities and committing actions aimed at seizing power and overthrowing the constitutional order of the DPR." He was released in a prisoner exchange in September 2022.

Before that, in 2015, Aslin travelled to Rojava, also known as the Autonomous Administration of North and East Syria (AANES). There, he served as a foreign volunteer for the Kurdish People's Defense Units (YPG), fighting against the Islamic State. Aslin was briefly detained upon his return to the United Kingdom. In 2018, he travelled to Ukraine and settled in Mykolaiv.

== Military service ==
=== Fighting ISIS in Rojava ===
In 2015, Aslin travelled to Rojava to join the YPG.

From 2015 to 2016 Aslin fought with the YPG International in Tel Abyad and al-Hasakah. He also participated in the 2015 al-Hawl offensive against Daesh (ISIS). He returned to the United Kingdom on 3 February 2016 and was arrested upon arrival. Aslin gained some media attention for protesting his treatment by Nottinghamshire Police in their investigation of his activities pursuant to the Terrorism Act "in the preparation to fight against Daesh" and possessing "articles for terrorist purposes in Iraq/Syria". The YPG is not a proscribed terror group in the UK and have received extensive support from the UK government, as a major ally of the US-led coalition force in Syria, but this did not protect Aslin from legal difficulties upon returning home. Charges were ultimately dropped and he returned to Rojava in 2016. Aslin has been critical of the international community's lack of support for the YPG, of the Turkish occupation of parts of Rojava, and of the sale of British weapons to Turkey for attacks against the Kurds.

=== Fighting Russia in Ukraine ===
In 2018, Aslin travelled to Ukraine and enlisted with the Ukrainian 36th Naval Infantry Brigade. In February 2022 he was deployed to Mariupol. On 12 April 2022 he surrendered to Russian forces who had been besieging the city since 24 February 2022. He appeared to have sustained injuries while in captivity and was interviewed on 18 April by British freelance journalist Graham Phillips. Geoffrey Robertson, a human rights barrister, called the interview a breach of the Geneva Conventions done for "propaganda purposes". Concerns about Aslin's treatment were subsequently raised by MP Robert Jenrick in the UK parliament.

After a complaint from Aslin's family, through their MP Robert Jenrick, Phillips' interview with Aslin was removed from YouTube. Aslin has since given several interviews, and a YouTube channel in his name was started. The channel was later terminated in August 2022 'after a legal complaint'.

== Trial in Russian-occupied Donetsk ==
On 30 April, the prosecutor-general for the illegal Russian proxy DPR falsely designated Aslin and two others as mercenaries (Article 47 of the Additional Protocol I of the Geneva Convention and the United Nations Mercenary Convention), indicated they could face the death penalty. DPR accused Aslin and two others of acting as mercenaries, beginning an investigation of "the commission of crimes by a group of persons (part 2 of article 34 of the Criminal Code of the DPR), on the forcible seizure of power or the forcible retention of power (Article 323 of the Criminal Code of the DPR) and on mercenarism (Article 440 Criminal Code of the DPR)", indicating they could face the death penalty if convicted. On 5 May, Aslin gave a digitally recorded statement to prosecutors that he fully understood what he was accused of, that he agreed with it fully "up to the part about murdering civilians" (which he denied), that he fought on the territory of the DPR, that he fought against the soldiers of the DPR in peaceful settlements, and that he used arms and weapons systems alongside other foreign nationals. Lawyers assigned to the three men during interrogations by the Russian military later made comments to the media expressing their support for the accession of Odesa, Kherson and Mykolaiv into the Russian Federation, support for the war against Ukraine, and support for the return of the death penalty to Russia. On 27 May, the prosecutor's office completed its investigation and announced charges on 6 June, stating the following:

"In the period from approximately December 2018 to April 2022 Shaun Pinner, Aiden John Mark Aslin, and Saadun Brahim acting deliberately by a group of persons by prior agreement as part of the armed forces of Ukraine, being on the territory of Donetsk People's Republic [DPR] in a time of war, being armed with firearms, took part in the preparation and military actions against the Armed Forces of the Donetsk People's Republic for the purpose of forcibly seizing and forcibly retaining power on the territory of DPR.”

— Prosecutor General's Office of the DPR (6 Jun 2022)

They were likewise accused of violating the "constitution" of the DPR by committing "terrorist acts, diversions, explosions, shelling from artillery, mortar [and] small arms" [against] "settlements, peaceful citizens, military of the Armed Forces of DPR," [and] "committing murders of the citizens of DPR, threatening of the civilians, who carried out their will during the referendum on May 11, 2014, which resulted in the forming of the state Donetsk People Republic."

While in captivity Aslin was interrogated on camera by Graham Phillips, a British national working for Russian propaganda. Aslin described his behavior as "psychotic" when filming the interview.

On 7 June Aslin, Pinner and Brahim were tried by the Supreme Court of the Donetsk People's Republic and Judge Aleksandr Nikulin, Aslin responded "Tak tochno [так точно]" (Note: A military response meaning affirmative.) when asked if he understood the information in his indictment and stated that he had no objections to proceeding with the trial. It is unclear if he had legal assistance during the proceedings. On 9 June the Court found the trio guilty on all charges, and stated that "[o]n the basis of the totality of crimes, Aslin Aiden, Pinner Sean and Saadun Brahim are finally given the death penalty as punishment." On 5 July, Aslin's defence team filed an appeal, requesting the dismissal of the verdict due to lack of corpus delicti.

On 21 September, the Ministry of Foreign Affairs of Saudi Arabia reported that Russia released ten foreign prisoners of war in a prisoner exchange after mediation by Mohammed bin Salman, Prime Minister of Saudi Arabia. According to his MP Robert Jenrick, Aiden Aslin was among the prisoners released.

Following his release, Aslin claimed in an interview that he was punched on the nose when his captors discovered that he was British and that he was tortured during his interrogation and his time in captivity.

=== Reaction ===
British Foreign Secretary Liz Truss called the verdict "a sham judgment with absolutely no legitimacy" and MP Robert Jenrick called the trial a "disgusting Soviet-era show trial". A spokesperson for Ukraine's foreign ministry said "Such public trials place the interests of propaganda above law and morality, and undermine the exchange mechanisms of war prisoners." The Office of the United Nations High Commissioner for Human Rights said that "[s]uch trials against prisoners of war amount to a war crime ... According to the chief command of Ukraine, all the men were part of the Ukrainian armed forces and if that is the case, they should not be considered as mercenaries ... Since 2015, we have observed that the so-called judiciary within these self-contained republics have not complied with essential fair trial guarantees, such as public hearings, independence, impartiality of the courts and the right not to be compelled to testify."

On 12 June, Denis Pushilin, head of the DPR, appeared to rule out an executive pardon for the defendants, as "[t]hey came to Ukraine to kill civilians for money ... I don't see any conditions for any mitigation or modification of the sentence." On 23 June, the BBC reported that Aslin had informed his family via telephone that he had been told by DPR officials that "time is running out" and that no attempts have been made by British government officials to negotiate on his behalf.

In November 2022, when trying to return to Ukraine, Aslin discovered a Schengen entry ban has been placed on his name by the German government, which resulted in the Polish border force denying him entry into the EU when arriving on a flight to Poland. Aslin believes this ban was placed in order to prevent re-use of his original passport captured by Russian authorities for a covert entry into EU.

== Personal life ==
Aslin was born in 1994. He lived in Newark, Nottinghamshire and worked as a carer.

Aslin is reported to have either a fiancée or a wife of Ukrainian descent and to have settled in the Mykolaiv area prior to the conflict. He became a Ukrainian citizen in July 2025.

Aslin goes by the online username "Cossack Gundi" on his public social media accounts.

== See also ==
- Russian information war against Ukraine
- Saadun Brahim
- Shaun Pinner
- Vjekoslav Prebeg
- Aleksandr Nikulin, judge.
