= Memorial Human Rights Defence Centre =

Russian human rights organisation

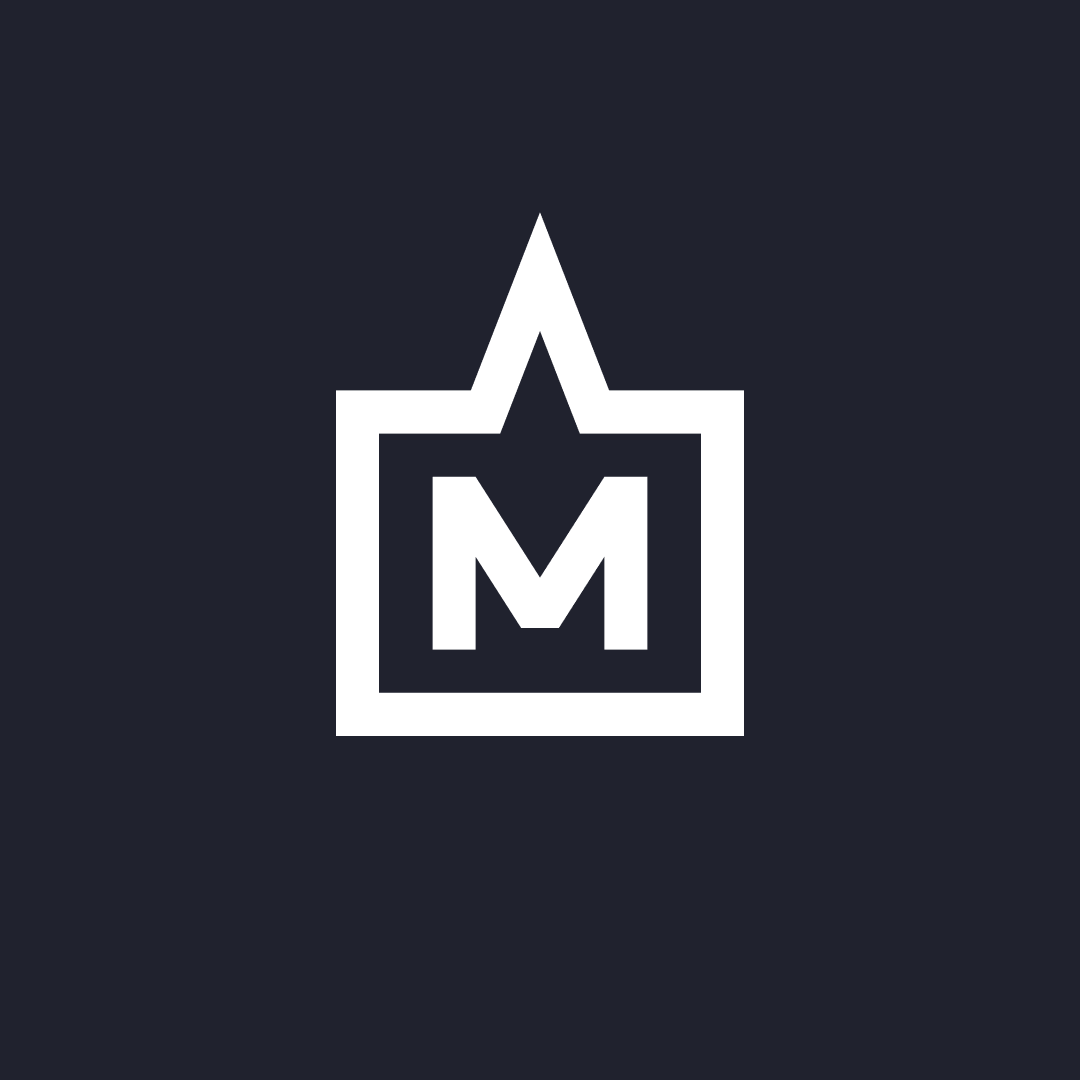
- Formation: 1992
- Type: Non-governmental organization
- Purpose: monitoring and documentation of human rights violations, legal assistance, and information support for political prisoners, refugees, migrants, conscripts
- Headquarters: Moscow, Russia
- Key people: Oleg Orlov, Svetlana Gannushkina, Alexander Cherkasov
- Website: Official website

Memorial Human Rights Defence Centre (Russian: Центр защиты прав человека «Мемориал»; previously Memorial Human Rights Centre) is a Russian interregional organization, deprived of the registration by the authorities.

The Centre compiles reports on human rights violations, creates lists of political prisoners and supports them, and provides legal and information support to refugees, migrants, and conscripts.

== History and activity of the Human Rights Center “Memorial” ==
=== History of the organization’s founding ===
On 29–30 January 1989 a constitutive conference of the All-Union Voluntary Historical and Educational Association "Memorial". The“Memorial” movement was one of the most massive in the USSR during the perestroika period and brought together people with very different views. Within the movement, like-minded groups were also formed, including those who were purposefully involved in human rights protection. Since 1989, within the framework of the general movement, there existed a Human Rights Group in Moscow and a Human Rights Commission of the All-Union "Memorial."

The Memorial Human Rights Center was established in January 1991, and the organization's charter was adopted on December 12, 1992, in April 1993 the charter was registered, and on November 25, 2002, the Memorial Human Rights Center was registered as a non-profit organization.

The non-profit organization Memorial Human Rights Center, which was part of the International Society Memorial, defined its mission as "promoting universal respect for and observance of human rights and fundamental freedoms" in the Russian Federation and other countries.

=== Activity ===
As part of its human rights work, the Human Rights Center «Memorial» conducted research on human rights violations and violations of international humanitarian law in areas of mass conflicts. Since the early 1990s, the HRC «Memorial» began sending expeditions to areas of military conflicts in Karabakh, Baku, South Ossetia, Transnistria, and Tajikistan. Among other humanitarian organizations, observers from «Memorial» worked in the North Caucasus during both Chechen wars. The presence of human rights defenders helped spread more comprehensive and accurate information about these wars and drew society's attention to them.

In 1992–1993, the HRC «Memorial» monitored the consequences of the civil war in Tajikistan. The organization's staff participated in a medical unit that assisted the wounded on both sides. The HRC «Memorial» took part in investigating the circumstances of the conflict and the deaths during the events of October 3–4, 1993, in Moscow. The organization's staff investigated the consequences of the Ossetian-Ingush conflict in 1993-1994 and documented human rights violations and violations of international humanitarian law during the first Chechen war.

In June 1995, Sergey Kovalyov's group mediated negotiations for the release of hostages in Budennovsk. Among those exchanged for hostages was Oleg Orlov, a member of the HRC «Memorial». The area of work related to mass conflict zones became known as «Hot Spots».

In 1996, the center launched the «Migration and Law» program, providing legal support to refugees and internally displaced persons. In 1999, under the leadership of Vitaly Ponomarev, the «Central Asia» project was initiated, which focused on monitoring political and religious persecutions in the region.

In 2000, the Human Rights Center «Memorial» began investigating the killing of over 50 civilians in the Chechen village of Novye Aldy. In the same year, the «Human Rights Protection Using International Mechanisms» program was launched.

In 2008, the Human Rights Center «Memorial» initiated the program «Support for Political Prisoners and Other Victims of Political Repression», providing assistance to individuals currently persecuted for political reasons.

The organization started publishing a named list of people in Russia deprived of their freedom for political, religious, and other reasons on its website.

In 2013, the Human Rights Center «Memorial» became the main partner of the «OVD-Info» project.

In November 2019, the «Human Rights Protection Using International Mechanisms» program — the «complaints generator» at the European Court of Human Rights (ECHR), created through the efforts of lawyers from the HRC «Memorial» and «OVD-Info» — has been launched.

In June 2020, at the initiative of the HRC «Memorial», 12 human rights organizations submitted their report on the human rights situation in Russia to the UN Human Rights Committee. A similar document for the 129th session of the Human Rights Committee was provided to the Russian authorities. However, according to human rights activists, many issues were not addressed in their version, and violations were presented in a deliberately justifying light.

=== Pressure on the organization and persecution of its employees ===
==== The Kidnapping of Oleg Orlov ====
The first case of persecution of employees of the Human Rights Center «Memorial» was the kidnapping of Oleg Orlov, which occurred in 2007 in Ingushetia. At the time of the incident, Oleg Orlov was the head of the organization. Orlov had come to the Ingush city of Nazran during mass protests against the policies of the head of the republic, Murat Zyazikov, extrajudicial reprisals, lawlessness, and corruption in the law enforcement agencies.

On the night of November 23–24, at the «Assa» hotel, which was considered the safest in Ingushetia and was under police supervision, individuals in balaclavas abducted Oleg Orlov and a film crew from the REN TV channel, took them in an unknown direction, and, threatening with death, demanded they no longer come to the republic.

A criminal case was initiated regarding the kidnapping under three articles of the Russian Criminal Code: «obstruction of the lawful professional activities of journalists» (Article 144, Part 1), «illegal entry into a dwelling with the use of violence» (Article 139, Part 2), and «robbery - open theft of someone else's property.» However, in 2011, the investigation was suspended, and the culprits were never found. In 2017, the European Court of Human Rights (ECHR) held the Russian authorities responsible for the kidnapping. In its ruling, the court noted that the investigation did not verify information about the involvement of security forces in the crime and did not take effective measures to identify the perpetrators, acknowledging the violations specified in the complaint.

==== The murder of Natalia Estemirova ====
The next persecution of Memorial Human Rights Center employees for their professional work was the murder of human rights activist and journalist Natalia Estemirova, who was an employee at the Memorial office in Grozny. One week prior to her murder, Natalia Estemirova had published several materials about human rights violations taking place in the Chechen Republic.

On the morning of July 15, 2009, Natalia Estemirova was abducted near her home in Grozny. Later, her body was found in the neighboring Republic of Ingushetia with multiple gunshot wounds. Russian President Dmitry Medvedev instructed the head of the Investigative Committee Alexander Bastrykin and the Prosecutor General's Office to personally take control of the investigation into this murder case.

The official investigation and independent investigation conducted by Natalia Estemirova's colleagues at Memorial did not align with the version of events. Memorial employees said the crime was committed by Chechen law enforcement officers. Oleg Orlov, who was the chairman of the Council of the Human Rights Center at that time, directly blamed Ramzan Kadyrov for the death of Estemirova, justifying his position at the trial. The result of this public statement was a lawsuit filed against Orlov for libel by the President of the Chechen Republic, but the court did not find corpus delicti in the words of the human rights activist.

On July 3, 2010, in an interview on the Grozny television channel, Ramzan Kadyrov referred to the people involved in the activities of Memorial as "enemies of the people, enemies of the law, enemies of the state."

==== The case of Oyub Titiev ====
Persecution and harassment of Memorial employees continued in the North Caucasus region due to their human rights activities. On January 9, 2018, Oyub Titiev, who was the head of the Grozny office of the Memorial Human Rights Center, was detained by traffic police officers during a routine document check. As a result of searching Titiev and his vehicle, the police allegedly found a package containing marijuana. On charges of committing a crime under Part 2 of Article 228 of the Criminal Code of the Russian Federation ("Illegal acquisition and possession of narcotic drugs on a large scale"), Titiev was arrested and sentenced to 4 years in a penal colony.

On January 12, 2018, Titiev wrote a statement addressing Vladimir Putin, Alexander Bastrykin (head of the Investigative Committee), and Alexander Bortnikov (director of the FSB). In his statement, Titiev proclaimed that the criminal case against him was fabricated and he did not admit to any guilt. On January 17 of that same year, a fire broke out in the office of the Ingush branch of the Memorial Human Rights Center in Nazran, Ingushetia. No staff were injured in the fire, however, computers, furniture, and some documents belonging to the organization were burned and destroyed. According to Memorial's activists, the fire was a result of arson targeted against the human rights organization.

Oleg Orlov, who headed the "Hot Spots" program and was a member of the Council of the Memorial Human Rights Center, publicly linked the arson attack to the persecution of Oyub Titiev. Orlov made this assertion even though the work of Memorial's Ingush office was not related to operations in Chechnya.

The press service of the Ministry of Internal Affairs of Ingushetia reported that a criminal case had been initiated under Article 167 of the Criminal Code of the Russian Federation ("Intentional destruction or damage of property committed through arson").

On January 19, 2018, searches were conducted in the Memorial Human Rights Center's office in Grozny, Chechnya as part of the ongoing criminal case against Oyub Titiev.

==== Persecution of Sirazhutdin Datsiev ====
In March 2018, an attack was perpetrated against Sirazhutdin Datsiev, who was the head of the Makhachkala office of the Memorial Human Rights Center. Just a few days prior to the attack, an arson had been committed against a vehicle belonging to Memorial's office in Makhachkala, Dagestan. After the car arson, threatening phone calls had been received in the office promising to burn down the entire Memorial office in Dagestan along with the employees inside. After these threats, Sirazhutdin Datsiev was physically assaulted in March 2018.

==== Persecution of Bahrom Khamroev ====
Separate incidents of persecution were connected to the human rights work of Bahrom Khamroev, who focused on protecting the rights of Russian Muslims, refugees, and labor migrants from Central Asia. On December 7, 2010, in Moscow, during a special operation to detain persons considered to be Islamic extremists by the Russian government, Bahrom Khamroev was beaten by an unknown intelligence officer.

In June 2011, unknown assailants ambushed Bahrom Khamroev at the entrance of his own home, beating the human rights activist again just before he was scheduled to travel to the city of Murmansk. The purpose of Khamroev's trip to Murmansk was to meet with Yusup Kasymakhunov, a citizen of Uzbekistan who was the first person to be convicted of membership in the organization Hizb ut-Tahrir in Russia. Criminal cases were initiated after both incidents and attacks against Khamroev, however, the perpetrators have not yet been identified. The Human Rights Council under the President of the Russian Federation had promised to monitor the investigation into the second attack, but no suspects have been found.

On February 14, 2018, a new criminal case was opened against Bahrom Khamroev under Article 322.3 of the Criminal Code of the Russian Federation ("Fictitious registration of a foreign citizen at a residential address in the Russian Federation"), however, this case was later discontinued due to the expiration of the statute of limitations.

On February 24, 2022, Bahrom Khamroev was detained inside his own apartment by officers from the FSB security service, who entered the apartment with a key. On March 4, 2022, the Federal Financial Monitoring Service of the Russian Federation added Khamroev's name to the official list of individuals and organizations considered to be involved in extremist activities or terrorism. On May 23, 2023, the Second Western District Military Court of Moscow sentenced Bahrom Khamroev to 14 years of imprisonment. He was convicted on charges of justifying terrorism and organizing terrorist activities, under Part 2 of Article 205.2 and Part 1 of Article 205.5 of the Criminal Code of the Russian Federation. The Memorial Human Rights Center has added Bahrom Khamroev to its list of current political prisoners.

=== Status as a "Foreign Agent" ===
On July 21, 2014, the Ministry of Justice of the Russian Federation added the names of five Russian human rights organizations to the official list of NGOs designated as "foreign agents." Among the groups added to this list was the interregional association Memorial Human Rights Center.

On September 4, 2015, the Memorial Human Rights Center was fined 600,000 rubles (about US$10,000) by a Russian court for allegedly violating regulations regarding the operations of non-governmental organizations recognized as foreign agents, under Article 19.34 of the Administrative Code of the Russian Federation.

== Liquidation of the Memorial Human Rights Center ==
In November 2021, the authorities of the Russian Federation initiated two parallel processes to liquidate the Memorial Human Rights Center and the International Memorial: on November 8, 2021, the Moscow prosecutor's office filed a lawsuit for the liquidation of the Memorial Human Rights Center in the Moscow City Court, and the next day, on November 9, 2021, the Prosecutor General's Office of the Russian Federation filed a lawsuit for the liquidation of the International Memorial and its divisions. The official reason stated by the authorities was systematic violations of the foreign agent law, namely the absence of appropriate labeling on publications. Prosecutors' experts also identified "psychological and linguistic signs" of justifying terrorist organizations and "approval of extremism" in the activities of the Memorial Human Rights Center. The prosecutor stated that the Memorial Human Rights Center grossly and repeatedly violated the law, obstructed the protection of the health and well-being of citizens, and should be liquidated to protect their rights; he explained: "Creating a negative image of the state and the lack of labeling can cause depressive conditions among citizens."

On December 28, 2021, the Supreme Court of Russia, at the request of the Prosecutor General's Office, decided to liquidate the International Memorial. The resolution stated that the organization violates the law on "foreign agents," the "constitutional principle of equality of public associations," and thus encroaches on the foundations of constitutional order. The next day, the Moscow City Court satisfied a similar claim by the Prosecutor General's Office regarding the Memorial Human Rights Center.

On February 28, 2022, the Appeals Board of the Supreme Court considered the appeal of the International Memorial against the decision of the Supreme Court dated December 28, 2021, on the liquidation of the organization in response to the lawsuit of the Prosecutor General's Office. The appeal was denied, and the decision was upheld without changes. The court confirmed the decision to liquidate the Memorial Human Rights Center on April 5, 2022.

== Establishment of the Memorial Human Rights Center ==
After the court decision to liquidate "Memorial" came into effect, a team of supporters and former employees of the Human Rights Center formed a new organization - the Human Rights Protection Center "Memorial" (HRPC "Memorial" or Center "Memorial"). The HRPC was founded on June 14, 2022, as a non-governmental organization without state registration and legal status. Anastasia Garina serves as the executive director of the new organization. The co-chairs are Sergei Davidis and Oleg Orlov, and the board includes Natalia Sekretareva, Denis Shedov, Svetlana Gannushkina, Alexander Cherkasov, and Vladimir Malykhin. On April 11, 2024, Oleg Orlov and Svetlana Gannushkina were dismissed from their positions for their safety. Sergei Davidis became the sole chairman of the "Memorial".

=== Activities and Projects ===
The main activities of the Center include analytical work (monitoring the observance of rights and freedoms, researching mass human rights violations), legal assistance to those subjected to political persecution, educational activity, and support for the human rights movement.

The "Hotspots" direction covers the activities of the HRPC related to conflict zones. The Center monitors, collects, verifies, and compares information from various sources. Center lawyers in the North Caucasus provide legal assistance to citizens: offer consultations; help to file statements and complaints in courts, the Investigative Committee, the prosecutor's office, as well as the police and other authorities.

The network "Migration and Law" provides free legal assistance to forced migrants, refugees, and asylum seekers.

Currently, the center, in collaboration with the Coalition of Lawyers and Experts of Russian Human Rights Organizations for Conscious Objection to Military Service, provides legal assistance on mobilization issues.

=== Pressure on the Organization and Persecution of Employees ===
On March 21, 2023, the Investigative Committee in Moscow conducted searches of former employees of "Memorial" and their relatives for a case of "rehabilitation of Nazism" (part "b" of article 354.1 of the Criminal Code of the Russian Federation). In late 2021, the movement "Veterans of Russia" had already accused the organization of "falsifying facts of Nazi crimes." According to the statements of the accusers, individuals listed by "Memorial" as victims of political repression in the USSR actually collaborated with the Nazis.

On the same day, it became known that the Investigative Committee initiated a criminal case against the co-chair of the Human Rights Protection Center "Memorial," Oleg Orlov, on charges of repeated discredit of the Russian army (part 1 of article 280.3 of the Criminal Code of the Russian Federation). Earlier, Orlov had twice been held administratively accountable for anti-war pickets under the article on discrediting the army (20.3.3 of the Administrative Code). The resolution on prosecution indicated a post on Facebook published on November 14, 2022. It was a Russian translation of the article "They wanted fascism - they got it", published in the French newspaper "Mediapart". The article discusses the Russian invasion of Ukraine. During questioning as a suspect, Oleg Orlov stated in the protocol that he "published his personal opinion regarding events in the Russian Federation and the rest of the world," refusing to provide further testimony in accordance with Article 51 of the Constitution of the Russian Federation. Currently, Oleg Orlov is under travel restrictions, and court proceedings continue until the end of August 2023.

== Awards and Evaluation of Work ==
=== Nobel Peace Prize ===
On October 7, 2022, the Norwegian Nobel Committee awarded the Nobel Peace Prize for the defense of human rights in their countries to the Russian "Memorial," of which the Human Rights Center "Memorial" is a branch, the Ukrainian "Center for Civil Liberties", and the Belarusian human rights activist, chairman of the human rights center "Viasna," Ales Bialiatski.

The Nobel Committee in Oslo believes that the three laureates have demonstrated the significance of civil society, which they represent in their countries, for peace and democracy: "For many years, they have promoted the right to criticize the authorities and protect the fundamental rights of citizens. They have made outstanding efforts in documenting war crimes, human rights violations, and abuse of power."

The committee reminded that "Memorial" was founded in 1987 to preserve the memory of the victims of repression and crimes of the Soviet state, and among the founders of the organization were Nobel laureate Andrei Sakharov and human rights defender Svetlana Gannushkina. The press release also mentions "Memorial" employee Natalia Estemirova, who, according to the Nobel Committee's assessment, was killed for her human rights activities.

The award ceremony took place on December 10, 2022, in Oslo, and it was received on behalf of "Memorial" by Yan Rachinsky. At the ceremony, he delivered a speech titled "Peace, Memory, Freedom".

After receiving the prize, employees of "Memorial" published a joint official statement expressing gratitude to the Nobel Committee and pledging to continue their work under any circumstances.

The award was congratulated by various organizations, including the European Human Rights Advocacy Centre (EHRAC) and the Kennan Institute.
