= Brahim Saadoune =

Moroccan foreign volunteer (born 2000)

Brahim Saâdoune إبراهيم سعدون
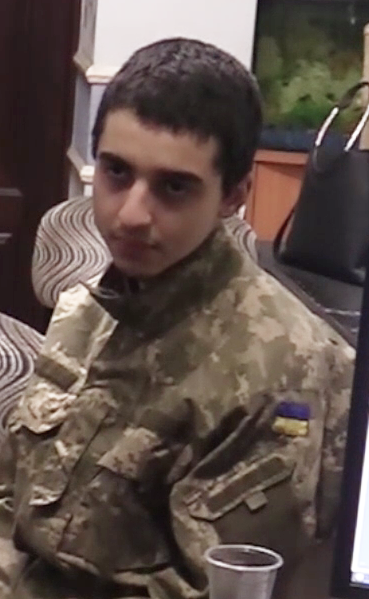
- Saâdoune being interrogated by the Investigative Committee of Russia in 2022
- Born: 2000 (age 25–26); Meknes, Morocco
- Military career
- Allegiance: Ukraine
- Service years: 2021–2022 (Ukraine)
- Unit: 36th Separate Marine Brigade
- Conflicts: Russo-Ukrainian War; War in Donbas; Russian invasion of Ukraine; Siege of Mariupol; Battle of Volnovakha (surrendered)

Brahim Saâdoune (Arabic: إبراهيم سعدون, romanized: Ibrāhīm Saʻdūn; born 2000) (Note: Berber languages: ⴱⵕⴰⵀⵉⵎ ⵙⵄⴷⵓⵏ, romanized: Bṛahim Sɛdun Ukrainian: Брахім Саадун, romanized: Brakhim Saadun Russian: Брагим Саадун, romanized: Bragim Saadun) is a Moroccan student who joined the Ukrainian Armed Forces as a fighter-volunteer. Saâdoune was captured during the Battle of Volnovakha and sentenced to death by the Supreme Court of the self-proclaimed Donetsk People's Republic (DPR) in what has been described as a "show trial".

On September 21, 2022, Saâdoune was released in a prisoner exchange deal mediated by Saudi Crown Prince Mohammed Bin Salman.

== Early life and education ==
Brahim Saâdoune was born in Meknes, Morocco. His father, Tahar, was a veteran of the Royal Moroccan Gendarmerie from Safi. Tahar had served as head of investigations in Agadir, where Brahim finished primary school before moving to Casablanca. He obtained his scientific Baccalaureate in 2018.

Saâdoune moved to Ukraine in 2019 and studied Russian at the Poltava University of Economics and Trade. He had decided to study in Ukraine due to the quality of education and cost.

He later studied aeronautical engineering at the Kyiv Polytechnic Institute's Institute of Aerospace Technologies. Saâdoune was allegedly given Ukrainian nationality in 2020 after undergoing a year of military training as a requirement to access aerospace technology.

At the start of the Russian invasion of Ukraine, Morocco launched a major repatriation campaign, it was initially planned for Saâdoune to have been repatriated to Morocco through Poland.

== Military career ==
In November 2021, Saâdoune signed a three-year contract with the Armed Forces of Ukraine. He had joined the army to "fight injustice", as well as to gain military experience. Shaun Pinner had helped Saâdoune join the armed forces over Facebook.

In the months before the invasion, Saâdoune was deployed to Mariupol, serving in the 36th Separate Marine Brigade. In the army, he served as a driver and a translator, as he knew Russian, Ukrainian, English, French, Arabic, and Tamazight.

After the invasion started, he fought alongside Ukrainian forces in the besieged city of Mariupol.

== Capture and trial ==
Saâdoune surrendered and was later captured by Russian forces on March 12, 2022, during the Battle of Volnovakha. An interview with Saâdoune was broadcast on Channel One Russia, where he was portrayed as a mercenary. During the interview, he claimed that he was very scared during his capture.

After he was captured, he was taken to Donetsk and was tried along with two British fighters, Aiden Aslin and Shaun Pinner. Saâdoune and Pinner plead not guilty to "mercenary" charges, but admitted involvement in fighting "intending to overturn constitutional order".

The Supreme Court of the Donetsk People's Republic sentenced the trio to death for mercenarism, trying to overturn constitutional order, and undergoing training to carry out terrorist activities. Their trial has been described as a "show trial".

The day after his sentencing, Saâdoune told Russia Today that he "didn't know what was going to happen", and that he "was ready for anything". Saâdoune's lawyer, Yelena Vesnina, said that she did not expect the sentence, and called it "very harsh".

While there is a moratorium on the death penalty in Russia, it does not apply in the self-proclaimed Donetsk People's Republic. A moratorium on the death penalty for "foreign mercenaries" was later adopted by the self-proclaimed parliament of the Donetsk Republic.

== Reactions ==
On June 12, Denis Pushilin, head of the Donetsk People's Republic, said that no mercy should be shown to the fighters, saying that "they came to Ukraine to kill civilians for money, that's why I don't see any conditions for any mitigation or modification of the sentence". Natalia Nikonorva, Minister of Foreign Affairs of the DPR chastised Britain and Morocco and said saying they "do not care at all about the fate of their citizens", reiterating that the two countries have not contacted them. The Office of the United Nations High Commissioner for Human Rights has said that the death sentence being carried out in their case could be considered as a war crime.

Following the trial, Russian TV anchor and propagandist Vladimir Solovyov discussed different ways to kill the trio on his show, Evening with Vladimir Solovyov on Russia-1, with his panel debating whether to shoot, hang, dismember or release them for ransom.

Ukrainian friends of Saâdoune called on the UK to help him get released. According to his girlfriend, Brahim's sentence may be a result of trying to "increase his price", however, she does not know what the Russians want in return for him. She last spoke to him on March 27.

On 17 June, the European Court of Human Rights issued an emergency ruling against Russia and Ukraine following a complaint by Saâdoune. The court ordered Russia and Ukraine to ensure the death penalty was not executed. The court stressed that Russia was still obliged to follow the court's rules. The court also said it was considering the issue of jurisdiction, as Brahim was being held by the internationally unrecognized DPR. Earlier in June, the Russian State Duma passed a law to end the court's jurisdiction in Russia, but it has not yet been signed into law.

=== Reactions in Morocco ===
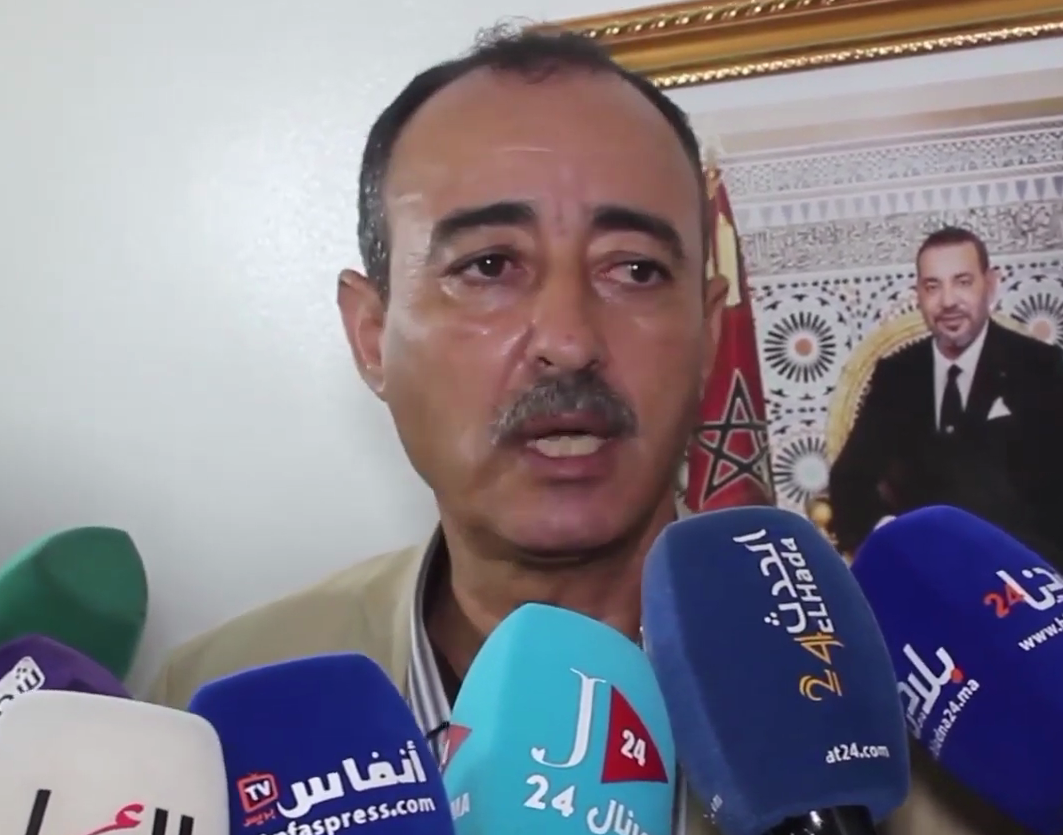
Tahar Saâdoune speaking at a press conference in Rabat

The Moroccan Embassy in Kyiv released a brief statement saying that Saâdoune "enlisted in the Ukrainian army of his own free will", and is "currently imprisoned by an entity which is recognized neither by the United Nations nor by Morocco". The statement claimed that Saâdoune had "Ukrainian citizenship", and he was "captured wearing the uniform of the State Army of Ukraine".

The Moroccan-Russian Friendship Association and the Moroccan Committee for Peace and Solidarity appealed directly to Russia to intervene on humanitarian grounds. The Moroccan Coalition Against the Death Penalty sent a letter to the Head of Government and Ministry of Foreign Affairs urging the government to intervene.

Saâdoune's father, Tahar, thanked Russian forces for "preserving the life of their son" at a press conference in Rabat. During the press conference, he affirmed that Brahim was "a Ukrainian citizen", and denied claims that Brahim was a mercenary. He urged "the Moroccan government, a country that moved a mountain to save Rayan a few months ago, to intervene".

Morocco's National Human Rights Council contacted the Russian Commissioner for Human Rights to "intervene as much as possible to protect the [Saâdoune's] rights".

The Moroccan Association for Human Rights provided lawyers to Saâdoune and was planning to observe his appeal, the association elaborated that Saâdoune was a resident and didn't have Ukrainian citizenship. The Moroccan Center for Human Rights criticized the country's diplomatic silence on the trial, calling for the country to intervene and send lawyers to help Brahim.

Morocco had adopted a policy of neutrality for the Russian invasion of Ukraine and was absent from UN General Assembly votes regarding the invasion, though Morocco said its decision to not participate in said votes "cannot be the subject of any interpretation in relation to its position of principle concerning the situation between the Russian Federation and Ukraine".

On 15 June, Morocco's House of Councillors requested that foreign minister Nasser Bourita attend a government accountability session regarding Saâdoune, but Bourita's office refused.

Saâdoune's sister said local press in Morocco and people on social media had celebrated her brother's sentence, as pro-Russian views are more common in the Middle East and Africa than in Europe.

== Release ==
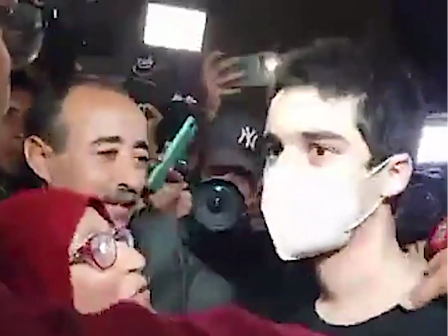
Saâdoune (right) reuniting with his family after his release

On September 21, 2022, Saâdoune was released with 9 other detainees held by the Donetsk People's Republic in a prisoner exchange between Ukraine and Russia brokered by Saudi Arabia. Saâdoune was in the process of appealing his case, his family had not been previously informed of the prisoner exchange. Oligarch Roman Abramovich claimed that he played a "key role" in the prisoner exchange deal.

Saâdoune's father, Tahar, thanked the Saudi authorities "who contributed to the release of Brahim, after King Mohammed VI personally took charge of the case".

Saâdoune arrived in Casablanca and reunited with his family on September 24, 2022, following a medical checkup in Riyadh. Saâdoune said that he had "suffered from imprisonment but will recover and get back to studying".

== See also ==
- Russian information war against Ukraine
- Aiden Aslin
- Shaun Pinner
