= Shaun Pinner =

British foreign volunteer (born 1974)

- Born: 1974 (age 51–52); Bedfordshire, United Kingdom
- Military career
- Allegiance: United Kingdom; Ukraine
- Branch: British Army; Ukrainian Navy; Ukrainian Marine Corps
- Unit: 36th Separate Marine Brigade
- Conflicts: UN Mission in Bosnia and Herzegovina; War against the Islamic State; Russo-Ukrainian War; Russian invasion of Ukraine; Siege of Mariupol (POW)

Shaun Pinner is a former soldier of the British Army who joined the Ukrainian Armed Forces as a contracted fighter in 2018 and fought during the Russian invasion of Ukraine. During the siege of Mariupol, he was captured and sentenced to death in a show trial by the Supreme Court of the self-proclaimed statelet Donetsk People's Republic (DPR), but was freed in September 2022 in a prisoner exchange. In December 2022 he was awarded the state ‘Order of Courage, 3rd Degree’ in a decree by Ukrainian President Volodymyr Zelenskyy for “selfless acts in the defence and sovereignty of Ukraine”.

== Biography ==
Being a Ukrainian Marine, Pinner was legally a protected person under the Geneva Conventions as a prisoner of war. However, Russian state media has portrayed him as a mercenary. Another British citizen, Aiden Aslin and the Moroccan Saadoun Brahim, received identical verdicts in the same trial. British Foreign Secretary Liz Truss tweeted that: "The judgement against them is an egregious breach of the Geneva convention." The defence attorney did not even ask for an explanation as to why the existing arguments against mercenary status were not been taken into consideration, simply saying instead that "the guilt of my client has been fully established".

I'm married to a Ukrainian. I have got every right to be here (...) It’s taken me a long time to integrate here, so the guys know I’m not a war tourist or war junkie.

— Shaun Pinner in an interview with Sky News while on the frontline.

Pinner was described by his family as a well-respected soldier within the British Army, where he served in the Royal Anglian Regiment. He spent nine years in this regiment with a spotless record. He also volunteered to fight against ISIS in the Middle East and served with the United Nations mission in Bosnia and Herzegovina.

After retirement, Pinner was employed for some time as a waste manager in Watford, Hertfordshire, working for about 16 hours a day. Pinner moved to Ukraine with his Ukrainian wife before joining the nation's armed forces in 2018. Being an experienced soldier, Pinner was made a squad commander in Ukraine.

At the time of his capture, he was due to complete his three-year military contract later in 2022 and was hoping for a humanitarian role. Pinner considers Ukraine to be his adopted country over the last four years, calling Mariupol his home city.

On 29 June 2022, Pinner appealed against his death sentence, requesting for it to be changed to life imprisonment. The appeal was to be reviewed within a two-week period; if rejected, Pinner would, according to his lawyer, request to be pardoned by the head of the DPR. A day later the European Court of Human Rights told Russia to ensure that the death penalty was not carried out on Pinner and fellow prisoner Aiden Aslin. Russia, however, said it would no longer comply with the ECHR's prescriptions, although Russia only formally withdrew from the court in September 2022.

Pinner was released in a prisoner exchange in September 2022.

== See also ==
- Russian information war against Ukraine
- Aiden Aslin
- Brahim Saaudun
