= Bilohorivka =

Bilohorivka (Ukrainian: Білогорівка) may refer to several settlements in Ukraine

- Bilohorivka, Donetsk Oblast, a village
- Bilohorivka, a former village in Donetsk Oblast that was disestablished in 2008
- Bilohorivka, Luhansk Oblast, an urban-type settlement
- Bilohorivka, Rivne Oblast, a village
