= BTR-50 =

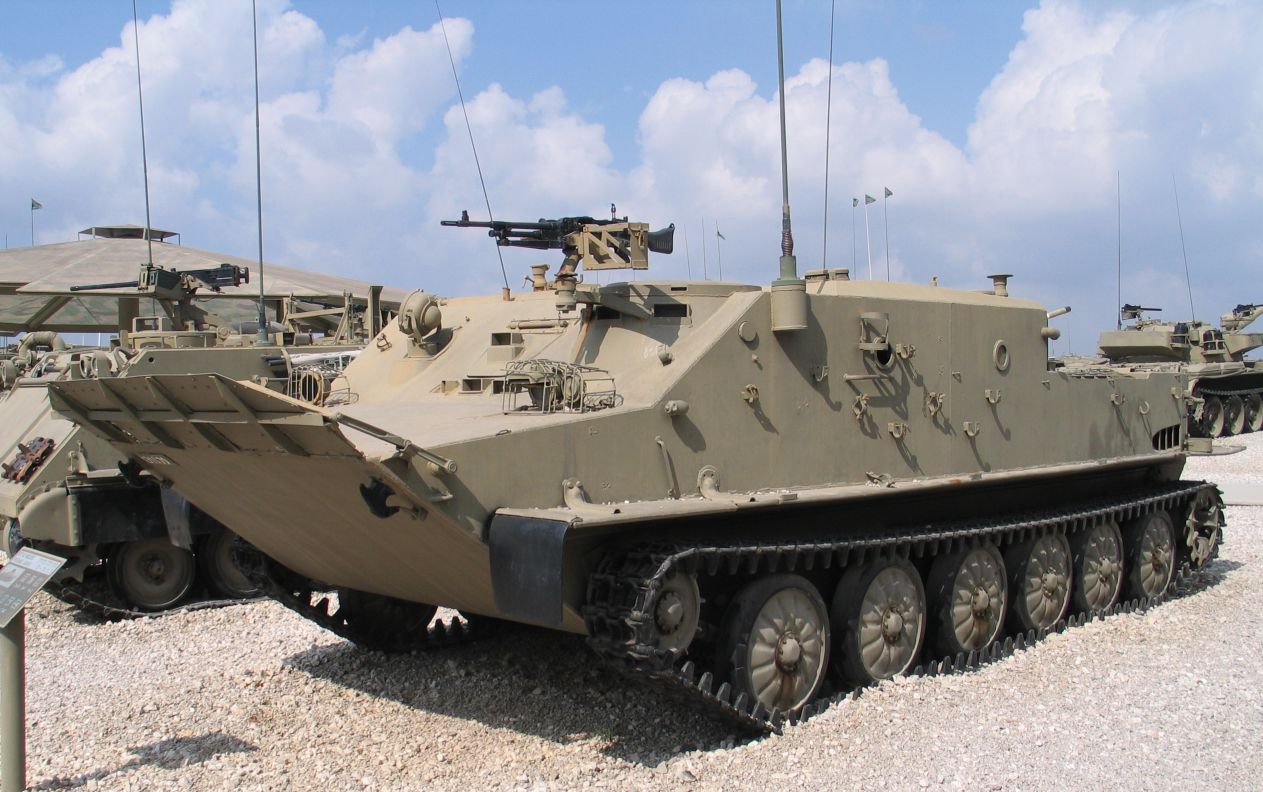
- An Israeli-modified ex-Syrian or ex-Egyptian late-production model BTR-50PK APC at the Yad La-Shiryon Museum, Israel, 2005.
- Type: Amphibious tracked armoured personnel carrier
- Place of origin: Soviet Union

Service history
- In service: 1954–present
- Used by: See Operators
- Wars: Indonesia–Malaysia confrontation; Six-Day War; Vietnam War; War of Attrition; Yom Kippur War; Indonesian Invasion of East Timor; Angolan Civil War; Lebanese Civil War; Ogaden War; Soviet–Afghan War; Iran–Iraq War; Somali Civil War; Yugoslav Wars; 2003–2004 Indonesian offensive in Aceh; Syrian civil war; Russo-Ukrainian war

Production history
- Designed: 1952
- Manufacturer: Volgograd Tractor Plant
- Produced: 1954–1970 (also produced in Czechoslovakia until 1972; maybe still produced by some foreign companies)
- Variants: See Variants

Specifications
- Mass: 14.5 tonnes
- Length: 7,080 mm
- Width: 3,140 mm
- Height: 2,030 mm
- Crew: 2 + 20 passengers
- Armor: Homogeneous welded steel 13 mm front 10 mm sides 10 mm top 7 mm rear
- Main armament: None; BTR-50P & BTR-50PK: 7.62 mm SGMB medium machine gun (1,250 rounds); BTR-50PA: 14.5 mm KPV heavy machine gun
- Engine: The "V-6" 6-cylinder 4-stroke in line water-cooled diesel 240 hp (179 kW) at 1,800 rpm
- Power/weight: 16.6 hp/t
- Suspension: torsion bar
- Ground clearance: 370 mm
- Fuel capacity: 400 l
- Operational range: 400 km
- Maximum speed: 44 km/h (road); 11 km/h (water)

The BTR-50 (BTR stands for Bronetransporter (Russian: БТР, Бронетранспортер), literally "armoured transporter") is a Soviet tracked amphibious armoured personnel carrier (APC) based on the PT-76 light tank chassis. The BTR-50 was developed in 1952 and entered service with the Soviet Army in 1954. It ceased production in the USSR in 1970, but production continued in Czechoslovakia until 1972 and there is suggestion that it still produced by some foreign companies. It has the ability to transport up to 20 fully equipped infantrymen, and can be armed with nothing, a 7.62 mm SGMB medium machine gun, or a 14.5 mm KPV heavy machine gun. It saw notable service in the Six-Day War, the Yom Kippur War, and most recently in the Russo-Ukrainian War.

The BTR-50 shares similarities with two other APCs developed independently, the OT-62 TOPAS and the Type 77. While the OT-62 is an improved copy of the BTR-50 developed jointly by Czechoslovakia and Poland, the Type 77 is based on the Type 63 amphibious light tank developed by the People's Republic of China (PRC), which was developed from the PT-76.

== Description ==
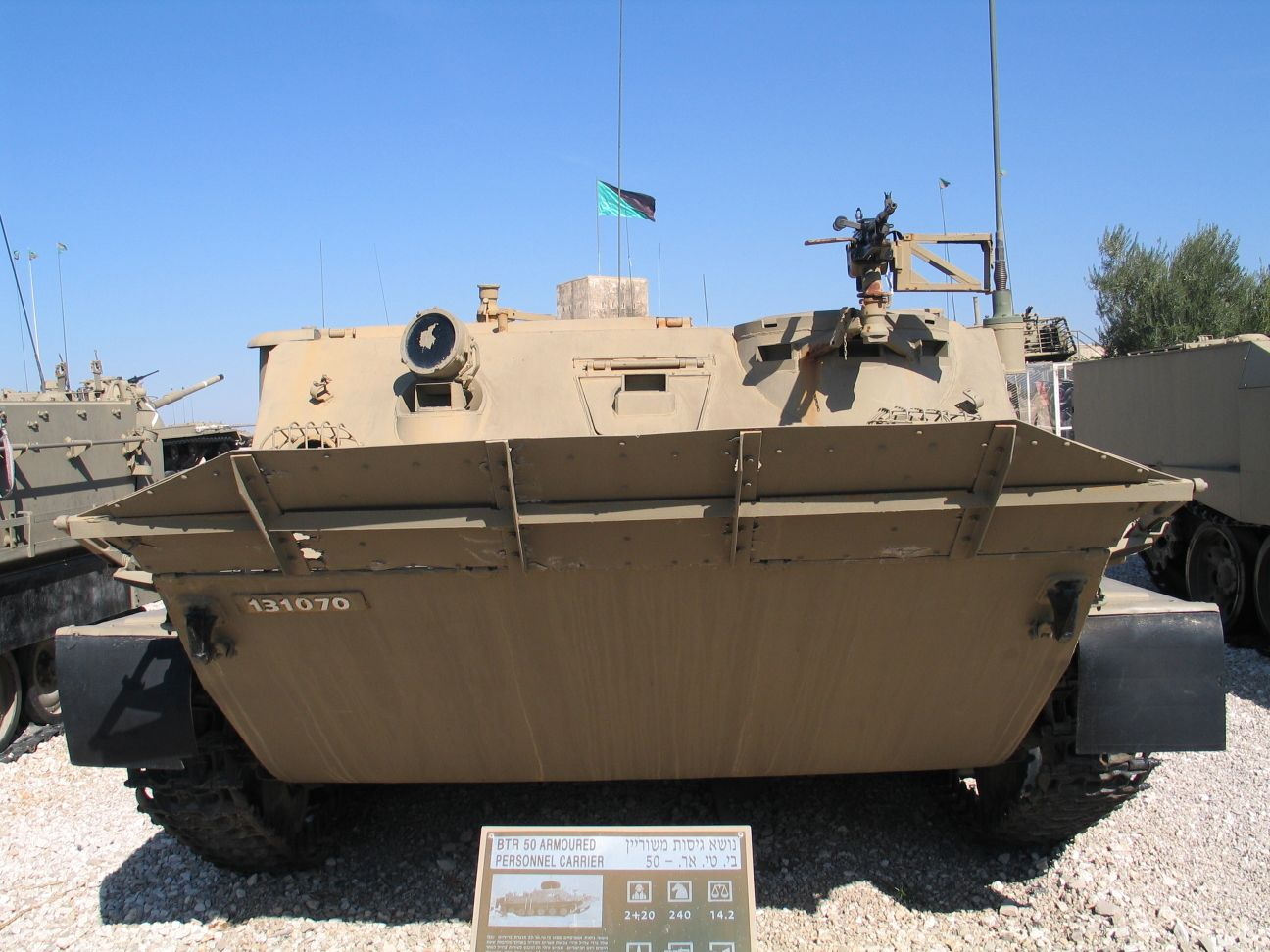
Front of the Israeli-modified ex-Syrian or ex-Egyptian late-production model BTR-50PK APC at the Yad la-Shiryon Museum, Israel. 2005. Note the elevated trim vane and IR searchlight.

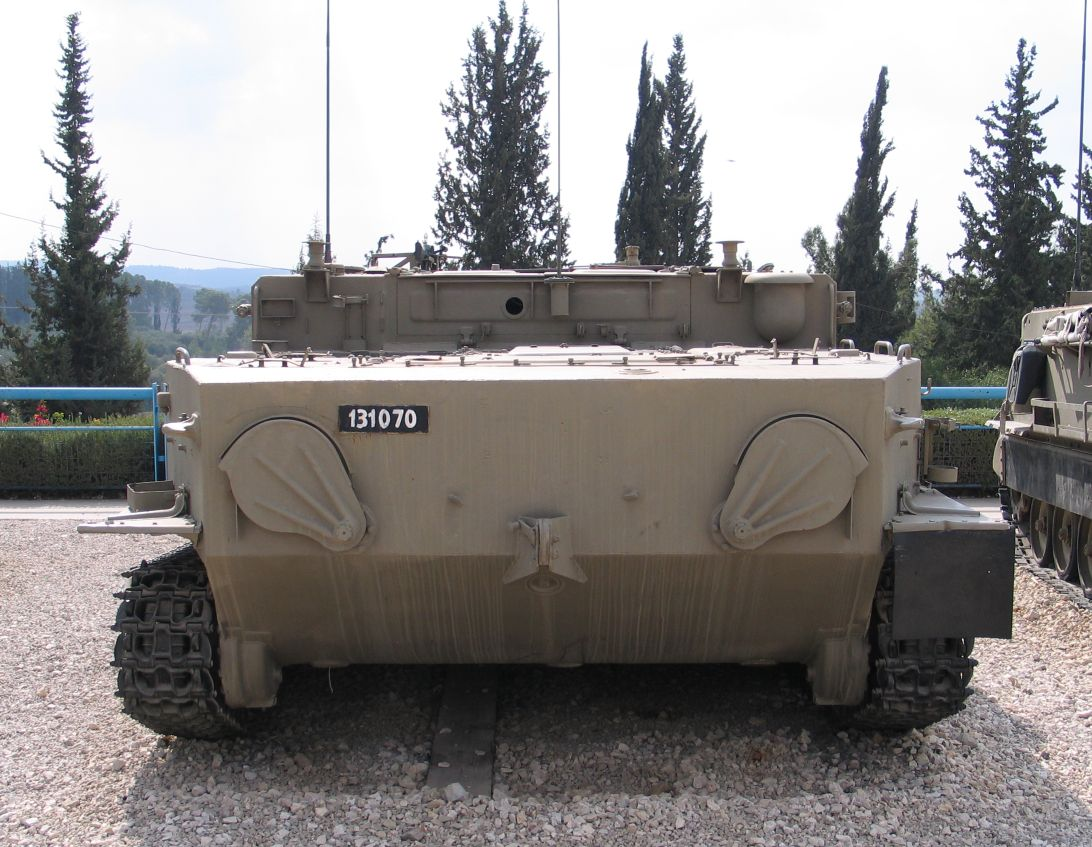
Rear view of the same APC. The two water-jets have their lids closed.

Like the PT-76, the BTR-50 has a flat, boat-shaped hull. Unlike the PT-76, it has a new superstructure added to the front of the vehicle. The hull of the BTR-50 is made of all-welded steel with the crew compartment in the front, the troop compartment in the center and the engine compartment at the rear. It has the ability to transport up to 20 fully equipped infantrymen, who sit on benches that run across the full width of the troop compartment. They embark and disembark the APC by climbing over the sides of the hull.

The driver sits in the center of the front of the hull and has three vision blocks and periscopes located at the top of the sloping glacis plate. During night operations, the center periscope can be swapped for the TVN-28 night vision device, which gives the driver clear vision up to 60 meters. The driver has a small hatch that opens upwards—while it cannot be used to leave the vehicle, it can be opened in relatively safe areas for extra vision. In combat, the hatch is closed and the driver can use a vision block.

There is an emergency hatch under the driver's seat. The commander, who sits on the left side of the vehicle at the front, has three vision blocks and periscopes in a projecting bay. On top of this bay is a cupola that opens forward and can be locked vertically. It has a vision block facing forward. The vehicle can operate in temperatures from −40 °C to +40 °C.

The torsion bar suspension consists of six evenly spaced large rubber-tired road wheels with a drive sprocket at the rear and an idler at the front. The road wheels are hollow to assist its amphibious capabilities. These wheels increase the APC's buoyancy by 30%. There are no track-return rollers. The first and last road wheels have a hydraulic shock absorber, the steel tracks have a single pin and 96 links each when new. There is a small, thin, horizontal skirt over each track.

The BTR-50 is powered by a V-6 6-cylinder 4-stroke in line water-cooled diesel 240 hp (179 kW) engine at 1800 rpm. This has a road speed of 44 km/h with a cruising range of 400 km. The vehicle can negotiate 30° side slopes, ascend 60° gradients, cross 1.1 m high vertical obstacles and 2.8 m wide trenches. The engine has a cooling system and a pre-heater, intended for ignition when the air temperature is −20 °C or below. The APC has a five gear manual shaft-type transmission system similar to that in the T-34/85 medium tank.

The gearbox has four forward and one reverse gear. The vehicle has a side clutch that enables it to make turns, mechanical transmission and a bandbrake. The vehicle has three fuel tanks, two on the right, at the front of the engine compartment and one at the rear. The total fuel capacity is 400 liters. The vehicle has four mounts for external fuel tanks located on the rear of the hull. The two on the hull corners are for a flat external tanks, whereas the two in the center are for a drum-type of tank.

The BTR-50 is amphibious thanks to its flat, boat-shaped hull, which is hermetically sealed and ensures minimal resistance when the APC is afloat. It can swim after switching on the two electric bilge pumps. Erecting the trim vane improves the stability and displacement of the vehicle in the water, and prevents water from flooding over the bow of the APC. Swapping the driver's periscope for a swimming periscope enables the driver to see over the trim vane. There is a manual bilge pump for emergency use.

In the water, it is propelled by two hydrojets, one on each side of the hull. The inlets are under the hull, the outlets are at the rear. There are additional assistant water-jet inlets on both sides of the hull over the last road wheels. The rear outlets have lids that can be fully or partially closed, redirecting the water stream to the forward-directed outlets at the sides of the hull, thus enabling the vehicle to turn. This system was designed by N. Konowalow. It is the same system as the one used in the PT-76. The vehicle's low freeboard of 15 to 20 cm and lack of a snorkel means that it can only swim in the calmest waters.

Its armor is composed of homogeneous, cold rolled, welded steel—it is very thin by modern standards, 13 mm at the front, 10 mm on the sides and top and 7 mm at the rear. While its maximum armor could protect it against small arms fire and small artillery shell fragments, it cannot protect it against .50-caliber machine gun bullets and larger shell fragments. Although its front armor might protect it against 7.62 mm small arms fire, that same fire can sometimes penetrate the sides. The vehicle is equipped with an IR driving light and an IR searchlight. It lags behind other Soviet armored fighting vehicles as it has no fire protection systems and, with the exception of the BTR-50PK variant, it has no nuclear, biological or chemical (NBC) protection systems, which significantly reduces its effectiveness.

== Service history ==
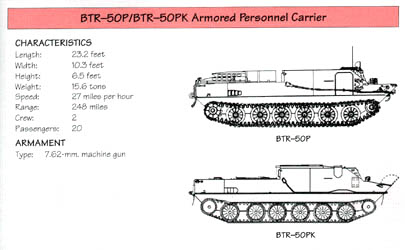
A US Army recognition poster.

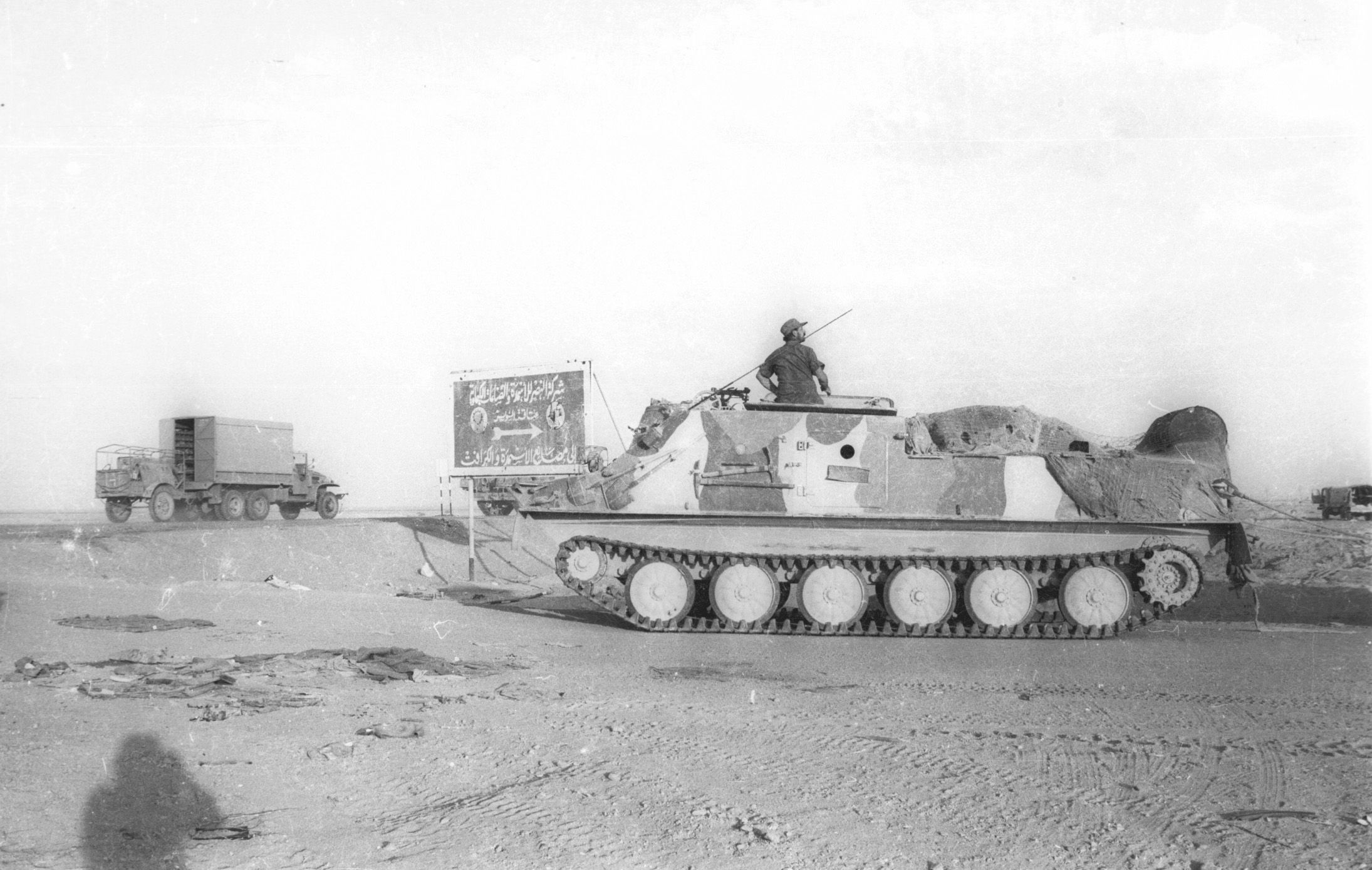
Captured Egyptian BTR-50 pressed into Israeli service during the Six-Day War in 1967.

The BTR-50 was developed in 1952 and entered service with the Soviet Army in 1954. It was first shown in public in November 1957. It served in the motorized rifle regiments of tank divisions and mechanized brigades in the Soviet and East German armies. A typical mechanized brigade consisted of three battalions, each of which had 30 APCs and a command vehicle. They were replaced in front line service by the BMP-1 IFV. Command vehicle variants were employed by many Warsaw Pact armies.

BTR-50s were used by Egypt and Syria during the Six-Day War (1967), a number of which were captured by Israel. Some vehicles were then re-used by the Israeli Army. Both sides used BTR-50s during the War of Attrition (1968–70). During Operation "Raviv" (September 8–9, 1969), an amphibious raid across the Suez Canal, three T-54 tanks and six BTR-50s were used to wreak havoc behind Egyptian lines.

BTR-50s were again employed by Egypt, Syria and Israel during the Yom Kippur War (1973). During this conflict, BTR-50s, along with T-54s and T-55s, were used by the IDF during the fighting in and around the city of Suez. Israel captured additional BTR-50s from the Egyptians and Syrians. Some of Israel's BTR-50s were later transferred to the South Lebanon Army.

=== Russo-Ukraine War ===
In February 2023 it was reported that Russia had reactivated some BTR-50s from storage and deployed them during the Russian invasion of Ukraine. In October 2023, the first example of a Russian BTR-50 being deployed in frontline combat in Ukraine appeared, with at least one BTR-50 being visually confirmed as destroyed by Ukrainian anti-tank mines northeast of Avdiivka in Donetsk Oblast during a large-scale Russian offensive against the city.

As of 9 May 2025, Russia is visually confirmed to have suffered 11 BTR-50 losses (six BTR-50s and five BTR-50s with BPU-1 turret).

== Variants ==
=== Former USSR ===
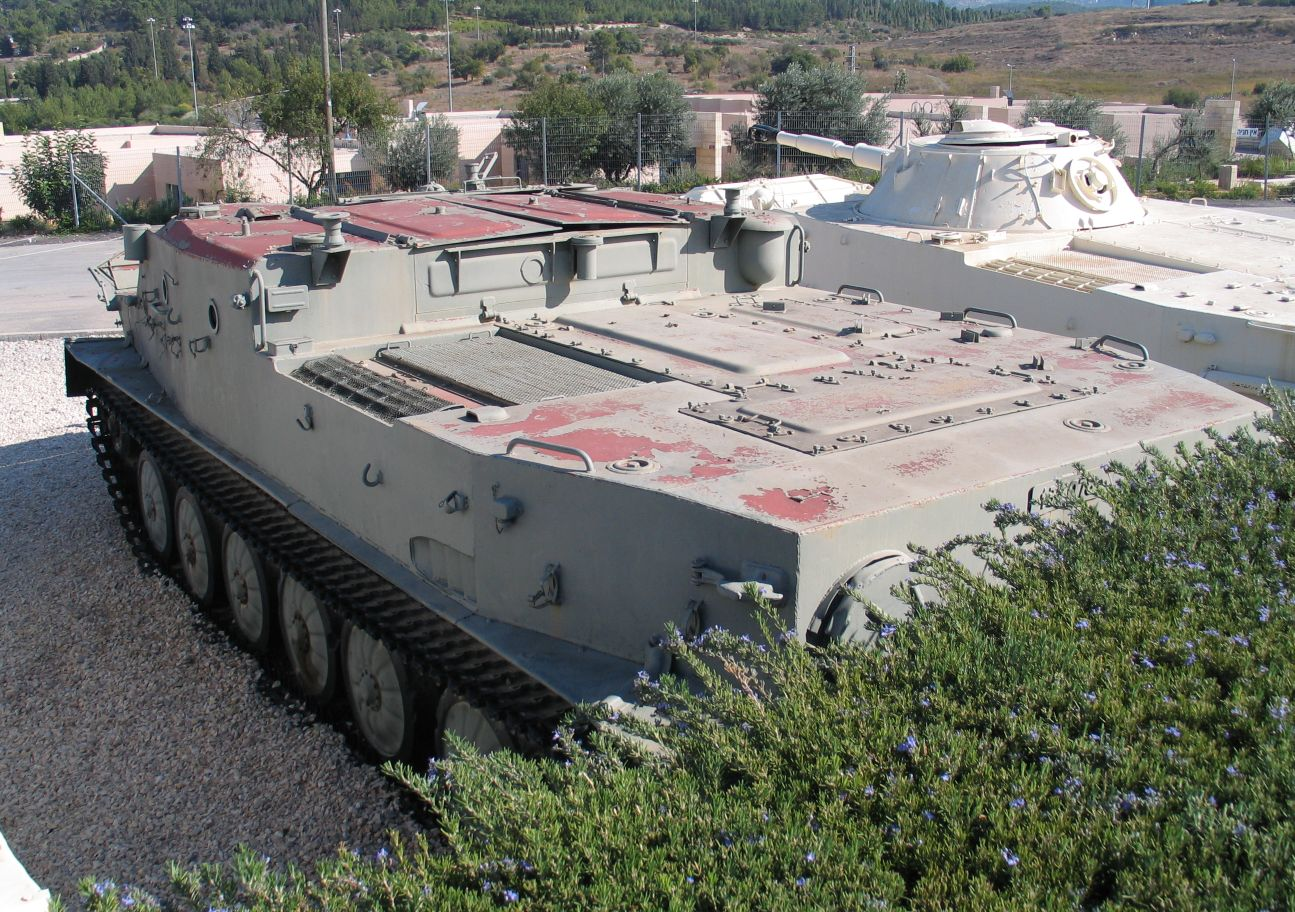
An ex-Syrian or ex-Egyptian late-production model BTR-50PK APC in Yad la-Shiryon Museum, Israel. 2005.

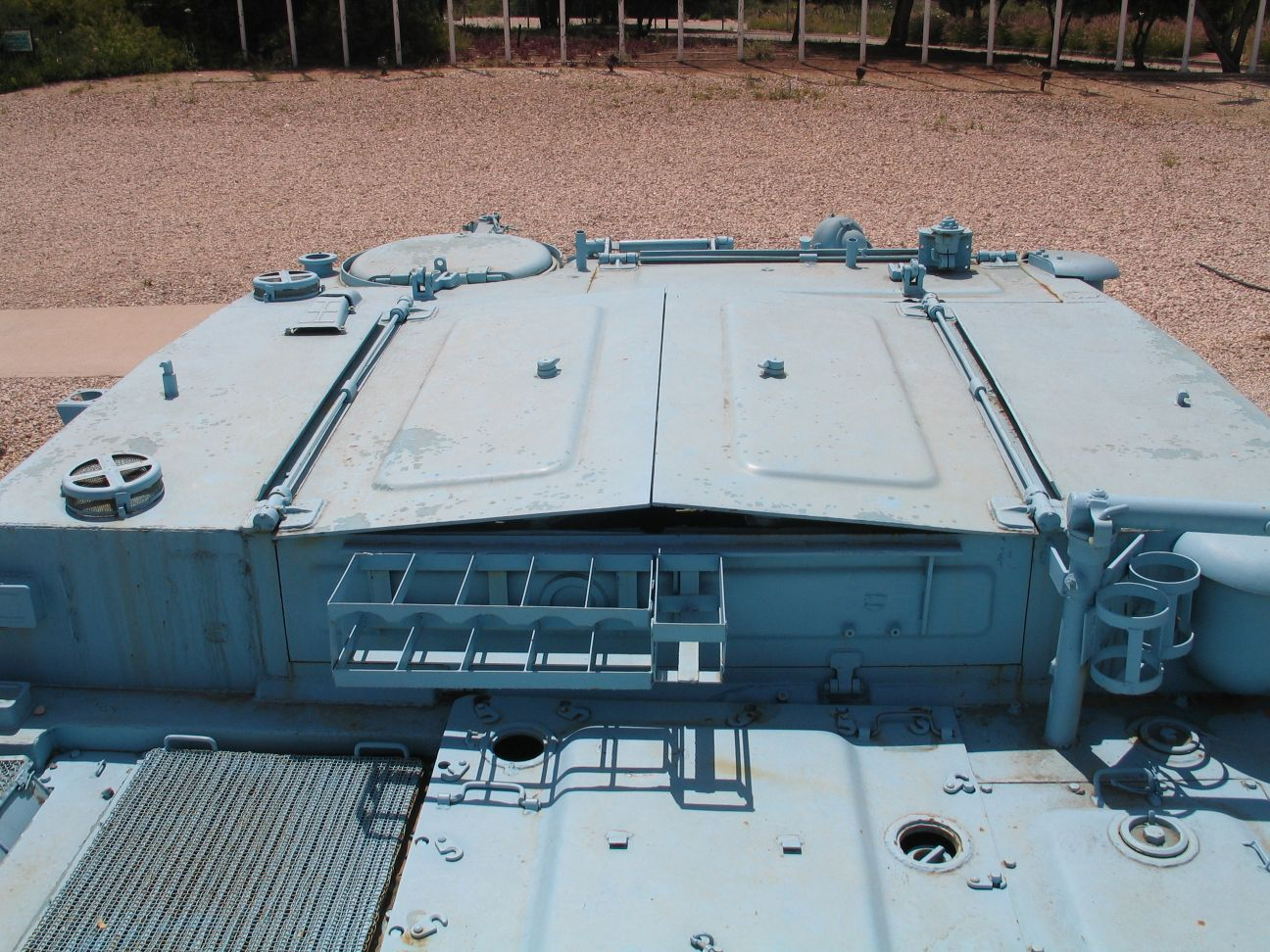
Close-up of the top hatches.

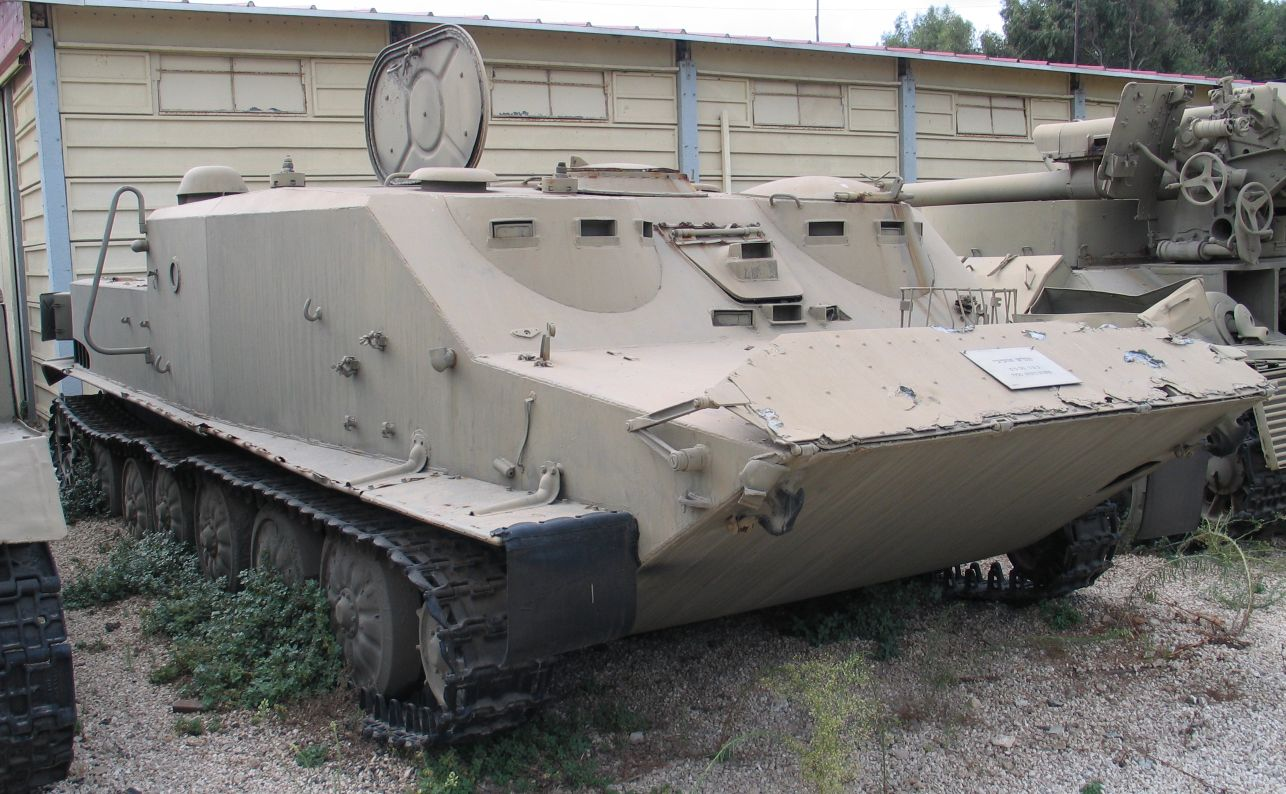
An ex-Syrian or ex-Egyptian BTR-50PU command vehicle. Note the second bay and the oval hatches.

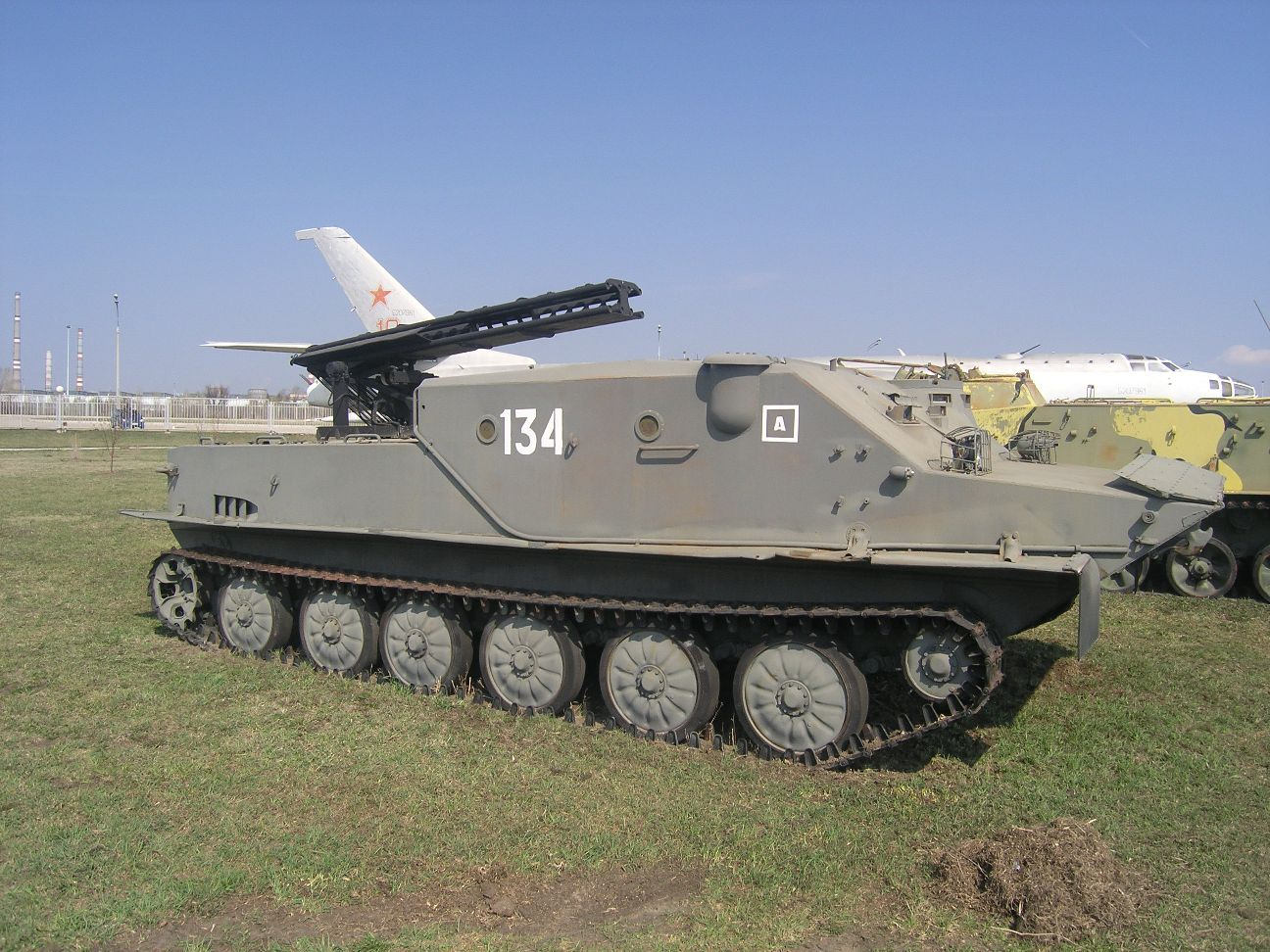
UR-67

- BTR-50P (Ob'yekt 750) (1952) – The first production version with an open troop compartment. The vehicle had no integral armament, but it did have a pintle mount for a 7.62 mm SGMB medium machine gun. Early production BTR-50P models had folding ramps at the rear of the hull to enable either a 57 mm ZiS-2, a 76.2 mm ZiS-3 or an 85 mm D-44 anti-tank gun to be loaded and fired on the engine decks. The weapon could also be fired when the vehicle was afloat, but only when the water-jets were in operation. This system had one great flaw, the muzzle of the gun was usually over the open personnel compartment and as such submitted any occupants to a considerable amount of concussion and fumes. These ramps were absent in later production models.
  - BTR-50P – Converted into an artillery portee vehicle. This version carried its gun in the crew compartment, thus placing the muzzle of the gun outside the vehicle. While seen mostly carrying the 57 mm ZIS-2 anti-tank gun, there were also two other variants of this vehicle that carried anti-aircraft (AA) weapons.
    - ZTPU-2 (zenitnaya samokhodnaya ustanovka) – BTR-50P converted into a self-propelled anti-aircraft gun (SPAAG), armed with twin ZPU-2 14.5 mm heavy machine guns (1,280 rounds). Prototype.
    - ZTPU-4 (zenitnaya samokhodnaya ustanovka) – A BTR-50P converted into a SPAAG armed with quadruple ZPU-4 14.5 mm heavy machine guns (2,560 rounds). Prototype.
  - BTR-50P – Converted into a Forward Air Control vehicle with a second superstructure on top of the first.
  - BTR-50P – Converted into an NBC reconnaissance vehicle with a second superstructure on top of the first.
  - BTR-50P – Has a longer nose section.
  - BTR-50PA (Ob'yekt 750M) (1954) – BTR-50P armed with a 14.5 mm KPV heavy machine gun on a pintle mount at the front of the troop compartment.
    - BTR-50PA with its heavy machine gun mounted on the commander's cupola.
  - BTR-50PK (Ob'yekt 750K) (K stands for krisha – "roof") (1958) – A BTR-50P fitted with an armored roof, the troops embarking and disembarking the vehicle via two rectangular roof hatches that open to either side. There is also another rectangular roof hatch at the front of the roof. It was armed with a pintle-mounted 7.62 mm SGMB medium machine gun. This variant has an NBC protection system. The vehicle had two ventilators, one at the front of the troop compartment on the right and one at the rear, also on the right. It is likely that these vehicles were mostly upgraded from BTR-50Ps. Another production run of the BTR-50PK had a single firing port on each side of the superstructure. They were rarely seen in use as APCs as the majority consisted of specialized variants, such as command vehicles, before being replaced by another batch with two firing ports on each side of the superstructure.
    - BTR-50PK – Fitted with a locater light in the center of the engine deck. This variant was issued to Soviet marine and assault river crossing units.
    - BTR-50PK – Converted into a training vehicle with four cupolas on top of the roof.
    - BTR-50PK – Has a longer nose section. Used by marine units.
    - UR-67 (ustanovka razminirovaniya) – Mine-clearing vehicle equipped with a UR-67 rocket launcher system which has three launchers firing UZP-67 or UZR-3 tubes filled with explosives. The UZP-67 or UZR-3 are carried in a fabric tube container carried inside the hull. The mine clearing procedure is composed of driving the vehicle to the edge of the minefield and aligning it before the rockets are fired from its elevated launcher at the rear of the vehicle. The rocket tows the line charge, which is secured to the launcher vehicle, across the minefield. The line charge is then positioned by the vehicle crew and detonated to clear any mines in its vicinity. The cleared lane is usually 60 m to 150 m long and 2 m to 5 m wide. The vehicle has a crew of three. Some of the vehicles were based on the BTR-50PK, others were based on the PT-76. They were known in the west as the MTK and MTK-1. Only a small number remain in service, most have been replaced by the UR-77.
    - BTR-50PN (1958) – Early command vehicle with three radios (including an R-113) and three whip antennas. Only a small number were built.
    - BTR-50PU (mashina upravleniya) (1959) – Unarmed command vehicle. It carries a crew of 10 and has an armored roof with oval hatches and four whip antennas. Most of the BTR-50PUs have two projecting bays on the front of the vehicle (the respective NATO codes are: BTR-50PU(1) and BTR-50PU(2)). The two bays are the same shape, unlike in the OT-62 TOPAS, which is otherwise very similar in appearance. The vehicle has ten seats, of which four are for the commander and his staff, four are for the radio operators and two are for the vehicle's commander and driver. The staff compartment has a collapsible table, a second small table for the commander, two hammocks and three ladders. An emergency escape hatch is provided in the floor of the vehicle and the vehicle has thermal insulation. Specialized equipment consists of KN-2 and KP-2 navigation devices; an AB-1-P/30 1 kW generator (located on the rear engine deck); R-105, R-105U and R-113 VHF radios; a R-112 HF transceiver, a R-311 HF receiver; a collapsible 11 m mast antenna for the R-105U; a light 10 m telescopic mast for the R-112; a R-403BM relay-set; R-120 intercom and a P-193A 10-line field telephone switchboard with six TAI-43 field telephones and four cable reels, each with 600 m of two-wire cable. The navigation system includes a gyro course indicator and course plotter (the former indicates the vehicle's course, the latter plots it on a rectangular co-ordinate system). Some vehicles have different numbers of stowage boxes in different arrangements on the rear engine decks. Some vehicles have a second generator.
      - BTR-50PU with a longer nose section.
      - BTR-50PU-2 – An improved version with more modern radio equipment, most probably the R-123 and the R-130M. It is externally similar to the BTR-50PU, but has a portable generator located immediately behind the troop compartment.
      - BTR-50PUM – A modernised variant, it is equipped with a large AMU telescopic antenna mast and R-123 (3×), R-130, R-326, R-405D and T-218 radios. This model has a square antenna stowage box on the right front side of the hull.
      - BTR-50PUM-1 (1972) – latest model with a crew of up to 8 and fitted with the same radios as mounted in the R-145BM (BTR-60): R-111 (2×), R-123MT, R-124 and R-130M.
    - MTP-1 (mashina tekhnicheskoj pomoshchi) – A technical support vehicle with a raised troop compartment and a light crane.
    - Polyesye – A civilian version of the MTP-1.

=== Belarus ===
- BTR-50PKM – An upgraded BTR-50PK with a UTD-20 engine developing 300 hp (224 kW), new steering, brake systems and driver's optronics.
- MTP-300T – Technical support vehicle, fitted with a manipulator, a universal welding machine, towing and lifting gear, a workbench, spare parts etc.

=== Bulgaria ===
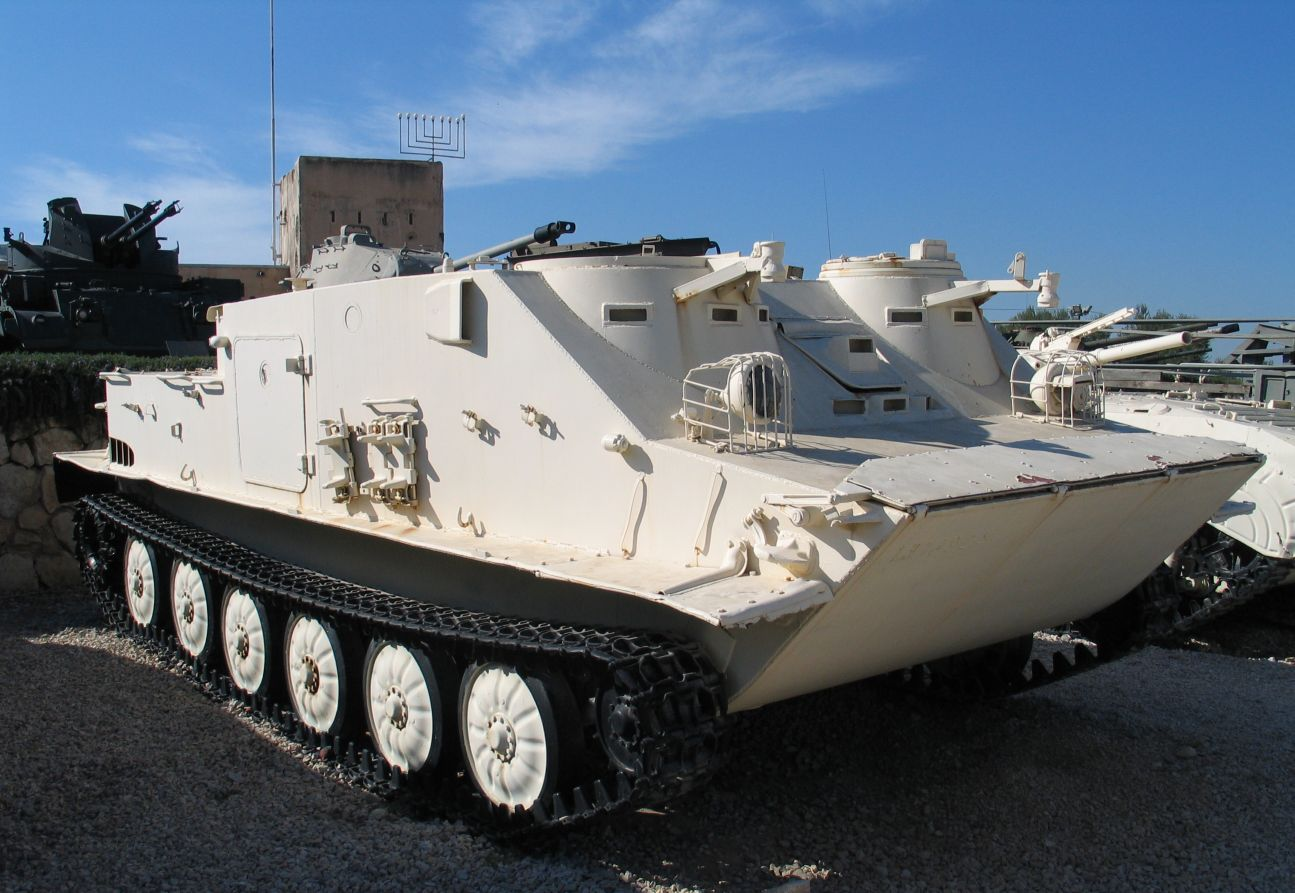
An OT-62 TOPAS APC in Yad la-Shiryon Museum, Israel. 2005. Note the second bay and the side hatch.

- R-54 - A planned Infantry Fighting Vehicle variant, with a 23mm cannon. Complement for a 3-man crew and 9 passengers
- R-82 – An improved BTR-50PU command vehicle with different radios and a collapsible AZI frame antenna.

=== Czechoslovakia ===
- OT-62 TOPAS (OT-62 stands for Obrněný Transportér vzor 62 – "Armored Personnel Carrier model 62") ("TOPAS" stands for Transportér Obrněný PÁSový – "Tracked Armored Personnel Carrier") – A series of BTR-50 variants developed jointly by Poland and Czechoslovakia. They are similar to the BTR-50PK but have hatches in the hull sides, a more powerful PV-6 engine giving 300 hp (224 kW) and two projecting bays at the front of the superstructure instead of one like similar looking BTR-50PU (however the bays are different from one another in terms of shape).

=== East Germany ===
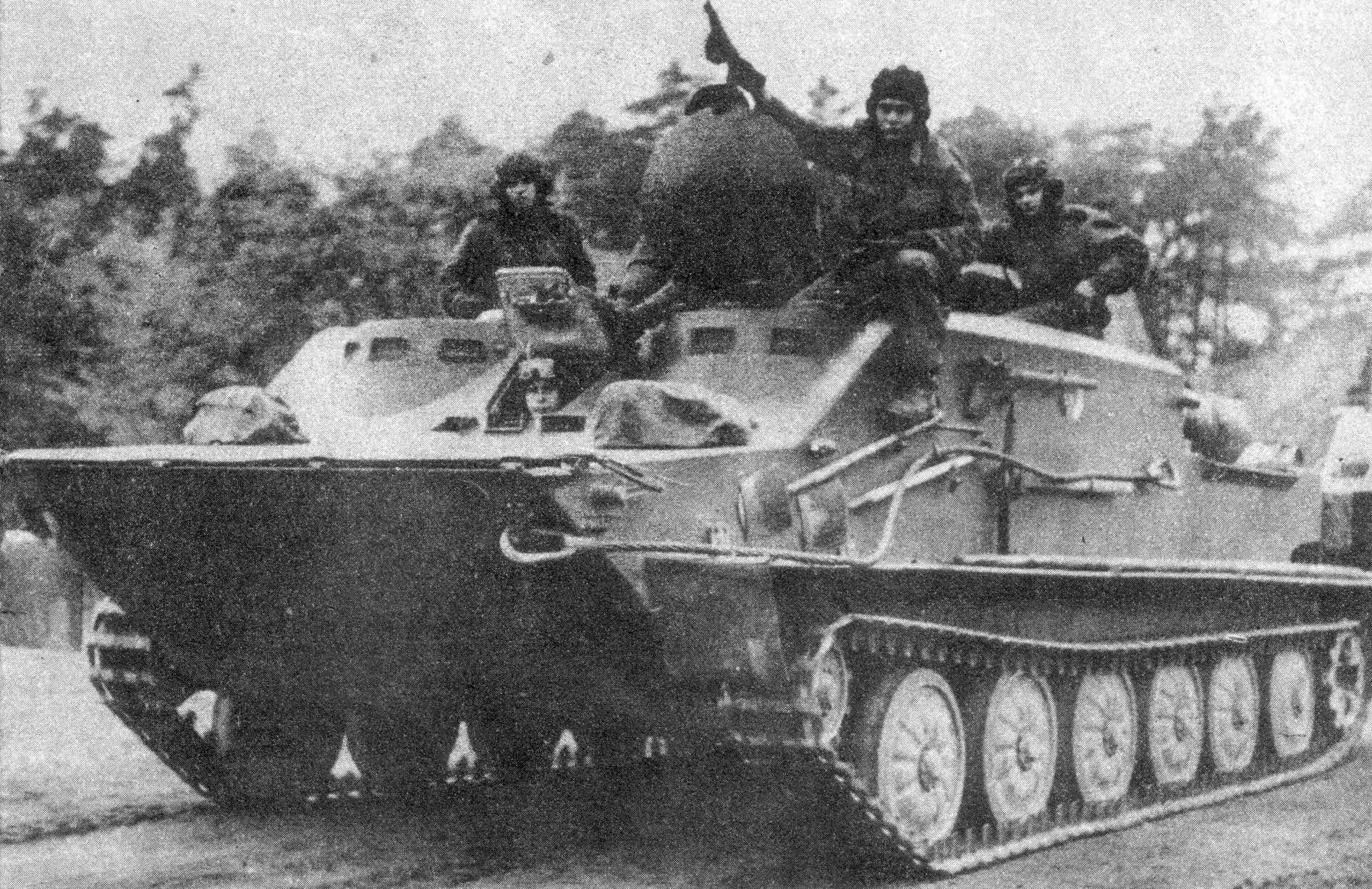
East German SPW-50PU command vehicle.

- SPW 50P (Schützenpanzerwagen) – Nationale Volksarmee (NVA) designation for the Soviet-produced BTR-50P.
  - SPW 50PK – NVA designation for the Soviet-produced BTR-50PK. The NVA had a number of locally modified SPWs in service
    - SPW 50PK(Akl) (Aufklärung) – Version for reconnaissance units.
    - SPW 50PK(D)
    - SPW 50PK(B) (Bergefahrzeug) – A BTR-50PK converted into a recovery vehicle. It weighed 14 tonnes and had a crew of two (commander and driver), with seats for four auxiliary personnel. During rescue operations the vehicle can accommodate up to eight personnel. The SPW-50PK(B) is fitted with R-123M and R-124 radios, a rear-mounted coupling for towing, a tow hook, two extra towing cables, two special quick-release shackles, standard shackles and snap hooks, a searchlight, two lifebelts, life jackets, a set of tools, fire extinguishers and four fenders.
    - SPW 50PK(BBS) (Batteriebeobachtungsstelle) – Observation vehicle for air defense units.
    - SPW 50PK(KM) (Kernmine) – SPW 50PK, equipped with a tool set for combat engineers PGS-5 (Pioniergerätesatz) to locate and retrieve mines.
    - SPW 50PK(LA) (Luftabwehr) – Command vehicle for air defense units.
    - SPW 50PK(MRF) (Minenräumfahrzeug), also known as Minenräumfahrzeug 50PK (SPW) – A mine-clearing vehicle, equipped with two containers for mine-clearing charges WLWD of Polish design. The containers were loaded onto the roof of the troop compartment via two ramps, welded on the engine deck.
    - SPW 50PK(Pi) – Command vehicle for combat engineer (Pioniere) units.
    - SPW 50PK(S) – Command and staff vehicle.
    - SPW 50PK(UF) (Unterwasserfahrt) – SPW 50PK, equipped with a tool set for combat engineers PGS-4 (Pioniergerätesatz) to prepare river crossings.
    - SPW 50PU – NVA designation for the BTR-50PU.
      - SPW 50PU(A) – Locally modified version for the commanders of the divisional artillery.

=== Egypt ===
- BTR-50PK – Fitted with a glassed cabin on top of the standard superstructure.

=== Finland ===
- BTR-50YVI (yhtymän viestijärjestelmä) – BTR-50PK converted into a command and staff vehicle. It is fitted with the YVI-2 digital communication system, a telescopic mast, the NSVT 12.7 mm heavy machine gun and additional armor. Fielded in 1994.
- BTR-50PUM – Upgraded BTR-50PU fitted with the equipment of the R-145BM (BTR-60 variant) and smoke grenade launchers, one NSVT 12.7 mm heavy machine gun and additional armor.
  - BTR-50PUM1 – Modernized PUM with western radio sets.

=== Indonesia ===
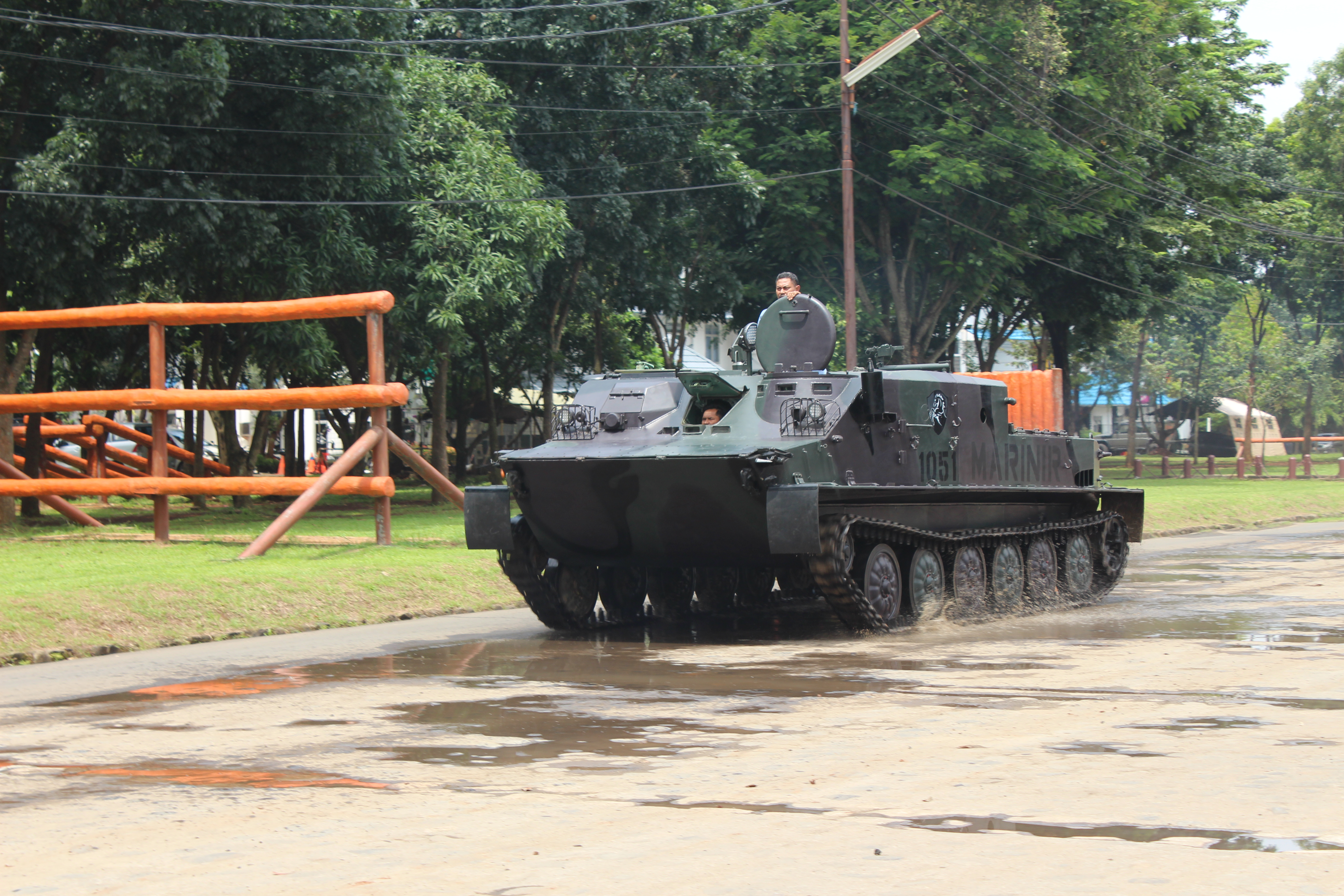
Indonesian Marine Corps BTR-50P(M)

- BTR-50PM (Palawa Modification) – Indonesian Marine Corps BTR-50s modernized with BTR-2000 upgrade package from Nimda, Israel in 1990s. Fitted with AN/VRC-64 and PRC-33 radios instead of the 10-RT, new brake system, FN MAG machine gun instead of the PKT and a Detroit Diesel 6V92T engine instead of the original V-6V.
- BTR-50P(M) – Indonesian Marine Corps BTR-50s overhauled, reconditioned, and fitted with new fire extinguisher system by PT Lumindo Artha Sejati in 2019–2021.
- PAL-AFV (Armoured Floating Vehicle) – Upgraded version, developed by the PT PAL Indonesia in cooperation with Pindad. This vehicle has a new nose section, a raised rear hull section and powered by a 300 hp engine. Combat weight is 14,700 kg, with transport capacity is 3 + 14 troops. A model of the PAL-AFV was displayed at Indo Defence 2008.

=== Iraq ===
- BTR-50P – Converted into a self-propelled anti-aircraft gun (SPAAG) and armed with a Soviet 23 mm ZU-23-2 anti-aircraft autocanon. Fitted with additional armor around the engine decks to maintain its amphibious ability.
- BTR-50PK converted into a SPAAG armed with Czechoslovak twin 30 mm M-53/59 autocannons in an open-tub mount.

=== Israel ===
- BTR-50PK fitted with a pintle-mounted 7.62 mm FN MAG machine gun in front of the commander's cupola.
- BTR-50PK armed with three pintle-mounted US M1919A4 .30 cal medium machine guns (one on the front of the superstructure and one on each side), another was pintle-mounted in front of the commander's cupola.

=== Poland ===
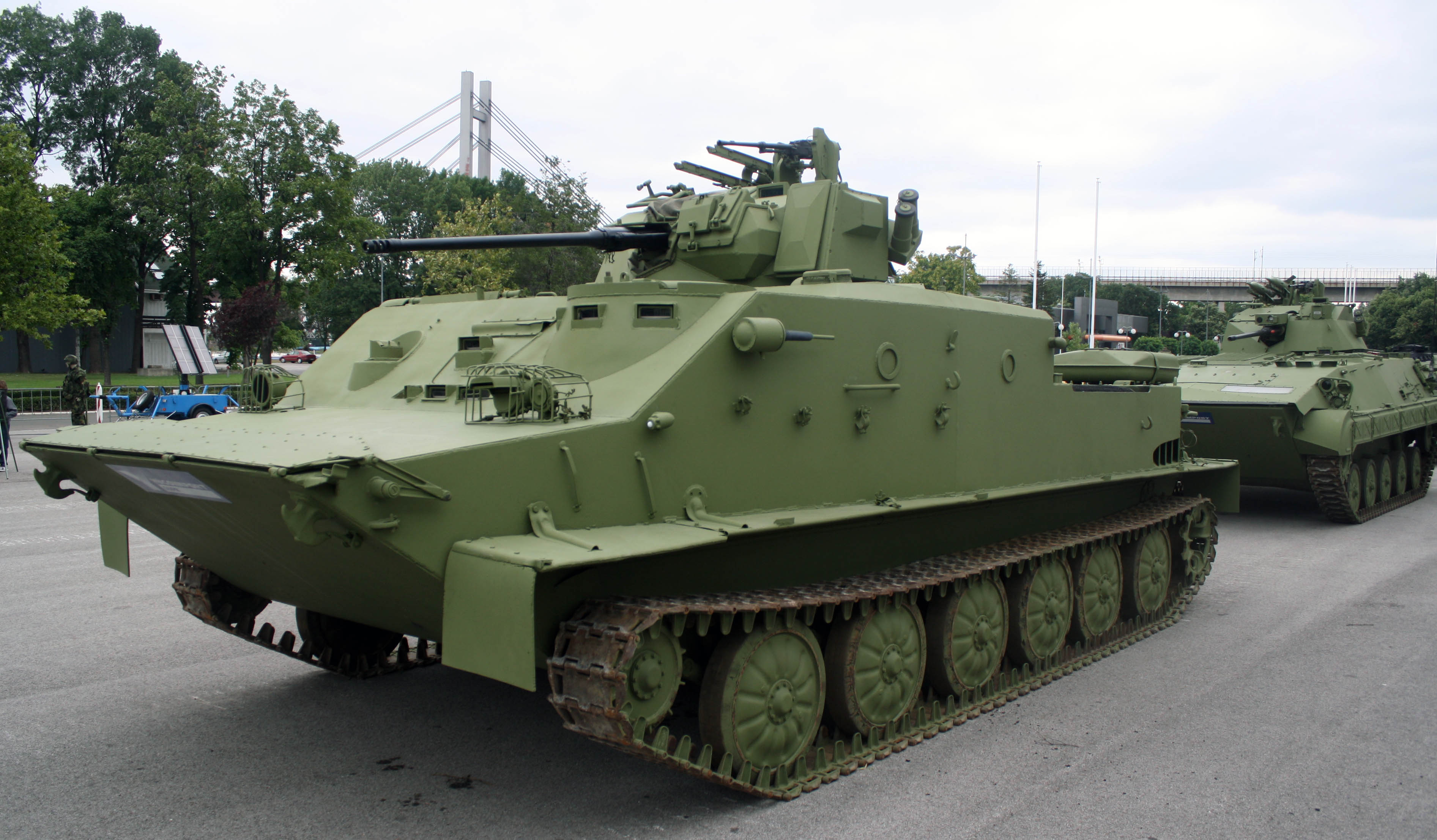
A BTR-50S on display at "Partner 2011" military fair.

- OT-62 TOPAS (OT-62 stands for Obrněný Transportér vzor 62 – "Armored Personnel Carrier model 62") ("TOPAS" stands for Transportér Obrněný PÁSový – "Tracked Armored Personnel Carrier") – A series of BTR-50 variants developed jointly by Poland and Czechoslovakia. They are similar to the BTR-50PK but have hatches in the hull sides, a more powerful PV-6 engine giving 300 hp (224 kW) and two projecting bays in front of the superstructure instead of one like similar looking BTR-50PU (however the bays are different from one another in terms of shape).

=== Serbia ===
- BTR-50S (2005) – An upgrade package for the BTR-50PK offered by the Serbian defense firm Yugoimport SPDR. The package adds a turret (from the Yugoslav M-80 APC). It is armed with one 30 mm cannon, one 7.62 mm Zastava M86 machine gun, two ATGM launchers capable of firing 9M14 Malyutka anti-tank guided missiles (ATGM)s and four smoke grenade launchers.

=== South Lebanon ===
- BTR-50PK – Converted into an improvised medevac vehicle with a cut down front and a hatch in the front.

=== Ukraine ===
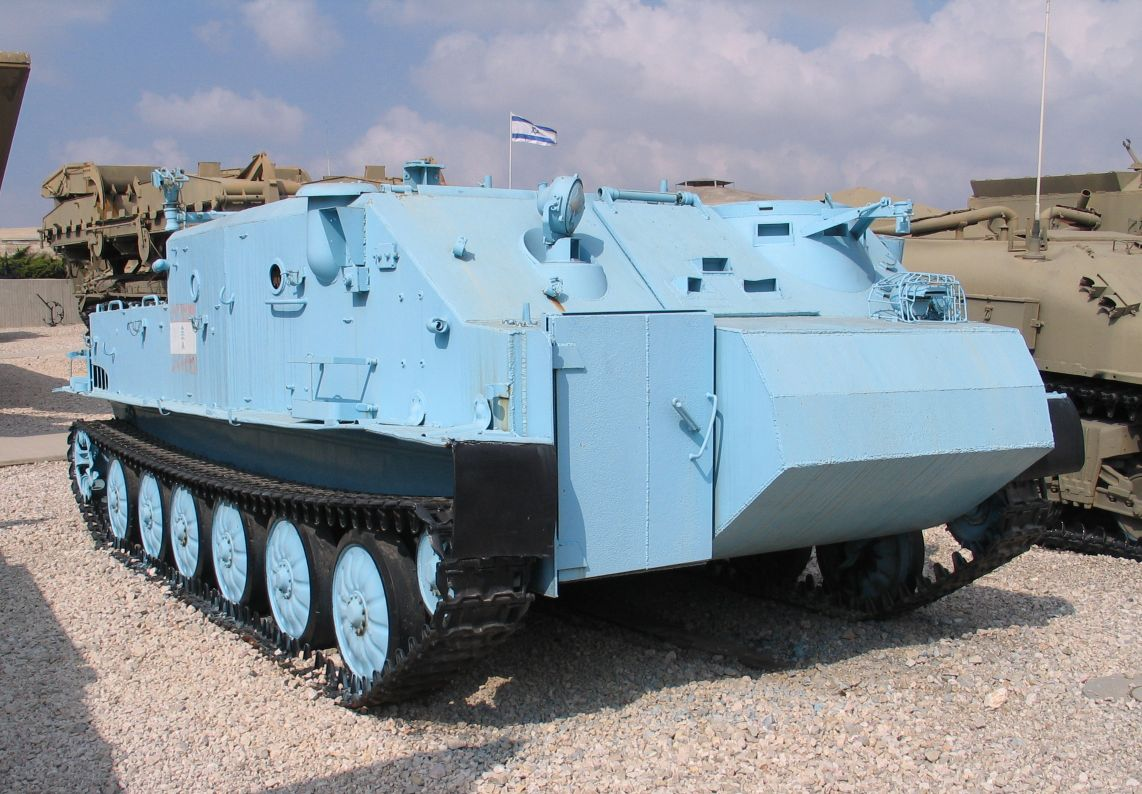
Improvised medevac vehicle used by the South Lebanon Army in the Yad la-Shiryon Museum, Israel. 2005.

- BTR-50PK based ARV.
- BTR-50M – BTR-50PK upgrade built by Morozow. It features improvements in firepower and mobility, both of which can be carried out independently.

Improvements in firepower are achieved by adding one of two new fighting modules (turrets), both of which are armed with one 30 mm ZTM1 or 2A72 autocannon, one 7.62 mm KT or PKT coaxial machine gun, one 9K113 Konkurs (NATO: AT-5 Spandrel) ATGM and one 30 mm AGS-17 automatic grenade launcher. Both main guns are stabilized in the vertical axis (the second variant has a two-axis stabilization) and have electro-mechanical aiming drives. Both have a maximum effective range of 4,000 m and can be elevated or depressed between −10° and +60° or −4° and +60°. The vehicle carries 150 rounds (the second variant carries 350 rounds).

Both machine guns have a maximum effective range of 1,600 m. The vehicle carries 2,000 rounds in four batches of 500, (the second variant carries the same quantity of ammunition but in two batches of 1,000 rounds). The ATGM system has a minimum range of 100 m and maximum range of 4,000 m with four missiles. The automatic grenade launcher has a maximum range of 1,700 m.

The vehicle uses a number of instruments with its armament. These include the TKN-5 day/night sight with a laser rangefinder, the PZU-7 day sight for firing at air and ground targets and the 9Sh119M1 anti-tank guided missile system sight.

Mobility is improved by replacing the Soviet-built engine with the UTD-20 6-cylinder 4-stroke V-type water-cooled diesel engine built in Ukraine, replacing the gearbox with a planetary system and installing hydraulic volumetric transmission. The suspension has also been improved by adding three return rollers. The vehicle has a new system of air intakes and exhausts on the left hand side of the front of the engine deck. This upgrade can also be applied to BTR-50PU vehicles. This vehicle has a greater combat capability, lower fuel consumption and a higher power-to-weight ratio. The vehicle can operate in temperatures between −40 °C and +55 °C and has an increased road speed of 75 km/h.

As a result of all these changes the vehicle is now higher—3.085 m (the second variant is 2.895 m) and heavier—16.6 tonnes (the second variant weighs 16.8 tonnes).

There are also additional improvements which can be carried out at customer's request. Those include adding kevlar-type spall liner to improve vehicle's protection, navigation system for improving tactical mobility and air conditioning system for improving crew comfort and allowing easier operation in hot climate.

== Operators ==
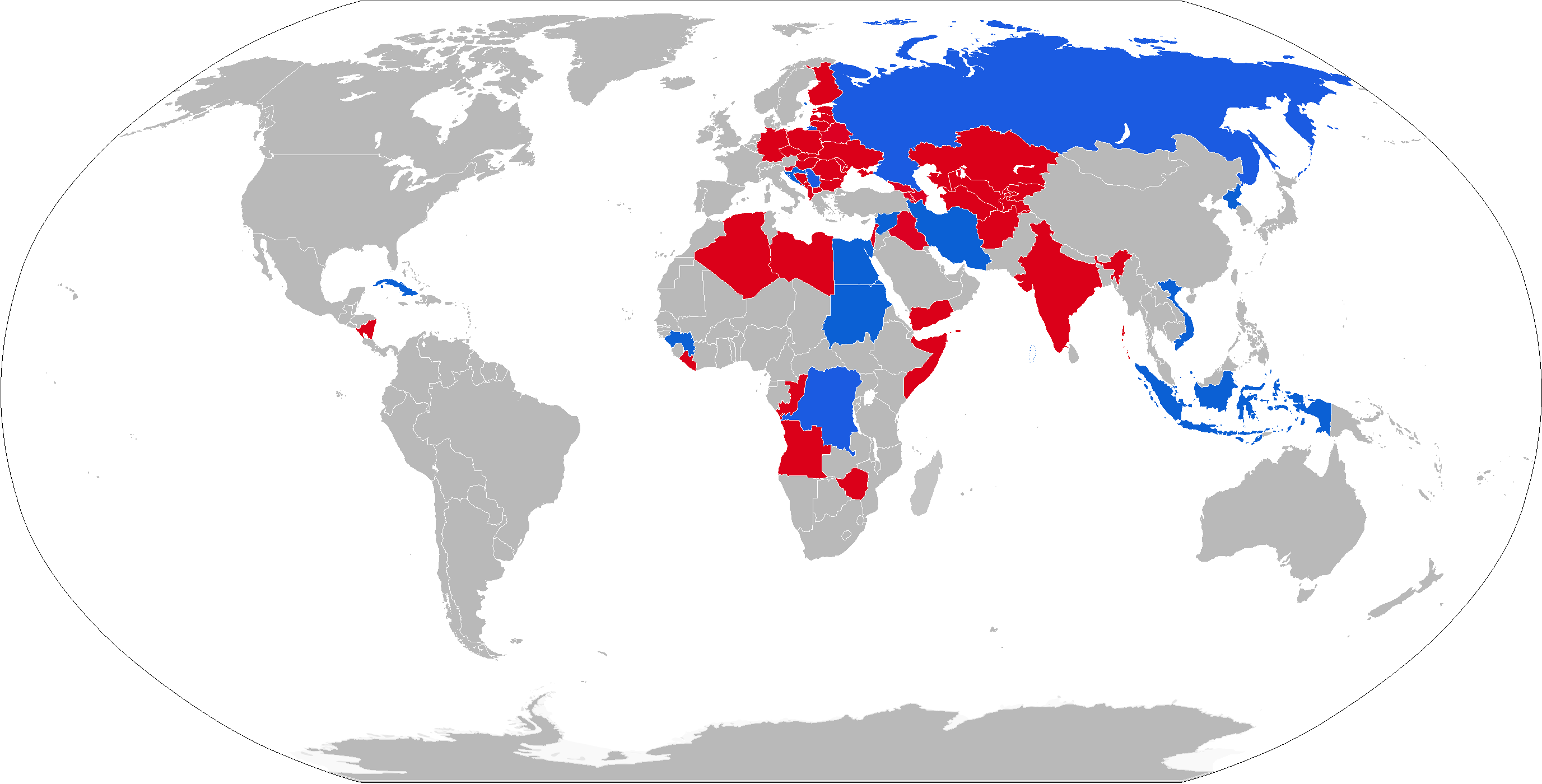
A map of BTR-50 operators in blue with former operators in red

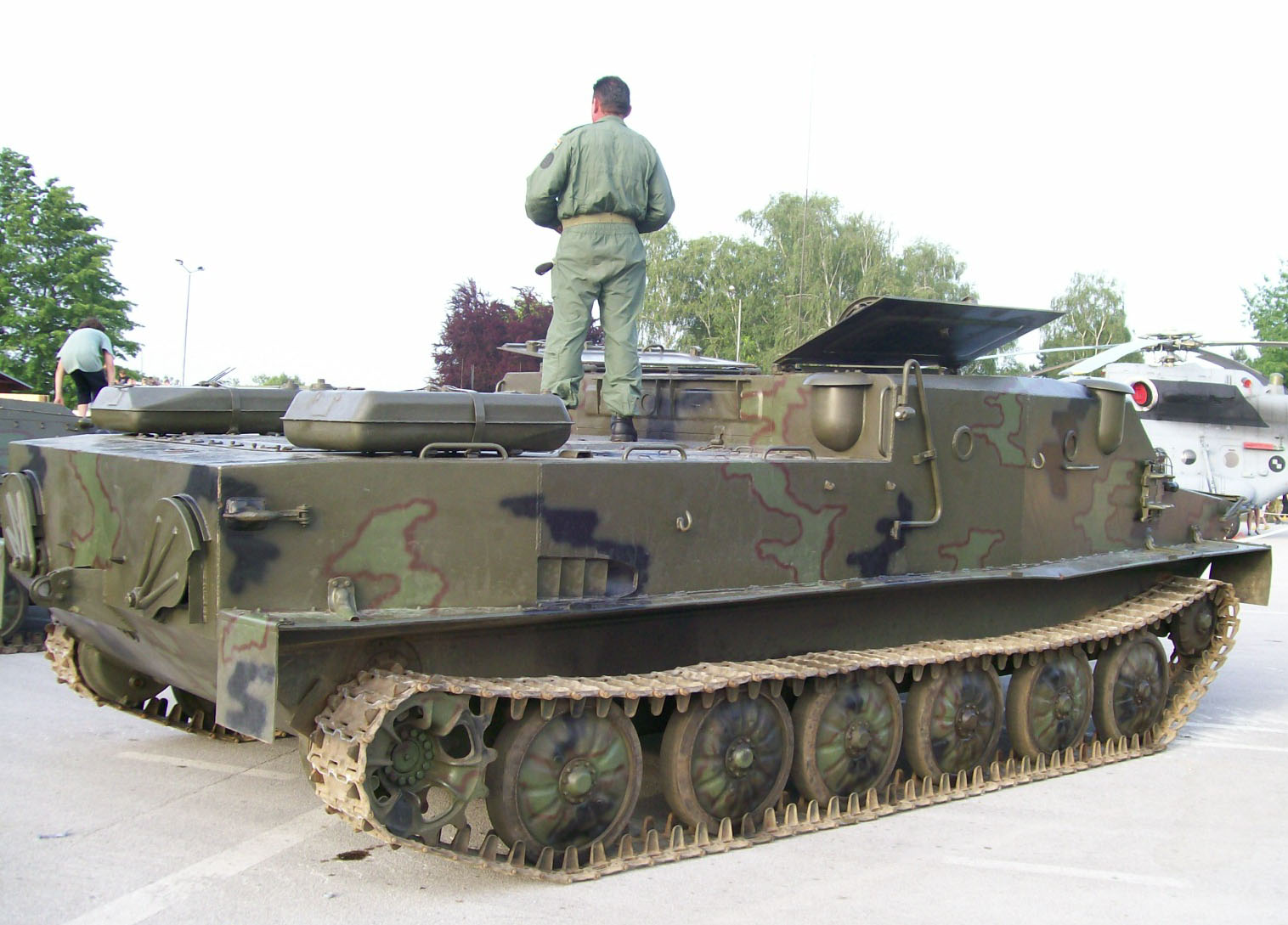
A Croatian Ground Army late production BTR-50PK.

=== Current operators ===
- Afghanistan – 100 ordered in 1963 from the Soviet Union and delivered between 1965 and 1966. 560 ordered in 1979 from the Soviet Union and delivered between 1979 and 1988 (the vehicles were previously in Soviet service).
- Albania – 200 BTR-50s and 150 Type 77s. It is currently being replaced by the American-made M113 armored personnel carrier.
- Algeria – 130 BTR-50s' ordered in 1977 from the Soviet Union and delivered between 1978 and 1979 (the vehicles were previously in Soviet service). Currently 30 BTR-50s and OT-62 TOPASes are in service.
- Angola – 92 were ordered in 1975 from the Soviet Union and delivered in 1975 (the vehicles were previously in Soviet service).
- Republic of the Congo
- Cuba – 200
- Democratic Republic of the Congo - Currently 3 are in service.
- Egypt – 500 were ordered in 1964 from the Soviet Union and delivered between 1965 and 1966 (the vehicles were possibly previously in Soviet service). 250 BTR-50PKs are currently in service. On 12 July 2014, 500 BTR-50s were upgraded to BTR-50PKM standard with UTD-201S diesel engine and includes a new set of day and night sensors.
- Guinea – 10 were ordered in 1981 from the Soviet Union and delivered in 1982 (the vehicles were second-hand).
- Indonesia – 66 BTR-50P/PM/PU were ordered in 1963 from the Soviet Union and delivered in 1963–1965. 34 BTR-50PK were ordered in 1997 from Ukraine and delivered in 1997–1999. Currently ~70 are in service.
- Iran – 270 were ordered in 1966 from the Soviet Union along with 300 BTR-60Ps as a $110 million dollar deal and delivered between 1967 and 1968. 300 BTR-50s and BTR-60s in service in 2000, 2002, 2005 and 2008. An estimated 1000 is in storage. Iran has its own upgraded BTR-50 variant, the Makran IFV. Over 150 BTR-50s are currently in service, with hundreds in storage, per GlobalSecurity.
- Kazakhstan – 300 BTR-50s and BTR-60s in service in 2000, 2002 and 2005.
- Liberia – 8 purchased in 1987 from Romania.
- Libya – 36 were ordered in 1969 from the Soviet Union and delivered in 1970. 60 were ordered in 1977 from the Soviet Union and delivered in 1978 (the vehicles were probably previously in Soviet service). 700 BTR-50s and BTR-60s in service in 1986. 540 BTR-50s and BTR-60s are currently in service.
- Nicaragua – 1 BTR-50PU was ordered in 1982 from the Soviet Union and delivered in 1982.
- North Korea – 50 were ordered in 1966 from the Soviet Union and delivered in 1967. There were 1,010 Korshuns, VTT-323s, Type 63s (YW-531), BTR-40s, BTR-50s, BTR-60s and BTR-152s in service in 1985, 2,200 VTT-323s, Type 63s (YW-531), BTR-40s, BTR-50s, BTR-60s and BTR-152s in service in 1990 and 1995 and 2,500 VTT-323s, Type 63s (YW-531), BTR-40s, BTR-50s, BTR-60s and BTR-152s in service in 2000, 2002 and 2005.
- Russia - 1,000 BTR-50PU, BTR-50PUM, MTP-1 and UR-67 were in service as of 2003. In 2022 Russia reportedly brought an unknown number of BTR-50s back into service in Ukraine.
- Serbia – BTR-50PU
- Somalia – 30 were ordered in 1971 from the Soviet Union and delivered in 1973 (the vehicles were previously in Soviet service).
- Somaliland – 25
- Sudan – 50 were ordered in 1968 from the Soviet Union and delivered between 1969 and 1970 (the vehicles were previously in Soviet service).
- Syria – 150 were ordered in 1966 from the Soviet Union and delivered between 1966 and 1967. 400 were ordered in 1973 from the Soviet Union and delivered between 1973 and 1975 (the vehicles were possibly previously in Soviet service). Around 1,500 BTR-40s, BTR-50s, BTR-60s, BTR-152s and OT-64s were in service in 1990, 1995 and 2000 and around 1,600 in 2001, 2003 and 2005.
- Vietnam - 280 are being used by Vietnam People's Army, some were in maintained state.
- Yemen – Passed on from South Yemen

=== Former operators ===
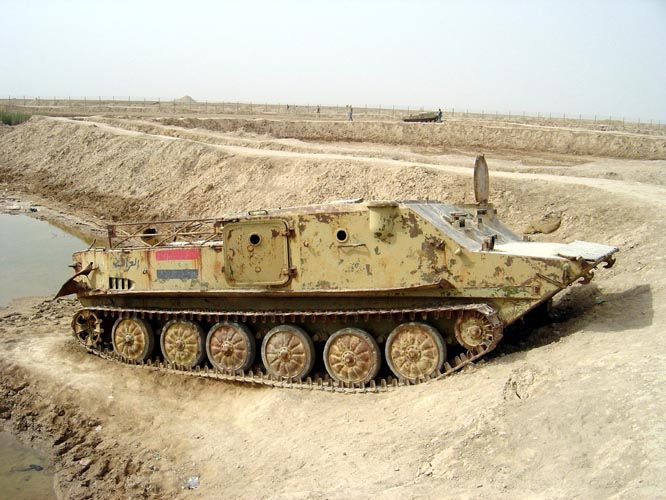
An Iraqi late-production model BTR-50PK used during the Iran–Iraq War recovered from mud, March 2004.

- Bulgaria – 700 ordered in 1959 from the Soviet Union and delivered between 1960 and 1963. Withdrawn from service.
- Croatia – 26 BTR-50Ps and BTR-50PKs captured from JNA. 18 in service in 1991 and 2003. they were then replaced by Patria AMV.
- East Germany – 200 SPW-50Ps and SPW-50PKs were ordered in 1958 from the Soviet Union and delivered between 1959 and 1962 (including command vehicles). Passed on to the unified German state.
- Finland – Total of about 80 used. 60 BTR-50PK delivered from Soviet Union in 1964–68. 40 BTR-50PK vehicles converted to BTR-50YVI variants from 1993. BTR-50PU vehicles delivered from Soviet Union in 1967–76. More delivered from ex-DDR in 1991. Converted to BTR-50PUM from 1985. Upgraded to BTR-50PUM1 from 1993. All versions withdrawn from use in 2018 and scrapped.
- Germany – Taken from GDR's army. All were scrapped or sold to other countries.
- Hungary – 150 were ordered in 1959 from the Soviet Union and delivered in 1960. 20 BTR-50PU-IIs were in service in 2019. Already retired.
- India – 200 ordered in 1977 from the Soviet Union and delivered between 1978 and 1979. Out of service as of 2026.
- Iraq – 250 ordered in 1968 from the Soviet Union and delivered between 1969 and 1973. All destroyed or scrapped.
- Israel – Captured a number of BTR-50 APCs from Egypt and Syria during the Six-Day War. A number was modified and served with the Israeli Army. Withdrawn from service in 2002.
- Romania - BTR-50PU, BTR-50PK retired.
- South Lebanon Army – 20 BTR-50PK APCs were received as aid from Israel between 1985 and 1986 (the vehicles were previously in Israeli service).
- Slovenia – BTR-50PU. Retired
- Soviet Union – Passed on to successor states.
- North Vietnam – 400 were received as aid from the Soviet Union between 1969 and 1973 (some of the vehicles were possibly previously in Soviet service). Passed on to the unified Vietnam state.
- South Yemen – 100 were ordered in 1972 from the Soviet Union and delivered in 1973 (the vehicles were previously in Soviet service).
- Yugoslavia – 217 (131 BTR-50PU and 86 PK) were ordered from 1964 to 1967 from the Soviet Union, and delivered from 1965 to 1976. Passed on to successor states.
