= OT-62 TOPAS =

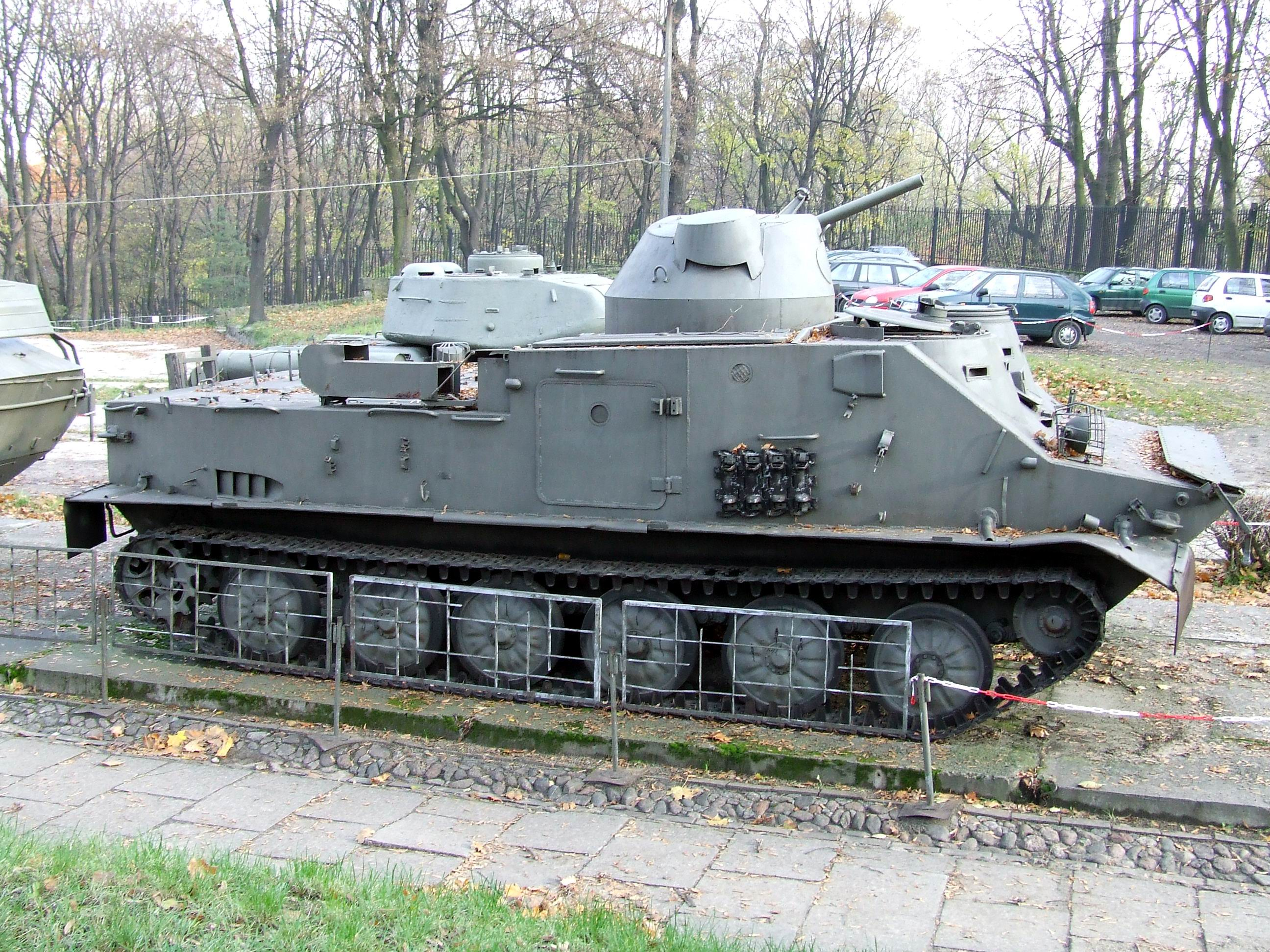
- TOPAS-2AP in Polish Army Museum in Warsaw, 8 November 2006.
- Type: Tracked Amphibious Armoured Personnel Carrier
- Place of origin: Czechoslovakia; Poland

Service history
- In service: 1962–present
- Used by: See Operators
- Wars: See Service History

Production history
- Designed: 1958–1962
- Manufacturer: Podpolianske Strojárne (PPS) plant
- Unit cost: $55,000 (vehicle's unit price for Morocco in 1967)
- Produced: 1963–1972
- Variants: See Variants

Specifications
- Mass: 15,000 kg (33,000 lb)
- Length: 7.08 m (23.2 ft)
- Width: 3.14 m (10.3 ft)
- Height: 2.23 m (7.3 ft)
- Crew: 2 (driver and commander) (+18 passengers)
- Armor: 6–10 mm (0.24–0.39 in)
- Engine: PV-6 6-cylinder, super-charged water cooled diesel 300 hp (220 kW) at 1,800 rpm
- Power/weight: 20 hp/t (15 kW/t)
- Suspension: Torsion bar
- Ground clearance: 0.37 m (1.2 ft)
- Fuel capacity: 417 L (110 US gal)
- Operational range: 460 km (290 mi)
- Maximum speed: 58.4 km/h (36.3 mph) (road); 10.8 km/h (6.7 mph) (water)

The OT-62 TOPAS is a series of amphibious tracked armoured personnel carriers developed jointly by the Polish People's Republic and Czechoslovakia (ČSSR). OT-62 stands for Obrněný Transportér vzor 62 – "armoured personnel carrier model 62". TOPAS stands for Transportér Obrněný Pásový – "tracked armoured personnel carrier".

== Development ==
In the late 1950s Czechoslovakia bought a license to produce BTR-50s from the Soviet Union. The received documentation was used to develop a new tracked armoured personnel carrier for Czechoslovak army and Ludowe Wojsko Polskie (LWP). The work started in 1958 and the first prototype was completed in 1962. After it passed the trials it was accepted and received the name TOPAS.

Because the standard TOPAS vehicle used by the LWP (Polish People's Army) was unarmed, the design bureau of Wojskowa Akademia Techniczna (WAT) (Military Technical Academy) designed a variant armed with a new turret placed centrally on top of the superstructure. Another TOPAS variant was designed by Wojskowy Instytut Techniki Pancernej i Samochodowej (Military Institute of Armour and Car Technology). The new variant received the designation WPT-TOPAS and was a technical support vehicle.

== Description ==
Like the BTR-50PK, the OT-62 TOPAS has a flat, boat-shaped hull and has a superstructure in the front of the vehicle. The hull of the OT-62 TOPAS is made of all-welded rolled steel with the crew compartment at the front, troop compartment in the center and the engine compartment at the rear. It can transport up to sixteen fully equipped infantrymen who sit on benches which run across the full width of the troop compartment. Their primary way of mounting and dismounting the APC is by climbing over the sides of the hull and going through two rectangular roof hatches. However, OT-62 TOPAS has side hatches in the sides of the superstructure, making for a good alternative to the rectangular roof hatches; thus it does not have the protection issue of BTR-50 APC in which the passengers did not have any kind of alternative route in and out.

The driver sits in the center of the front of the hull and has three vision blocks and periscopes located at the top of the sloping glacis plate. During night operations the center periscope is switched for the TVN-28 night vision device, which gives the driver a clear vision up to 60 meters. The driver also has a small hatch that opens upwards and, while it can not be used for the driver to leave the vehicle, it can be opened in relatively safe areas for extra vision. When in combat the hatch is closed and the driver can use a vision block for a limited vision. Under the driver's seat is an emergency hatch which can be used by all crew members.

The commander who sits on the left side of the front of the vehicle has three vision blocks, periscopes in a projecting bay, and a cupola with vision block on its basis facing forward. It is located on top of projecting bay, opens forward, and can be locked vertically. It also has two projecting bays like the BTR-50PU command vehicle instead of the one in BTR-50 APCs. However, the bays are different in shape. The second projecting bay also has three vision blocks and periscopes. On top of the second projecting bay is a cupola which replaces the additional rectangular roof hatch from the BTR-50PK.

The torsion bar suspension consists of six evenly spaced large rubber-tired road wheels with the drive sprocket at the rear and the idler at the front. The road wheels are hollow to ensure additional amphibious abilities. Usage of hollow road wheels increased APC's buoyancy by 30%. There are no track-return rollers. The first and last road wheels have a hydraulic shock absorber and the steel tracks with a single pin have 96 chain links each when new. There is a small, thin, horizontal skirt over each track. OT-62 has the PV-6 6-cylinder, inline diesel engine developing 300 hp (220 kW) at 1,800 rpm. The engine gives it a road speed of 58.4 km/h (36.3 mph) with a cruising range of 460 km (290 mi). The vehicle can cross 1.1 m (3.6 ft) high vertical obstacles and 2.8 m (9.2 ft) wide trenches and climb 40° gradients.

OT-62 TOPAS is amphibious thanks to its flat, boat-shaped hull which is watertight and ensures minimal resistance when APC is afloat, It can swim after switching on the two electric bilge pumps, erecting the trim vane which improves the stability and displacement of the vehicle in water and prevents the water from flooding the bow of the APC, and switching the driver's periscope for a swimming periscope that enables the driver to see over the trim vane. There is also a manual bilge pump for emergency use. The bilge pumps keep the APC afloat even if it is hit, is damaged, or leaks. In water it is propelled by two hydrojets, one in each side of the hull, with the entrance under the hull and exits at the rear of the hull.

There are additional assistant water-jet entrances in both sides of the hull over the last road wheels. The rear exits have lids that can be fully or partially closed, redirecting the water stream to the forward-directed exits at the sides of the hull, thus enabling the vehicle to turn or float in reverse. For example: to go left, the left water-jet is covered; to go right, the right water-jet is covered; and to make a 180° turn, the left water-jet sucks in water and the right water-jet pushes it out. This system was designed by N. Konowalow., and is the same system as in the PT-76 amphibious light tank. The vehicle has a low freeboard of 15 cm to 20 cm; however, it can compensate for this by using the snorkel, the mount for which is located on the right side of the front of the engine deck.

The vehicle is equipped with an IR driving light and an IR searchlight. The searchlight was removed from the right side of the front of the superstructure, as the area there was used for the second projecting bay. It was instead fitted on the commander's cupola. It also has two mounts for shovels on either side of the front of the vehicle as well as two mounts for pickaxes on the left side of the superstructure. A stowage bucket is placed centrally in the front of the engine deck.

== Service history ==
The OT-62 entered in service with the Czechoslovak Army in 1964, and with the Polish Army in 1966 as the TOPAS-2AP. The OT-62 was exported to Bulgaria, and a number of third world countries including Angola, Egypt, India, Iraq, Libya, Morocco, and Sudan. East Germany received at least 10 WPT-TOPAS armoured recovery vehicles in 1970.

Along with BTR-50, the OT-62 TOPAS were used by Egypt and Syria in the Six-Day War (1967). Some vehicles were captured and commissioned by the Israel Defense Forces. Both sides used BTR-50 and OT-62 TOPAS APCs during War of Attrition (1968–1970). During the Yom Kippur War (1973) the BTR-50 and OT-62 TOPAS APCs were also employed by both sides. Some of the Israeli BTR-50 and OT-62 TOPAS were later transferred to the South Lebanon Army.

Morocco used ex-Egyptian OT-62 during Western Sahara War. Moroccan armed forces lost 13 of them after a battle in Lebuirat on 24 August 1979.

OT-62 TOPAS also saw service with the Iraqi army during First Persian Gulf War and 2003 Invasion of Iraq.

== Variants ==
=== Former Czechoslovakia ===
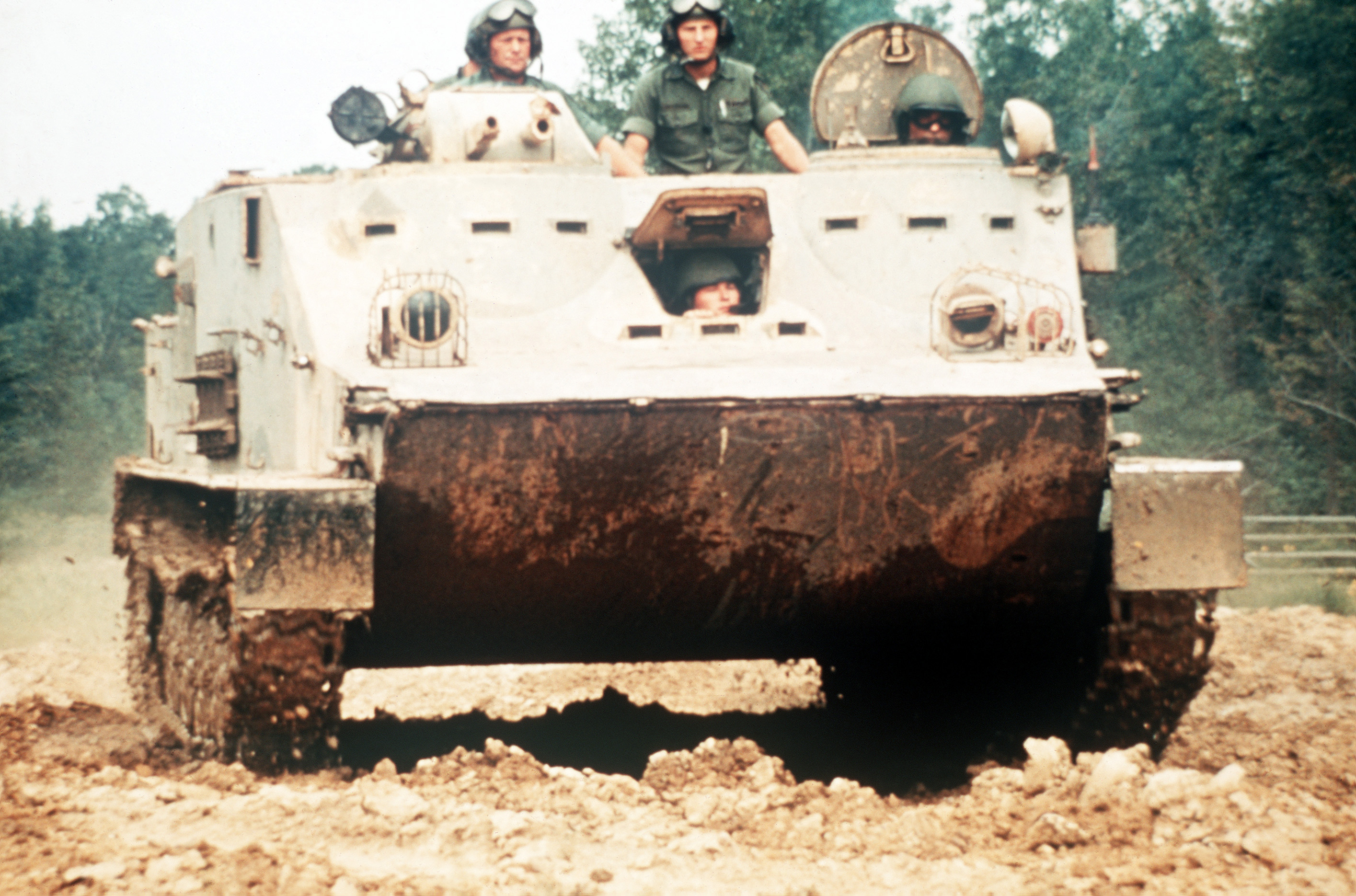
Czechoslovak OT-62B. Notice the small turret.

- OT-62 (OT-62 stands for Obrněný Transportér vzor 62 – "Armoured Personnel Carrier model 62") – a series of BTR-50 copies developed jointly by Poland and Czechoslovakia. They are similar to BTR-50PK but have side hatches in the hull sides, a stronger PV-6 engine with power of 300 hp (220 kW), and two projecting bays like the BTR-50PU.
  - OT-62A (OT-62 stands for Obrněný Transportér vzor 62 – "Armoured Personnel Carrier model 62") (1962) – Basic APC variant. The model used by the Ludowe Wojsko Polskie is called TOPAS (see Poland section for details).
    - OT-62B (OT-62 stands for Obrněný Transportér vzor 62 – "Armoured Personnel Carrier model 62") – APC variant fitted with a small turret on top of the second projecting bay replacing the cupola that was there. It is armed with the 7.62 mm Vz. 59T general purpose machine gun and the 82 mm T-21 "Tarasnice" recoilless gun on an external mount. The rate of fire of the 82 mm T-21 "Tarasnice" recoilless gun depends on how fast can the loader can reload it. To reload the recoilless gun the loader must exit the vehicle first exposing himself to enemy fire. The vehicle carriers 12 rounds for the 82 mm T-21 "Tarasnice" recoilless gun. The model used by the Ludowe Wojsko Polskie is called TOPAS-2A (see Poland section for details).
      - OT-62 R-2 R-105 – OT-62B converted into a signals and command vehicle with additional radios. The vehicle retains its small mg turret on top of the second projecting bay; however, it does not have the 82 mm T-21 "Tarasnice" recoilless gun on an external mount. The vehicle has four additional radios, R-113, R-112, R-105U and R-105d. It also has a generator and a stowage box on the left side of the engine deck.Photos
      - OT-62 R-2 R-108 – OT-62B converted into a signals and command vehicle with additional radios. The vehicle retains its small mg turret on top of the second projecting bay; however, it does not have the 82 mm T-21 "Tarasnice" recoilless gun on an external mount. It also has a generator and a stowage box on the left side of the engine deck.
      - OT-62 R-2M – OT-62B converted into a signals and command vehicle with additional radios. The model used by the Ludowe Wojsko Polskie is called TOPAS R-2M (see Poland section for details).
    - OT-62D (OT-62 stands for Obrněný Transportér vzor 62 – "Armoured Personnel Carrier model 62") – OT-62 carrying the 82 mm Bzk vzor 59 recoilless gun on the rear deck. It also retains original armament in turret (T-21 RR and UK vz. 59 MG).
    - OT-62A converted into an armoured ambulance.
  - DTP-62 (DTP-62 stands for Dílna Technické Pomoci – 62) – OT-62 converted into a technical support vehicle.
  - OT-62 R-3MT – OT-62A converted into a signals and command vehicle with additional radios. It has a generator and two stowage boxes on the engine deck. It also has a collapsible radio mast as well as two dome shaped ventilators on top of the superstructure. The cupola on top of the second projecting bay was moved to the center of the front of the roof of the superstructure.Photos
  - OT-62 R-4MT – OT-62A converted into a signals and command vehicle with additional radios. It has a generator and two stowage boxes on the engine deck. The hatch in the right side of the superstructure has been removed.

=== Poland ===
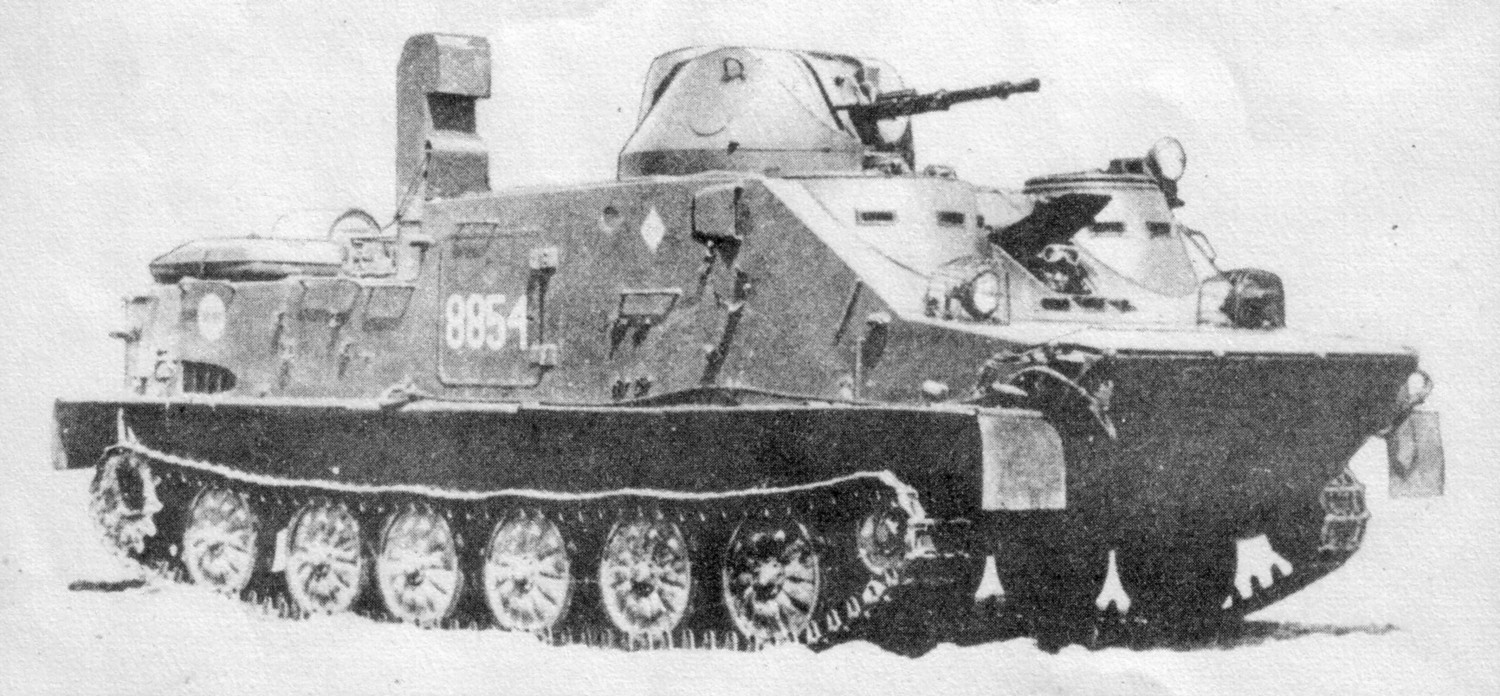
Polish TOPAS-2AP of the 7th Lusatian Landing Division

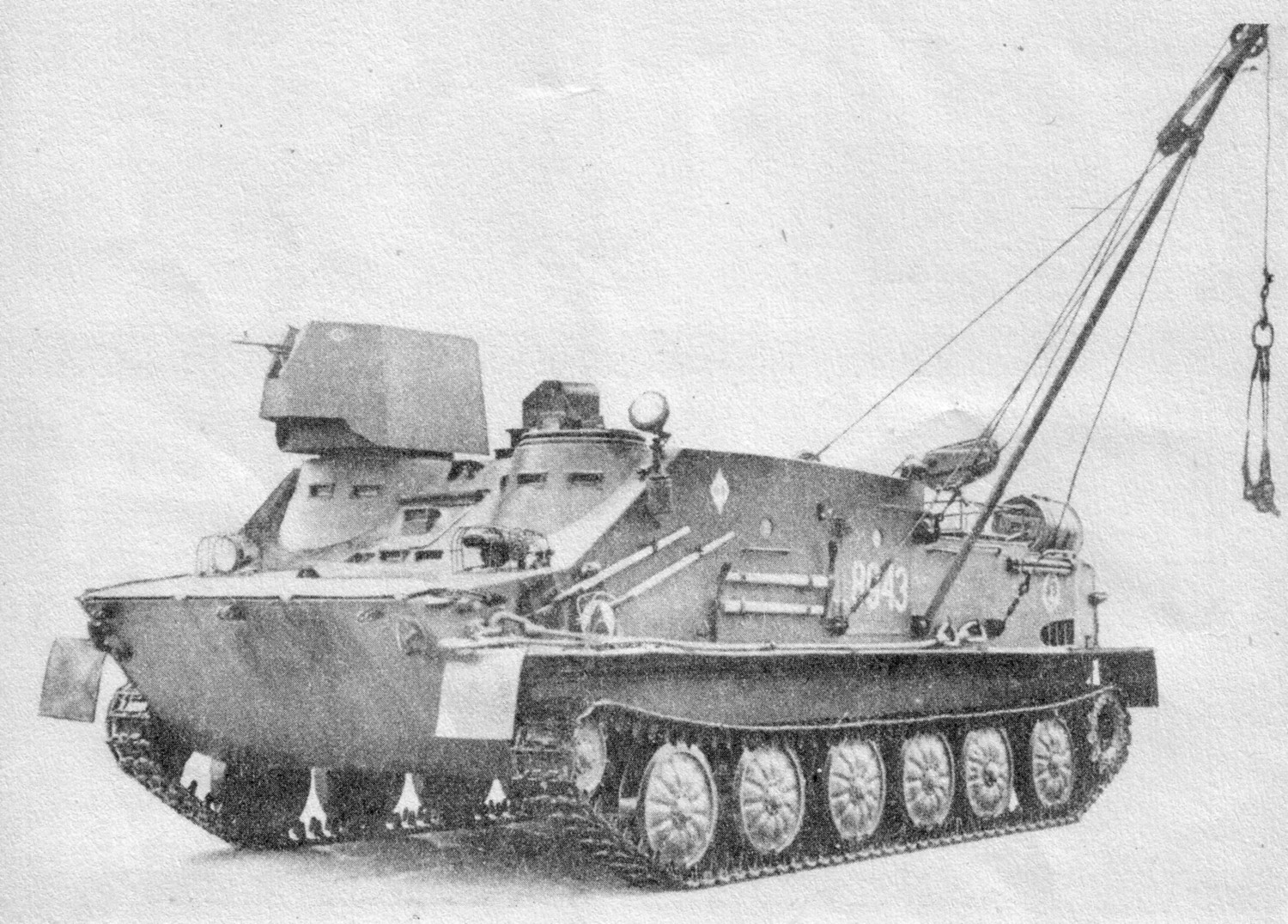
Polish WPT-TOPAS of the 7th Lusatian Landing Division

- TOPAS (transporter opancerzony średni = medium APC) – Basic APC variant. Some were fitted with a locater light between the two cupolas on top of two projecting bays (these were most probably used by Coast Defense units). The model used by CSLA is called OT-62A (see Czechoslovakia section for details).
  - TOPAS-2AP – Polish upgrade with a WAT turret placed centrally on the superstructure. It is armed with a 14.5 mm KPVT heavy machine gun and 7.62 mm SGMT coaxial medium machine gun. The same turret can be found on the SKOT-2AP. Later the 7.62 mm SGMT medium machine gun was replaced by the 7.62 mm PKT general purpose machine gun. Because of the turret the top rectangular roof hatches were moved to the sides of the top of the superstructure. The turret was operated by a gunner which therefore increased the number of crew members from two to three. Because the turret takes some space from the troop compartment, the number of fully equipped soldiers transported has decreased from sixteen to twelve. The turret increases the weight of the vehicle to 15.1 tonnes, and 16 tonnes when loaded with combat equipment. The TOPAS-2AP was also used by Polish mortar crews. Each vehicle can carry two 82 mm mortar squads, each squad with a crew of four and an 82 mm mortar.
  - WPT-TOPAS (WPT stands for Wóz Pogotowia Technicznego – "Technical Support Vehicle") – TOPAS converted into a technical support vehicle which was intended to evacuate damaged TOPAS APCs and PT-76 amphibious light tanks from the battlefield, especially the ones trapped by water obstacles with their amphibious ability broken. It was also intended to repair these vehicles in field conditions and bring medical help to the wounded crew members. Its equipment included a winch with a maximum capacity of 2.5 tonnes, 600 m of cable used to pull out trapped vehicles, a manual crane with a maximum capacity of 1 tonne and capability to be fitted in different parts of the vehicle, stowage boxes with tools, devices and equipment used to repair damaged vehicles in field conditions, a welding set, pontoon, and equipment for divers. The vehicle is armed with a single PK general purpose machine gun mounted on the right side of the cupola with large v-shaped shield around it.
  - TOPAS R-3M – TOPAS converted into a signals and command vehicle with additional radios.

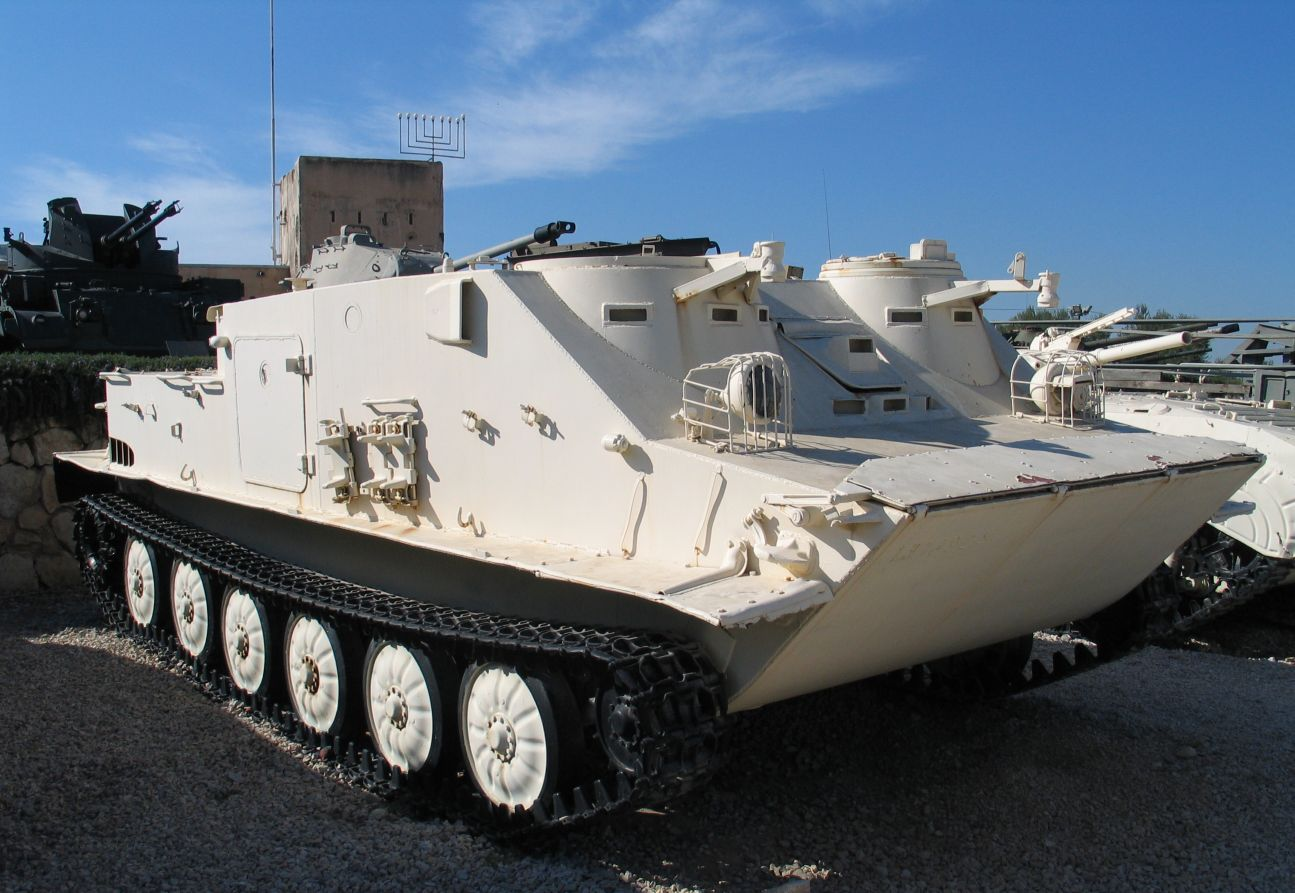
Israeli-modified ex-Syrian or ex-Egyptian OT-62A TOPAS APC in Yad la-Shiryon Museum, Israel, 2005

=== India ===
- FRT TOPAS (FRT stands for Forward Repair Team vehicle) – TOPAS-2A converted into a technical support vehicle.

=== Iraq ===
- OT-62A - fitted with the slab-sided turret from the Brazilian EE-9 Cascavel armoured car. It was intended to be used for fire support.

=== Israel ===
- OT-62A TOPAS - fitted with two machine gun mounts, each in front of a hatch on top of both cupolas.

== Operators ==
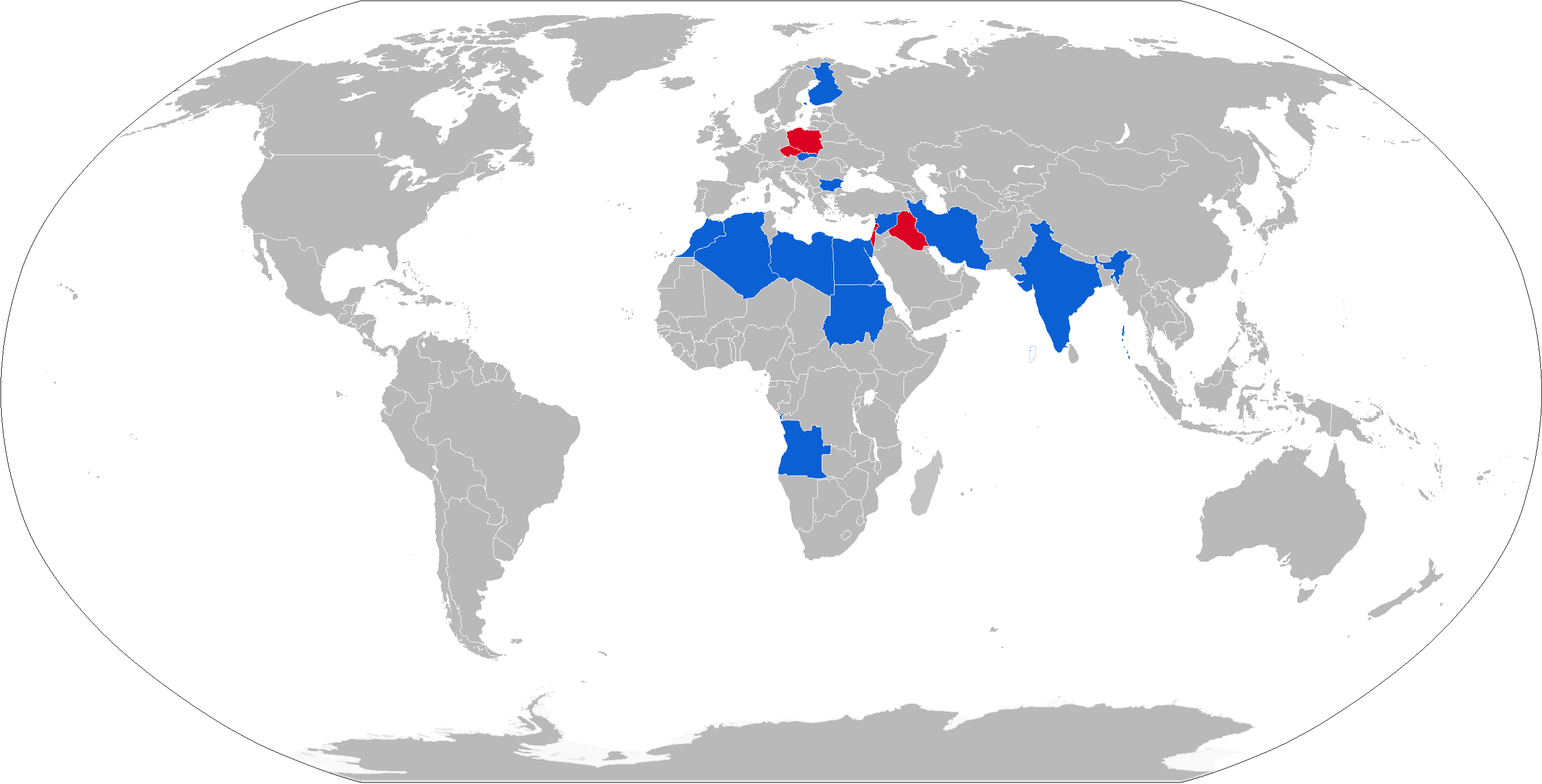
OT-62 TOPAS operators in blue with former operators in red

=== Current ===
- Egypt − 250 OT-62A delivered by Czechoslovakia between 1966 and 1968. 200 OT-62 as of 2024, modernized by Ukraine in 2010
- Sudan − 25 OT-62A delivered in 1968 by Czechoslovakia. Unknown number in service as of 2024

=== Former ===
- Angola − 50 OT-62A delivered by Czechoslovakia in 1976
- Bulgaria − 35 OT-62A delivered by Czechoslovakia in 1971
- Czechoslovakia – Passed on to successor states
- Czech Republic
- East Germany − 10 WPT-TOPAS delivered in 1970
- India − 300 OT-62A delivered by Czechoslovakia between 1969 and 1972
- Iraq − 100 OT-62A delivered by Czechoslovakia between 1968 and 1969
- Israel − Some captured vehicles during the Six-Day War and Yom Kippur war were pressed into service
- Libya − 50 OT-62A delivered by Czechoslovakia in 1971
- Morocco
- Poland – 600, produced locally. Used by Army and Marines
- Slovakia

== Bibliography ==
- Foss, Christopher F, ed. (1990). Jane's Armour and Artillery 1990-91 (11th ed.). Surrey: Jane's Information Group. ISBN 978-0-7106-0909-0.
- Foss, Christopher F, ed. (1994). Jane's Armour and Artillery, 1994-95 (15th ed.). Surrey: Janes Information Group. ISBN 978-0-7106-1154-3.
- International Institute for Strategic Studies (2024). The Military Balance 2024. Taylor & Francis. ISBN 978-1-040-05115-3.
