= R-311 (radio) =

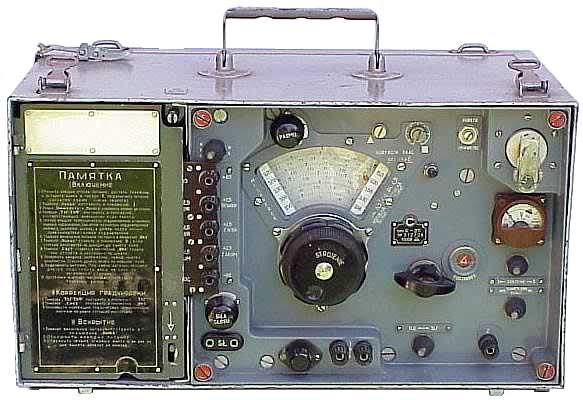
R-311

R-311 "Omega" (Р-311 «Омега») is a Soviet era shortwave radio receiver designed for military use. It was manufactured from 1954 until the mid-1970s.

== History ==
The receiver was developed in the design bureau of the Aleksandrovsky radio factory in 1949 under the direction of V. M. Khakharev and M. E. Movshovich using the R-253 "Alfa" (Р-253 «Альфа») receiver as a basis for the design. Serial production began in 1954, and it was adopted by the Soviet military in 1956.

== Deployment ==
When used by Ground Forces, the R-311 was used in conjunction with mobile radio complexes (R-102, R-118, R-140, R-820M, and command-staff vehicles BMP-1KSh and BTR-60PU, etc.). In the Air Force, they were equipped with mobile ground stations R-839 and R-843. The Navy also used the set on board ships.

The receiver was supplied to other Warsaw Pact countries and was exported to Vietnam, China, Cuba, and others.

At least 60,000 sets were produced. The R-311 receivers were transferred from front line service to DOSAAF organizations and were later used by radio amateurs.

== Technical specifications ==
The receiver is a superheterodyne design with one frequency conversion. The circuitry consists of eight identical 2Ж27Л pentodes. The set is intended for the reception of telegraphic and telephone (AM) signals. It has a quartz IF filter with a smooth adjustment of the bandwidth and an integrated quartz calibrator. It is also a "telegraph" heterodyne. The antenna socket is adapted to attach the Kulikov's type antenna. The output of the receiver is designed for simultaneous connection of two pairs of low-resistance headphones and a wireline with an impedance of 1500 ohms.

The receiver is assembled in a cabinet with two compartments. To the right is placed the receiver itself, and to the left are installed power sources and stored accessories - a portable lamp, headphones, and a whip antenna. The casing is plywood, with a duralumin sheet on the outside. The casing and controls are provided with seals to protect them from moisture. The receiver is equipped with a handle and straps for carrying.

- The receiver frequency range is divided into five sub-bands:
  - (I) 1.0 - 1.88 MHz
  - (II) 1.88 - 3.30 MHz
  - (III) 3.30 - 5.58 MHz
  - (IV) 5.58 - 9.20 MHz
  - (V) 9.20 - 15.0 MHz
- Intermediate frequency: 465 kHz
- Sensitivity for a signal to noise ratio of 3:1 and voltage on headphones of 1.5 V:
  - In telegraph mode - not worse than 3 μV
  - In a telephone mode - not worse than 7.5 μV
- IF passband: Adjustable, from 0.3 to 4 kHz
- Power supply options:
  - Battery 2KN-24 and vibration transducer VP-3M2 (time of continuous operation is not less than 12 hours)
  - Battery 2KN-24 and anode battery BAS-80 (time of continuous operation is not less than 24 hours)
  - AC mains 127 or 220 V through the rectifier ВС-3
- Permissible operating conditions: Temperature from -40 to +50 °C at a relative humidity of ambient air up to 98%
- Receiver's dimensions: 445 × 285 × 220 mm
- Weight of the receiver: 21 kg
- Weight of complete set with accessories and spare parts: No more than 38 kg

== Interesting features ==
- All the valves in the receiver are the same, which eliminates possible damage to the device during their rearrangement and reduces the inventory of spare parts.
- Due to the use of directly heated filament valves, the radio consumes a modest amount of power (about 4 W), which is comparable to that of similar transistor radios.
- The radio was not initially designed for receiving signals with single-sideband modulation; however, it can be modified to receive these signals.

== Bibliography ==
- V. I. Shapkin, The Red Ears, Soviet professional tube radio receivers from 1945-1970. Aviko Press, 2003. (Published in Russian)
