= Model 1981 "Shin'heung" =

North Korean amphibious light tank

Model 1981 "Shin'heung" Also known as Type 82 Western name: PT-85
- Later model of M1981 Shin'heung during a parade. Note the IR projector on the turret
- Type: Amphibious light tank
- Place of origin: North Korea

Specifications
- Mass: 20.0 t
- Length: 9.4 m (gun forward)
- Width: 3.1 m
- Height: 2.8 m
- Crew: 4
- Armor: 30mm hull
- Main armament: 1 x 85 mm tank gun 1 x 9M14 Malyutka launcher ATGM
- Secondary armament: 1 x 14.5 mm anti-air machine gun 1 x 7.62 mm machine gun
- Engine: diesel
- Suspension: Torsion bar
- Operational range: 500 km
- Maximum speed: 60 km/h on paved road 10 km/h in water

The Model 1981 "Shin'heung" (Rise), in western countries known as the PT-85, is a North Korean amphibious light tank. It is built for the needs of their army, with around 500 examples operated. The Model 1981 "Shin'heung is based on the lengthened VTT-323 APC chassis, and although the turret appears similar to PT-76, the PT-85 has a higher horseshoe-shaped turret, with an 85 mm gun and hatches similar to those of a T-54. The US Department of Defence calls it the M-1985.

== Model 1981 "Shin'heung" upgrades ==
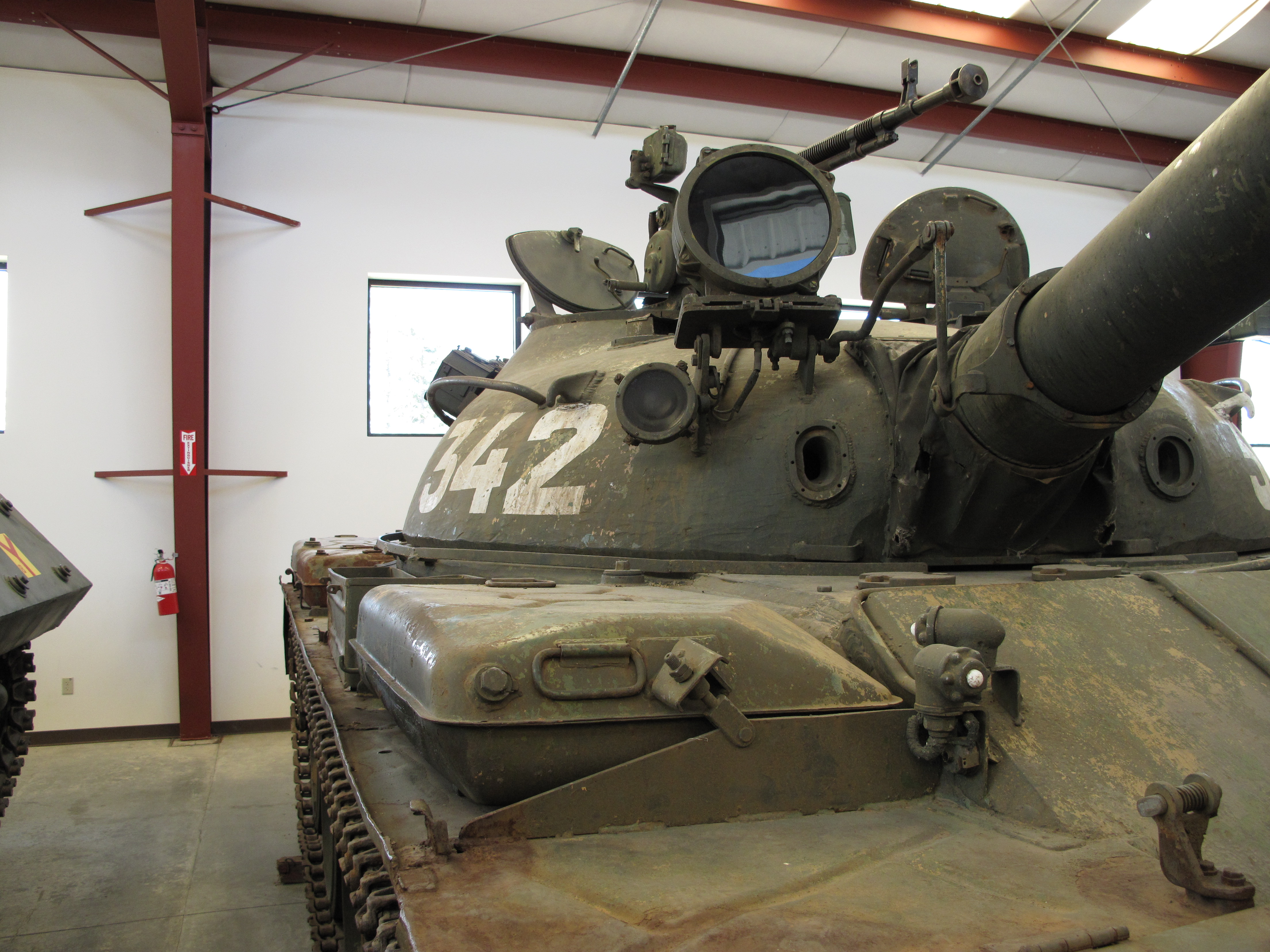
Right side of a T-62 tank showing the large L-2 Luna IR spotlight similar to the upgraded PT-85 tank

Early examples of the Model 1981 "Shin'heung" tank have shown a 9M14 Malyutka (AT-3 "Sagger") anti-tank guided missile installed on top of the turret directly above the main gun, and with two lights on the front of either side of the hull. In recent parades, the Model 1981 "Shin'heung" has been observed with a large IR projector (possibly a reverse engineered copy of an L-2 Luna IR spotlight on the turret, linked to the gun with a brace for elevation, as on the Soviet T-55/62 tanks.

The arrangement of the lights on the hull has also changed: there are three lights on the right side of the front glacis (two black ones and one white), plus one on the left side plate; sometimes some of these lights are omitted. The AT-3 "Sagger" missile is also now absent on the PT-85; it is unclear if these new or upgraded variants can be armed with that missile, and if so where the launcher would be installed. It is also possible that the tank was never able to fire the missile and it was only mounted to parade tanks to confuse observers.

In 2015, Model 1981 "Shin'heung" tanks in parades have also been observed with a Manpad SAM installed on the rear of the turret, as well as three smoke mortars on each side of the turret.
