= PT-76 =

Soviet amphibious light tank

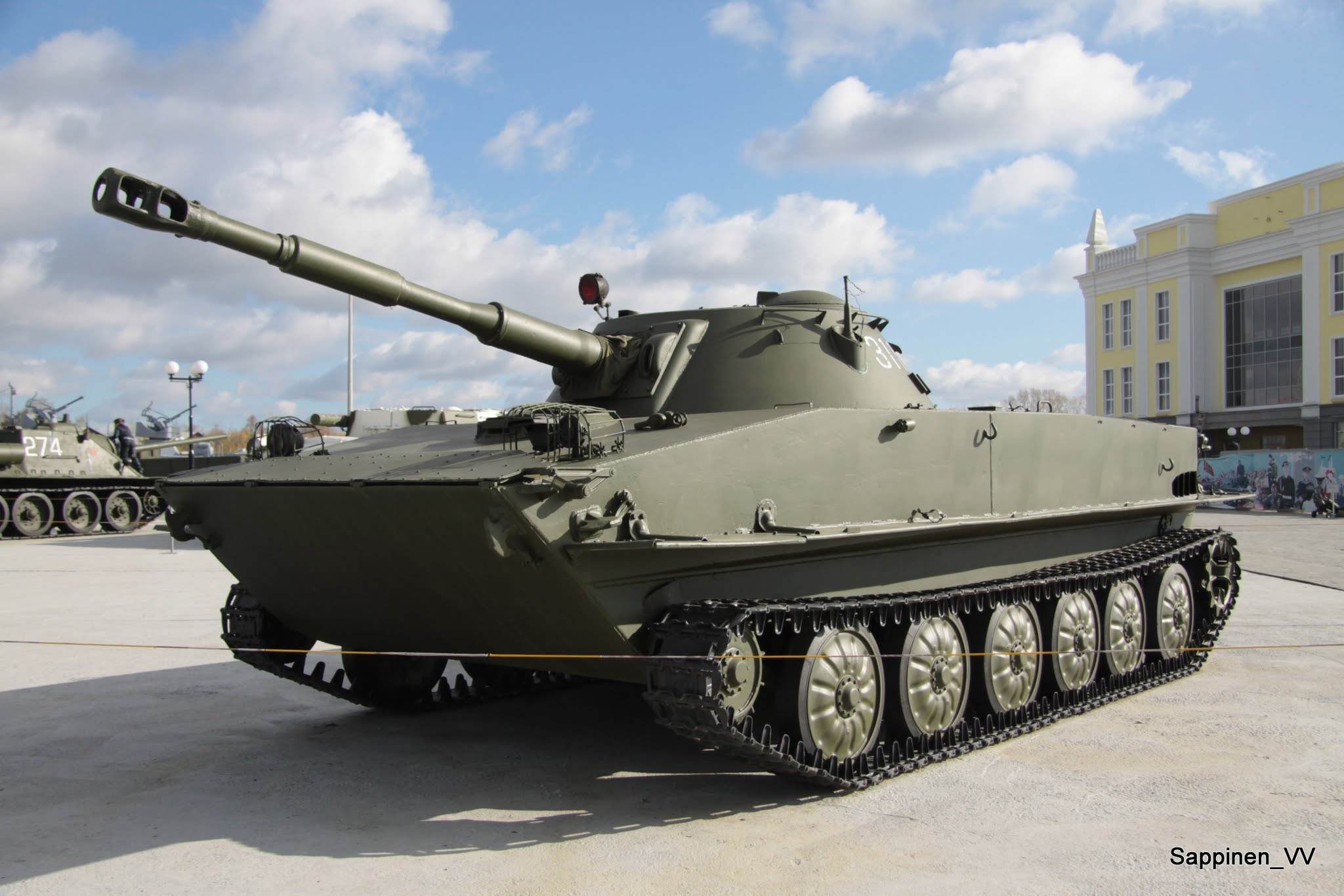
- A PT-76 at the Verkhnyaya Pyshma Tank Museum, 2012
- Type: Amphibious light tank
- Place of origin: Soviet Union

Service history
- In service: 1951–present

Production history
- Designer: N. Shashmurin and Zh.Y. Kotin
- Designed: 1949–1951
- Manufacturer: VTZ, Kirov Factory
- Produced: 1951–1969 (chassis possibly still produced)
- No. built: Around 12,000 . (Other sources indicate 5000 were built. See footnote 3).

Specifications (PT-76 model 1)
- Mass: 14.6 t (16.1 short tons; 14.4 long tons)
- Length: 7.63 m (25 ft) (gun forward); 6.91 m (22 ft 8 in) (hull)
- Width: 3.15 m (10 ft 4 in)
- Height: 2.325 m (7 ft 7.5 in)
- Crew: 3 (driver, commander/gunner, loader)
- Armour: RHA
- Main armament: 76.2 mm D-56T rifled tank gun (40 rds.)
- Secondary armament: 7.62 mm SGMT coax machine gun (1,000 rds.) or 7.62 mm PKT machine gun coax machine gun (1,000 rds) since 1967
- Engine: 19.1L 6 cylinder inline diesel 180 kilowatts (240 hp)
- Power/weight: 12.3 kW/t
- Suspension: torsion-bar
- Ground clearance: 370 mm (14.6 in)
- Fuel capacity: 250 L (55 imp gal; 66 US gal)
- Operational range: 370–400 km (230–250 mi); 480–510 km (300–320 mi) with external fuel
- Maximum speed: 44 km/h (27 mph) on road, 10.2 km/h (6.3 mph) swimming

The PT-76 is a Soviet amphibious light tank that was introduced in the early 1950s and soon became the standard reconnaissance tank of the Soviet Army and the other Warsaw Pact armed forces. It was widely exported to other friendly states, like India, Indonesia, Iraq, Syria, North Korea and North Vietnam.

The tank's full name is Floating Tank–76 (Russian: плавающий танк, romanized: plavayushchiy tank, ПТ-76). 76 stands for the caliber of the main armament: the 76.2 mm D-56T series rifled tank gun.

The PT-76 is used in the reconnaissance and fire-support roles. Its chassis served as the basis for a number of other vehicle designs, many of them amphibious, including the BTR-50 armoured personnel carrier, the ZSU-23-4 self-propelled anti aircraft gun, the ASU-85 airborne self-propelled gun and the 2K12 Kub anti-aircraft missile launch vehicle.

== Development ==
After World War II, the concept of light tanks was resurrected in the USSR. They were to be used in reconnaissance units and therefore an amphibious ability was essential. The requirements stated that the vehicle should be able to cross water obstacles with little preparation. Many prototypes of such light tanks were built in the late 1940s. The most successful was "объект 740" (Object 740) designed by the engineer N. Shashmurin working at the VNII-100 institute in Leningrad (a research institute of Chelyabinsk Tank Factory ChTZ) in 1949–1950, under an initial supervision of Josef Kotin from Kirov Plant. The vehicle was successful because it had a simple design, good navigational traits and a good cross country capability. At the time, its water-jet design was innovative.

A prototype was built at Kirov Plant in 1950 and the tank was officially adopted on 6 August 1951 with the designation PT-76. Production started at the Stalingrad Tractor Factory (STZ). The tank was subsequently modified. In 1957, the D-56T gun was replaced with the D-56TM—with double-baffle muzzle brake and fume extractor—and the hull was raised by 13 cm; additionally the tank was equipped with new vision and communications devices. First series tanks were subsequently modified, receiving the D-56TM gun and new equipment. In 1959 an improved variant, the PT-76B, was adopted and remained in production until 1967 (main improvements were the D-56TS gun with stabilization and CBRN protection).

In 1964 the United States obtained a PT-76 by undisclosed means. The tank was evaluated by the Tank-Automotive Center in February, and they claimed its armor was inferior to existing light American tanks.

== Design ==
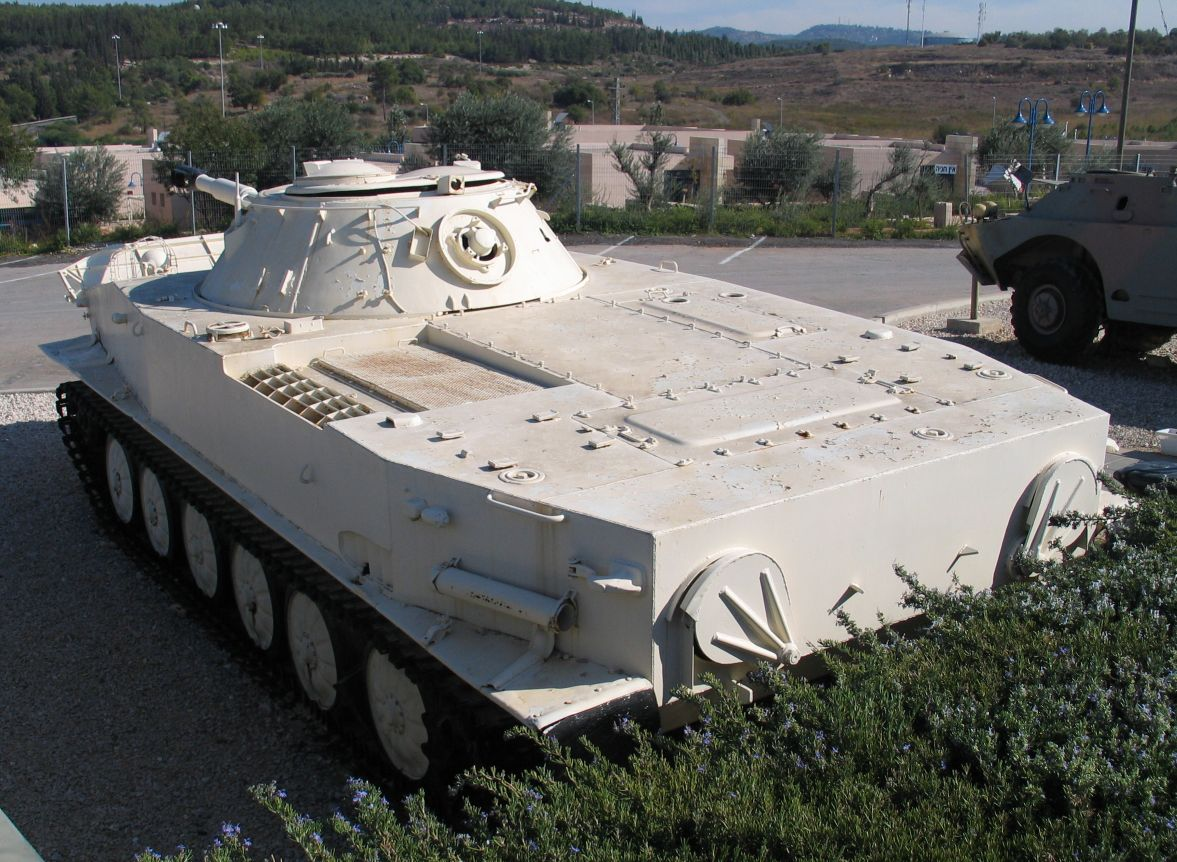
An Ex-Egyptian PT-76 in Yad la-Shiryon Museum, Israel. The water-jet outlets at the rear of the vehicle, both of which are closed, can be clearly seen.

The PT-76 has a typical tank layout: the steering compartment at the front, the combat compartment in the center and the engine compartment at the back. The tank has a three-man crew, with the commander also acting as the radio operator and gunner. This reduces his effectiveness as an observer. The commander and loader stations are located inside the turret, the commander sits on the left side of the main gun and the loader sits on the right. They have a large oval shaped double hatch, which opens forwards on top of the turret. The driver sits in the center of the front of the hull and has a one piece hatch that opens to the right, with three vision blocks and periscopes located beneath the main gun at the top of the sloping glacis plate. Under the driver's seat, there is an emergency hatch that can be used by all crew members. At night, the center periscope is swapped for a TVN-2B night vision device which gives the driver clear vision up to 60 meters.

=== Armament ===
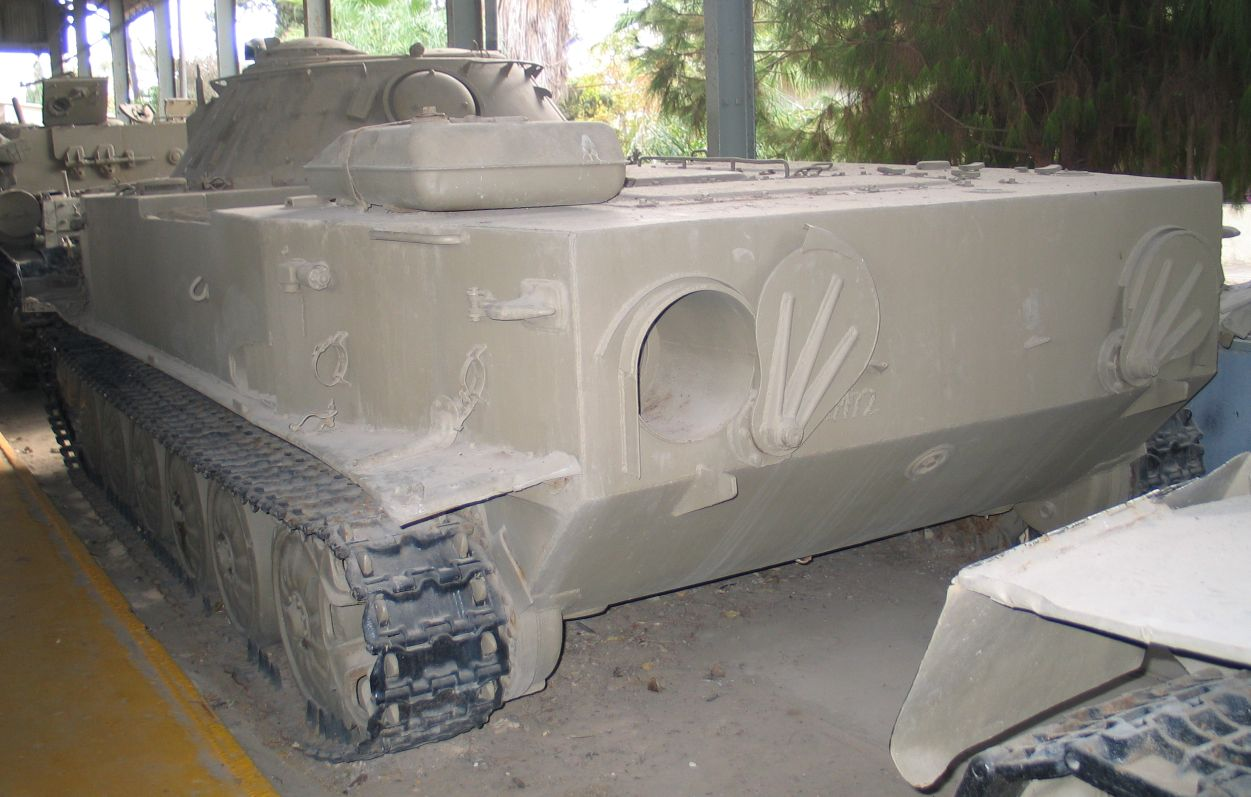
A PT-76 in Batey ha-Osef museum, Tel Aviv, Israel. In this view one water-jet outlet is open and the other is closed.

Its main armament consists of a 76.2 mm D-56T series rifled tank gun, which has an effective range of approximately 1,500 meters and a rate of fire of six to eight rounds per minute. This gun is 42 calibers long. The PT-76 carries 40 rounds for its gun. A typical ammunition load consists of 24 x OF-350 Frag-HE, 4 x AP-T, 4 x API-T and 8 x BK-350M HEAT rounds (with AP-T rounds substituted for HVAP when available). The gun is mounted in an oval dish-type circular truncated cone turret with flat, sloping sides which is mounted over the second, third, and fourth pair of road wheels. All PT-76s have a fume extractor for the main gun at the rear of the turret.

The 7.62 mm SGMT coaxial medium machine gun comes with 1,000 rounds. This weapon has a maximum effective range of 1,000 meters in daylight while the vehicle is stationary, 400 to 500 meters in daylight while the vehicle is on the move and 600 meters at night. Maximum range is 1,500 meters. It can be fired in 2 to 10 round bursts and has a practical rate of fire of 250 rounds per minute and a cyclic rate of fire of 650 rounds per minute. From 1967, the machine gun was replaced with PKT of the same caliber.

The main gun, which is considered light for a modern tank, can fire BM-354P HVAP, API-T, AP-T, BR-350 API-T and OF-350 Frag-HE rounds (as can the 76.2 mm M1942 (ZiS-3) divisional gun) and is capable of penetrating the armour of APCs and other lightly armored vehicles.

The commander/gunner has a cupola on the left side of the double hatch. The cupola has the TPKU-2B observation device and two TNP day periscopes and can be rotated 360 degrees by hand. The commander also has a 4X optical sight mounted to the left of the main armament and a TShK-66 sight/rangefinder. The loader has the MK-4 observation device mounted on the turret's roof in front of the hatch.

=== Ammunition ===
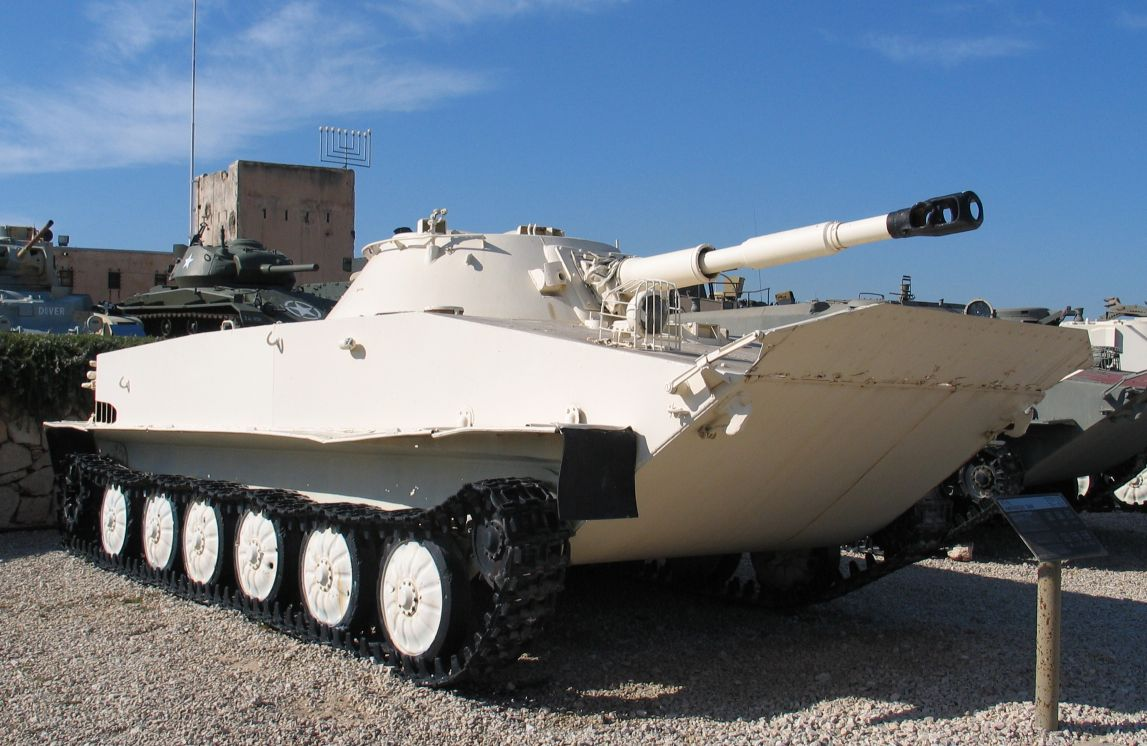
An Ex-Egyptian PT-76 in Yad la-Shiryon Museum, Israel. Note the elevated trim vane at the front of the vehicle.

Due to sharing ammunition with the ZiS-3 divisional gun, the PT-76 can use a wide variety of ammunition. The ammunition that can be used by the PT-76 includes OF-350 HE shells that can penetrate 50 mm at 17 degrees from a distance of 900 meters, with a maximum range of 12,000 m, BR-350B APBC-HE shells that can penetrate 75 mm at 500 meters and 67 mm at 1,000 meters with a maximum range of 2,000 m, BR-345P shells that can penetrate 90 mm at 500m and 60 mm at 1,000 m, which were replaced by BR-345N shells that can penetrate 125 mm at 500 m and 110 mm at 1000 m. Although the PT-76 was theoretically capable of countering contemporary western light tanks and even some main battle tanks, by the late 50s it was clear that it could not compete with modern medium and main battle tanks.

=== Countermeasures ===
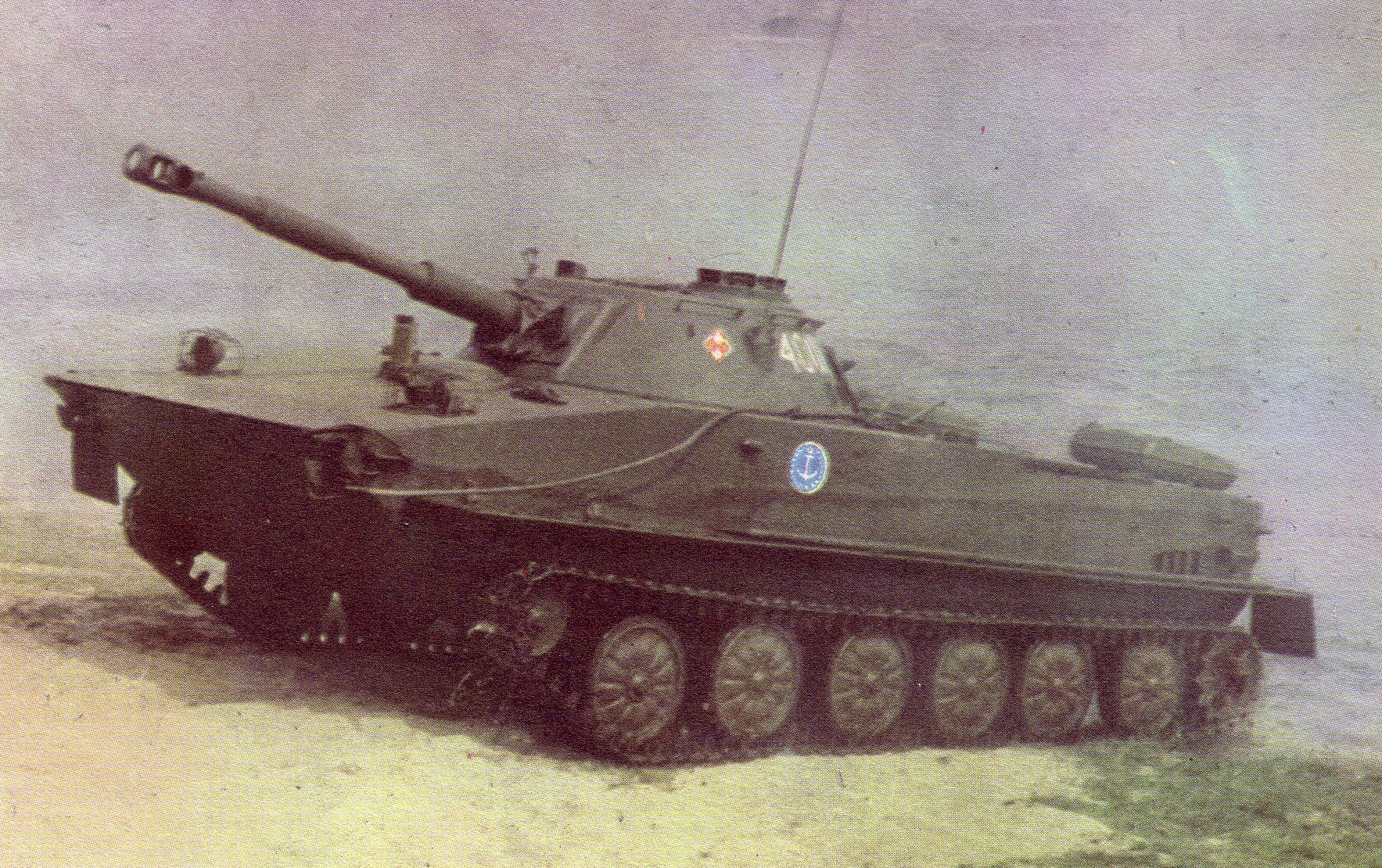
A Polish PT-76 amphibious light tank coming out of the water during an amphibious exercise. Note the two flat additional external fuel tanks at the rear corners of the hull.

The armor of the PT-76 consists of homogeneous, cold-rolled, welded steel. Its turret has 20 mm at 35° at the front, 16 mm at 35° at the sides, 11 mm at 33° at the rear and 8 mm at 0° on top of the turret. The hull is made up of: 10 mm at 80° at the upper front, 13 mm at 80° at the lower front, 14 mm at 0° at the sides, 7 mm at 0° in the rear and 5 mm at 0° underneath. The front gives it protection against 12.7 mm, small arms fire and small artillery shell fragments. The sides does not protect it against 12.7 mm or .50-caliber armor-piercing heavy machine gun fire or larger shell fragments.

=== Mobility ===
==== Land ====
The torsion bar suspension consists of six evenly spaced large rubber-tired road wheels with the drive sprocket at the rear and the idler at the front. The road wheels are hollow to minimize weight. These hollow road wheels increase the tank's buoyancy by 30%. There are no track-return rollers. The first and last road wheels have a hydraulic shock absorber and the steel tracks have 96 links each when new, each link has a single pin. There is a small, thin, horizontal skirt over each track. Its straight 6-cylinder, 4-stroke water-cooled diesel engine was developed under the designation "V-6" by halving the "V-12"-engine from the T-54/55. It develops 240 hp (179 kW) at 1,800 rpm which gives it a road speed of 44 km/h and a range of 370 km to 400 km. The vehicle can cross 1.1 m high vertical obstacles and 2.8 m wide trenches and climb 52° gradients. The engine has a cooling system and an initial heater (intended for use when the air temperature is −20 °C or colder). The PT-76 has a 5-speed manual shaft-type transmission system similar to the one in the T-34/85. The gearbox has four forward gears and one reverse. The vehicle has a side clutch that enables it to make turns and a handbrake. The tank has four mounts for additional external fuel tanks at the rear of the hull. The two on the corners are for flat type external tanks and the two in the center are for a drum type. These additional tanks increase the range from 370 to 400 km to 480–510 km. The PT-76 is a reliable, simple to operate and highly mobile reconnaissance vehicle and is ideally designed for amphibious operations, but it has many limitations as a fighting vehicle.

==== Water ====
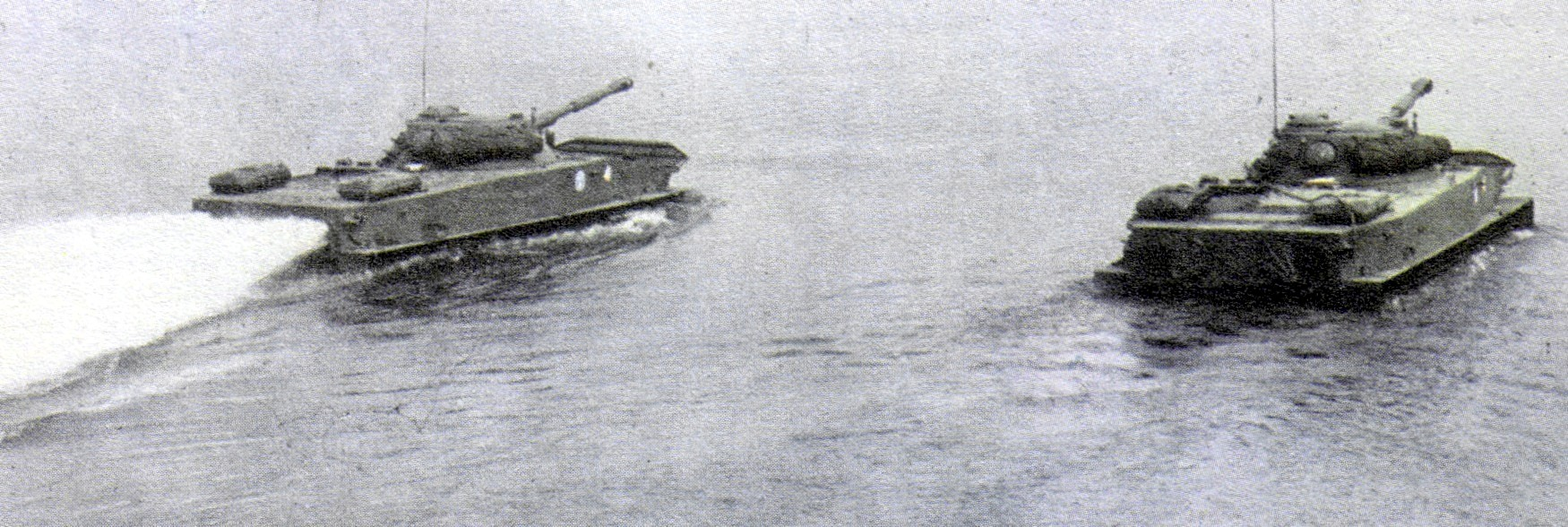
Swimming Polish PT-76s.

The PT-76 is amphibious, it has a flat, boat-shaped hull which is hermetical and ensures minimal resistance when the tank is afloat. It can swim after switching on the two electric bilge pumps, erecting the trim vane which improves the vehicle's stability and displacement in the water and prevents water from flooding into the bow of the tank. Switching the driver's periscope for a swimming periscope enables the driver to see over the trim vane. When not in use the trim vane is stowed in the front of the bow under the barrel of the main gun and serves as additional armor. Bilge pumps keep the tank afloat even if it leaks or is damaged. There is a manual bilge pump for emergency use. The tank is propelled through the water by two hydrojets, one on each side of the hull, with the inlets underneath the hull and the outlets at the rear. There are also additional assistant water-jet inlets on both sides of the hull over the last road wheels. The rear outlets have lids that can be fully or partially closed, redirecting the water stream to the forward-directed outlets at the sides of the hull, thus enabling the vehicle to turn or go in reverse. To turn to the left for example, the left water-jet is covered, to turn to the right, the right water-jet is covered. To make a 180° turn, one water-jet sucks in water while the other pushes it out. This system was designed by N. Konowalow. It is the same system as the one used in the BTR-50 APC, which was based on the PT-76. The tank can swim at up to 10.2 km/h and has a range of 100 km. It can cross most water obstacles and can also swim in the sea. However, its amphibious design makes it disproportionally large for a vehicle of its weight and allows less armor protection than other light tanks.

=== Equipment ===
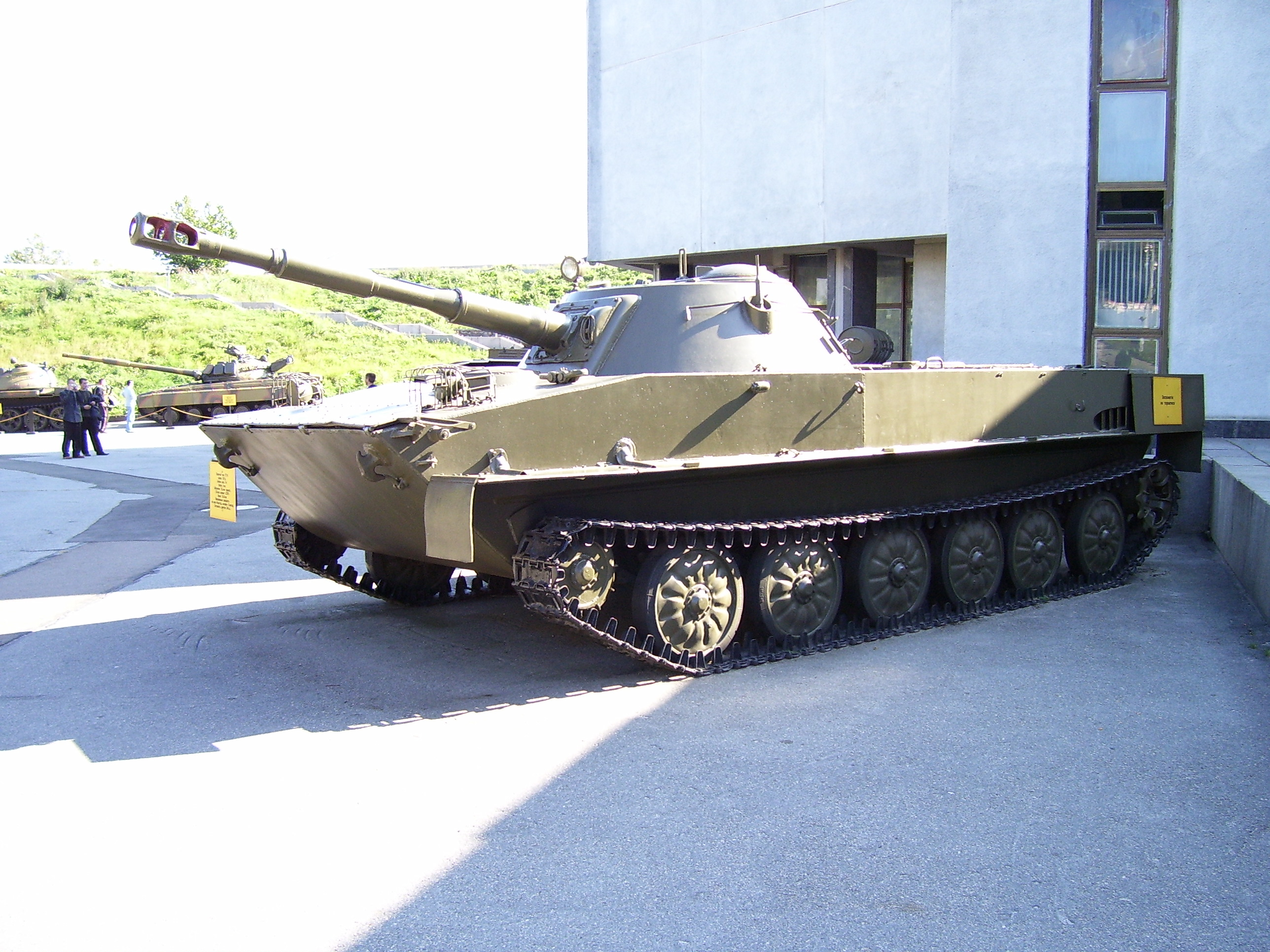
A PT-76 in the Museum of the Great Patriotic War, Kyiv, with another view of the radio antenna on the left-hand side of the turret.

The PT-76 is equipped with a tank communication device, a gyro compass, a 10-RT-26E radio with an antenna that extends itself when needed. It also has two headlights in front of the hull and a searchlight on the right-hand side of the top of the turret. It lagged behind other Soviet armoured fighting vehicles because only the driver had a night vision device and also because it has no fire or NBC (nuclear, biological, chemical) protection systems, which significantly reduced its effectiveness. The lack of NBC protection ended with the PT-76B, which has the PAZ ("protivo-atomnaya zashchita") NBC protection system. Because only the driver has night vision equipment, the crew has a vision range of 4,000 m (13,000 ft) by day and 600 m (2,000 ft) at night.

== Service history ==
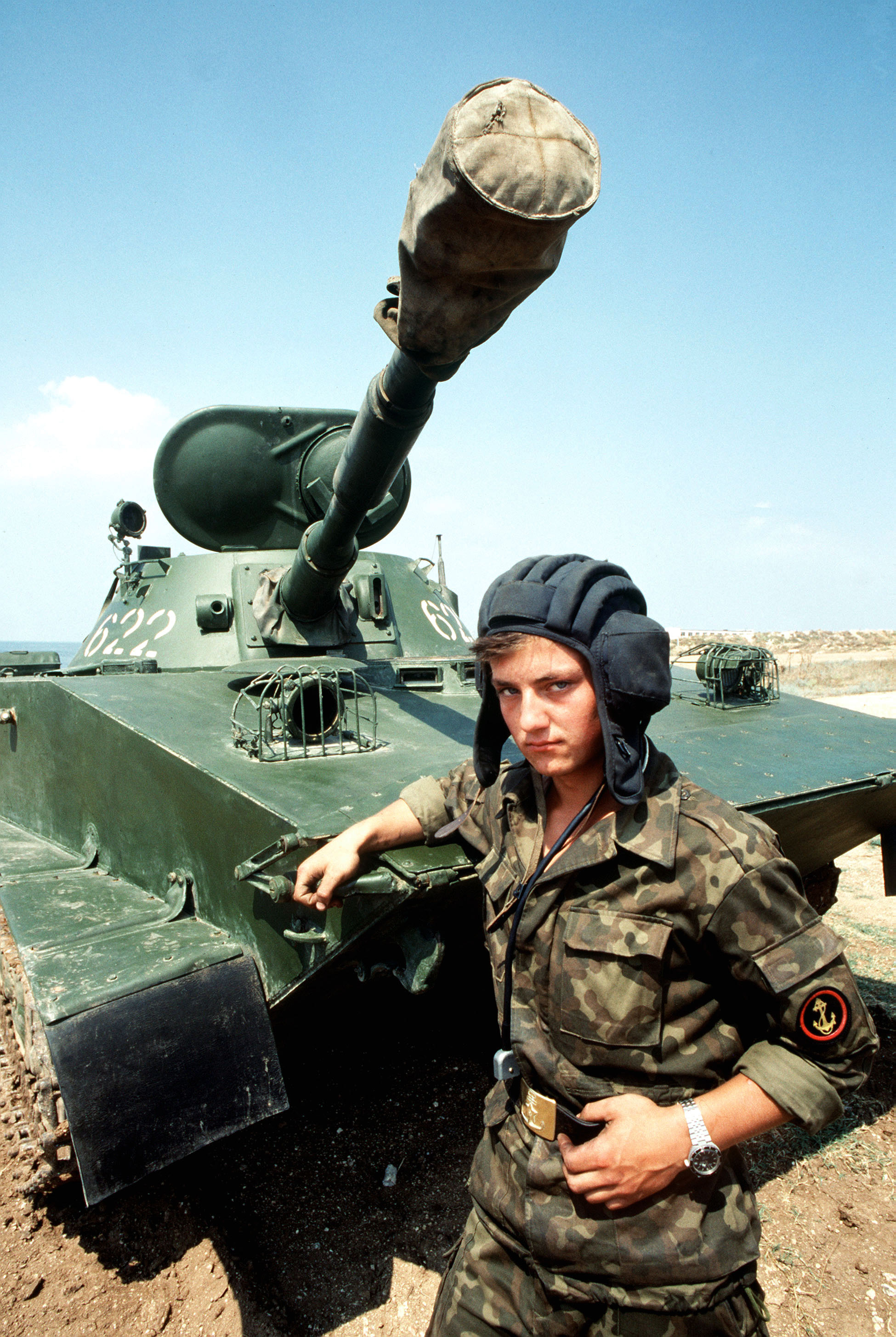
A Soviet naval infantryman poses with a PT-76 in August 1989. Note the large (opened) oval shaped double hatch, the searchlight on the right hand side of the top of the turret and a radio antenna on the left hand-side of the turret.

About 5,000 PT-76s were built during the vehicle's lifetime, of which some 2,000 were exported. Other sources indicate that 12,000 were built. (See footnote 1). Over 25 countries employed the vehicle, including Afghanistan, Albania, Angola, China, Congo, Cuba, Egypt, Finland, Guinea, Hungary, India, Indonesia, Iraq, Laos, Madagascar, Mozambique, North Korea, Pakistan, Poland, North Vietnam, and Yugoslavia.

The PT-76 was used as the standard reconnaissance tank of the Soviet Union and Warsaw Pact armies. It was also intended for water obstacle fording operations and naval infantry landings. It served in the reconnaissance subunits of tank divisions and mechanized divisions of the Red Army and Soviet marines divisions. Although it has been replaced in front line service by the BMP-1, it may still be found in the reconnaissance companies and battalions of some motorized rifle and tank regiments and divisions, as well as in naval infantry units. Aside from its reconnaissance role, it is also used for crossing water obstacles in the first wave of an attack and for artillery support during the establishment of a beachhead. The main disadvantage of the BMP-1 and the BRM-1 when compared to the PT-76 is the absence of a powerful main armament. However, the BRM-1 is fitted with more modern reconnaissance equipment. Also, both vehicles have stronger front armor and superior mobility features and the BMP-1 can carry up to 8 fully equipped soldiers inside. The PT-76 is still on active service in a number of countries mainly in the developing world. The Russian Army is reported to have used PT-76 units in the war in Chechnya.

The PT-76 is used/stationed by/in following Russian units/bases: 61st tank repair plant (1), 61st Kirkinesskaya marine brigade (26) from Sputnik, which is part of the Murmansk military district, 175th marine brigade (26) from Tumannyy, which is part of the Murmansk military district and 336th Belostokskaya marine brigade (26) from Baltyysk, which is part of the Kaliningrad military district.

In Ludowe Wojsko Polskie (LWP), PT-76s and PT-76Bs were used by the reconnaissance subunits of tank divisions and mechanized divisions and Coastal Defense units including the 7th Lusatian Landing Division (officially known as 7th Coast Defense Division). Poland also operated FROG-3 "Luna" tactical missile launch vehicles.

PT-76s were in service with the Indian Army and they were in reserve status before they were withdrawn from service in 2009, after which they were used for target practice by the army and as static memorials at various military facilities.

=== Combat service ===
==== Vietnam War ====
Soviet PT-76s along with T-54s, T-55s, and Chinese Type 59s tanks formed the bulk of the People's Army of Vietnam (PAVN) armored forces.

The first successful action of PAVN armor in Vietnam was against the Lang Vei Special Forces camp on 6/7 February 1968 (they had already been used in the preceding Battle of Ban Houei Sane, which was just across the border in Laos however). Thirteen PT-76s, of the PAVN 202nd Armored Regiment spearheaded an assault against approximately 24 Green Berets, 500 South Vietnamese irregulars and 350 Laotian Royal soldiers. The defenders fought back with their 106 mm M40 recoilless rifle (one at the entrance took out three PT-76s until it was knocked out), and ineffectively with M72 LAWs (one-shot disposable 66 mm Light Anti-Tank Weapon). They requested support from nearby Khe Sanh Combat Base, which was unable to help, as it too was under siege. The Lang Vei camp was overrun, with the PT-76s using their turret-mounted spotlight-equipped heavy machine guns to shoot down any irregulars who panicked and ran out of the underground bunkers. A few survivors broke out and were airlifted to safety.

The first tank-to-tank engagement occurred in mid-1968 when a US reconnaissance airplane observed a PT-76 being washed by its crew in the Bến Hải River in the DMZ (17th Parallel). The Forward Air Control pilot radioed the tank's position to a nearby M48 Patton tank unit of the US 3rd Tank Battalion. With the FAC adjusting fire, the M48 fired three 90 mm rounds; obtaining a hit with the third round. The tank crew abandoned their vehicle. Shortly afterwards, some returning F-4 Phantom jet fighter bombers, with ordnance to expend, observed the PT-76 and bombed the remainder of the vehicle.

===== Battle of Ben Het =====
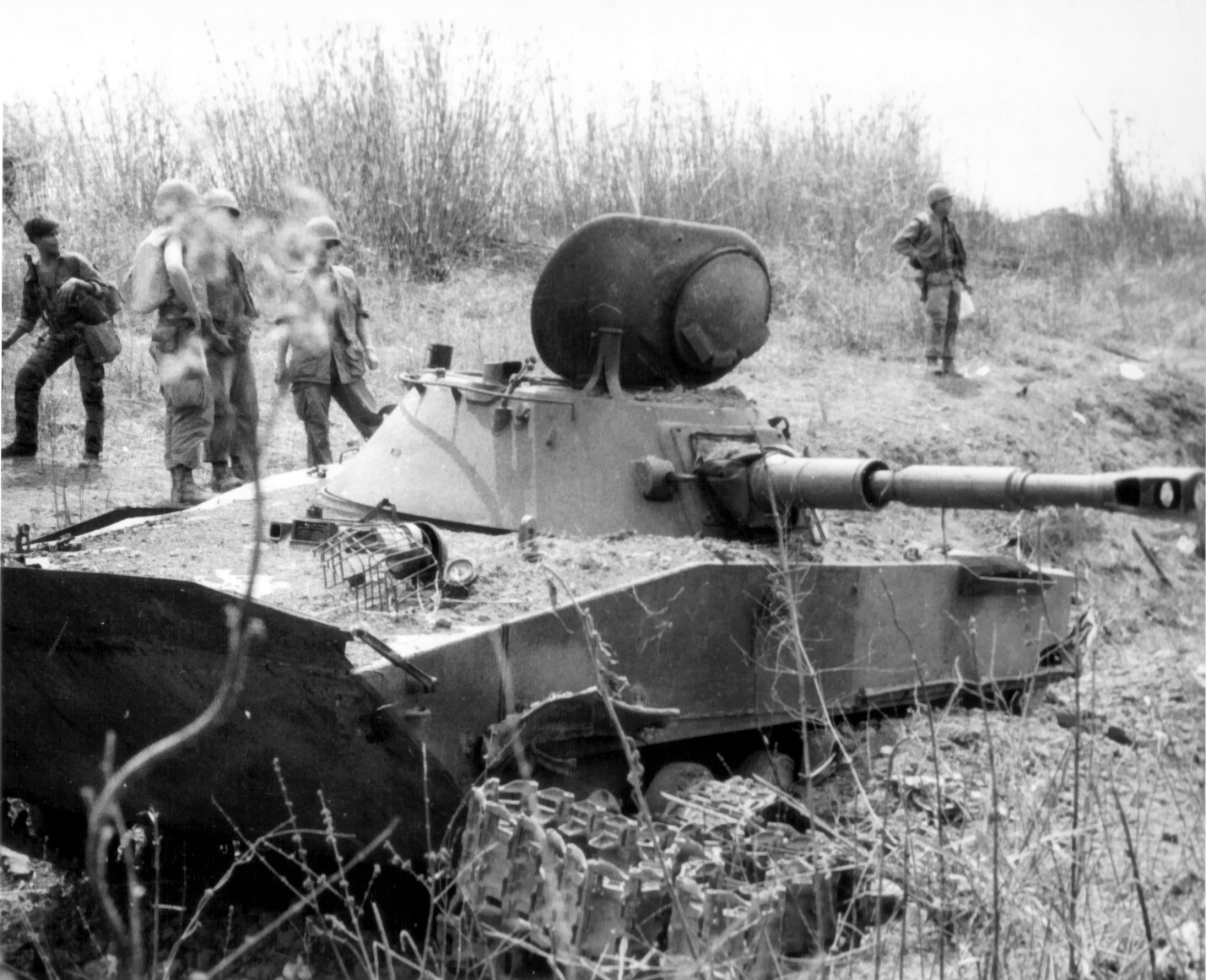
One of two PT-76s from the PAVN 202nd Armored Regiment, destroyed by US M48 Pattons, from the 1/69th Armored battalion, during the battle of Ben Het, March 3, 1969, Vietnam.

The Battle of Ben Het was the only PAVN–US Army tank battle during the course of the Vietnam War. 10 PT-76s faced 3 M48s. On March 3, 1969, the Special Forces' Ben Het Camp was attacked by the PAVN 202nd Armored Regiment. The 202nd was given the task of destroying the camp's 175 mm self-propelled guns. One of the PT-76s had detonated a land mine, which not only alerted the camp, but also lit up the other PT-76s attacking the firebase. Flares had been sent up, thus exposing adversary tanks, but sighting in on muzzle flashes, one PT-76 scored a direct hit on the turret of a M48, killing two crewmen and wounding two more. A second M48, using the same technique, destroyed a PT-76 with their second shot. At daybreak, the battlefield revealed the wreckage of two PT-76s and one BTR-50 armored personnel carrier.

===== First combat use of the TOW missile =====
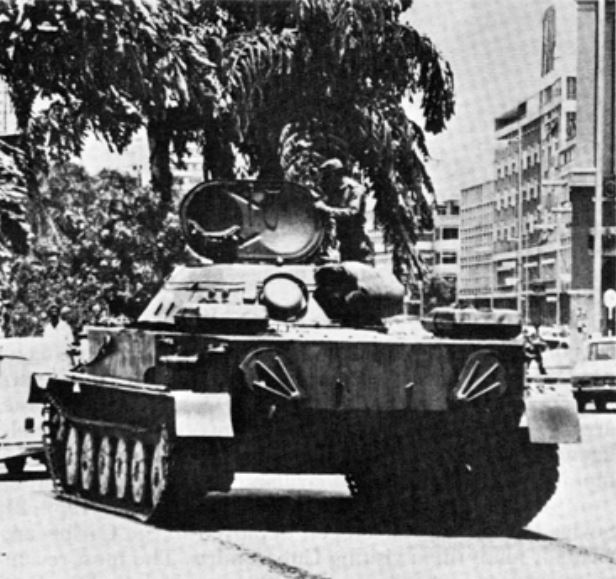
A Cuban PT-76 in Luanda during the Angolan Civil War, 1976.

The PT-76 was involved in a landmark incident in armored warfare, in being the first victim of the BGM-71 TOW anti-tank missile.

On April 24, 1972, the US Army special experimental 1st Combat Aerial TOW Team arrived in South Vietnam. It consisted of two UH-1B helicopters mounting the new BGM-71 TOW and technicians from Bell Helicopters and Hughes Aircraft Corporation. It deployed in the Central Highlands, where it commenced gunnery training. From May 2, the team made daily flights in search of enemy armor, with the missiles mounted in the XM26 three-tube launcher. On May 9, PAVN armored units attacked Ben Het Camp; the TOW team destroyed 3 PT-76s and broke up the attack.

On May 26, the PAVN made another attempt to retake the city of Kontum. TOW aircraft were brought in at first light and found PAVN tanks moving almost at will through portions of the city. Conventional air strikes would have been risky for friendly forces, and the TOW proved to be ideal for picking off enemy tanks. At the end of the first day, the two TOW helicopters had destroyed 9 tanks and damaged one more. Four destroyed and one damaged were PT-76s.

==== Indian service ====
The PT-76 ''Pippa" (meaning an empty container which floats on water referring to its role as an amphibious tank) saw action with Indian forces in the Indo-Pakistani War of 1965 and 1971. The tactics of the Indian Army enabled the PT-76 to play a vital role in the Eastern theater of the 1971 war where the PT-76s proved superior to the obsolete Pakistani M24 Chaffee light tanks despite being outnumbered. A good example of such an engagement was the Battle of Garibpur, where an Indian Army Infantry Battalion with only 14 PT-76s was able to maul a much larger brigade-strength unit of Pakistani armor and inflict heavy casualties.

During the battle 8 Pakistani M24 Chaffee tanks were destroyed, 3 captured at the cost of 2 PT-76.

==== Other combat ====
The PT-76 also saw service in the Six-Day War (1967) during which the Israeli army destroyed or captured a few PT-76 tanks. During the Yom Kippur War in 1973 PT-76s were used during the crossing of the Great Bitter Lake by the Egyptian 130th Marines Brigade.

The People's Armed Forces of Liberation of Angola (FAPLA) deployed PT-76s during the Angolan Civil War, as did Cuba during its lengthy military intervention in that country. One FAPLA PT-76 was destroyed by a South African Ratel-90 armoured car during Operation Moduler. At least six others were captured by South African expeditionary forces over the course of that conflict.

During the Yugoslav wars, the PT-76 served with the Yugoslav People's Army and later the army of the Krajina Serbs in a few battles during the Ten-Day War in Slovenia (1991) and Croatian War of Independence (1991–1995).

The Indonesian Marine Corps used its PT-76Bs on the Indonesian island of Ambon during Maluku sectarian conflict in 1999-2003, and also in mid 1970s during Operation Lotus (Operasi Seroja).

=== List of conflicts ===
- 1956 Soviet invasion of Hungary (Soviet Union)
- 1959–1975 Vietnam War (North Vietnam)
- 1960–1975 Laotian Civil War (North Vietnam, Kingdom of Laos)
- 1964-1965 Operation Dwikora (Indonesia)
- 1965 Indo-Pakistani War of 1965 (India)
- 1966–1990 South African Border War
- 1967 Six-Day War (Egypt, Syria)
- 1968 Warsaw Pact invasion of Czechoslovakia
- 1970-1975 Cambodian Civil War (North Vietnam)
- 1971 Indo-Pakistani War of 1971 (India)
- 1973 Yom Kippur War (Egypt, Syria)
- 1975 Operation Seroja (Indonesia)
- 1975–2002 Angolan Civil War
- 1978-1991 Cambodian–Vietnamese War (Vietnam)
- 1980–1988 Iran–Iraq War (Iraq)
- 1990–1991 Gulf War (Iraq)
- 1991–2001 Yugoslav wars
  - 1991 Ten-Day War
  - 1991–1995 Croatian War of Independence
  - 1992–1995 Bosnian war
- 1999– Second Chechen War (Russia)
- 2000 Maluku sectarian conflict on the Indonesian island of Ambon
- 2003–2004 Indonesian offensive in Aceh
- 2003– Second Persian Gulf War
  - 2003 2003 invasion of Iraq

== Variants ==
=== Soviet Union ===
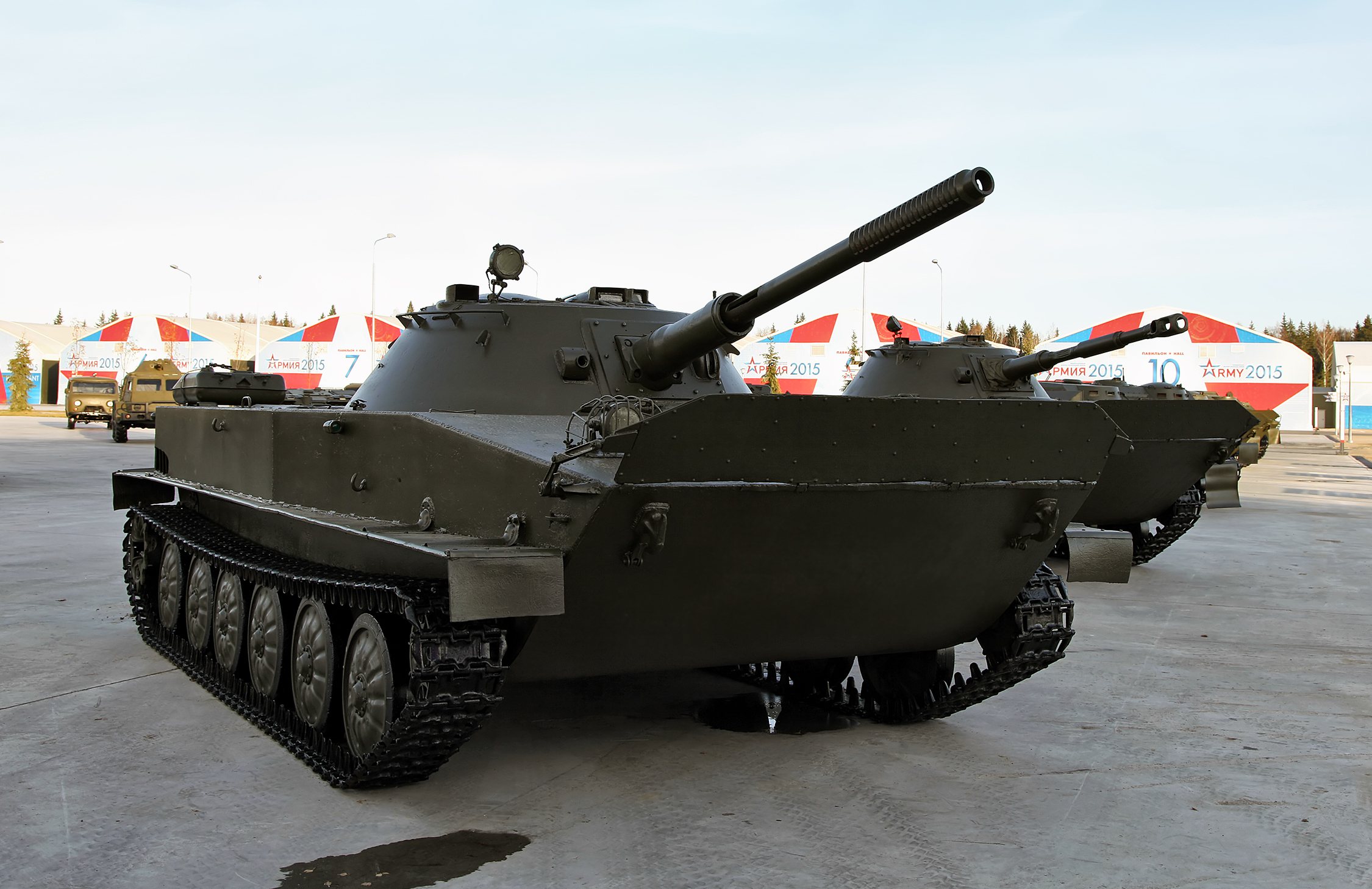
PT-76 (Ob'yekt 740 obr. 1951) on display at Park Patriot, 2015.

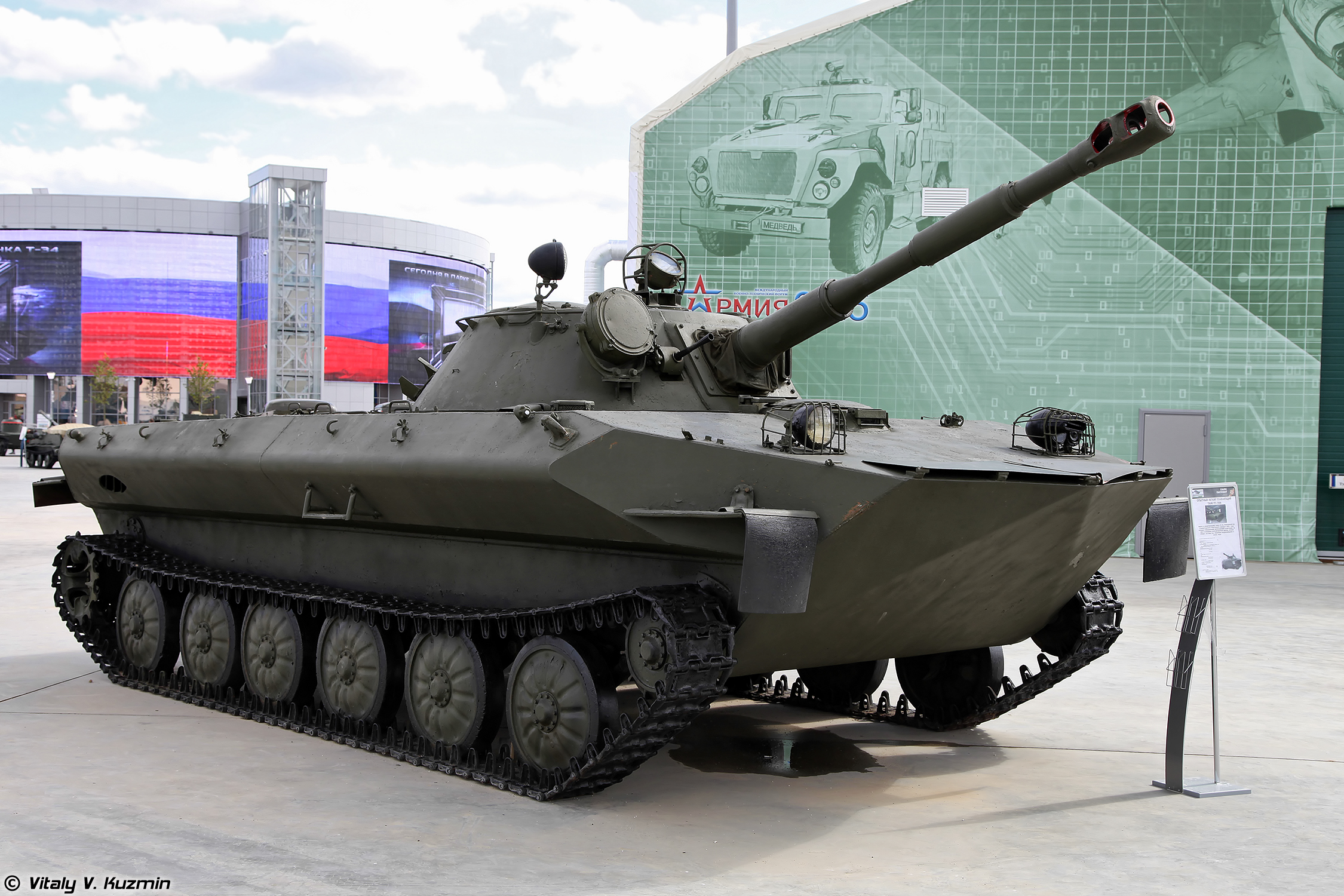
PT-76M (Ob'yekt 740M) on display at Park Patriot, 2015.

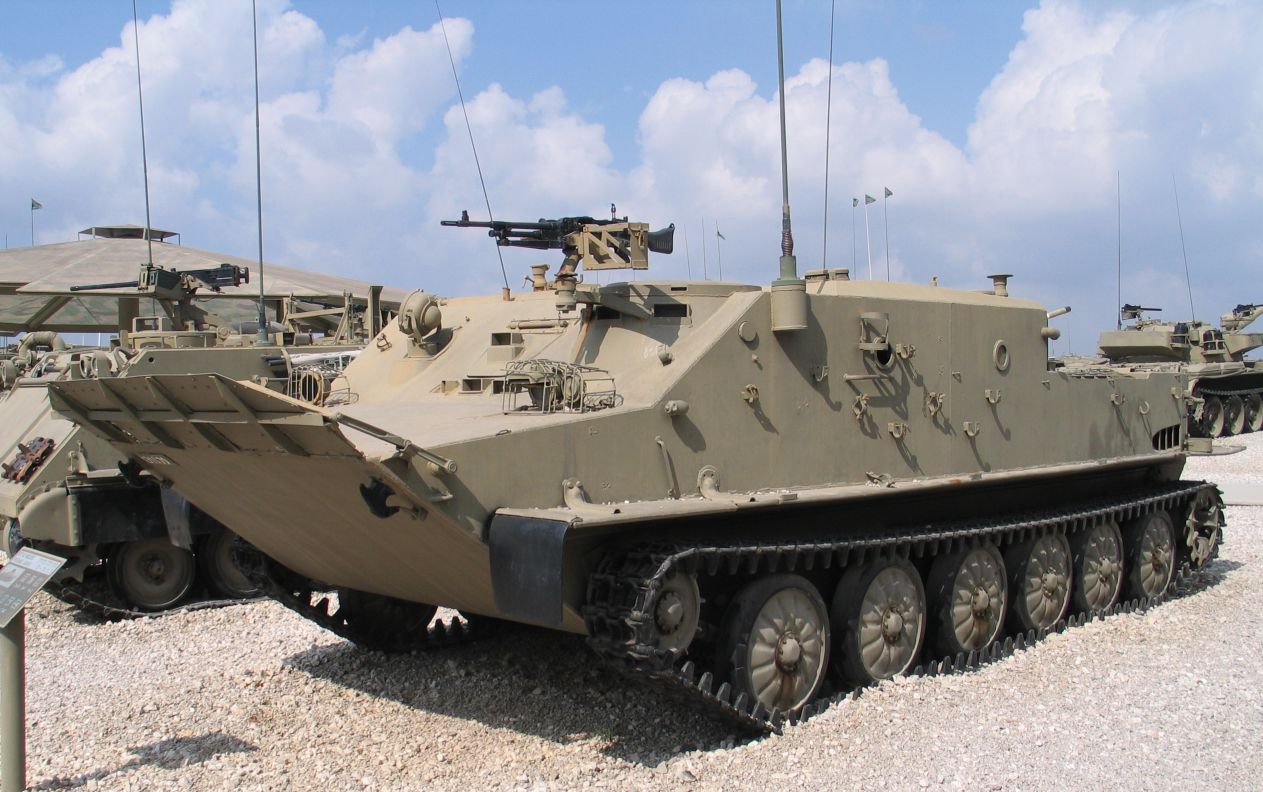
Ex-Syrian or ex-Egyptian BTR-50PK APC in Yad la-Shiryon Museum, Israel, 2005.

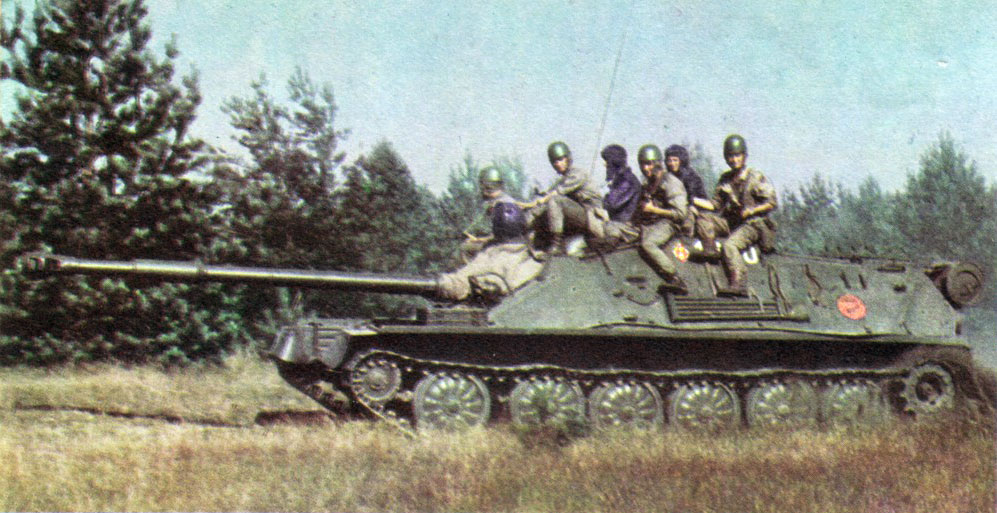
ASU-85 airborne self-propelled gun.

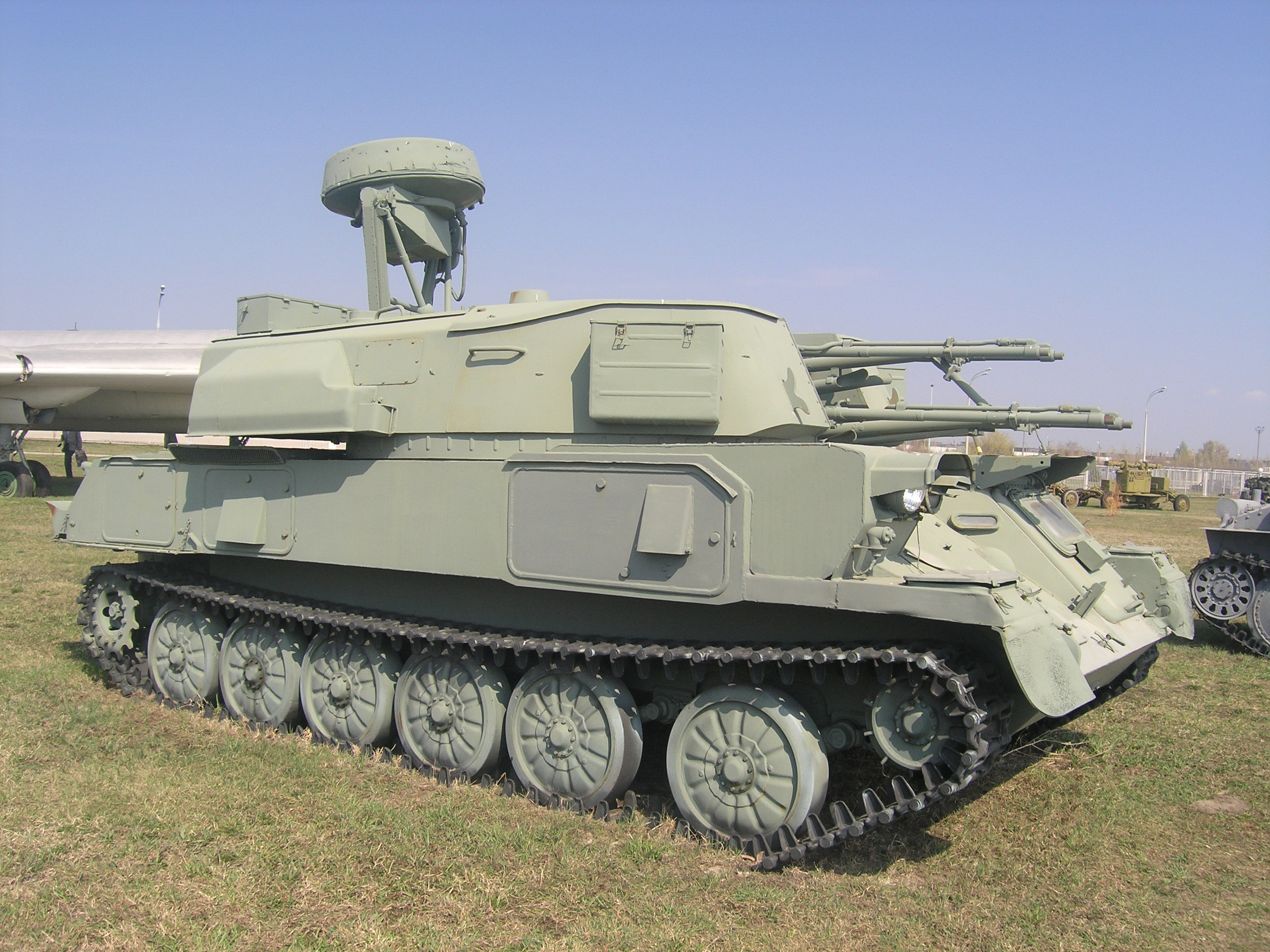
ZSU-23-4 self-propelled antiaircraft gun. It is based on the GM-575 chassis.

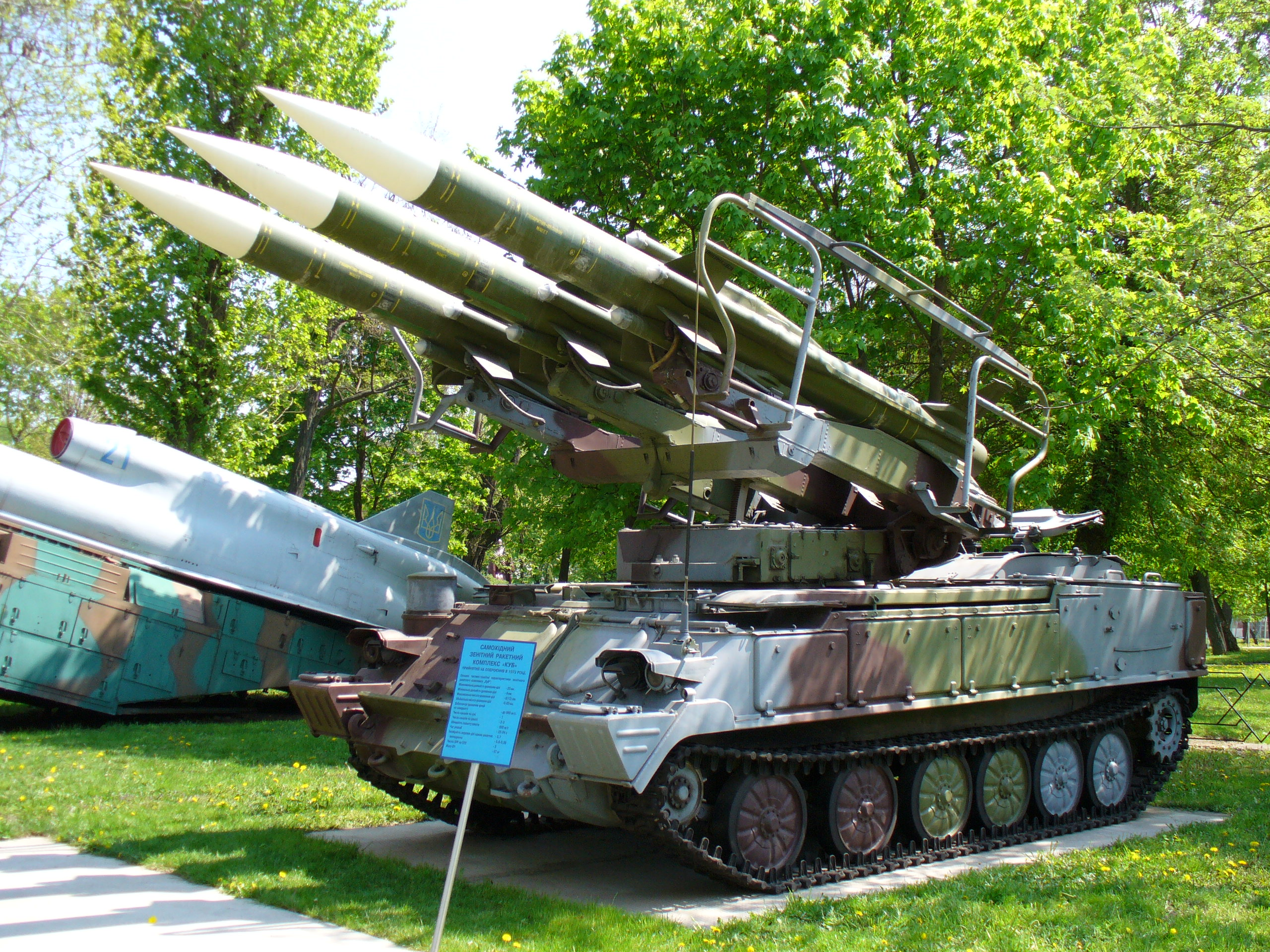
2P25 launch vehicle of the 2K12 Kub SAM system. It is based on the GM-578 chassis.

- PT-76 (Ob'yekt 740, 1951) – An original PT-76 armed with the D-56T 76.2 mm rifled tank gun (no bore evacuator, long multi-slotted muzzle brake, no fume extractor). It was produced between 1951 and 1957.

- PT-76 (Ob'yekt 740, 1957) – PT-76 armed with the D-56TM 76.2 mm rifled tank gun (double-baffle muzzle brake, bore evacuator, fume extractor) and a height of the hull was increased by 13 cm. It has night vision driver device TVN-2B, new headlamps, a new R-113 radio instead of the old 10-RT-26E set (it was later replaced by the R-123) and TDA thermo smoke generating system. It also has a spotlight fitted to a bracket on the right-hand edge of the turret roof. This version is sometimes called "PT-76B" in western sources.
- PT-76B (Ob'yekt 740B, 1959) – PT-76 armed with the D-56TS 76.2 mm rifled tank gun (double-baffle muzzle brake, cartridge ejector, fume extractor and STP-2P 'Zarya' 2-axis stabilization system), the PAZ (protivo-atomnaya zashchita) NBC protection system, an automatic fire extinguishing system, improved TShK-2-66 sight, a filtration-ventilation system, improved observation devices, improved electric equipment, a new V-6B 6-cylinder 4-stroke in line water-cooled diesel engine developing 263 hp (196 kW) at 1800 rpm and additional internal fuel tanks for which the shape of the armour had to be slightly changed. These additional internal fuel tanks increased the fuel capacity from 250 L to 400 L. The new engine is the same as that used in one bank of that fitted to the T-54. With the new engine and additional fuel tanks, the range of the vehicle has been increased to 480 km on the road, (590 km with external fuel tanks) and 120 km on the water. The 76.2 mm D-56TS rifled tank gun can fire a new undercaliber AP projectile piercing up to 75 mm at 60° from 2,000 meters. One such round has been added to a PT-76B typical ammunition load and so it can now carry 41 rounds. It was produced between 1959–1967.
  - PT-71 (Not to be confused with the Israeli PT-71) – is a PT-76B fitted with 9M14 "Malyutka" (NATO code: AT-3 Sagger) anti-tank guided missile pack mounted on the rear of the turret. It didn't reach operational stage, and the name is not official.
- PT-76A – A designator for different PT-76 and PT-76B models armed with the DShK 1938/46 12.7 mm antiaircraft heavy machine gun on a rotatable mount on top of the turret.
- PT-76K – Command version with an additional antenna on the right hand side of the turret and a generator at the rear of the deck.

- PT-76M (Ob'yekt 740M) – PT-76 with improved amphibious features thanks to slightly larger displacement. This variant was developed for the Russian Naval Marines but was not adopted because it did not have improved combat features. Instead the Marines adopted the PT-76B (with a snorkel).
- PT-85 (Not to be confused with Ob'yekt 906 or North Korean Type 82) – A PT-76 with a cast turret and an 85 mm gun. It was used during the Invasion of Czechoslovakia.

- PT-85 (Ob'yekt 906) (Not to be confused with PT-85 with a cast turret or North Korean Type 82) – Based on the chassis of the PT-76, armed with 85 mm D-58 tank gun, two prototypes were built.

- PT-90 (Ob'yekt 906) – Based on the chassis of the PT-76, armed with 90 mm D-62 tank gun, only at technical design stage.

- Ob'yekt 280 – PT-76 fitted with a 16x130 mm multi barrel rocket launcher.
- PT-76RKh – PT-76 converted to a light amphibious NBC reconnaissance tank. It has a dome cupola and a flag marker at the rear.
- BTR-50P – amphibious tracked APC, based on the chassis of the PT-76.

- Ob'yekt 911 – experimental IFV, developed by the Gavalov design bureau. The Ob.911 had a tracked suspension but additionally 4 retractable wheels under the hull. The performance advantages of this wheel-cum-track design didn't prove themselves and was deemed too complex.

- Ob'yekt 914 – experimental IFV. This vehicle was developed in the early 1960s by a design team led by I. V. Gavalov at the Volgograd Tractor Works (VTZ) and the prototype was ready for trials in 1964. The Ob.914 was armed with two 7.62 mm PKT general-purpose machine guns mounted in the hull on either side of the driver. It had a crew of two and could transport up to eight fully equipped soldiers (two of whom operated the PKTs). Its combat weight was 14.4 tons. After a series of trials in 1964, the Ob.765 was selected to become the BMP-1 due mostly to the rear engine design which obliged the infantry to mount and dismount through the single door in the rear of the right hand side of the vehicle and roof hatches. It was also felt that the Ob.765 had a better overall layout.
- ASU-85 – airborne assault gun that uses components of the PT-76.
- SPU 2P2 (S-119A) – launch vehicle of the tactical missile system 2K1 "Mars" (S-122A) (FROG-2).
- TZM 2P3 (S-120A) – transloader vehicle of the tactical missile system 2K1 "Mars".
- SPU 2P16 (S-123A) – launch vehicle of the tactical missile system 2K6 "Luna" (S-125A) (FROG-3/5).
- TZM 2P17 (S-124A) – transloader vehicle of the tactical missile system 2K6 "Luna". This was only a prototype.
- GM-568 – Chassis used for the 1S91 guidance vehicle of 2K12 Kub surface-to-air missile system. It uses some elements from the PT-76 including the drive train and wheels. It is nearly identical to the GM-578 chassis.
- GM-575 – Chassis used for the ZSU-23-4 self-propelled anti-aircraft gun. It uses a number of components from PT-76.
- GM-578 – Chassis used for the 2P25 launch vehicle 2K12 Kub surface-to-air missile system. It uses some elements from the PT-76 including the drive train and wheels. It is nearly identical to the GM-568 chassis.
- GSP (Ob'yekt 55) or GSP-55 – This is a tracked self-propelled amphibious ferry. It consists of two non-interchangeable left and right half units with large outer pontoons. The units use many components of the PT-76, for instance parts of the suspension, the (modified) engine, the electrical system and the steering system. A GSP ferry could carry up to 52 tonnes and had a speed of 6 km/h.

=== Belarus ===
- PT-76M – An upgraded PT-76 with a UTD-20 engine developing 300 hp (224 kW), new steering and brake systems, designed by Minotor-Service in Minsk. A similar upgrade exists for the BTR-50 series.

=== China ===
- Type 60 – The Chinese obtained a few PT-76s in the 1950s and wanted to make an amphibious light tank of their own. Type 60 was the first design which turned out to be unsatisfactory due to its engine overheating. Further development of the design resulted in the Type 63 amphibious light tank, which has some similarities to the PT-76.

=== Czechoslovakia ===
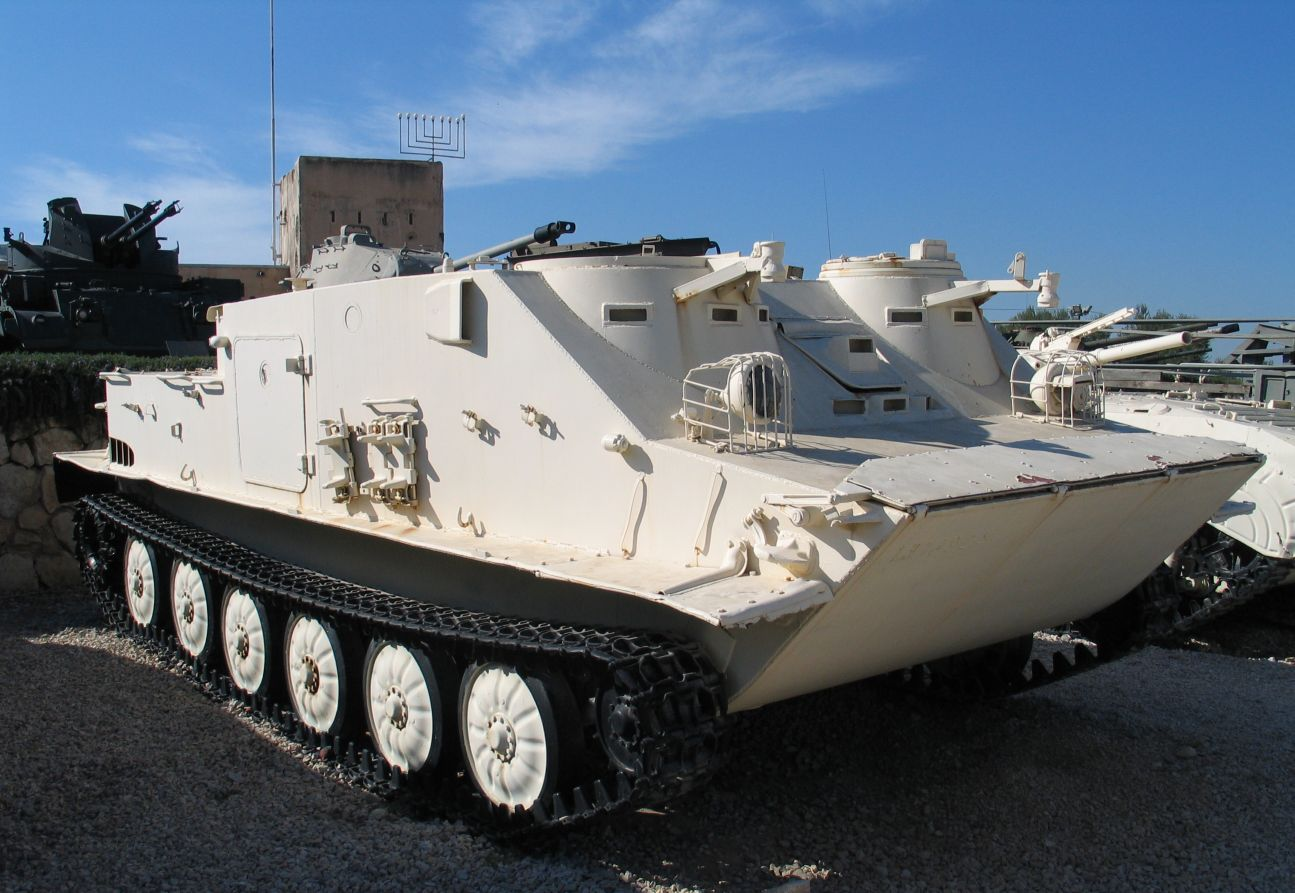
OT-62 TOPAS APC in Yad la-Shiryon Museum, Israel. 2005. Note the second bay and the side hatch.

- OT-62 TOPAS (OT-62 stands for Obrněný Transportér vzor 62 – "Armored Personnel Carrier model 62") ("TOPAS" stands for Transportér Obrněný PÁSový – "Tracked Armored Personnel Carrier") – A series of BTR-50 variants developed jointly by Poland and Czechoslovakia. They are similar to the BTR-50PK but have hatches in the hull sides, a more powerful PV-6 engine of 300 hp (224 kW) and two projecting bays like the BTR-50PU.

=== East Germany ===
- K1 – Command tank based on PT-76 Model 2s and PT-76Bs. It is equipped with an extra R-112 radio.

=== Indonesia ===
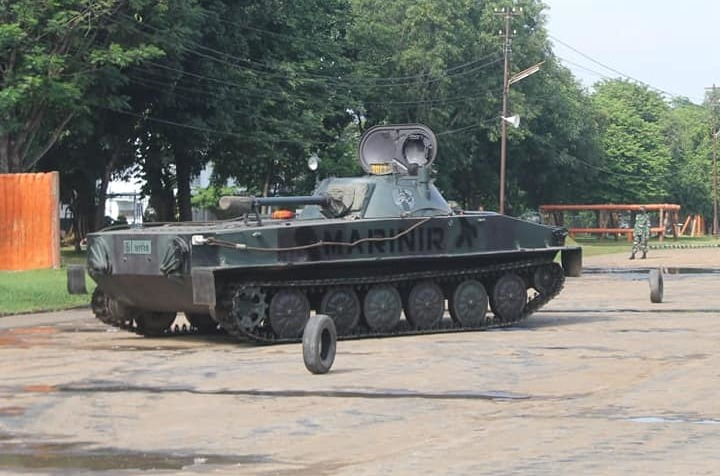
Indonesian PT-76(M)

- PT-76(M) – Indonesian Marines PT-76B modernized with PT-2000 upgrade package from Nimda, Israel in 1990s. Fitted with Cockerill Mk 3M-A2 90 mm gun (with multi-slot muzzle-brake), FN MAG as coaxial and pintle-mounted machine guns, a larger gunners sight and a new Detroit Diesel 6V92T engine.
  - PT-76(M) – PT-76 used by the Indonesian Marines were upgraded by PT Lumindo Artha Sejati in May 2020. New Detroit Diesel 6V92T engine with 300 hp, Cockerill Mk 3M-A2 90 mm gun (with multi-slot muzzle-brake), new fire control system, new day/night sight, a laser rangefinder, and new gun stabilizer.
- PT-76(M) with LCTS 90 – Proposed upgrades by Ukrspetsexport in collaboration with PT Lumindo Artha Sejati in mid 2020. The original turret were replaced with John Cockerill LCTS 90MP turret, armed with Cockerill Mk 3M-A2 90 mm gun and equipped with autoloader. The upgrades also includes ability to launch Falarick 90 ATGM, new Cummins VT400 diesel engine and Allison transmission, installation of "Zaslon-L" active protection system, "Sintez" fire control system, "Bazalt" navigation system, Harris radios and other improvements.
- TAPIR (Tank Amphibi Peluncur Incendiary Rocket – "Amphibious Incendiary Rocket Launcher Tank") – One PT-76B was modified with the 17-tube 140 mm rocket launcher of the BM-14-17 installed on top of the turret and with the main gun removed. Modified by PT Also Putra Indonesia in 1995. The project was discontinued due to inadequate funding.

=== Israel ===
- PT-71 (Not to be confused with the Soviet PT-71) – Is a PT-76 upgrade built by Nimda Group Ltd., which includes a 90 mm Cockerill tank gun, a new machine gun, a new fire control system, a laser range finder, night vision devices and a 300 hp (224 kW) Detroit Diesel 6V71T diesel engine. The only known customers were the Israeli and Indonesian armies.

=== North Korea ===
- PT-85 (Type 82) (Not to be confused with Ob'yekt 906 or PT-85 with a cast turret) – North Korea developed their own vehicle based partly on the PT-76.

=== Poland ===
- PT-76 with additional 12.7 mm DShK 1938/46 antiaircraft heavy machine gun on a rotatable mount and separate hatches for the commander and loader.
- PT-76 with additional periscopes fitted on the right of the turret roof.
- PT-76 without the muzzle brake.
- PT-76B with additional 12.7 mm DShK 1938/46 antiaircraft heavy machine gun on a rotatable mount and separate hatches for commander and loader.
- OT-62 TOPAS (OT-62 stands for Obrněný Transportér vzor 62 – "Armoured Personnel Carrier model 62") ("TOPAS" stands for Transportér Obrněný PÁSový – "Tracked Armoured Personnel Carrier") – Series of BTR-50 variants developed jointly by Poland and Czechoslovakia. They are similar to the BTR-50PK but have hatches in the hull sides, a more powerful PV-6 engine with 300 hp (224 kW) and two projecting bays like the BTR-50PU.
- WPT-76 – FROG launch vehicle 2P16 converted into a technical support vehicle (Polish: Wóz Pogotowia Technicznego).

=== Russia ===
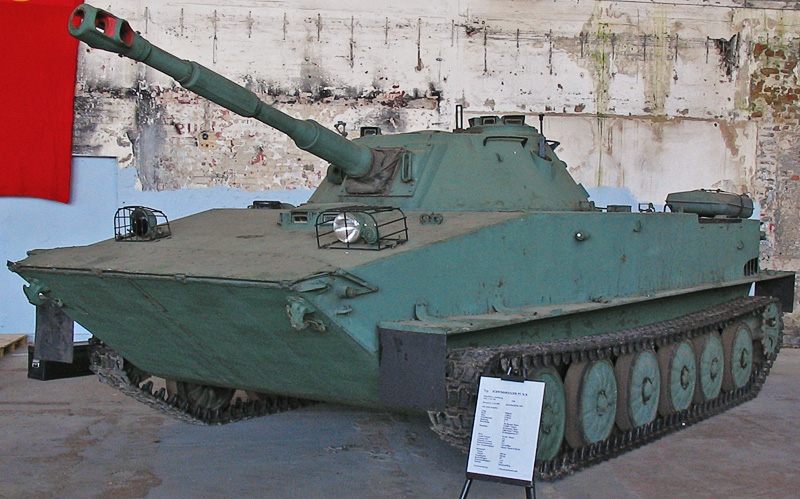
PT-76B amphibious light tank.

- PT-76B fitted with a new V-6M diesel engine developing 300 hp (224 kW) which increased the maximum road speed from 44 km/h to 45 km/h and the maximum swimming speed from 10,2 km/h to 11,2 km/h. This increased the power-to-weight ratio from 17.1 hp/tonne (12.3 kW/tonne) to 19.5 hp/tonne (14.5 kW/tonne).
- PT-76E (PT-76-57) – This is the most recent PT-76 modernization program. It increases the vehicle's battle efficiency by including a radical growth in firepower, which required a new BM-57 turret and other weapons. This variant is armed with a 57 mm AU-220M autocannon (which is based on the 57 mm L/76.6 S-60 AA gun). It was developed by CB Burevestnik (Nizhniy Novgorod). Its armor-piercing tracer rounds fired from 1,120 m can penetrate 100 mm of steel armor. The new weapon can destroy most modern APCs and IFVs. It can also engage aerial targets out to 6 km. The autocannon uses two types of ammunition, splinter-tracer and armor-piercing-tracer. However, it is possible to fire a special zenith shell. The gun can fire single shots, short bursts (2 to 5 rounds), or long bursts (up to 20 rounds). It can also fire continuously up to 120 rounds per minute. This system functions by using the energy generated by each round, not by using an external power source. Firepower is improved 5.5 times in the PT-76E over the PT-76B. The PT-76E is fitted with a more powerful UTD-20 6-cylinder 4-stroke V-shaped airless-injection water-cooled multifuel 15.8-litre diesel engine. It develops 300 hp (224 kW) at 2,600 rpm and is taken from the BMP-1 as is the transmission. The power-to-weight ratio has been improved to 20 horsepower (15 kW) per ton. This also increases the maximum road speed from 44 km/h to 60 km/h, with an average cross country speed from 32 km/h to 42 km/h. Other engine options are the UTD-23 or V-6BF. The vehicle has new tracks. Driver fatigue has been reduced. The vehicle's survivability on the battlefield is improved with the introduction of a new fast-acting firefighting system. The vehicle also has improvements in fire control and optical equipment, for instance the new sights 1P67 and "Liga-S". This modernization program increases the PT-76's performance by 2.7 times, which is still comparatively low. The vehicle was accepted by the Russian marines in 2006 and about 40 or 50 vehicles were ordered.

=== United States ===
- The PT-76 was used by the US Army for OpFor training. They were modified in a number of ways including the replacement of the engine with a Caterpillar diesel engine, changing the turret hatch to a rear hinged arrangement and the fitting of US radios and antennae mounts. Due to the new engines different exhaust arrangements, the exhausts were rerouted to use the water-jet ports rather than the original engine exhaust.

=== Vietnam ===
- PT-76 fitted with an anti-aircraft machine gun on top of the turret.
- T-1 is a modernised variant, newly produced light tank featuring a redesigned turret armed with a 76 mm main gun equipped with an autoloader, alongside a Soft-Kill APS and a commander’s panoramic sight integrated with a 12.7 mm RCWS. Performance is further enhanced by a modernized engine delivering a maximum output of 470 hp, while the chassis has been elongated to accommodate seven road wheels.

== Operators ==
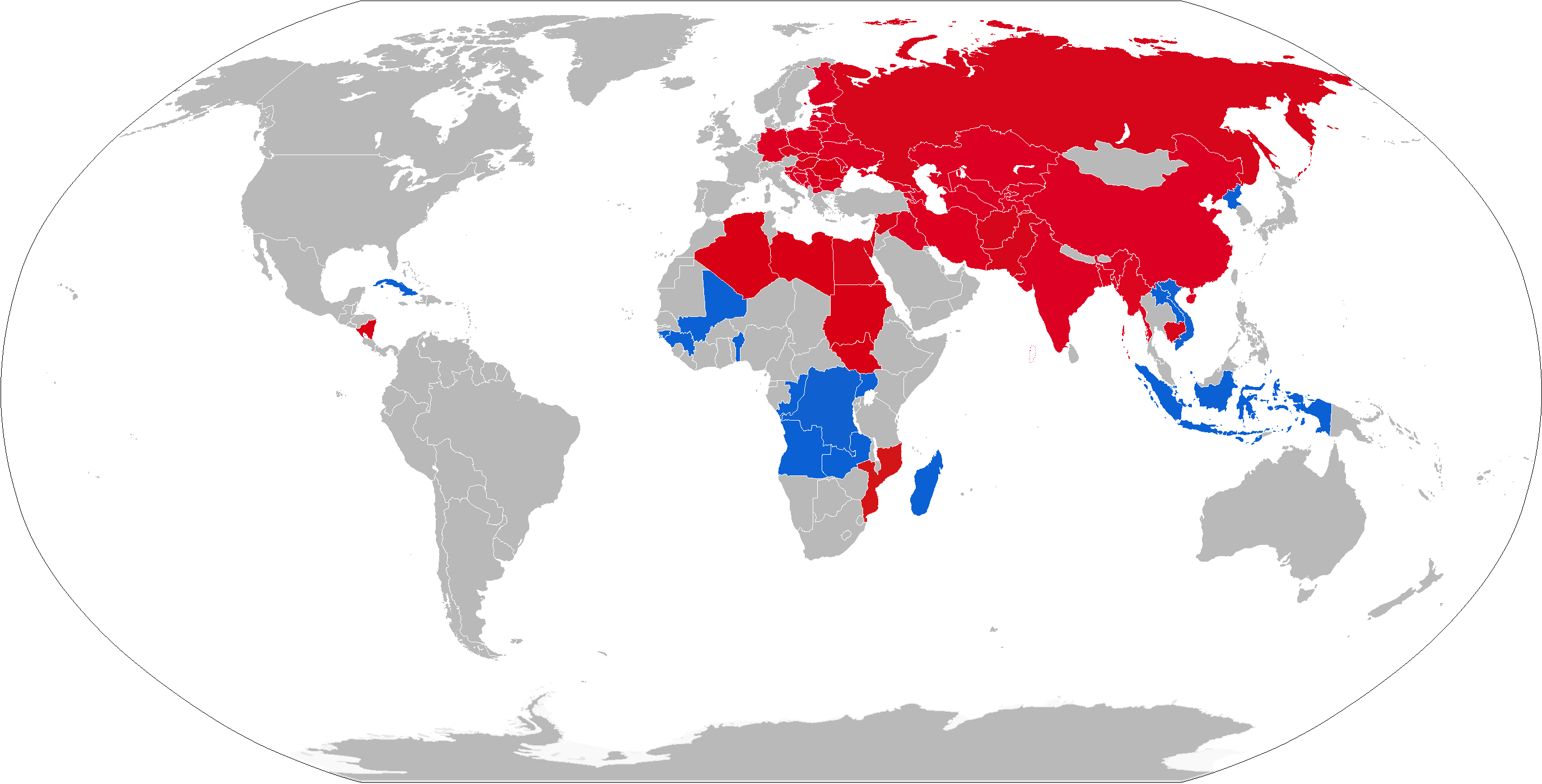
Operators Current Former

=== Current operators ===
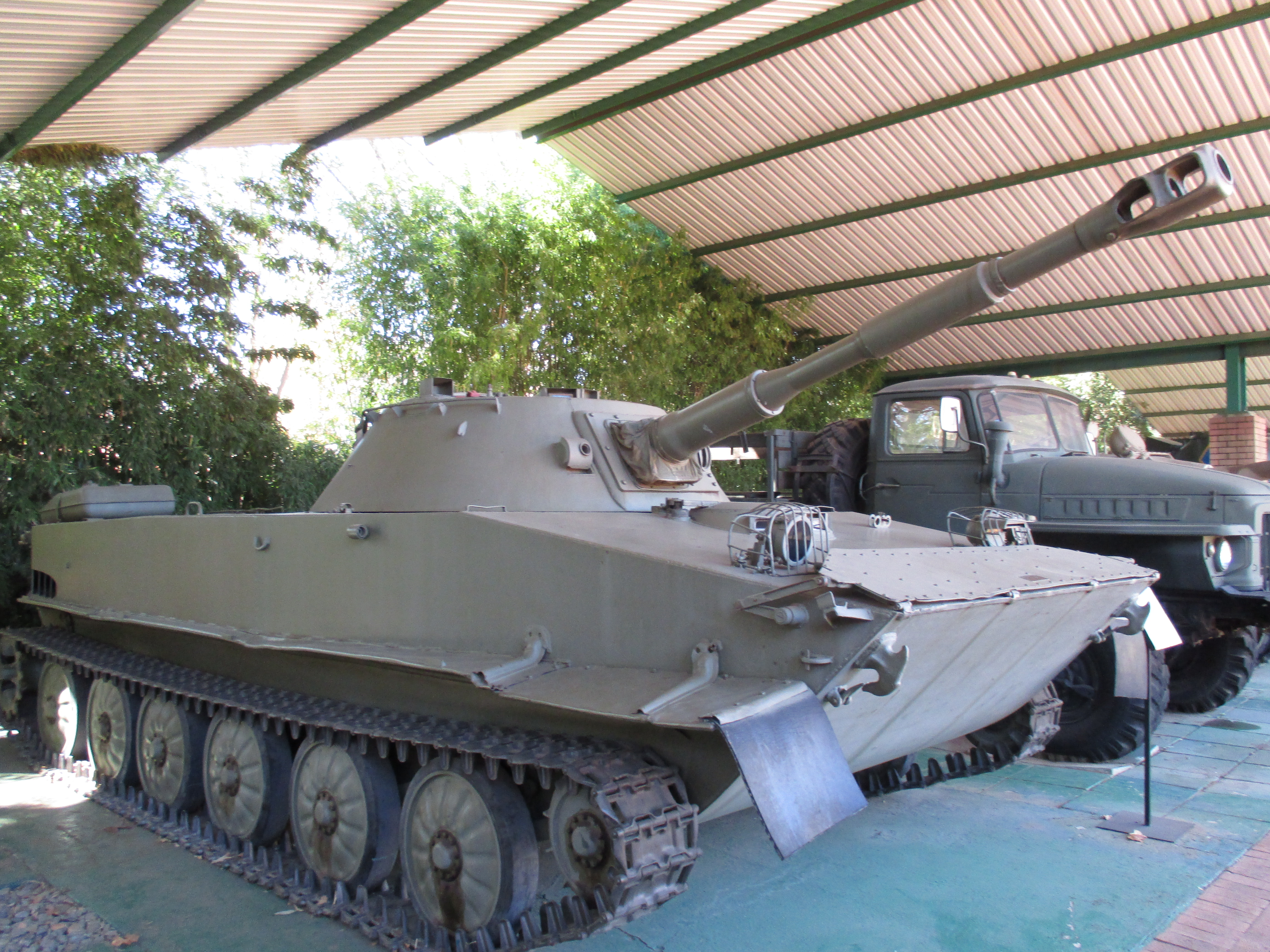
Captured Angolan PT-76 at the South African National Museum of Military History, Johannesburg.

- Angola – 68 ordered in 1975 from the Soviet Union and delivered in 1975 (the vehicles were previously in Soviet service). 12 were in service in 1996. 10 in service as of 2023
- Benin – 20 ordered in 1981 from the Soviet Union and delivered in 1982 (the vehicles were second hand). 20 in service in 1996. 18 in service as of 2023
- Cuba – 60 bought in 1970 from the Soviet Union and delivered between 1971 and 1973 50 in service with the marines in 1996. Unknown amount still in service as of 2023
- Democratic Republic of the Congo - 10 in service as of 2023
- Guinea – 20 ordered in 1977 from the Soviet Union and delivered in 1977 (the vehicles were second hand). 18 in service in 1996. 15 in service as of 2023
- Guinea-Bissau – 20 ordered in 1977 from the Soviet Union and delivered in 1978 (the vehicles were second hand). 15 in service as of 2023
- Indonesia – 50 PT-76Bs ordered in 1962 from the Soviet Union and delivered in 1964. 60 PT-76Bs were in service in 1996. 70 in service as of 2023
- Laos – 30 were in service in 1996. 10 in service as of 2023
- Madagascar – 12 ordered in 1983 from the Soviet Union and delivered in 1983 (the vehicles were previously in Soviet service). All remain in service as of 2023
- Mali – 2 PT-76 as of 2023
- North Korea – 100 ordered in 1965 from the Soviet Union and delivered between 1966 and 1967. 300 in service in 1996. 560 PT-76s and locally made PT-85s as of 2023
- Republic of the Congo – 3 ordered in 1971 from the Soviet Union and delivered in 1972 (the vehicles were second hand). they all remain in service as of 2023
- Uganda – 50 ordered in 1973 from the Soviet Union and delivered between 1974 and 1975 (the vehicles were possibly previously in Soviet service). 20 in service as of 2023
- Vietnam – aid by the Soviet Union: 1961 - 1975 period: ~200, including 10 PT-76B variant; 1979 - 1990 period: 140, including 95 PT-76B variant. 300 in service as of 2023
- Zambia – 50 ordered in 1983 from the Soviet Union and delivered in 1984 (the vehicles were previously in Soviet service). 30 in service as of 2023

=== Former operators ===
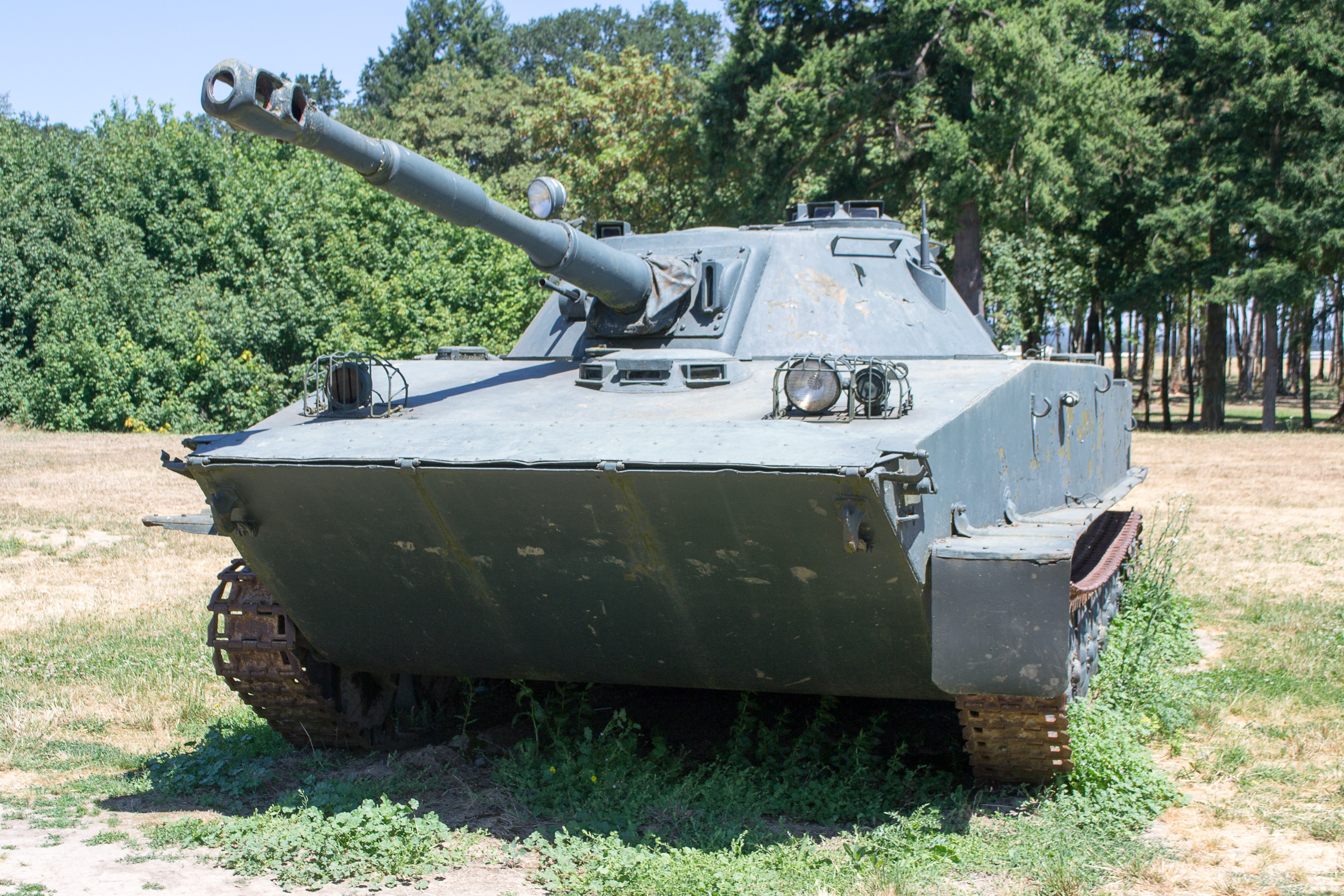
A PT-76 at the Evergreen Aviation & Space Museum.

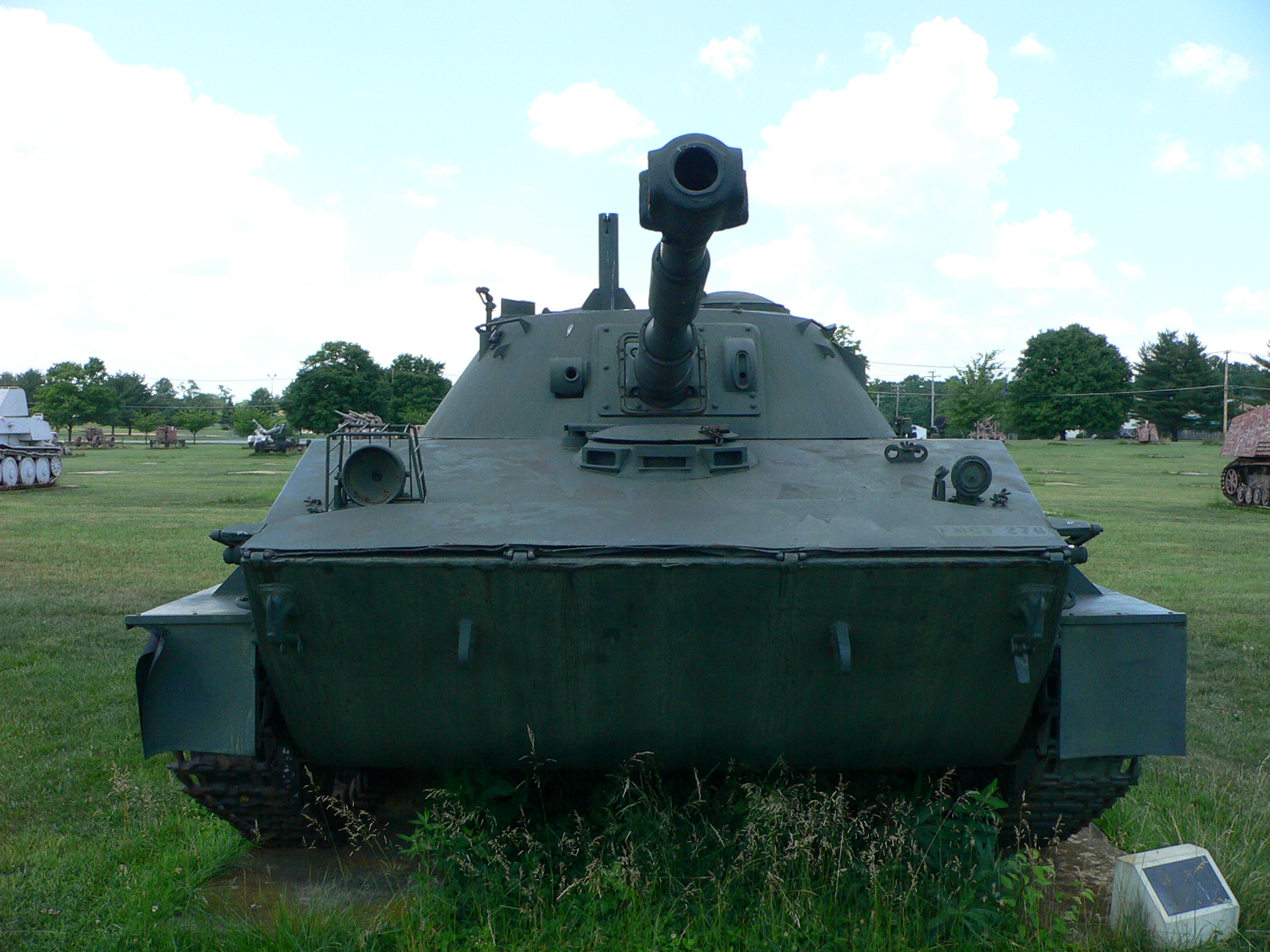
PT-76 at the United States Army Ordnance Museum (Aberdeen Proving Ground, Maryland) on June 12, 2007.

- Afghanistan – 50 ordered in 1958 from the Soviet Union and delivered between 1959 and 1961. 60 in service in 1996
- Belarus – 8 in service in 1995
- Bosnia and Herzegovina − 8 in service in 2005
- Bulgaria – 250 ordered in 1959 from the Soviet Union and delivered between 1960 and 1964. Withdrawn from service
- Cambodia – 10 ordered in 1983 from the Soviet Union and delivered in 1983 as military aid; More 10 were ordered in 1988 from the Soviet Union and delivered in 1989 as aid (all vehicles were previously in Soviet service) 10 in service in 2005
- China – Designed a copy of the PT-76, known as the Type 60 but it proved to be unsatisfactory and was replaced by a Chinese design, the Type 63
- Croatia – 1 in service in 1998 and 9 in 2003. All were captured from JNA. Scrapped
- Egypt – 50 ordered in 1965 from the Soviet Union and delivered in 1966. 200 ordered in 1970 from the Soviet Union and delivered between 1970 and 1972 (the vehicles were probably previously in Soviet service)
- Finland – 12 ordered from the Soviet Union and delivered in 1964. Withdrawn in 1994. Some converted to PT-A driver training vehicles (without cannon) for BTR-50. Withdrawn in 2001
- East Germany – 170 ordered in 1956 from the Soviet Union and delivered between 1957 and 1959. PT-76 Model 2 and PT-76B, passed on to the unified German state.
- Germany – PT-76 Model 2 and PT-76B, taken from the GDR's army. All were scrapped or sold to other countries
- Hungary – 100 ordered in 1957 from the Soviet Union and delivered between 1959 and 1960
- India – 178 ordered in 1962 from the Soviet Union and delivered between 1964 and 1965. 90 in service in 2005. Retired in 2009
- Iraq – 45 ordered in 1967 from the Soviet Union and delivered between 1968 and 1970 (the vehicles were probably previously in Soviet service). 200 ordered in 1983 from the Soviet Union and delivered in 1984 (the vehicles were previously in Soviet service). 100 prior to the 2003 invasion of Iraq. All destroyed or scrapped
- Kingdom of Laos – 45 delivered by the Soviet Union in 1961 and retired in 1964. Additional 25 captured from the North Vietnamese army (NVA) in 1969 and in service until 1970
- Nicaragua – 22 ordered in 1983 from the Soviet Union and delivered in 1984 (the vehicles were previously in Soviet service) 10 in storage as of 2023
- Mozambique – 16, some bought from the GDR after replacement through BMP-1 in 1973
- North Vietnam – 150 ordered in 1964 from the Soviet Union and delivered between 1959 and 1960 (aid, the vehicles were possibly previously in Soviet service). 100 ordered in 1971 from the Soviet Union and delivered between 1971 and 1972 (aid, the vehicles were possibly previously in Soviet service). Passed on to the unified Vietnam state
- Pakistan – 32 ordered in 1968 from Indonesia and delivered between 1969 and 1970 (the vehicles were second hand). Further 12 were captured during the Indo-Pakistani war of 1965
- Poland – 300 ordered in 1955 from the Soviet Union and delivered between 1957 and 1958. 30 in service in 1996
- Russia – 150 in 2010
- Slovenia – 8 used during the Ten-Day War, retired after
- Soviet Union – About 12,000 produced (about 10,000 for the Soviet Army and about 2,000 for export). 1,200 in service in 1990. Passed on to successor states.
- Syria – 80 ordered in 1971 from the Soviet Union and delivered between 1972 and 1973 (the vehicles were previously in Soviet service). 100 in service in 1996
- Ukraine – 40 inherited from the former Soviet Union. 5 in service in 1995
- United States – The US Army used a number of PT-76s in the OPFOR role for training
- Yugoslavia – 100 PT-76B ordered in 1962 from the Soviet Union and delivered 1963

=== Evaluation-only operators ===
- Czechoslovakia – Bought and evaluated one example, but, declined acceptance

== See also ==
- M551 Sheridan – US light tank of the Cold War.
- SU-100

== Literature ==
- International Institute for Strategic Studies (1995). The Military Balance 1995-1996. Oxford University Press. ISBN 978-0-19-828055-2.
- Grandolini, Albert (1998). Armor of the Vietnam War (2): Asian Forces. Hong Kong: Concord Publications. ISBN 978-9623616225.
- Baryatynski, Mikhail. "Plavayushchiy tank PT-76". Bronyekollektsia series (in Russian) (special issue 1(5)/2004).
- Foss, Christopher F. (2002). Jane's Tank & Combat Vehicle recognition guide. London: HarperCollins Publishers. ISBN 0-00-712759-6.
- Dunstan, Simon (1982). Vietnam Tracks-Armor In Battle (1982 ed.). Osprey Publishing. ISBN 0-89141-171-2.
- Haryadi, Yosafat Robert (2019). Sejarah Kavaleri Korps Marinir (in Indonesian). Surabaya: Penerbit Karunia. ISBN 978-979-9039-97-2.
- Starry, Donn A. (1978). Mounted Combat In Vietnam. Vietnam Studies. Department of the Army. CMH 90-17.
- Stockwell, David B. (1990). Tanks In The Wire. ISBN 0-515-10333-0. Account of the Battle of the US Special Forces camp at Lang Vei in 1968
- International Institute for Strategic Studies (February 2023). The Military Balance 2023. Routledge, Chapman & Hall, Incorporated. ISBN 978-1-032-50895-5.
- Zaloga, Steve (1979). Modern Soviet Armour: Combat Vehicles of the USSR and Warsaw Pact Today. Arms & Armour Press. ISBN 978-0-85368-173-1.
