= Tigr (military vehicle) =

Russian 4×4 multipurpose all-terrain infantry mobility vehicle

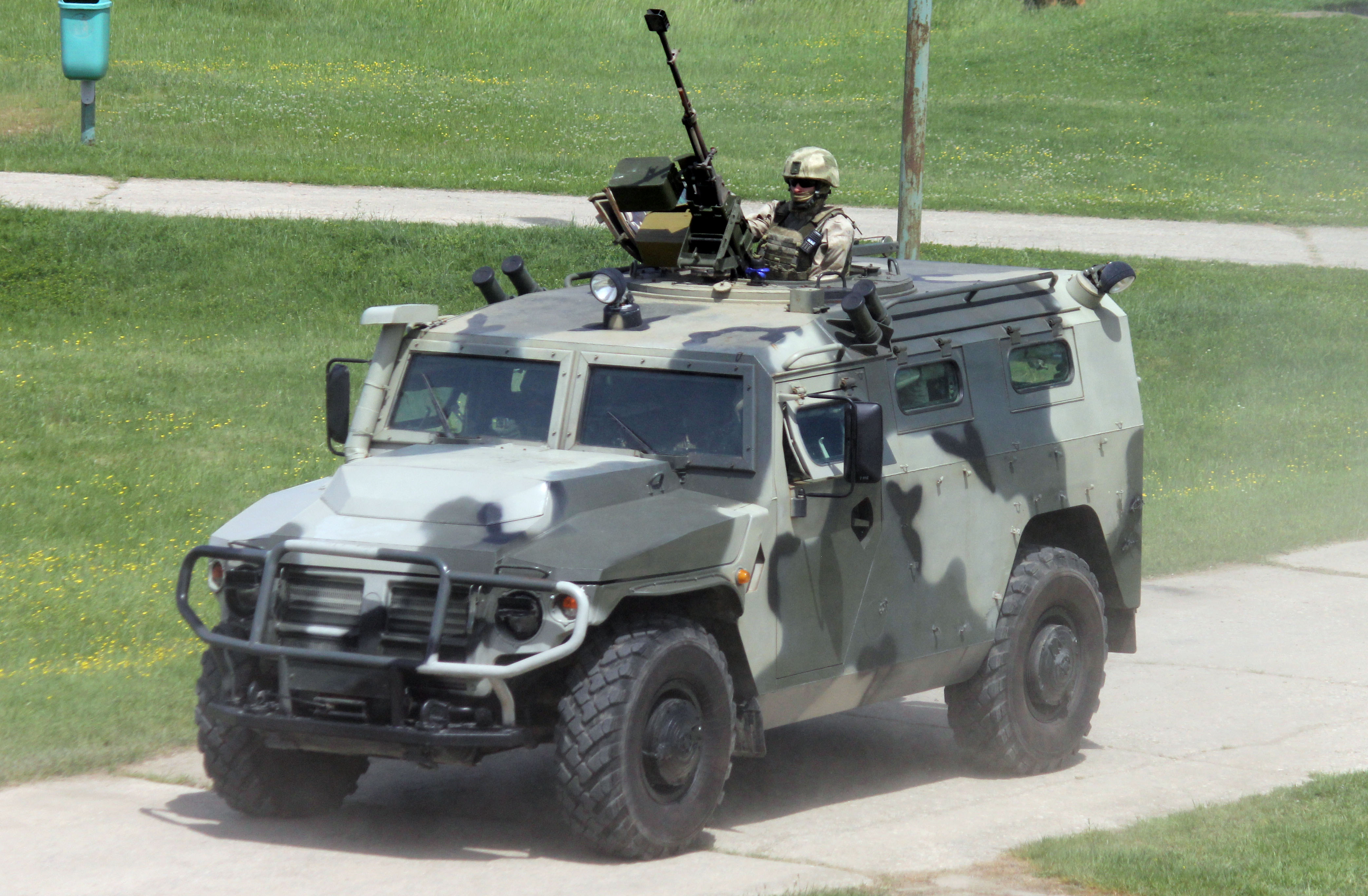
- A Tigr in Serbia being used by the 2nd Separate Special Purpose Brigade.
- Type: Infantry Mobility Vehicle
- Place of origin: Russia

Service history
- In service: 2005–present
- Used by: See Operators
- Wars: Syrian Civil War; Russian intervention in Syria; Russo-Ukrainian War; Annexation of Crimea; Russo-Ukrainian war

Production history
- Designer: Military Industrial Company, 2-door and 4-door truck, 3-door and 5-door station wagon
- Designed: 2001
- Manufacturer: Arzamas Machinery Plant and other plants across the country included ARZ plants (e.g. CARZ172) (Russia); Beijing Yanjing Motor Company (China); Minsk Wheel Tractors Plant (Belarus); Corvus Slovakia (Slovakia); STREIT Group (UAE)
- Unit cost: 160,000 USD (estimate)
- Produced: 2004–present (Russian production); 2008–present (Chinese production); 2017–present (Slovak production); 2018-present (Emirati production); Unknown–present (Belarusian production)
- Variants: See Variants

Specifications
- Mass: 7,200 kg (15,900 lb)
- Length: 5.67 m (18.6 ft); 5.7 m (19 ft) (Tigr-6A SPV); 5.7 m (19 ft) (Falcon)
- Width: 2.2 m (7.2 ft); 2.3 m (7.5 ft) (Tigr-6A SPV); 2.33 m (7.6 ft) (Falcon)
- Height: 2.0 m (6.6 ft); 2.2 m (7.2 ft) (Tigr-6A SPV); 2.4 m (7.9 ft) (Falcon)
- Crew: 2 + 9, 10, or 11 depending on variant 6 (Tigr-6A SPV)
- Armor: SPM-1: 5 mm (0.20 in); SPM-2: 7 mm (0.28 in)
- Main armament: 7.62mm PKP "Pecheneg" machine gun or Kord-12.7mm heavy machine gun or .50 Cal M2HB or 30mm AGS-17 grenade launcher
- Engine: YaMZ-5347-10 4.43 L 4 cylinder turbodiesel 215 hp (158 kW) Cummins 5.9 L (360 cu in) B180 TD 6cyl, 180 hp (130 kW); Cummins 5.9 L (360 cu in) B205 TD 6cyl, 180 hp (130 kW); Cummins 5.9 L (360 cu in) B-214 TD 6cyl 215 hp (160 kW); Yuchai YC V6 V-type six-cylinder diesel engine 300 hp (220 kW); Cummins ISB 6.7 litre diesel engine 385 hp (287 kW)
- Transmission: Allison LCT-1000 automatic Chrysler 545RFE automatic 5-speed manual (Yanjing models and Tigr-6A SPV)
- Operational range: 1,000 km (620 mi)
- Maximum speed: 140 km/h (87 mph) on road 80 km/h (50 mph) off-road

The Tigr (Russian: Тигр, lit. 'Tiger') is a Russian 4×4 multipurpose all-terrain infantry mobility vehicle manufactured by Military Industrial Company, first delivered to the Russian Army in 2006.

Primarily used by the Russian Armed Forces and Russian Ministry of Internal Affairs, it is also used by several other countries.

== History ==
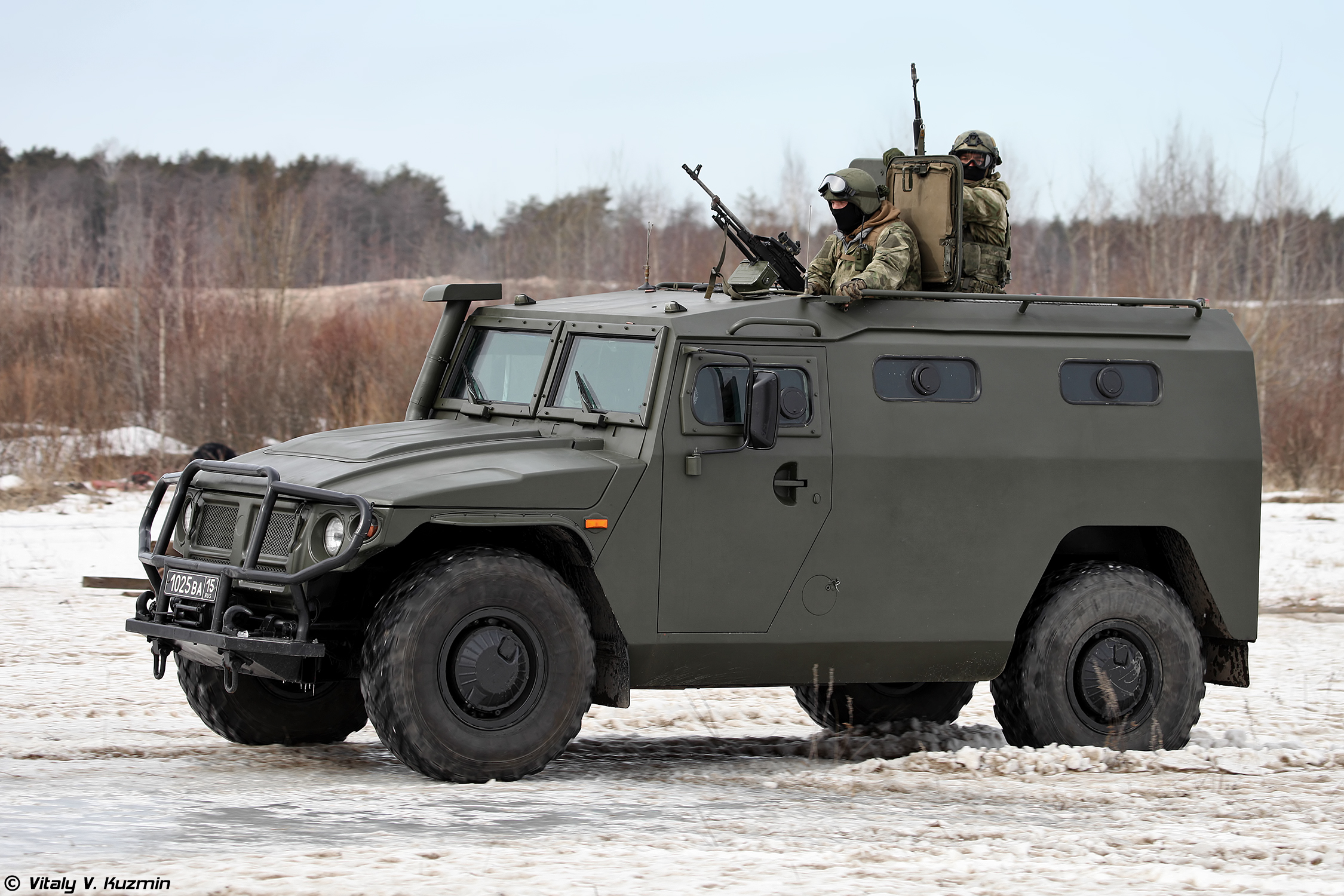
Tigr in service with the 604th Special Purpose Center of Internal troops.

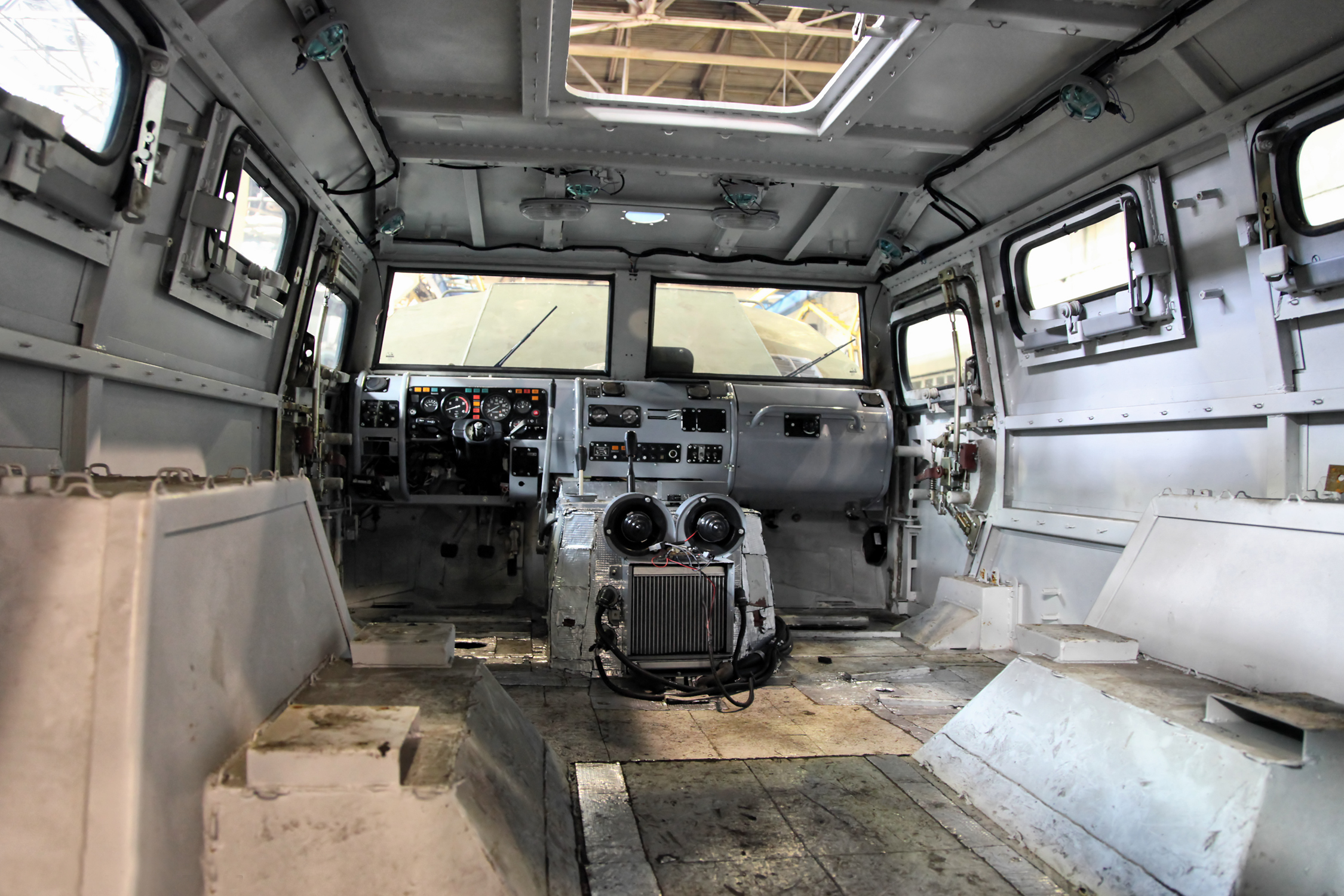
Tigr-M with unfinished interior on the assembly line

The Tigr was first shown at the IDEX exhibition in 2001. Pilot production started in 2004 with 96 vehicles. The Russian Army officially adopted the GAZ-2975 into service at the end of 2006. The vehicle was then officially manufactured in 2007.

China co-produced the Tigr with Russia after it initially refused to grant them a full license. One hundred ten Tigrs were delivered from 2008 to 2010 and are in service with the Chinese Public Security police. Some saw use publicly in the 2008 Beijing Olympics and in the 2009 Xinjiang riots.

Five Tigrs, fully assembled, were delivered with five more in kit form for assembly while 100 were assembled in China under Beijing Yanjing Motor Company. The contract was reported at the International Salon of Weapons and Military Equipment exhibition (MVSV-2008) in August 2008. Yanjing Motor-made vehicles are known as YJ2080C and YJ2081C, the differences are the engines installed and the weight.

During the 2010 Interpolitex exhibition, MIC presented the upgraded version of Tigr-the VPK-233114 Tigr-M-with a new YaMZ-534 diesel engine, additional armour and an NBC protection system. This new Tigr-M entered service with the Russian army during the first half of 2013. Mass production and the export version have already been launched with a 205 hp engine.

Tigr armoured cars were reported to be among the AFV's deployed by Russia during its annexation of Crimea.

In early March 2015, OSCE inspectors spotted "a camouflaged Tigr-type armoured personnel carrier" guarding a DPR Checkpoint, close to the village Shyrokyne east of Mariupol.

In 2011, "Rosoboronexport" has offered Azerbaijan to create a licensed production of armored vehicles on its territory.

Since 2015, Tigr vehicles are used by the Syrian Army in fight with opposition and extremist groups.

The Minsk Wheel Tractor Plant unveiled the Lis-PM (Fox-PM in English from Russian), a variant of the Tigr, in a public relations event on April 30, 2015. It's made from parts supplied from VPK-233136 Tigr kits. Parts made in Belarus are around 85 percent with plans to have the Lis-PM made with all the components made in Belarus. The vehicle was previously seen at the 7th International Exhibition of Armament and Military Equipment or MILEX-2014 event. They were then shown on May 9, 2015, in a Belarusian military parade.

BYMC announced on November 8, 2016, that an unnamed country has purchased 177 YJ2080s, winning its first export order.

In January 2017, Tigr-Ms entered service with the Russian Army mounting the Arbalet-DM remote weapon station (RWS). It can hold a Kord 12.7 mm machine gun carrying 150 rounds of ammunition or a PKTM 7.62 mm machine gun carrying 250 rounds. The module has TV and thermal imaging cameras allowing target identification out to 2.5 km and 1.5 km respectively, an integral laser rangefinder, and the ability to lock on and track targets. In the same month, Corvus Slovakia received their rights to manufacture and sell the Tigr.

In 2018, Streit Group has the rights to manufacture the Tigr as the Falcon, which debuted at the African Aerospace and Defence (AAD-2018) exhibition in September 2018.

As of May 2020, Tigr has been exported to 16 states and since 2005 over 2,000 vehicles have been built in various configurations and delivered to Russia and foreign countries. In July 2023, Russian Defense Minister Sergey Shoigu stated that the supplies of Tigr-M by Arzamas Machine-Building Plant had surged 2 times since early 2022.

During the 2022 Russian invasion of Ukraine, the Tigr was heavily used by the Russian forces. Some Tigrs used by the Russians in Ukraine are equipped with the Arbalet-DM RWS. Ukrainian forces have been using captured Tigrs. Tigrs with anti-drone systems were also unveiled at the 8th Russian military technical forum (Army 2022) event.

== Design ==
The vehicle was designed to transport troops and various equipment quickly on road and off-road. It has a chassis frame construction, with a traditional layout of front engine, middle crew compartment, and rear cargo area. Standard features include: power steering, independent all-wheel torsion suspension with hydraulic shock absorbers and stabilizer bars, a transfer case with a locking center differential, limited slip differentials, two-speed transfer case, automatic tire inflation, engine block heater, and electric winch.

The GAZ-233001 has optional air conditioning, stereo, electric windows, and an anti-lock braking system.

Armored versions of the Tigr feature 5 mm (0.20 in) (7 mm (0.28 in) for the SPM-2) heat-treated and stress-relieved armor plates. The Tigr can carry a half ton of cargo.

The available engines are a Cummins 5.9 L (360 cu in) B180 turbodiesel with 180 hp (130 kW); a Cummins 5.9 L (360 cu in) B205 turbodiesel producing 180 hp (130 kW); a Cummins 5.9 L (360 cu in) B-214 turbodiesel making 215 hp (160 kW); or a GAZ-562 3.2 L (200 cu in) turbodiesel with 197 hp (147 kW).

Designed for performance in mountain, arctic, and desert environments, the Tigr is capable of operating at ambient temperatures ranging from −14–50 °C (7–122 °F). Moreover, the vehicle has approach and departure angles of 52 degrees and a wading depth of 1.2 m (3.9 ft).

== Variants ==
=== Russian variants ===
The Tigr has been produced in multiple variants.

==== GAZ-2975 ====
- GAZ-2975-A prototype unarmored three-door station wagon sport utility vehicle
  - GAZ-29751 — 3—door wagon,
  - GAZ 29752 — 5-door wagon designed to carry four people and from 500 to 1000 kilograms of cargo,
  - GAZ-297533 — 2—door with tilt covered load platform.

==== GAZ-2330 ====
Standard unarmoured production variant

- GAZ-2330-Multipurpose unarmoured SUV, made in two and three-door versions
  - GAZ-23304-Multipurpose unarmoured five-door wagon with rear hinged doors
- GAZ-233001/GAZ-233011-Multipurpose unarmoured four-door pickup truck
- GAZ-233002/GAZ-233012-Multipurpose unarmoured two-door pickup truck
- GAZ-233003/GAZ-233013-Multipurpose unarmored three-door SUV with a sedan body with optional undivided/divided interior

==== Tigr-2 ====
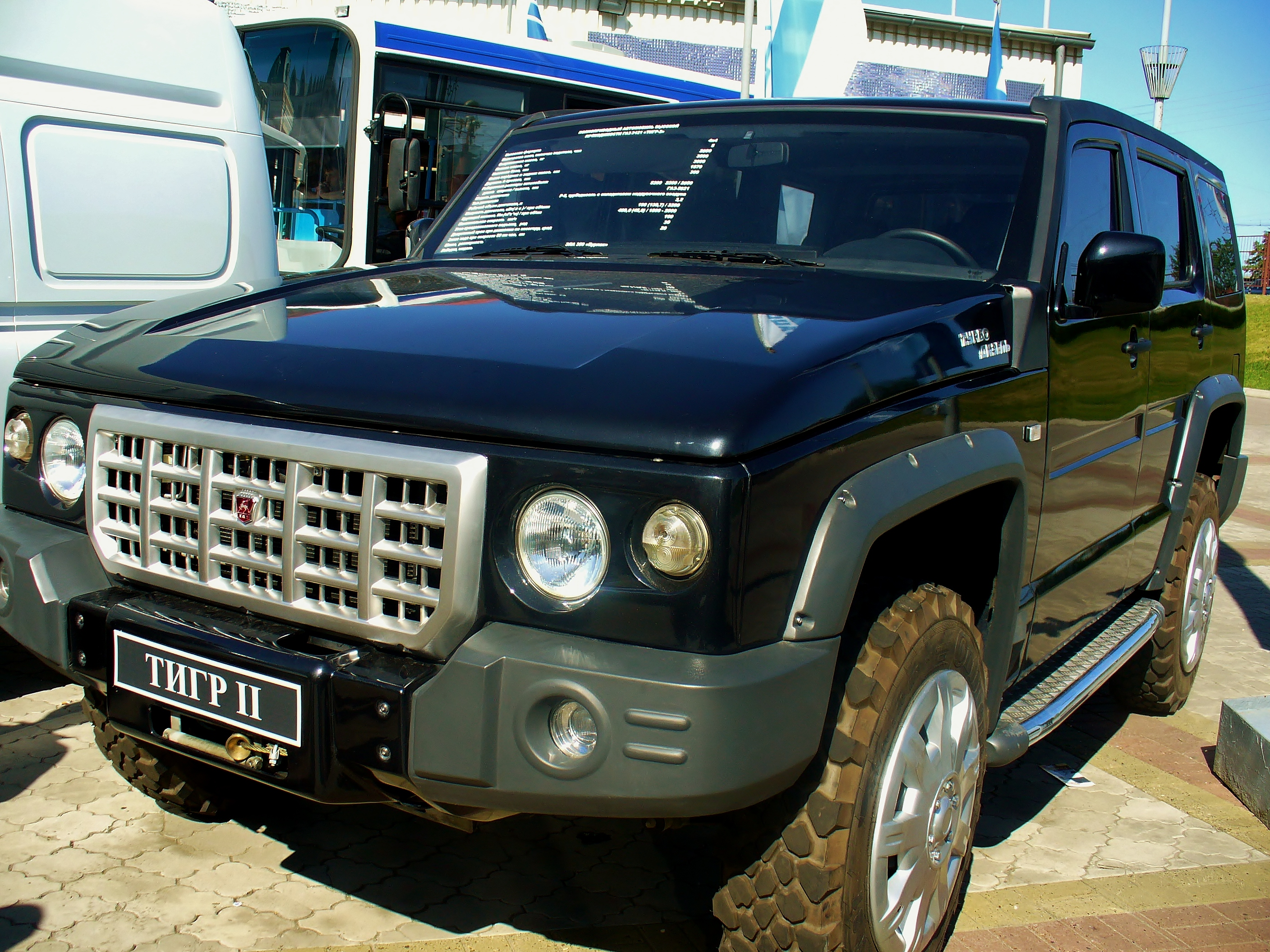
Tigr-2 at AUTOFORUM-2007 in Nizhny Novgorod

Tigr-2, an experimental rebodied civilian style SUV, was presented for the first time in September 2006 at the Moscow Motor Show in the exhibition "Russian cars". Released in a small series from 2008, mainstream sales at dealers were planned to start in 2009 with the car available in two trim levels-luxury and regular.

The standard SUV is mechanically very similar to the military Tigr. It is packaged with a Steyr turbodiesel with 190 hp (140 kW) or six-cylinder Cummins B205 with 205 hp (153 kW) and is designed for speeds of up to 160 km/h (99 mph).

With a weight of 3,500 kg (7,700 lb), the civilian Tigr-2 fuel consumption is 15 L/100 km. Its length is 5.7 m (19 ft), its width and height is 2.3 m (7.5 ft), and its ground clearance is 330 mm (1.08 ft). Compared with the military version, the civilian Tigr is 2,800 kg (6,200 lb) lighter. The price was planned at $270,000/17,600,000 rubles.

==== SP46 ====
In 2007, a ceremonial parade variant was designed, the СП46 (SP 46) ceremonial Tigr is a two-door convertible with a removable rigid roof. It features two seats in the front and one in the back, and is finished with modern luxury car appointments. This Tigr is equipped with an automatic Allison 1000 series transmission and Cummins B205 turbodiesel. Vehicle weight was reduced to 4,750 kg (10,470 lb), as this version is unarmoured.

In November 2008, a prototype of the parade Tigr was presented to the Minister of Defense Anatoly Serdyukov. Subsequently, three vehicles were ordered and used in the Victory Day parade on May 9, 2009, at the Palace Square in St. Petersburg and also at the 64th anniversary of Russia's World War II victory.

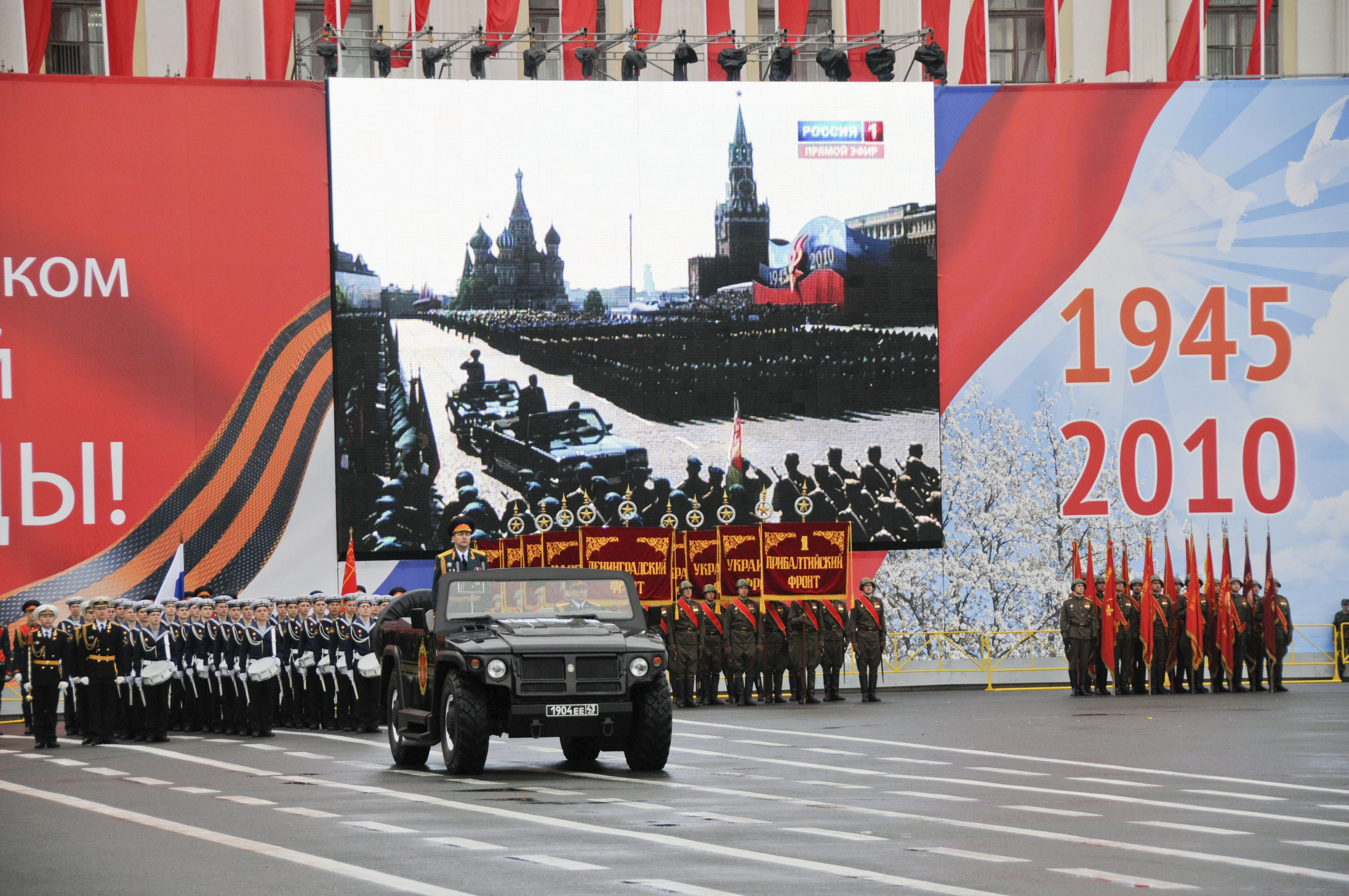
SP46 in 2010 Moscow Victory Day Parade in St. Petersburg.

==== STS ====
The CTC (English: STS) "Tigr" has a two-part opening and rotating cupola is installed on the roof, on which heavy machine gun(s) or grenade launcher are attached. The remaining crew can shoot out of the vehicle through side windows that can be opened. Optional equipped includes one-way portholes in the body or portholes in the armored glass windows. Inside the vehicle there are places for ammunition such as grenades etc., communication equipment and jammers. The interior has a sheathed hull with an anti-splinter coating made of aramid fiber. 4-stroke turbocharged diesel engine Cummins B 205. STS "Tigr" was accepted for supply to units of the General Staff of the Russian Federation by Order of the Minister of Defense of the Russian Federation from March 6, 2007. The STS took part in the 2014 Crimean operation.

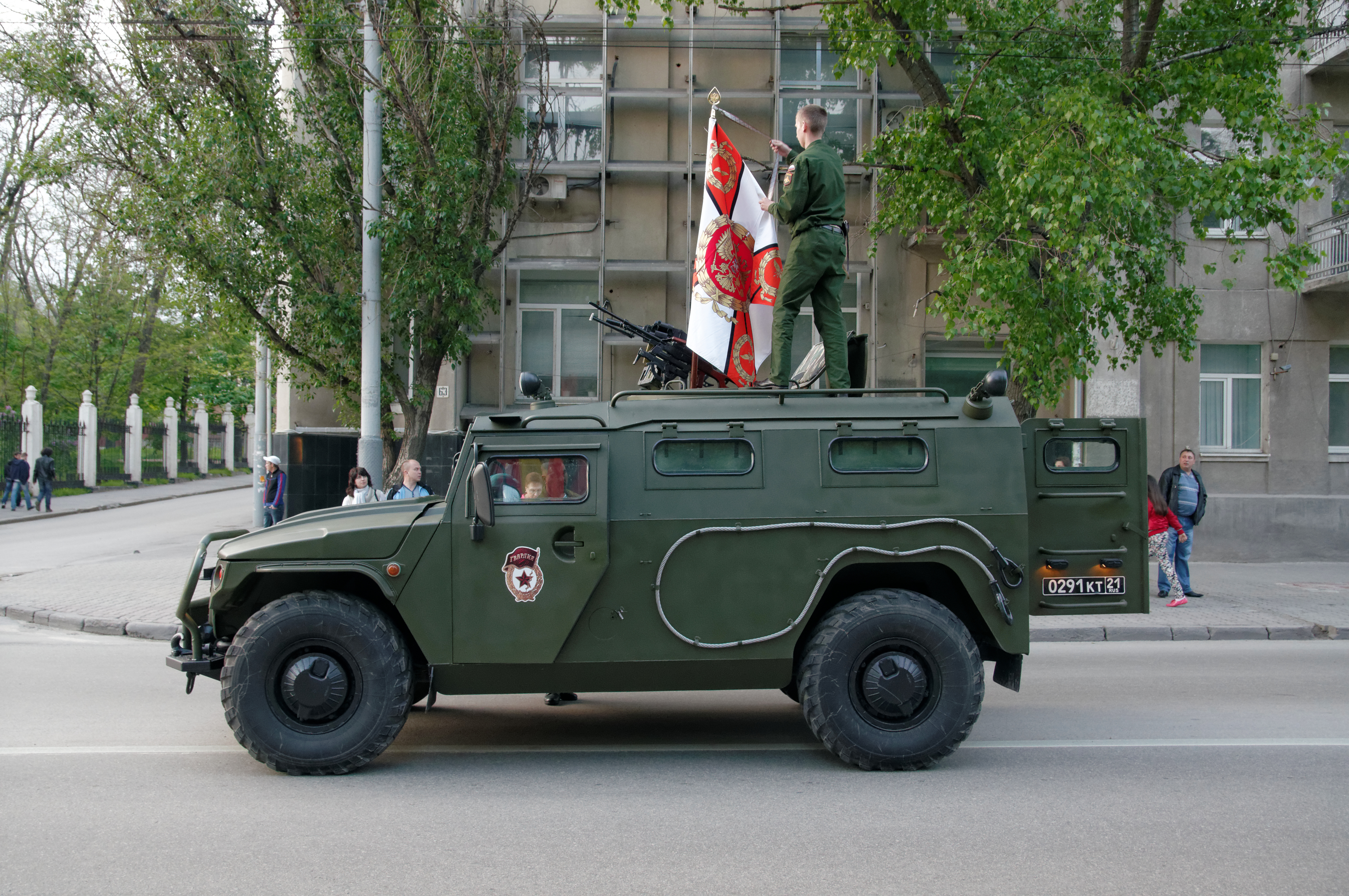
STS "Tigr" at 2014 Rostov-on-Don Victory Day Parade Rehearsal

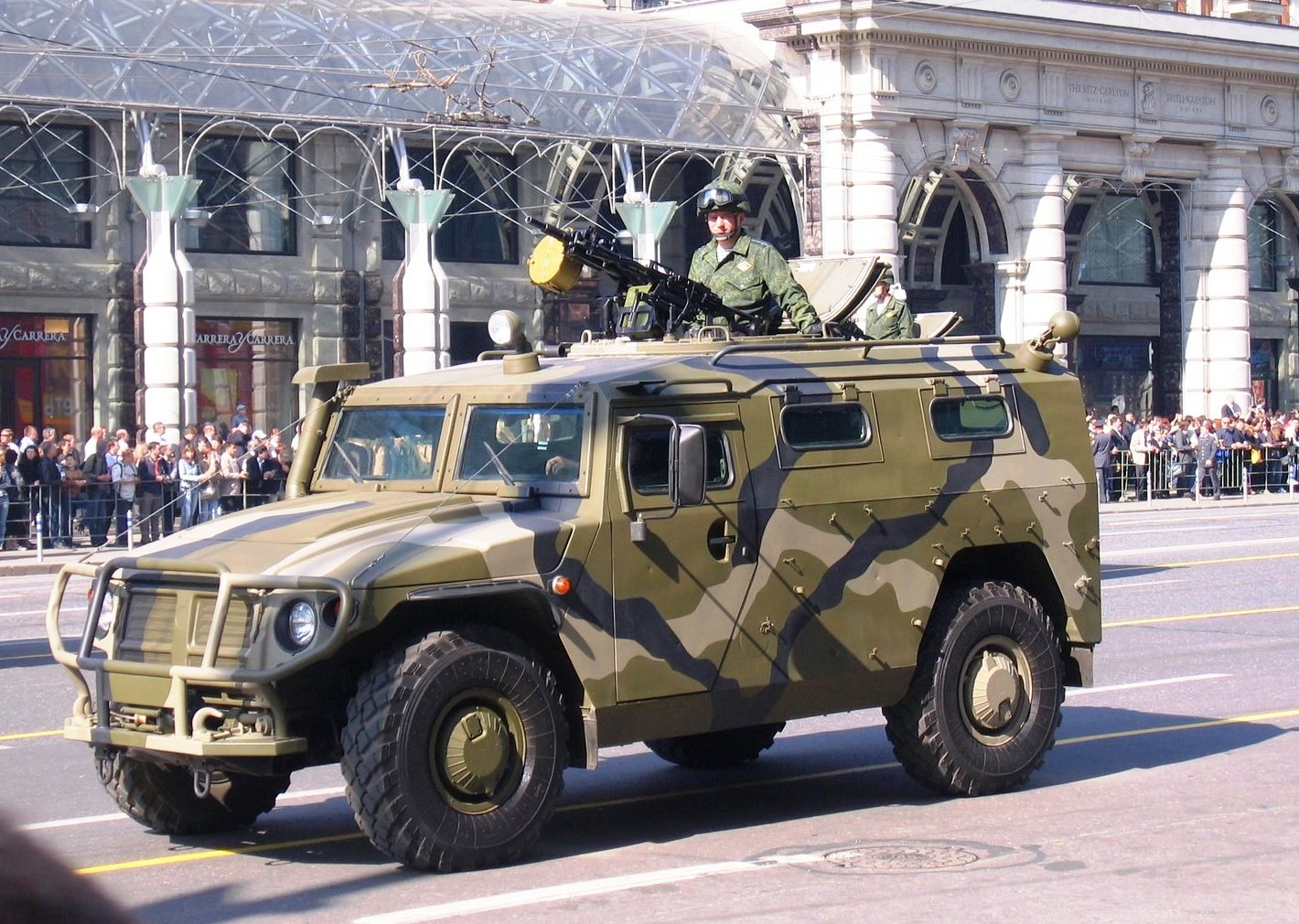
STS "Tigr" during 2008 Moscow May Day Parade Rehearsal

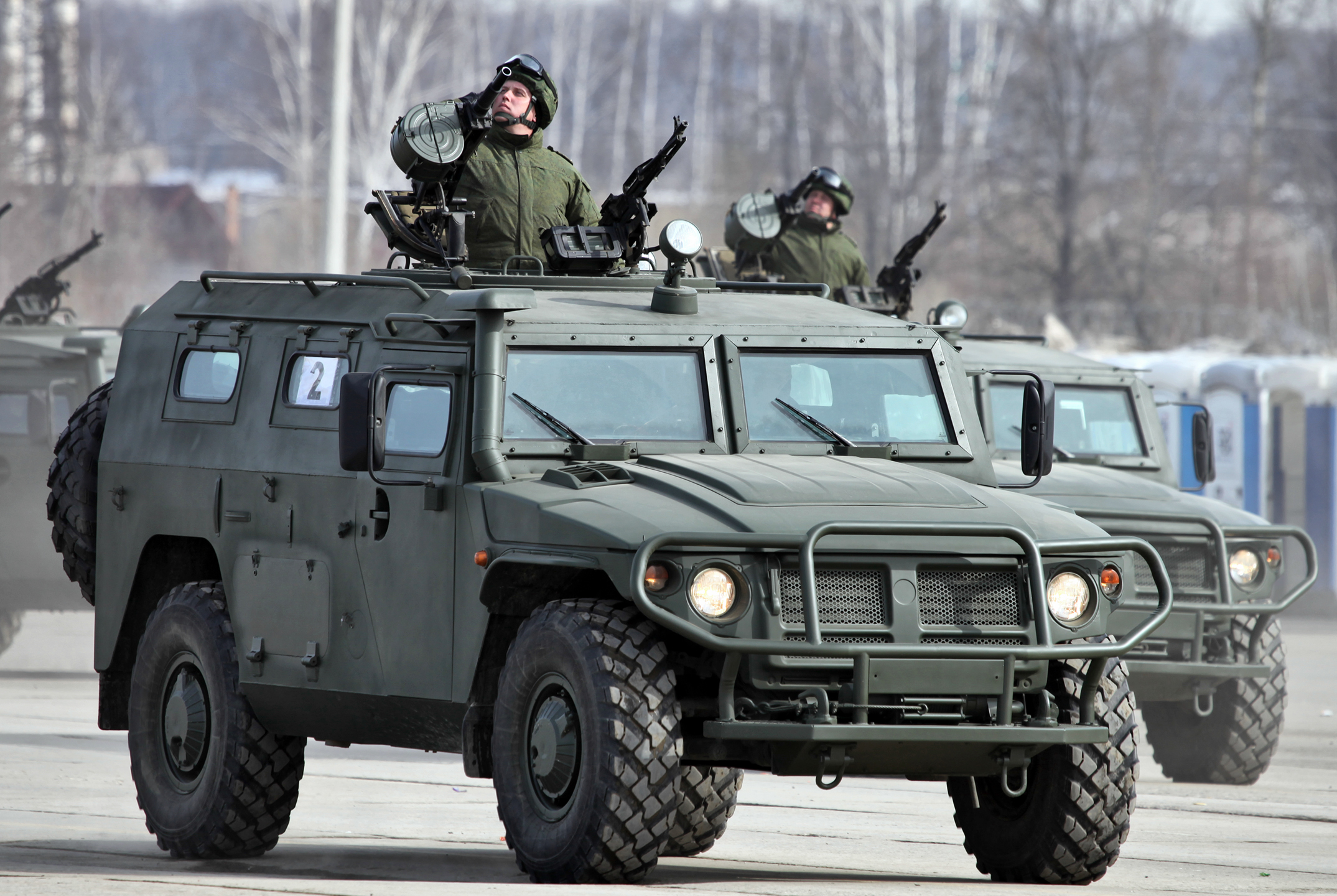
STS "Tigr" during 12 April 2013 Victory Day Parade rehearsal

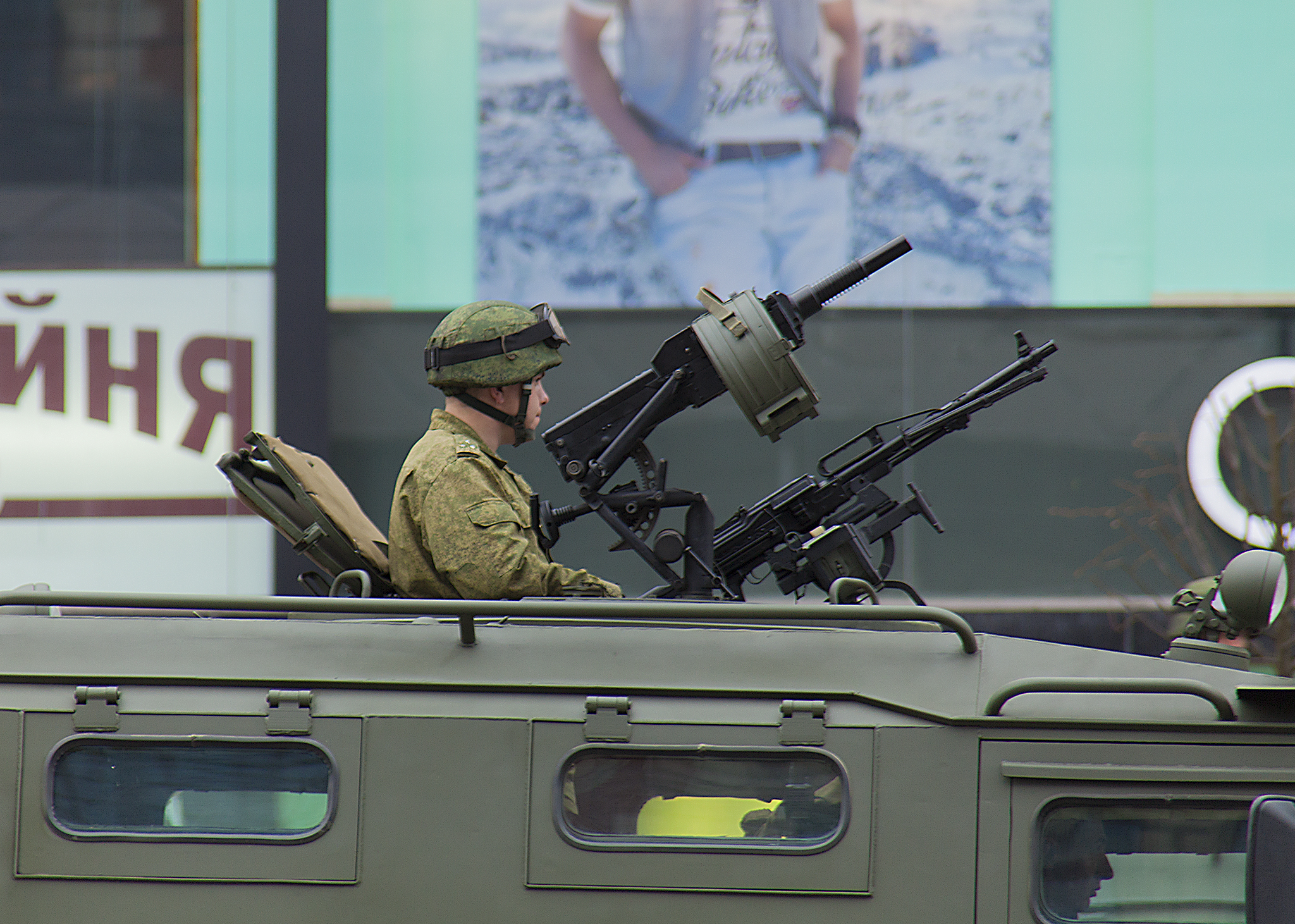
closeup of STS "Tigr" weapons station

==== SPM-1 ====
Специальная полицейская машина СПМ-1 (Special police car SPM-1) Tigr is used by the Russian Interior Ministry OMON in counter-terrorism operations and territorial defense. It is armoured, with IEC 50963-96 Class 3 side/rear protection and Class 5 frontal protection (GOST P 50963-96, level 1 corresponds to the STANAG 4569). The vehicle has accommodations for seven occupants including the driver. Early models permit the firing of personal weapons through one-way portholes in the body. In later models personal weapons can be fired through portholes in the armored glass. An automatic gun carriage can be fitted to the roof, along with radio signal jamming equipment.

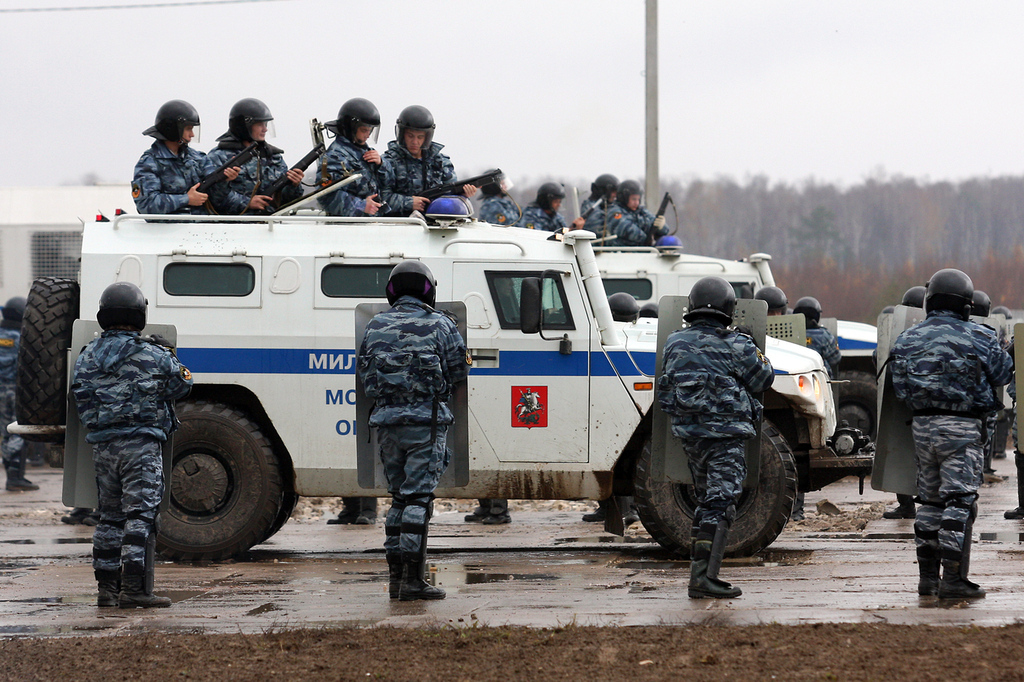
OMON SPM-1 Tigr vehicle during anti-riot training in Moscow

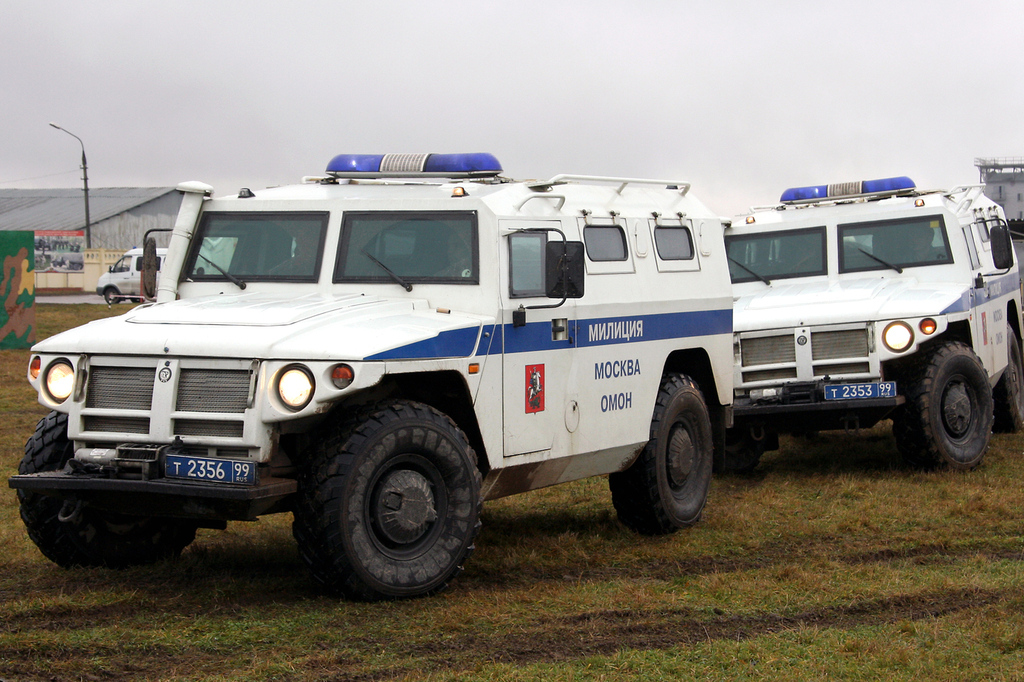
OMON SPM-1 Tigr vehicle during anti-riot training in Moscow

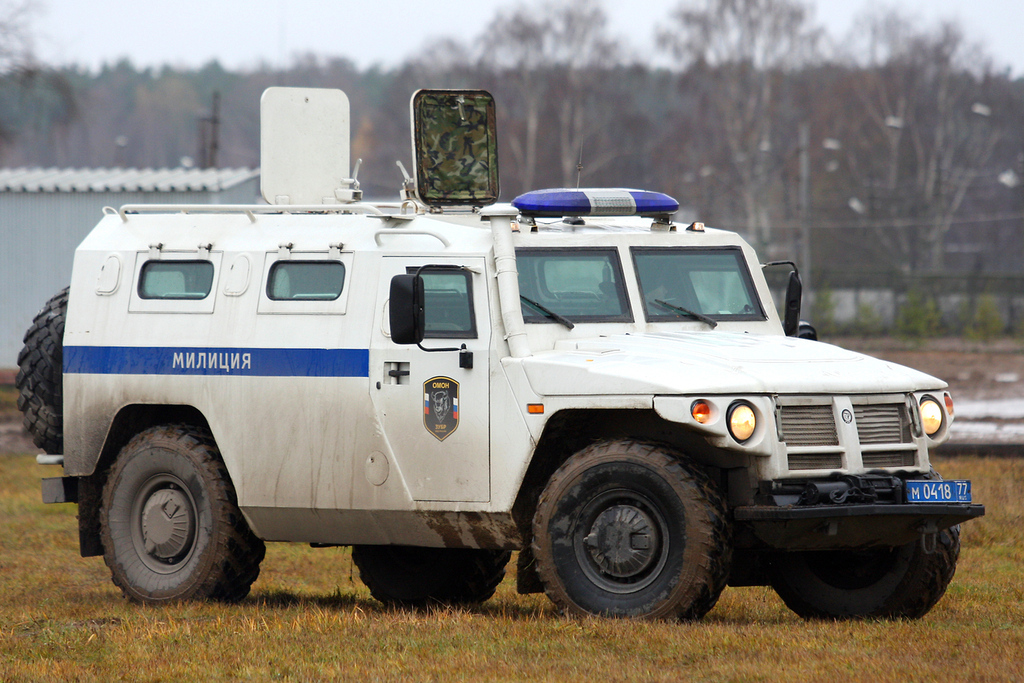
OMON Zubr SPM-1 vehicle

===== SPM-1 AAV =====
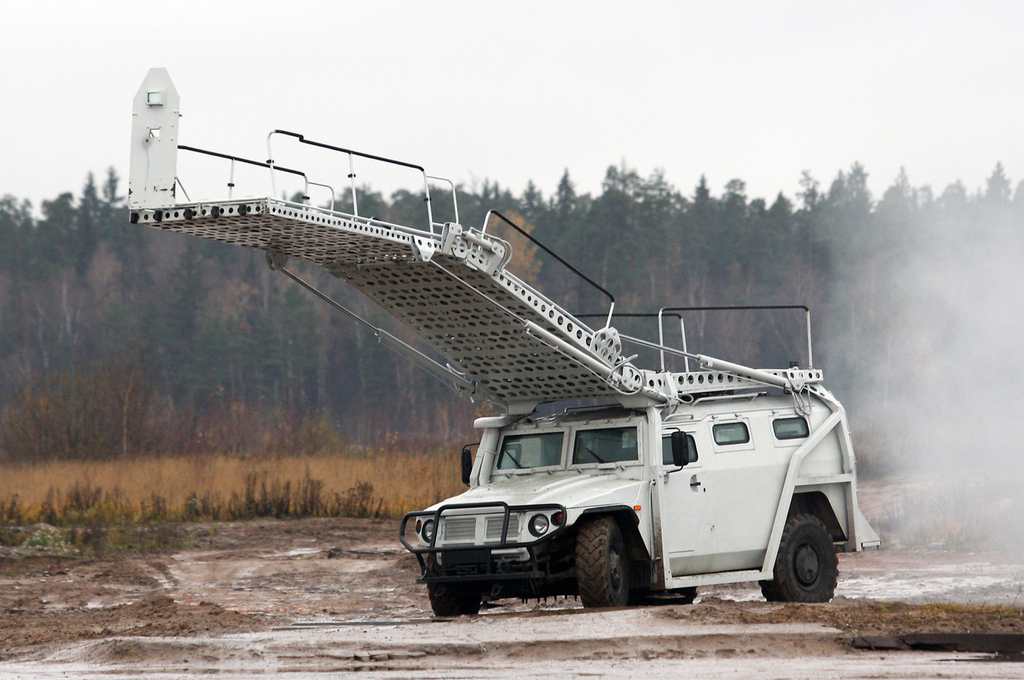
Abaim-Abanat special police assault vehicle based on SPM-1 Tigr vehicle

The SPM-1 Aircraft Assault Vehicle is an SPM-1 fitted with a large remote-control hydraulic ladder system. It is designed to provide access to the second or third floors of buildings and aircraft.

==== SPM-2 "Tigr-Alpha-BB" ====
Специальная полицейская машина СПМ-2 (Special Police Vehicle SPM-2) Tigr-Alfa-BB (Tiger-Alpha-VV) is an SPM-1 with GOST 50963-965 level 5 ballistic protection all around (instead of a mixture of level 3 and 5). Two additional glass hatches on the roof allow for the firing of personal weapons.

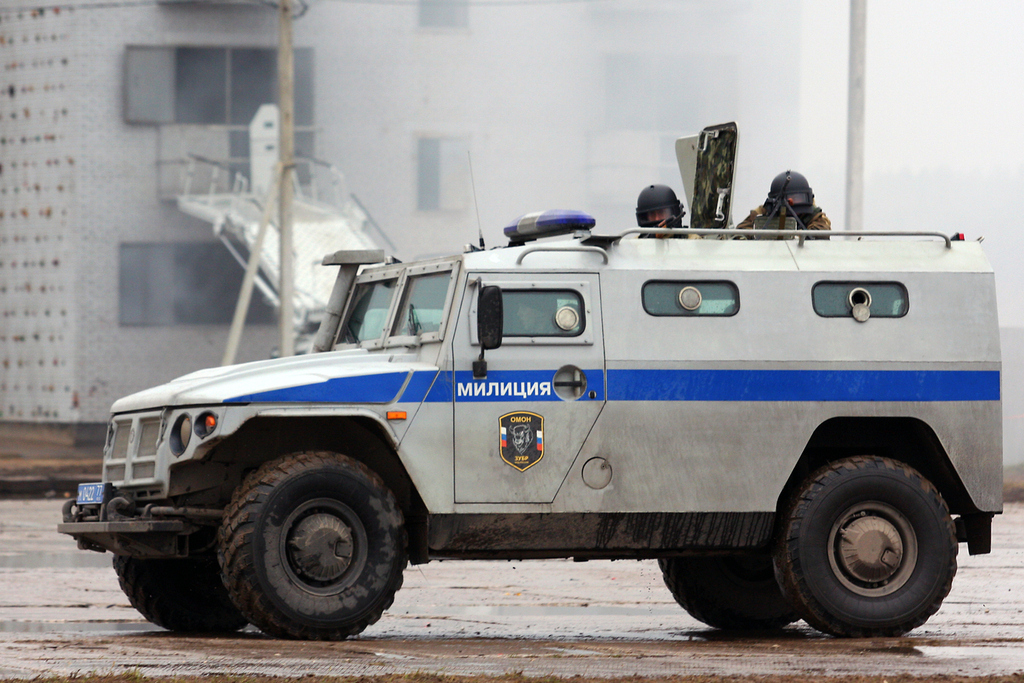
OMON Zubr SPM-2 Tigr vehicle

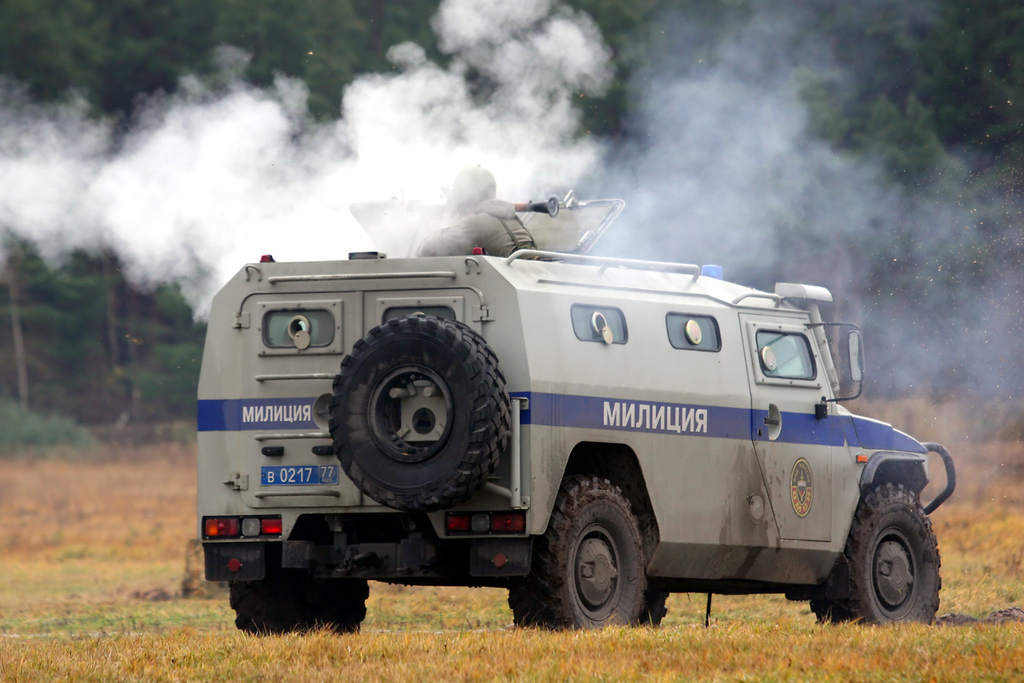
OMON Zubr SPM-2 Tigr vehicle

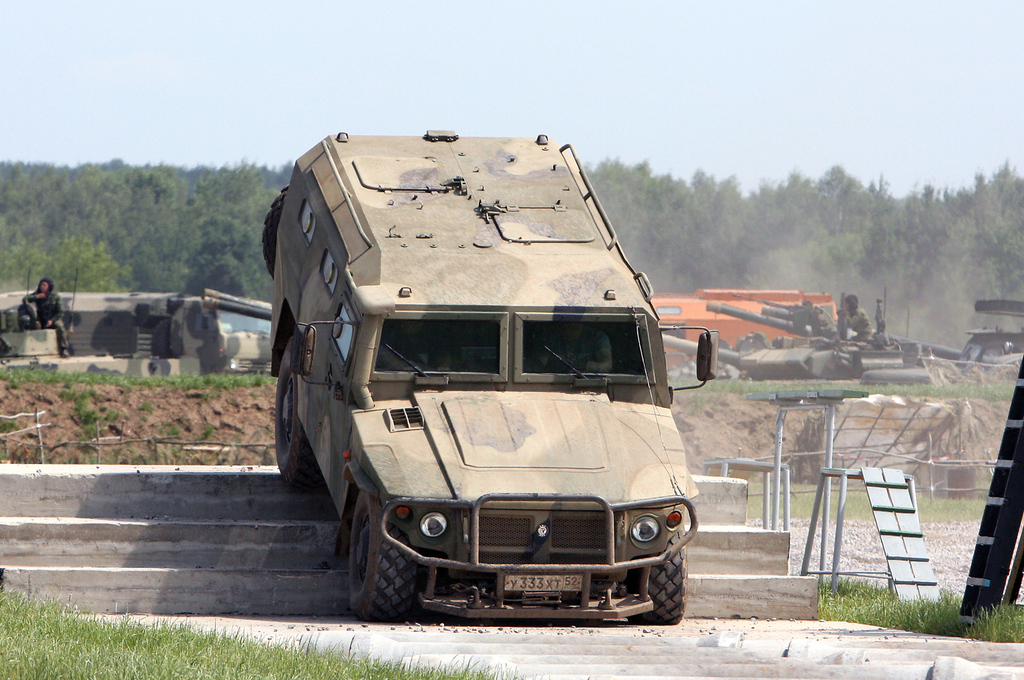
SPM-2 Tigr demonstrator at IDELF in 2010

===== R-145BMA =====
This variant is designed as a command center for special operations and crises. It is a SPM-2 Tigr fitted with extensive communications equipment.

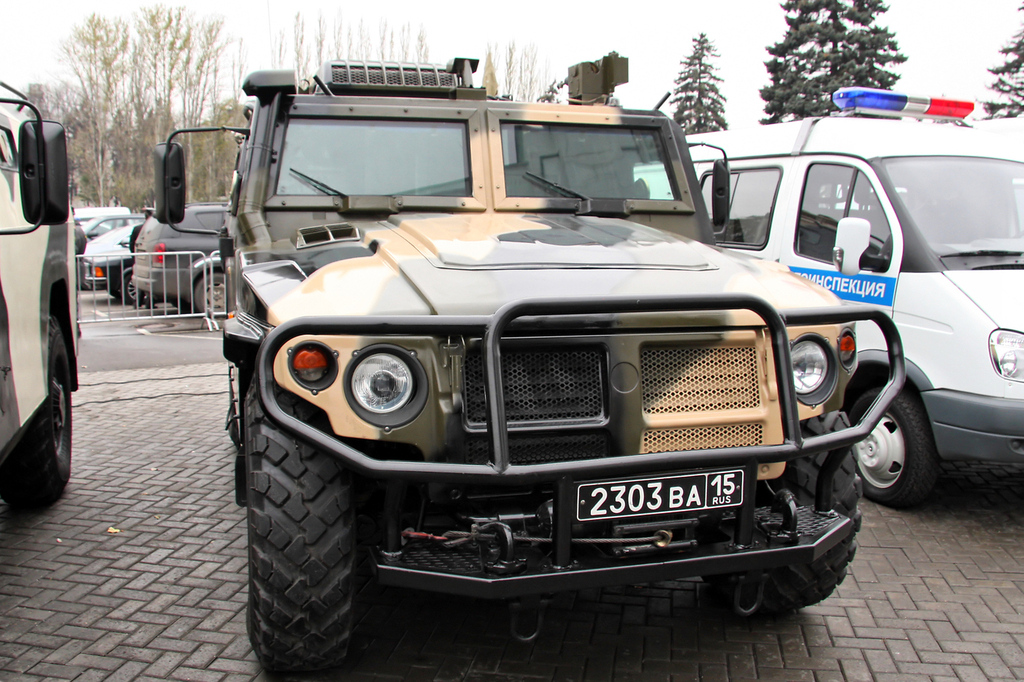
R-145BMA command vehicle

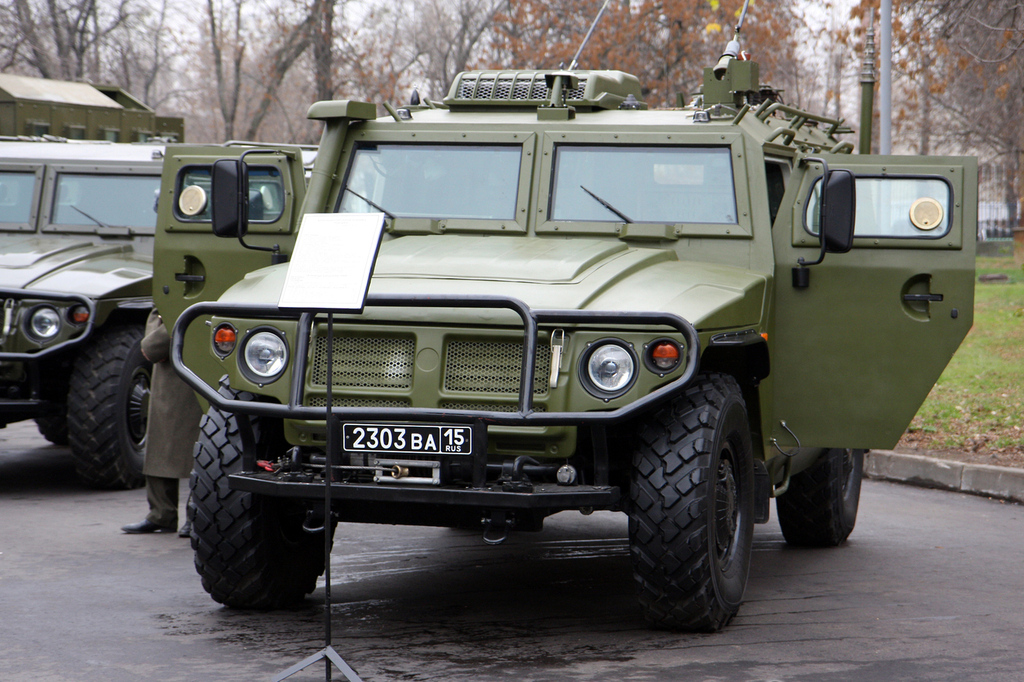
R-145BMA command vehicle on display at Interpolitex in 2008

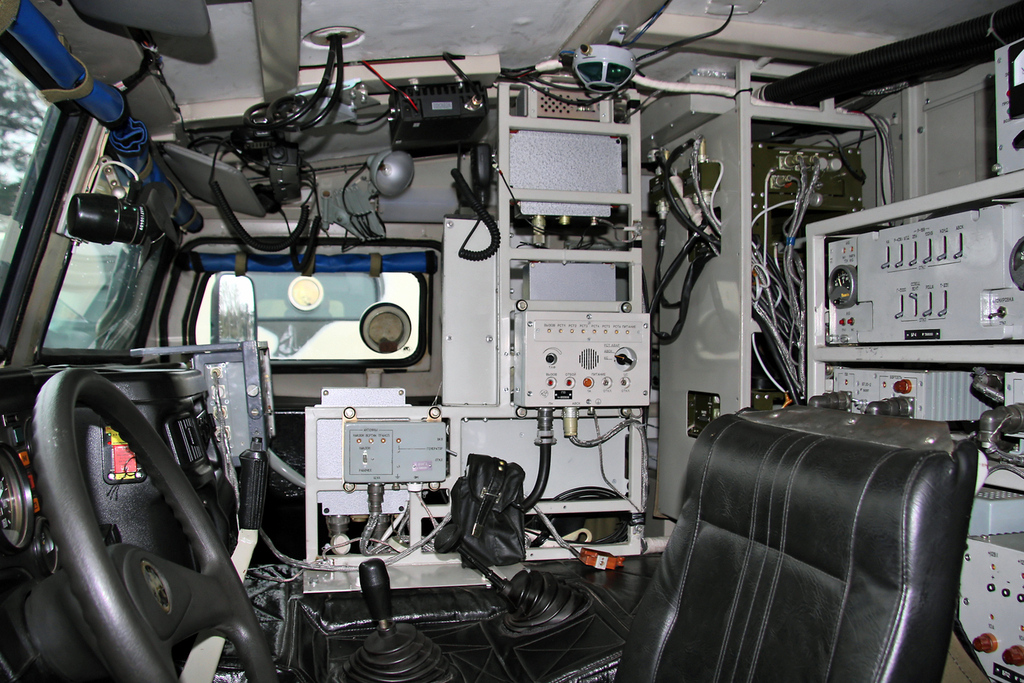
The driver's position of the R-145BMA command vehicle at Interpolitex in 2008

===== Kornet-D =====
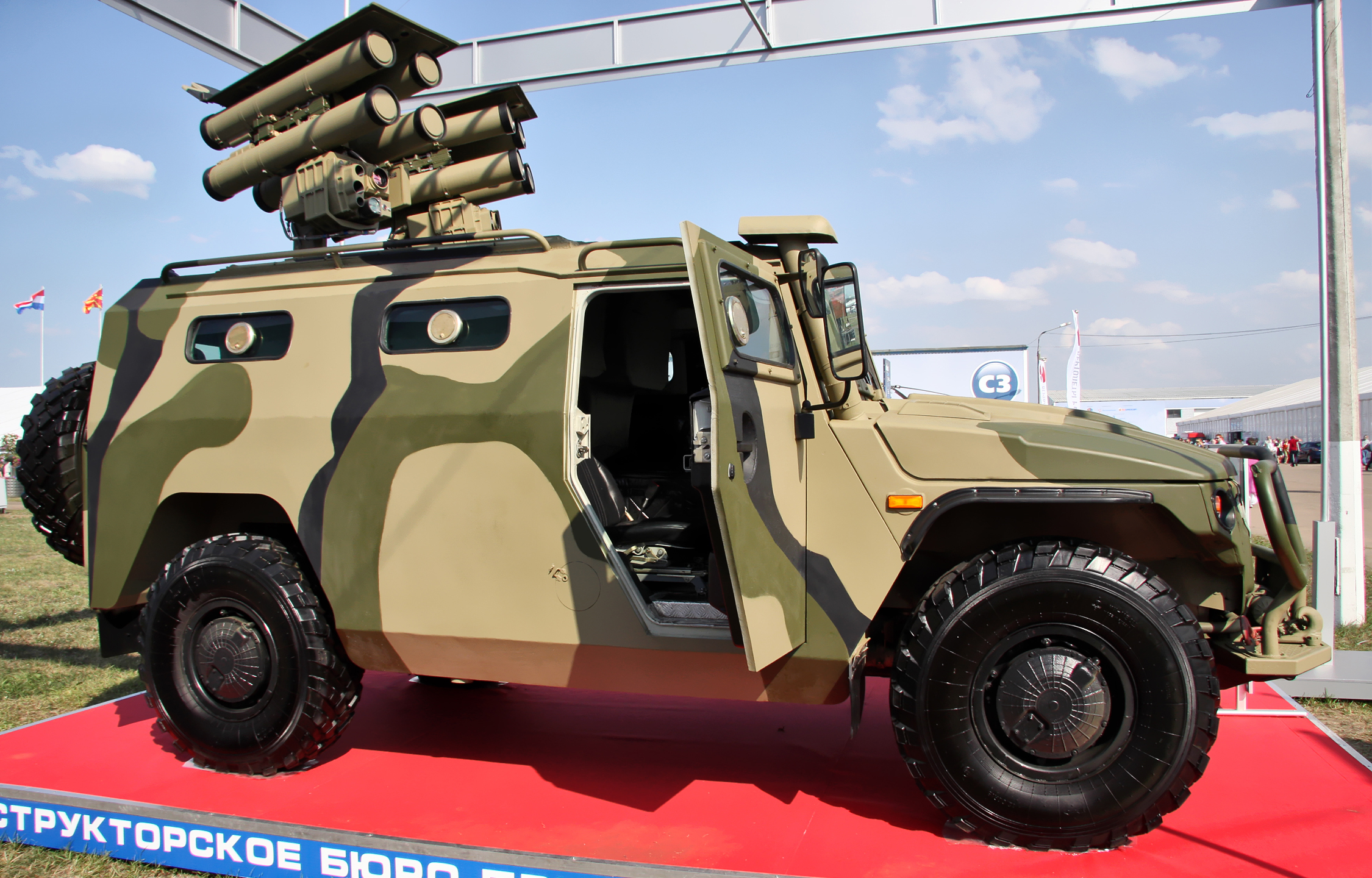
Kornet-EM at MAKS-2011

In 2011, the Tula Instrument Design Bureau demonstrated an upgraded Kornet-EM anti-tank missile system. Two such units were mounted on a modified chassis of the SPM-2 Tigr. The machine is equipped with two retractable launchers for 8 missiles and gunnery equipment (remote weapons control with screens to display images from the sighting systems), as well as 8 additional missiles. This anti-tank system tested at Kapustin-Yar. The missile complex when mounted on a Tigr is known as the Kornet-D, and it is meant to replace the 9P148 missile carrier. Deliveries started in 2015.

==== "Project 420" ====
In early 2010, an improved Tigr armored vehicle with a 420-horsepower 5.9 litres (360.0 cu in) Cummins ISB and a Chrysler 545RFE automatic transmission was created. This engine/transmission combination was originally designed for a Dodge Ram pickup. Externally, the vehicle featured an additional air intake on the bonnet and enlarged brakes. Acceleration time to 100 km/h (62 mph) was reduced from 35 to 23 seconds compared to the standard version, and the top speed increased from 140 km/h (87 mph) to 160 km/h (99 mph).

==== Tigr-M ====
During the 2010 Interpolitex exhibition, the Multi-purpose Armored Vehicle (Ru: Автомобиль многоцелевого назначения (АМН)) AMN 233114 Tigr-M was presented by the Military Industrial Company. It featured a new YaMZ-534 diesel engine, a new armored hood, air filter installation, an increase in the number of rear passenger seats (from 8 to 9) and the replacement of the bicuspid rear hatch with a large square hatch. The M stands for Modernizirovanniy or Upgraded in Russian.

Currently, the Tigr-M is mass-produced and supplied to the Russian Army, including with the new Arbalet-DM remote control weapons station which is composed of 12.7mm Kord or 7.62mm PKTM machine guns.

The upgraded Tigr 4×4 armoured vehicle with increased protection displayed at the Army 2018 defence show in Kubinka, near Moscow, on 21–26 August. The upgrade is based on combat experience gained during operations in Syria and designated the ASN 233115 Tigr-M SpN.

The difference between the AMN 233144 and ASN 233115 models include a reduced number of seats since the latter has nine seats while the former has six seats, traverse platform on roof to mount weapons and stowage compartments inside to store weapons, ammo and accessories.

The Tigr-M equipped with anti-drone module presented at the Army-2022 forum.

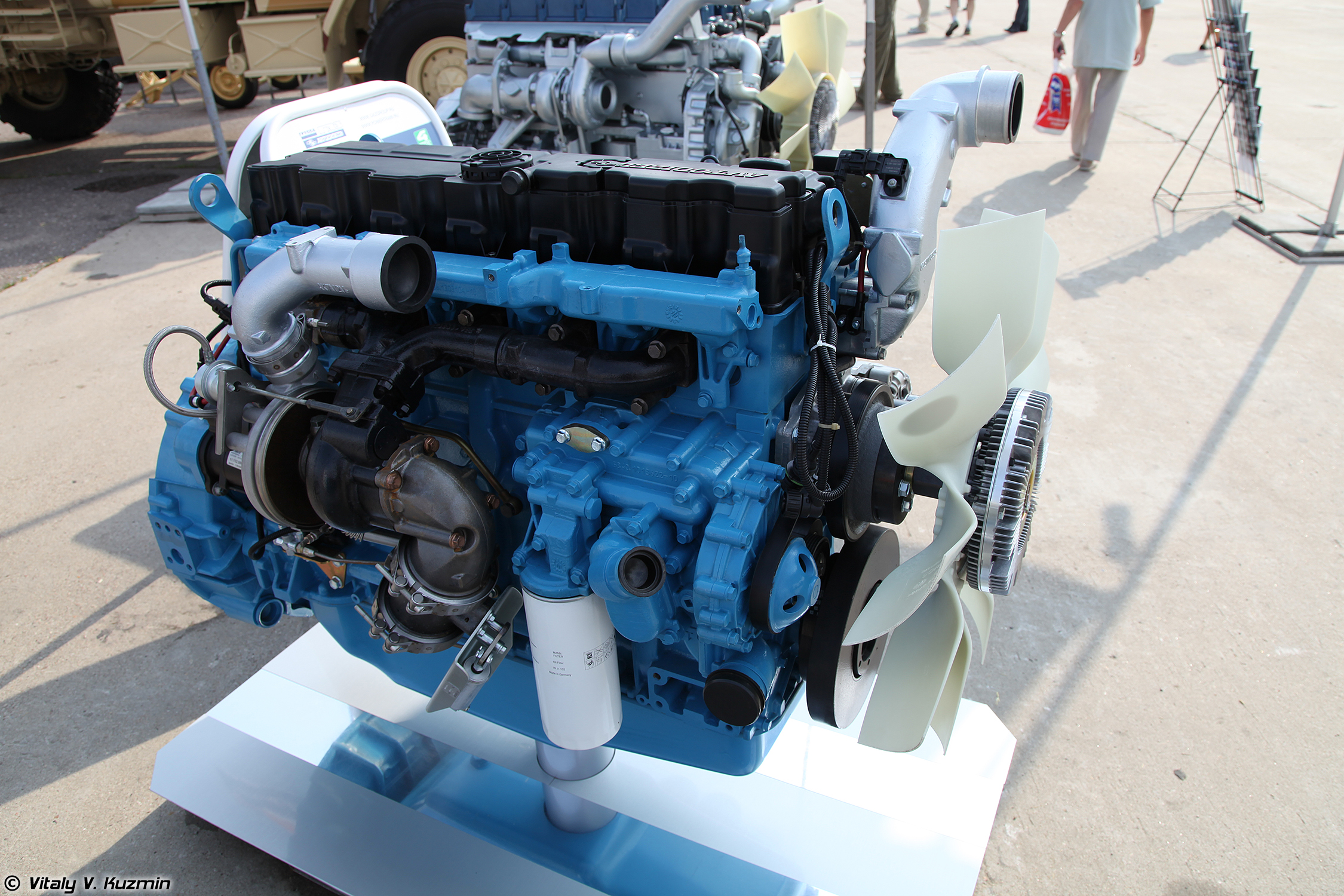
YaMZ-5347-10 diesel of the Tiger-M

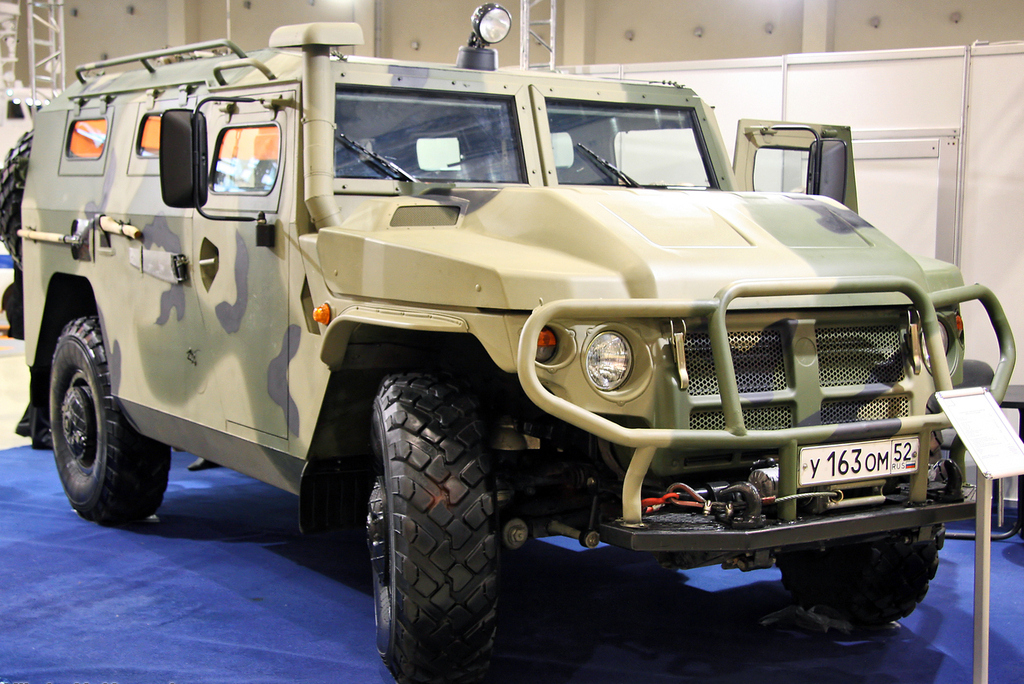
VPK-233114 Tiger-M

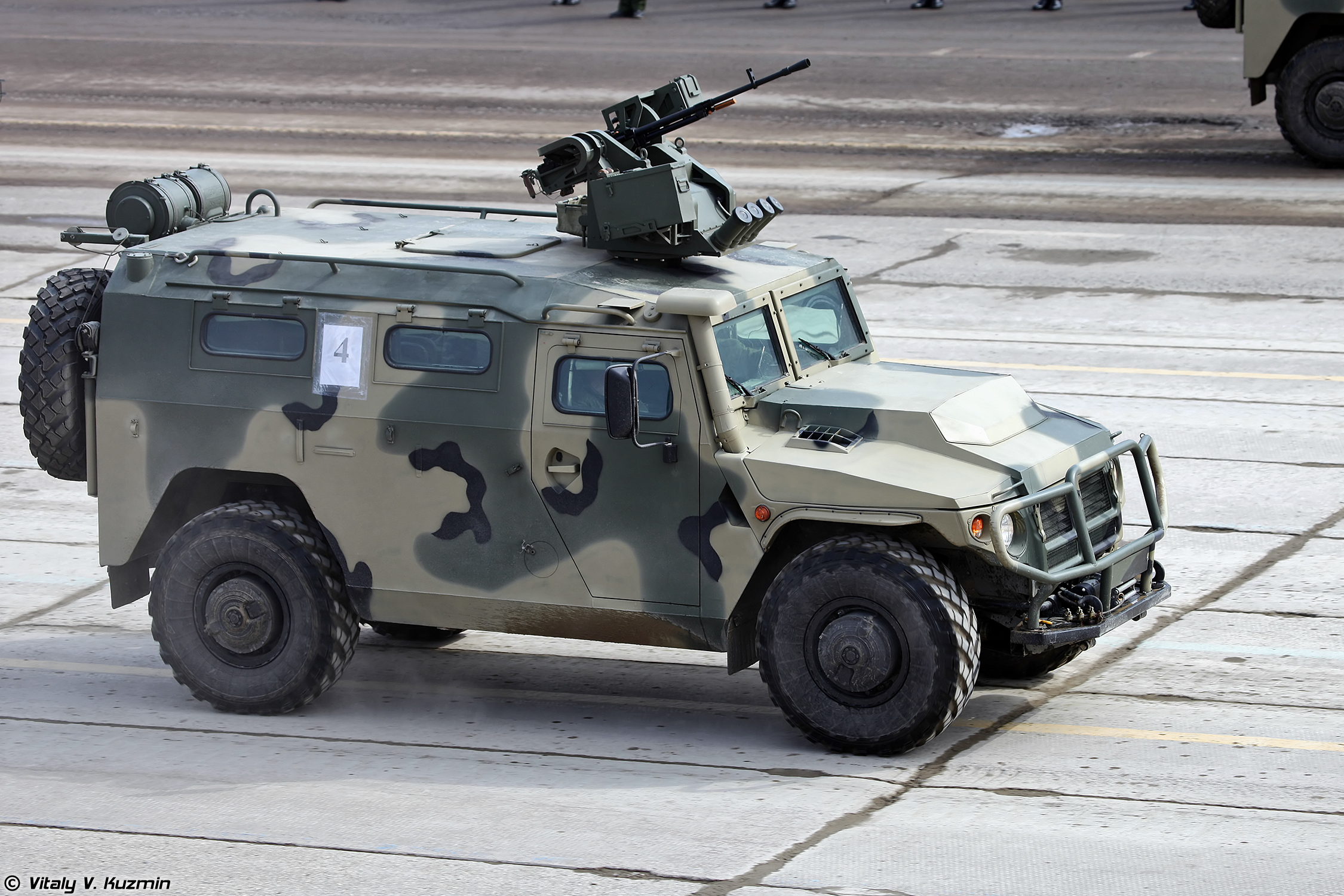
AMN 233114 Tigr-M with remote controlled turret Arbalet-DM

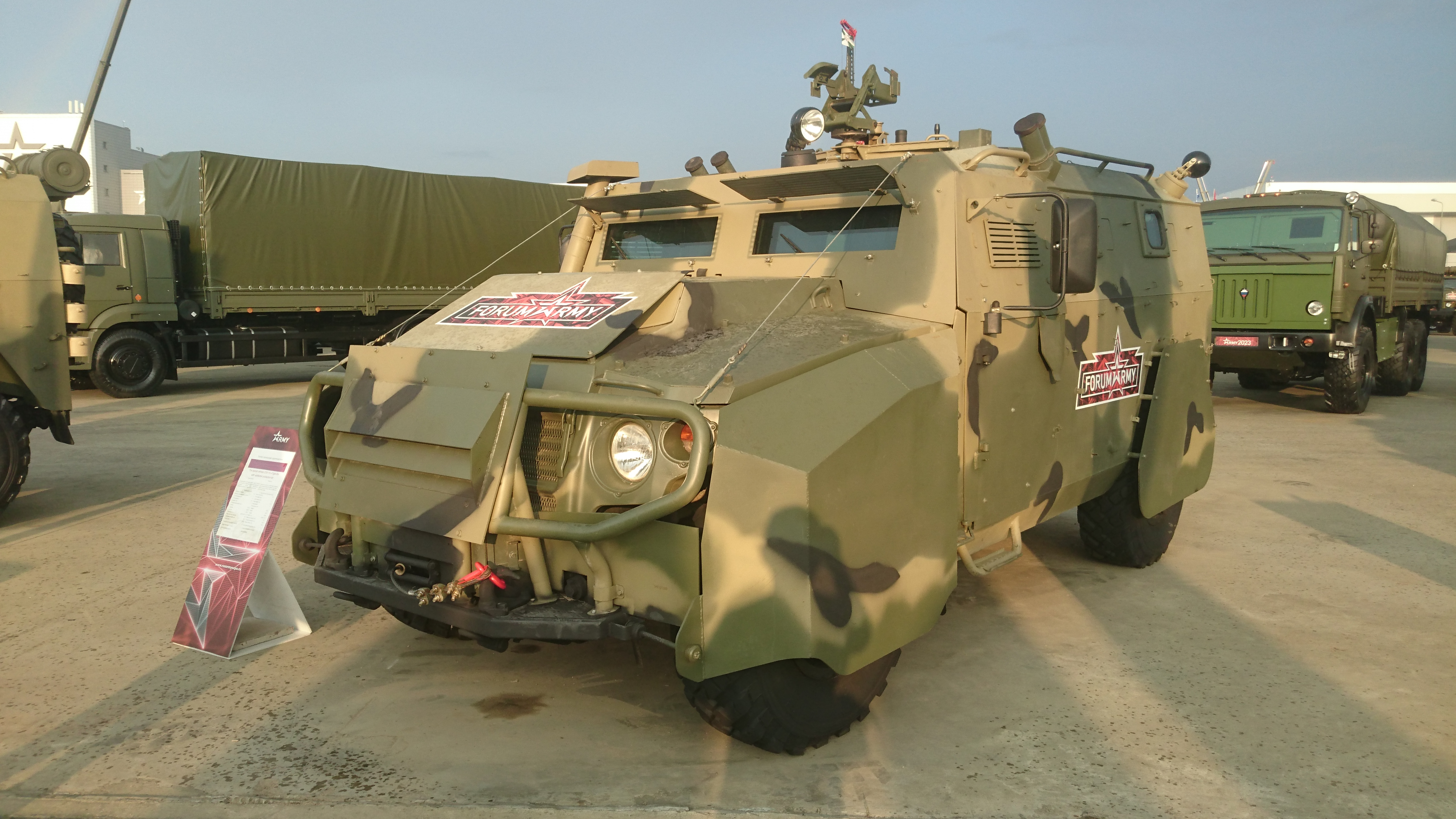
AMN 233115 with additional protection

===== Tigr-6A SPV =====
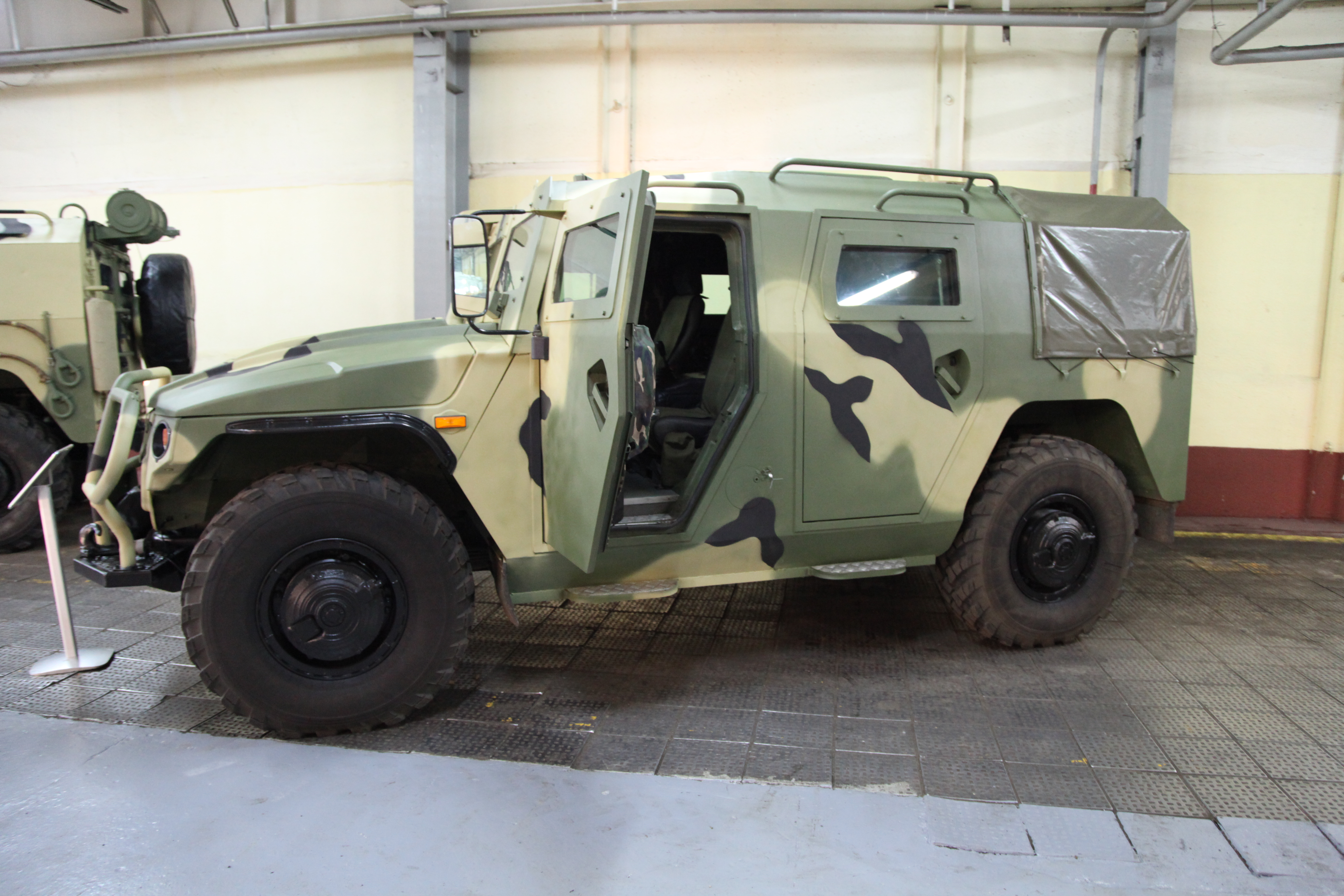
Tigr 6A

The CTC "Tigr" SPV prototype vehicle was first shown at the Bronnitsi Armoured Vehicles Show on June 10, 2011. Based on the SPM-2, the SPV is designed for combat officer transport. It has a four-door station wagon body with increased GOST 6A armor protection (heavy mine protection and special shock-absorbing seats/footrests which are not attached to the floor). As of November 2012, tests are being conducted. The roof of the car has a large rotating hatch with folding a folding lid and two brackets for mounting weapons. Firing from the personal weapons of the crew and the assault group carried out through open armored glass in the doors and on the sides of the vehicle. There are places for stowage of ammunition, rocket-propelled grenade launchers such as the RPG-26, a radio station and a radio-controlled explosive devices blocker.

===== MKTK REI PP =====
The Tigr-M MKTK REI PP Leer-2 VPK-233114 or the Mobile Electronic Warfare system EW vehicle is a variant of the Tigr-M equipped with mobile technical control, electronic emulation and Leer-2 electronic countermeasures system.

==== Anti-aircraft vehicles ====
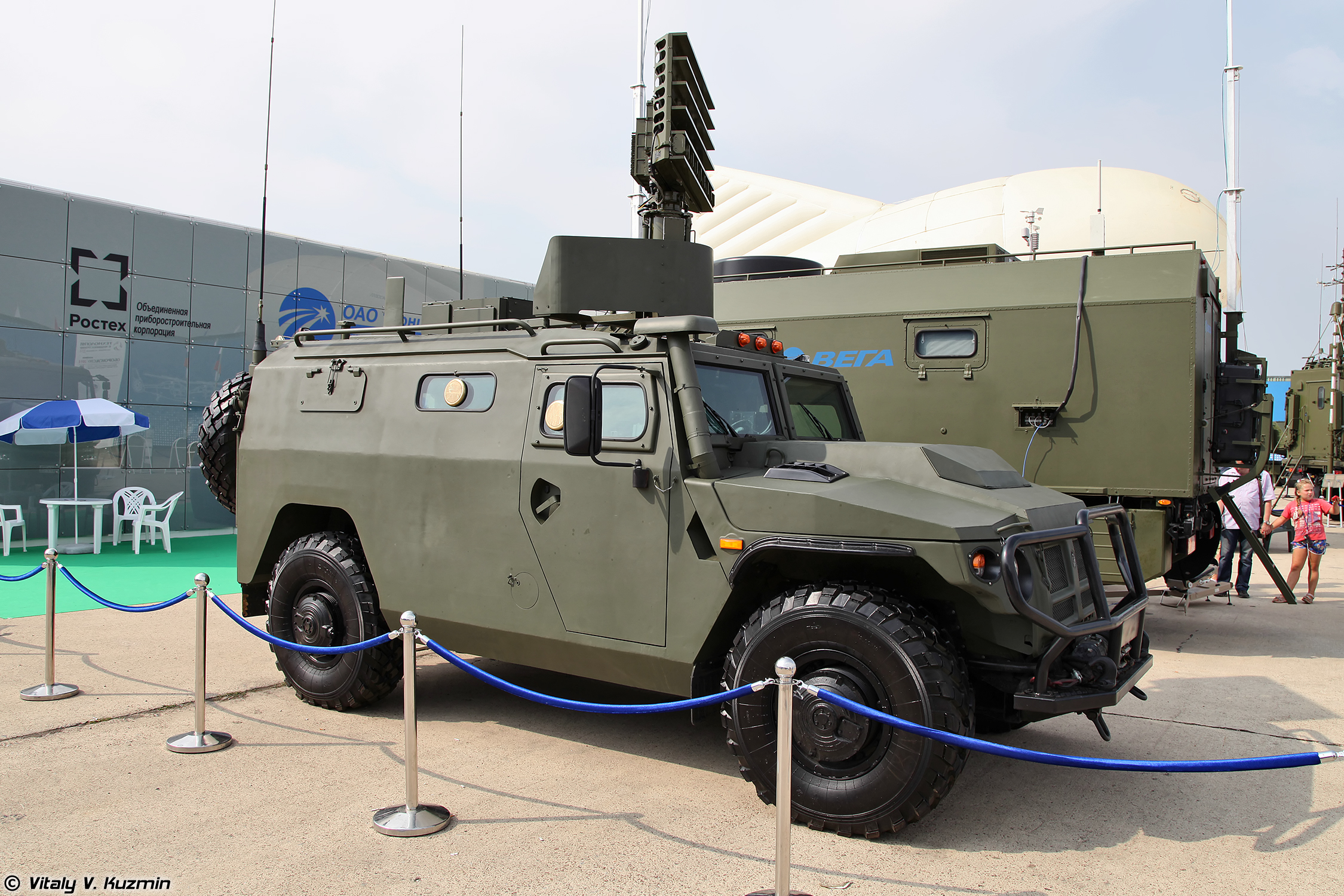
Air defence command vehicle on Tigr-M chassis

Gibka-S Self-Propelled Very Short-Range Air Defence (VSHORAD) System.

The Tigr chassis has been fitted with the 1L122E radar to allow the vehicle to simultaneously locate 15 aerial targets per second and perform target assessment in one second. Its purpose is to give Russian soldiers armed with MANPADS a command and target indication vehicle to receive more precise target data. The vehicle can deploy within five minutes and operate in temperatures from -50 to 60 degrees Celsius (-58 to 132 degrees Fahrenheit). Development started in mid-2013, with the first prototype delivered in May 2014. The vehicle is currently an independently developed prototype, with talks being held for trials and the follow-up launch of series line production.

The Gibka-S is an anti-aircraft Tigr variant carrying four Igla-S or 9K333 Verba MANPADS tubes on a retractable launching station. By January 2017, the system was being prepared for preliminary trials. State tests were completed in December 2019. Its export version is ready for serial production as of late 2021. Deliveries to the Russian Army started in 2022. It is currently in production.

==== Armored ambulance ====
BNK has developed an armored ambulance version of the Tigr.

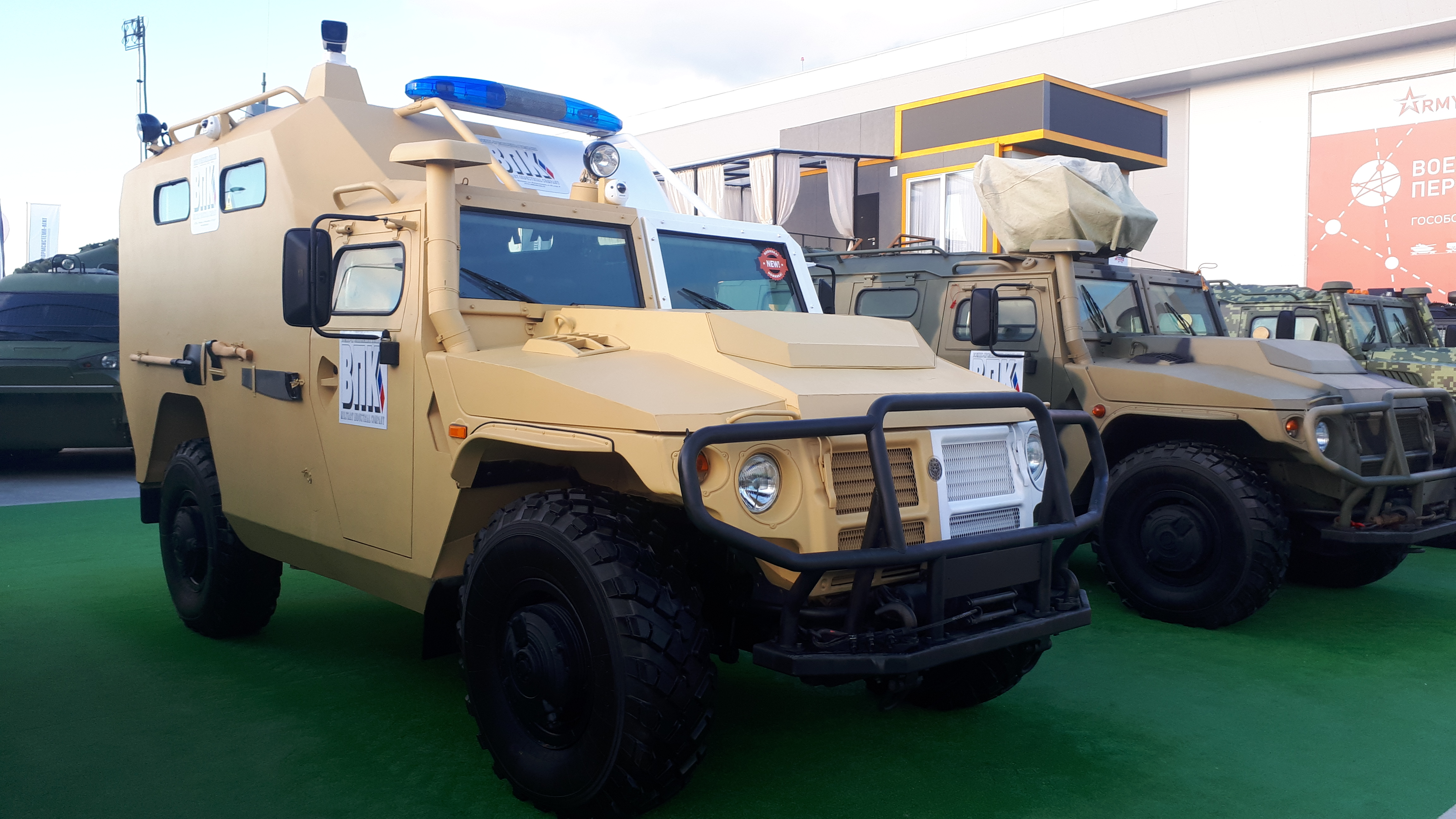

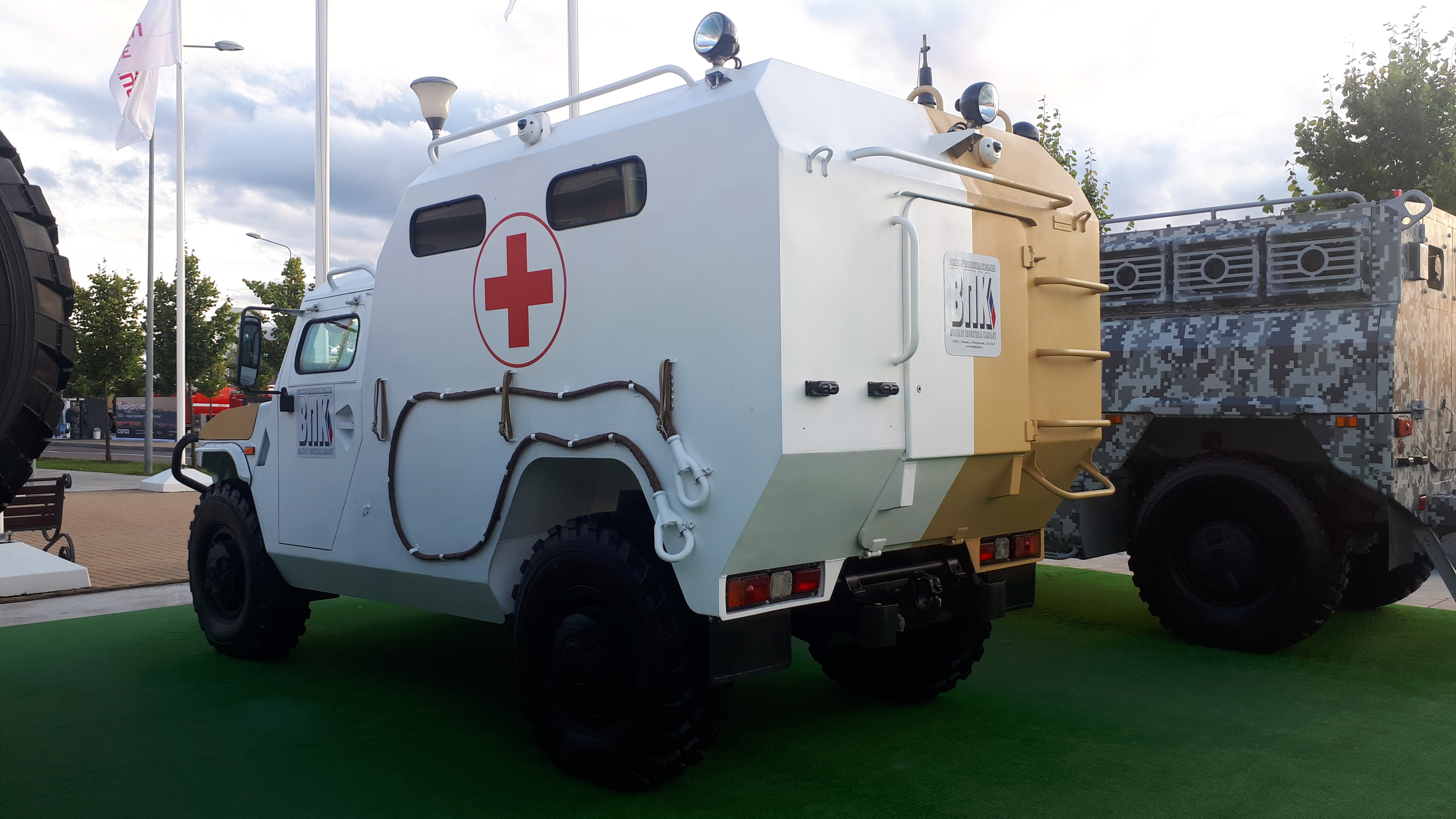

==== Right-hand drive variant ====
There are Tigrs made that can be configured for right-hand drive countries.

==== Special Combat Reconnaissance Vehicle ====
A recon vehicle equipped with optical, thermal imaging, radar, acoustic and seismic reconnaissance equipment.

==== Psychological Operations Vehicle ====
Psychological Operations (PsyOps) vehicle with audio and video broadcasting equipment.

==== Remote-Controlled Vehicle ====
VPK announced a remote-controlled version of the Tigr in August 2016.

==== VPK-233115 Tigr-M SPN ====
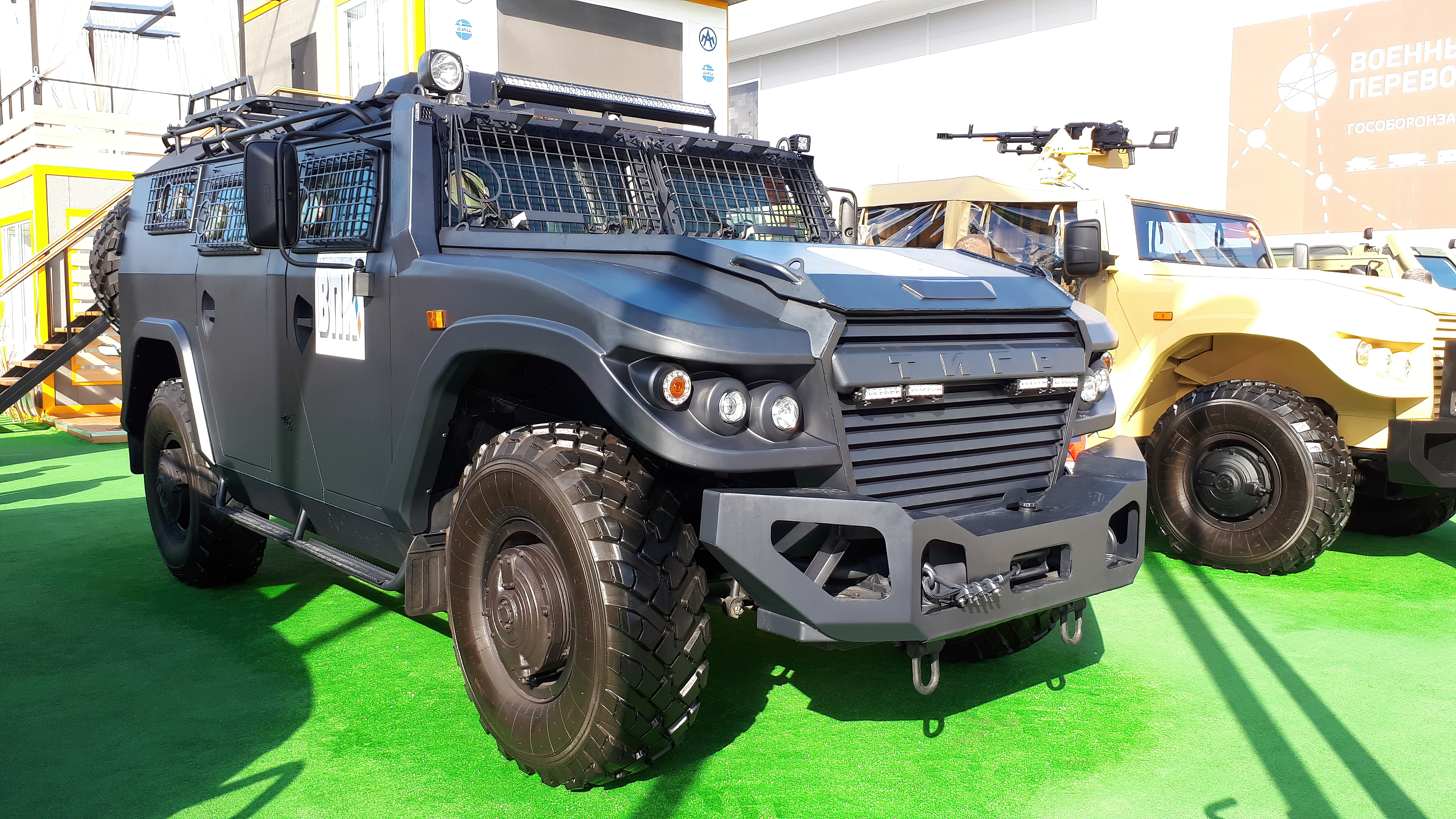
VPK-233115 Tigr-M with redesigned front end at "Armiya 2020" exhibition

The Military-Industrial Company (Voyenno-Promishlennaya Kompaniya, VPK) from Russia has upgraded its Tigr (Tiger) 4x4 light utility vehicle (LUV) called ASN-233115 Tigr-M SpN, (SpN for Spetsialnogo Naznacheniya, (SPETSNAZ)).

=== Belarusian variants ===
==== Lis-PM ====
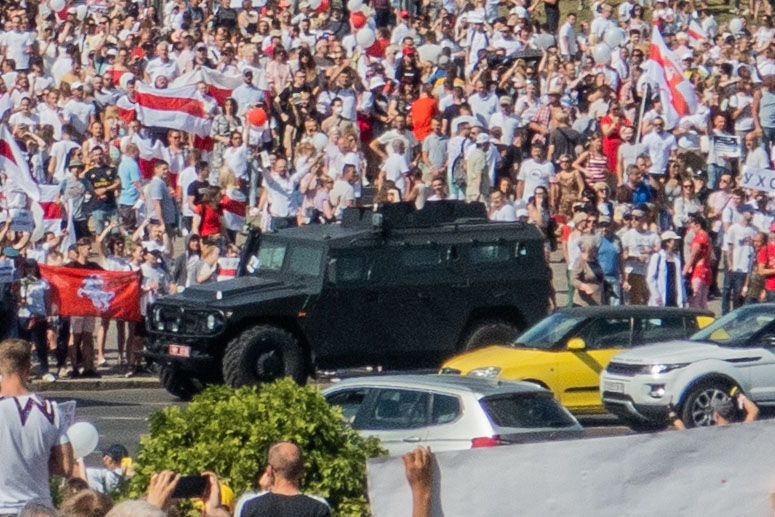
Belarus Lis MZKT

The MZKT–233036 Lis-PM is a Belarusian-made version of the Tigr produced by the Minsk Wheel Tractor Plant (MZKT Volat) in cooperation with its Russian counterparts.

The Lis-PM has a weight of up to 7.5 t and transports eight soldiers. The vehicle is armed with an NSVT Utyos 12.7 mm heavy machinegun (HMG).

==== Shershen ATGM ====
A variant with the twin-barreled Shershen ATGM.

=== Chinese variants ===
The Chinese-made Tigrs are equipped with Yuchai-made YC V6 300 diesel engines, new headlights and radiators.

==== Yanjing Guardian ====
- YJ2081A Command Car Vehicle – A basic 4×4 vehicle with four doors at the front and doors at the back with a winch mounted.
- YJ2081B Recon Vehicle – A 4×4 vehicle that looks like the YJ2081A model, meant to be used for recon missions.
- YJ2081C Protected Assault Vehicle – A 4×4 vehicle equipped with a RWS mount on top, two doors at the front and doors at the back.
- YJ2120D Protection Logistic Support Vehicle – A 6×6 equipped with a load handling system allowing the loading/unloading of different load platforms and containers.

==== Yanjing Defender ====
- YJ2080B Recon Vehicle – A basic 4×4 vehicle used for recon vehicles, appears similarly to the YJ2081A/B Guardian models.
- YJ2080C1 Anti-Riot Vehicle
- YJ2080C Protected Assault Vehicle – A 4×4 vehicle equipped with a RWS mount on top, two doors at the front and doors at the back.
- YJ2080C Missile Launcher Vehicle – A 4×4 vehicle equipped with an 8-rocket launcher module mounted on top.

=== Emirati/Egyptian variants ===
The Falcon by STREIT Group, an analogue of the export modification "Tigr". The license to manufacture them was acquired in 2018. It was unveiled at the AAD 2018 and EDEX 2018 convention.

It's measured at 5.7 metres long, 2.33 metres wide, and is 2.4 metres high with a payload of 1,500 kg. The basic version carries two crew and seven passengers and can be armed with a 7.62 or 12.7 mm machinegun or an automatic grenade launcher. Ballistic armour is at CEN Level BR6 and BR7 while landmine protection is to STANAG Level 2.

The Falcon has a Cummins ISB 6.7 litre diesel engine developing 385 hp and a top speed of 125–140 km/h.

=== Slovak variants ===
Corvus Slovakia s.r.o is licensed to manufacture the Tigr.

== Tigr-based developments ==
=== Russia ===
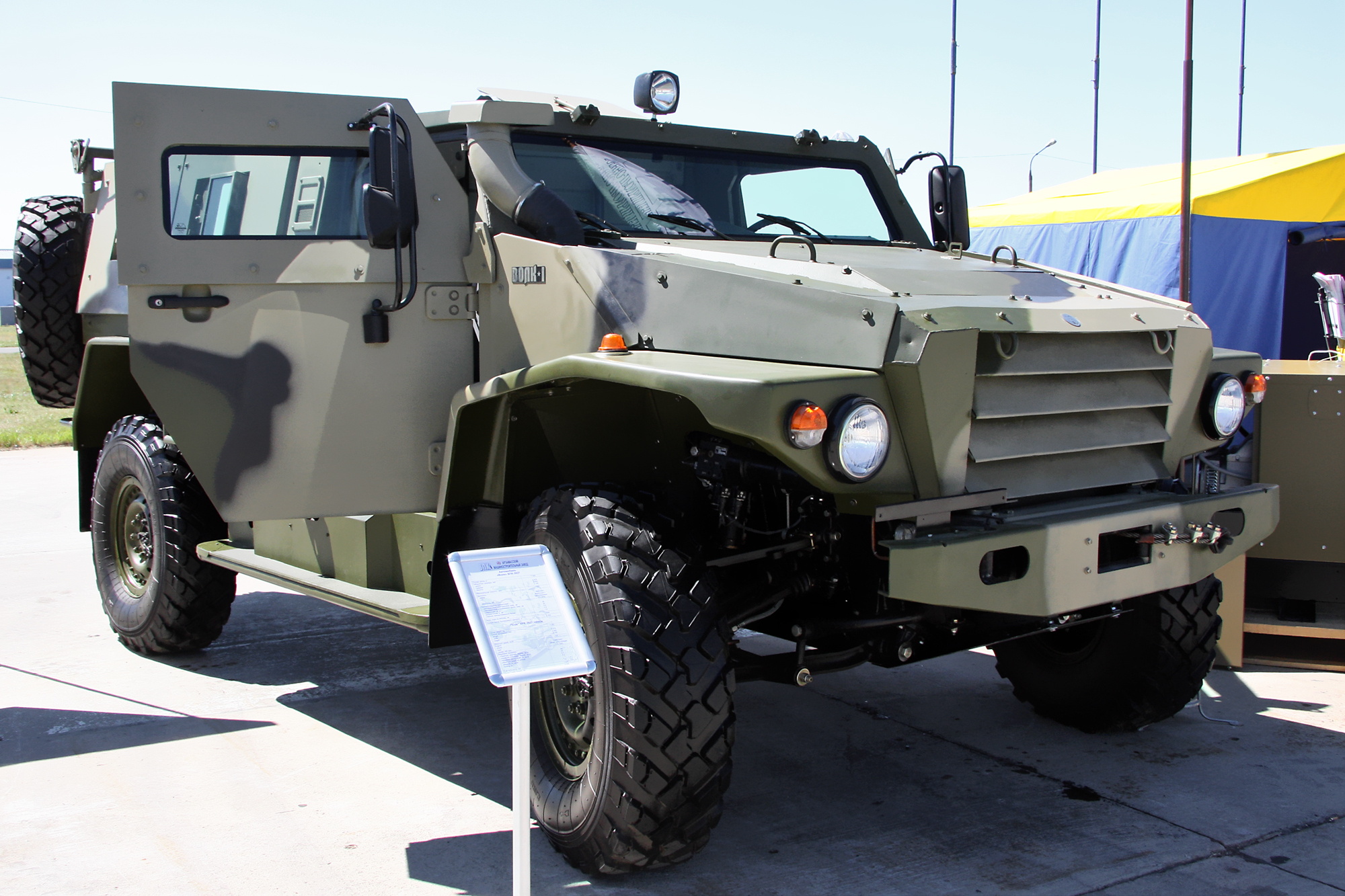
VPK -3927 Volk with armored personnel carrier module

In 2010, an international forum in Zhukovsky publicly presented three prototypes of a modular all-wheel drive family of vehicles, called the MIC-3927 Volk (the Russian word Volk (Волк) translates to Wolf). Like the Tigr, it was developed by the Military Industrial Company of Russia.

The Volk is available as a 4×4 (MIC-3927) or 6×6 (MIC-39273) and has increased bulletproofing (Class 6A to GOST 50963-96) and mine protection (STANAG Level 2a/2b).

In 2012, orders of the Tigr were cancelled in favour of the Volk; however, orders were resumed.

=== UAE ===
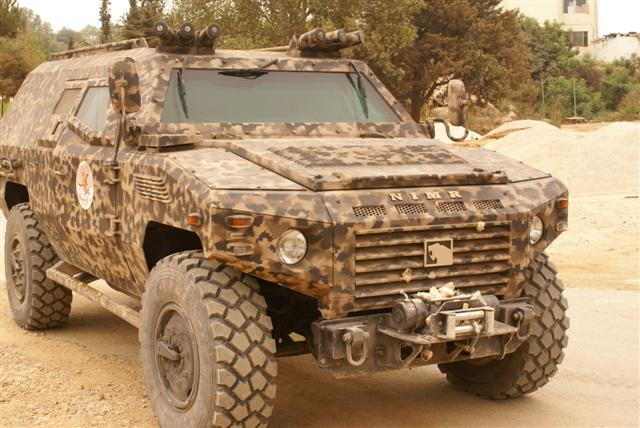
Lebanese Army Nimr II

After the refusal of the Arab company BJG to continue work on the project with the Russian company PKT, each of the parties was left with a package of technical documentation; in addition, three prototypes of armored vehicles remained in Abu Dhabi, which after being exhibited at IDEX-2001 were tested in desert conditions. Soon in Al-Dulaila, Jordan, by order of the UAE General Staff, BJG and KADDB created a joint venture, Advanced Industries of Arabia (AIA, 80% of shares in BJG), at whose plant, starting in June 2005, the 500 Nimr armored vehicles in four different versions, including a 6x6 wheel arrangement with a load capacity of 5 tons. Compared to the prototypes, the new machines are equipped with an MTU 6R 106 engine with 325 hp. s., Allison LCT 1000 transmission and differ in armored body geometry and conventional spring wheel suspension. The base version Nimr cars were first demonstrated in 2005 at the IDEX-2005 exhibition, where BJG announced the signing of an agreement with the Indian Vectra Group to create a joint production of these cars in India (however, no production of Nimr cars has yet begun in India). In 2007, at the IDEX-2007 exhibition, AIA demonstrated the Nimr II family of machines, developed on its own initiative, which is a further development of the basic version of the Nimr machine. Among the improvements were stated: all-round ballistic protection brought to level 3 B6 of the STANAG 4569 standard; basic mine protection against mine explosions weighing up to 6 kg; increased from 320 to 350 l. With. engine power; lifting capacity increased to 2.5 tons. Apart from the wheels, engine and gearbox, all components of the Nimr platform, including the driveline, chassis and armor, were designed and manufactured by BJG.

== Operators ==
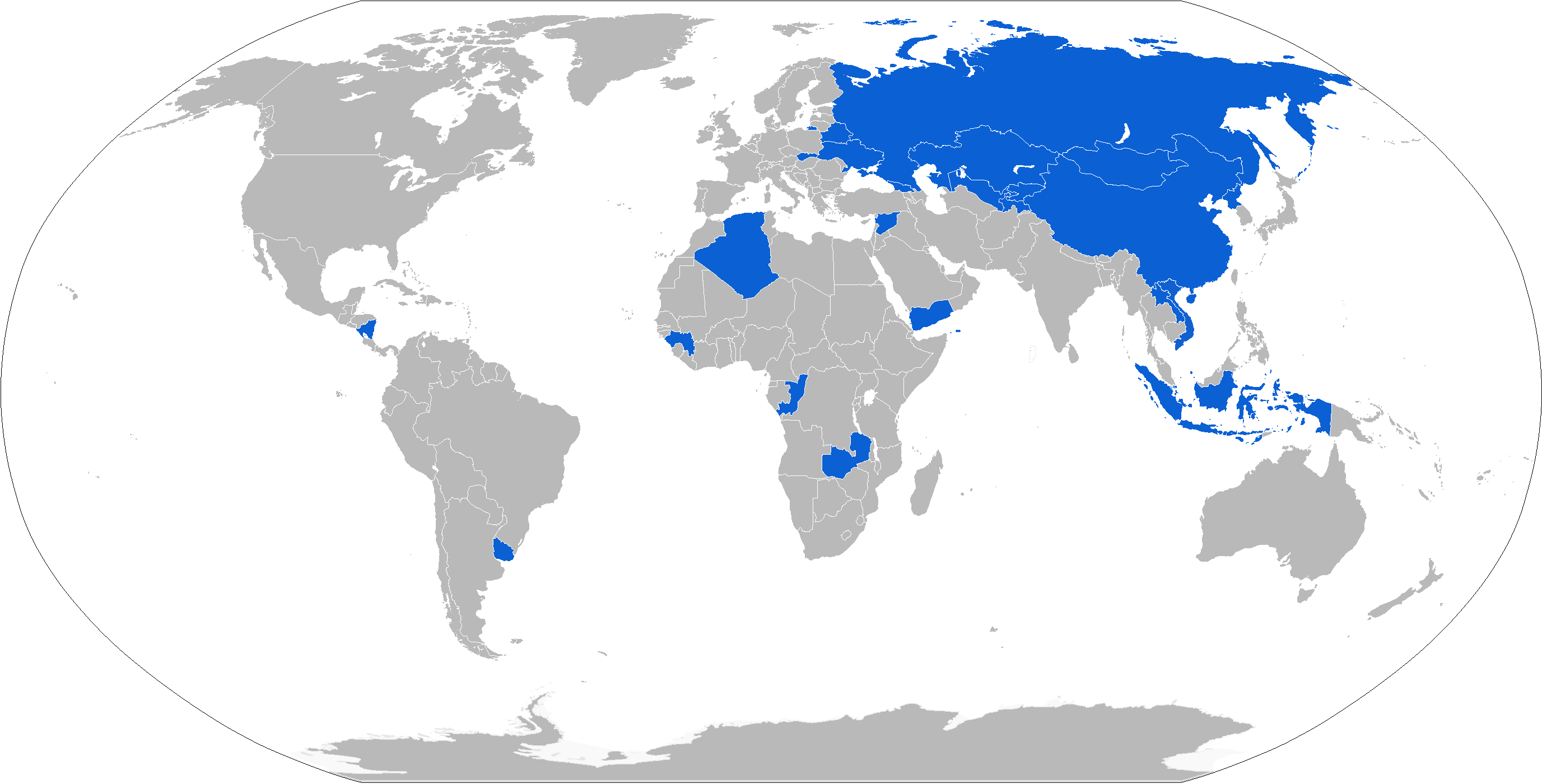
Map of Tigr operators in blue.

=== Current ===
- Algeria
- Armenia: Used by the Armenian Army.
- Belarus: Known to be used by Belarusian special forces units, including the Internal Troops of Belarus.
- Chad: Reported to be in use in the Chadian military.
- China: In Chinese service, it's known as the YJ2080 Sentinel. 110 YJ2080s delivered from 2008 to 2010, currently in service with the Ministry of Public Security.
- Congo: Tigrs are in use by the Congolese National Police. Tigrs used by Congolese military seen in a parade on August 15, 2022.
- Guinea: 3 Tigrs were known to be purchased for the Guinean Presidential Guard in 2011.
- Kazakhstan
- Kyrgyzstan: 55 purchased for Border Service in March 2022.
- Libya: Reported to be in Libyan military service with the Libyan Army.
  - Libyan National Army: 4 Tigrs were handed to the LNA by Wagner group.
- Mongolia: Used by special police units.
- Nicaragua: An agreement was signed in 2012 to supply Tigrs. It is not known how many were produced for Nicaragua.
- Russia: >2,000. Purchases were discontinued in 2012 in favour of the Wolf, but orders were later resumed. 500 vehicles were placed into service by 2011. 20 Tigr-Ms with Arbalet-DM combat module were delivered in 2016. Known service users include the Russian Army and the Russian Naval Infantry. Russian airborne forces were equipped with Tigr-Ms. 175 Tigr-Ms were delivered in 2018–19.
- Slovakia: In August 2016, Slovakia purchased the Tigr for the Slovak Police Force. In the ShieldAfrica2017 defense convention, Corvus Slovakia has acquired the rights to manufacture and market the Tigr to overseas buyers.
- Tajikistan
- Ukraine: As of 19 December 2024, 8 Tigrs and 29 Tigr-Ms were confirmed to have been captured from the Russian Army during the 2022 invasion of Ukraine. Some of the captured vehicles have been pressed into service with the Ukrainian Armed Forces.
- Uruguay: Three Tigrs were delivered to the Uruguayan Republican Guard in April 2011 for $600,000. They are equipped with bull bars, air conditioning, window grilles and a video surveillance system. Three Tigrs were delivered in February 2017 to the National Police of Uruguay. There were 10 Tigr vehicles in use by the URG in late 2017.
- Uzbekistan: VPK-233136 "Tiger" vehicles purchased for Uzbek special forces, equipped with PKMs, in June 2019.
- Yemen: Yemeni Republican Guard.
- Zambia: 35 supplied and used by the Zambian Army.

=== Non-state ===
- Syrian opposition

=== Evaluation-only ===
- Brazil: The Military Police of Rio de Janeiro State in September 2010 received a 4×4 armored GAZ-233036 TIGR model for testing until March 2011.
- India: 2 Tigrs ordered for field tests in 2008.
