= Law enforcement in the Republic of the Congo =

The law enforcement in the Republic of the Congo is monitored by two organisations Congolese national gendarmerie (Gendarmerie nationale congolaise, a French-style gendarmerie) and the Congolese national police (police nationale congolaise, not to be confused with the Congolese National Police of the Democratic Republic of the Congo).

Secret police organizations include the Direction Générale de la Sécurité d'État (DGSE) (Directorate-General of State Security).
