= Registered office =

Main address of a firm

A registered office, also known as registered address or legal address is the official address of an incorporated company, association or any other legal entity. Generally, it will form part of the public record and is required in most countries where the registered organization or legal entity is incorporated. A registered physical office address is required for incorporated organizations to receive official correspondence and formal notices from government departments, investors, banks, shareholders, and the public, in most countries in the world.

In international law, several theories are applied, the most common of which are: 1) The theory of state registration (incorporation) — a company’s legal relations are governed by the laws and regulations of the country in which it is registered. 2) The theory of the "real seat" (or "true location") — the country in which a company is incorporated must coincide with the country where it is located or from which it is actually managed.

According to the University of Latvia, from the perspective of public interest, a commercial entity’s registered address does not necessarily have to coincide with its state of incorporation or the place from which it is actually managed.

There are three different concepts that are similar yet distinguished:

- Registered legal address: The address officially recorded in the government company register.
- Actual business address: Where the company's employees and business operations are physically located.
- Mailing address: Where the company receives correspondence.

These addresses do not necessarily have to be identical, depending on national law.

A virtual office or mail-forwarding address should not automatically be assumed to satisfy registered-office requirements.

Some firms provide legal addresses for the registration of business entities without an actual physical office space. Such addresses are often referred to as "fictitious" or "paper" legal addresses—situations where the tenant has neither access to the premises nor a formal lease agreement. Using such addresses can lead to a rejection of the entity's registration or a refusal to register it for tax purposes.

== Worldwide ==
In many other countries, the address with which a company is registered must be where its headquarters or seat is located, and this will often determine the subnational registry at which the company must be registered.

=== Germany ===
In Germany the term Geschäftsanschrift is defined by the law. For a GmbH or AG the company must have a registered legal seat (Sitz) in Germany. It must have a domestic business address (inländische Geschäftsanschrift). The address must be suitable for receiving formal legal correspondence and service of documents. A commercial office, rented premises or an appropriately arranged office address may be used. The registered business address and legal seat are separate legal concepts and should not be confused.

=== India ===
In India, Section 12(1) of the Companies Act, 2013 mandates all companies to have a registered office within 15 days of incorporation. Additionally, companies are required to have a signboard or painted name and registered address outside every office in a conspicuous location.

=== Ireland ===
In Ireland, section 50 of the Companies Act 2014 requires every company to maintain a registered office in the state. The address must be a physical location to enable people to visit the company's registered office for document and register inspection purposes, and also to enable document delivery by hand.

=== Russia ===
In Russia, the term legal address (Russian: Юридический адрес) is deeply embedded in business parlance and officially defined by the law as Address of legal entity (Russian: Адрес юридического лица)

In common usage, it is often treated as a synonym for the postal address (location) of a legal entity’s permanent executive body, the address through which the entity can be contacted. No direct equivalent for this term exists in the legal systems of other countries.

However, under Federal Law No. 129-FZ of August 8, 2001, "On State Registration of Legal Entities and Individual Entrepreneurs" (specifically Chapter 3, Article 8, Clause 2), a legal entity—or organization—is required to be physically present at its registered address. This complicates the use of a mere "postal address", as the Federal Taxation Service conducts post-registration checks to verify that the entity is actually located at the address provided to the registration authority and recorded in the Unified State Register of Legal Entities (EGRUL). Following such a check, a report is drawn up confirming whether or not the entity is present at the registered location. If a violation is discovered, the tax authorities initiate measures to terminate the entity’s financial and business operations across all areas.

Although current Russian legislation does not define the term "legal address", it has become firmly established in business usage and even appears, at times, in official documents.

The validity of the term legal address is questionable for at least two reasons:

- A legal subject (a person or entity) cannot, by definition, have an "address"; only an object of law—specifically, a piece of real estate—can have an address.
- In everyday language, people refer not only to the "address of a legal entity" but also to the "address of an individual". This represents an equally incorrect use of the term address. Neither a natural person nor a legal entity has an address. Instead, they have a place of residence (or a place of stay/location), which in turn may have an address.

Given its abstract nature, a legal entity cannot, in principle, have a "location" that possesses an address; it exists within an unbounded space. A legal entity may own specific property that has a defined address (such as real estate), or it may be present at a specific address at a given moment in time. However, as a legal subject rather than an object of law, a legal entity cannot have an address in the legal sense, not even an address of location.

The civil legislation of the Russian Federation introduces a conventional concept known as the "location" (Russian: место нахождения) of a legal entity. According to Article 54 of the Civil Code of the Russian Federation, this "location" is defined as the place where the legal entity is state-registered. State registration, in turn, is carried out at the location of the entity’s permanent executive body—or, in the absence of such a body, at the location of another body or individual authorized to act on behalf of the legal entity without a power of attorney.

The term "address" is not used in this context. The legislator intentionally employs the conventional concept of a legal entity’s "location", defined solely by the place of its state registration—without linking it to a specific address.м

==== Actual and Legal Addresses ====
The term "actual address"—frequently used in everyday parlance alongside the term "legal address"—is not a legal term. A legal entity cannot have an "address", let alone two—a "legal" one and an "actual" one. The Unified State Register of Legal Entities contains an entry regarding the address of the location of a legal entity’s permanent executive body (for example, its director), which serves as the point of contact for the entity. There are no other types of "addresses" in the Unified State Register of Legal Entities.

Meanwhile, under Federal Law No. 129-FZ of August 8, 2001, "On State Registration of Legal Entities and Individual Entrepreneurs", if there is a change in the information regarding a legal entity included in the Unified State Register of Legal Entities, the entity is required to notify the registering authority—in the prescribed manner—within three business days so that the corresponding updates can be made to the Unified State Register of Legal Entities. This applies in particular to information regarding the address of the legal entity’s permanent executive body. Consequently, even if one interprets a registered address (legal address) as the location of a legal entity’s permanent executive body, any discrepancy between this registered address and the actual physical location of that body cannot persist for more than three business days. Failure to comply with this procedure entails liability as provided for under Article 14.25 of the Code of Administrative Offenses of the Russian Federation.

=== Singapore ===
In Singapore, section 142 of the Companies Act 1967 requires every company to maintain a registered office within Singapore from the date of incorporation. The office is the address to which communications and notices may be sent and must be open and accessible to the public for at least three hours during ordinary business hours on each business day. ACRA states that changes to the registered office address or office hours must be reported within 14 days.

A company's registered office is distinct from a contact address, which applies to individual position holders such as directors and company secretaries. A contact address is displayed in ACRA's public records and may be used instead of the individual's residential address, subject to ACRA's requirements.

=== United Kingdom ===
In the United Kingdom, the Companies Act 2006 requires all companies to have a registered office. Documents may be served on companies by delivery to the registered office address as recorded at Companies House. A registered office address is required for incorporated organizations to receive official correspondence and formal notices from government departments, investors, banks, shareholders, and the public. The registered office address does not have to be where the organization conducts its actual business or trade, and it is not unusual for law firms, accountants or incorporation agents to provide the registered office address service. A company's registered name must be visible to the public at its registered office, although there is an exception for people running a business from their home. Companies must include their registered office address on all communications, such as letters, and on their websites.

A company's statutory records previously had to be kept at the registered office and available for public inspection; since 1 October 2009, it has been possible for companies to designate a single alternative inspection location (SAIL) as a place to keep their records which must be available for public inspection. Since June 2016, private companies can elect to keep certain records on the central register which is held and published by Companies House, instead of maintaining their own registers.

A company must indicate in which of the United Kingdom's three jurisdictions its registered office is to be located: England and Wales, Scotland, or Northern Ireland. Companies incorporated in Wales may elect for their registered office address to be recorded as in Wales rather than in England and Wales. Under regulations implemented in the UK on 1 October 2009, company directors may now also use a registered office address instead of their private home address for contact on the Companies House register.

== See also ==
- Administrative address
- Company register
- Mass registration address
