= BTR-90 =

Russian armoured personnel carrier

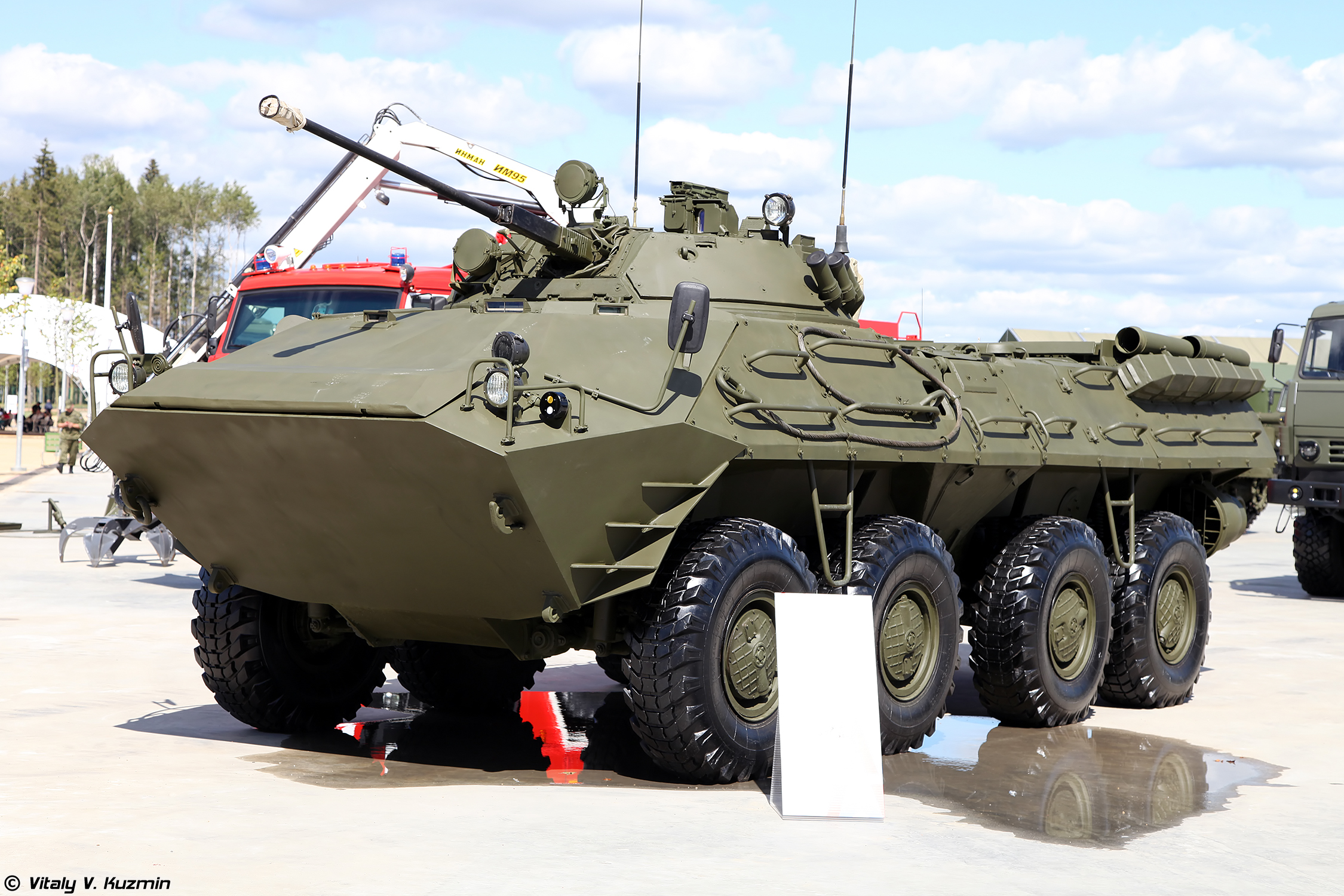
- BTR-90 on static display
- Type: Armoured personnel carrier
- Place of origin: Russia

Service history
- In service: 2008–present
- Wars: Russia-Ukrainian War

Production history
- Designed: 1993–1994
- Produced: 2004–2011
- No. built: 12 – 139

Specifications
- Mass: 20.9 tonnes (23.0 short tons; 20.6 long tons)
- Length: 7.64 m (25 ft 1 in)
- Width: 3.20 m (10 ft 6 in)
- Height: 2.98 m (9 ft 9 in)
- Crew: 3 (+7 infantry)
- Armor: Welded steel with optional ERA modules
- Main armament: 30 mm Shipunov 2A42 cannon (500 rounds)
- Secondary armament: 7.62 mm PKT machine gun (2000 rounds), 9M113 Konkurs ATGM, one AGS-17D 30 mm automatic grenade launcher (400 rounds).
- Engine: turbocharged diesel 510 hp (380 kW)
- Power/weight: 24 hp/tonne (18 kW/tonne)
- Suspension: wheeled 8×8
- Operational range: 800 km (500 mi)
- Maximum speed: 100 km/h (62 mph); 9 km/h (5.6 mph) swimming

The BTR-90 (GAZ-5923) (Russian: бронетранспортёр, romanized: Bronetransportyor, lit. 'Armoured Transporter') is an 8×8 wheeled armoured personnel carrier developed in Russia, designed in 1993 and first shown publicly in 1994. It is a larger version of the BTR-80 vehicle, fitted with a BMP-2 turret.

Armour protection is improved compared with the BTR-80, giving protection from 14.5 mm projectiles over the frontal arc. It is armed with a 2A42 30 mm autocannon, a coaxial 7.62 mm PKT machine gun, an 9M113 Konkurs ATGM, as well as a AGS-17D 30 mm automatic grenade launcher.

Limited numbers have been produced and are in service with the National Guard of Russia.

== Development ==
The development of the BTR-90 was carried out at the Arzamas Machine Building Plant (AMZ), a subsidiary of the Military Industrial Company. Development commenced in the early 1990s, with the first prototype completed and displayed to the public in 1994. The vehicle was intended to be used by mechanized units of the Russian Ground Forces, as well as marine units of the Russian Navy, as a vehicle for providing fire support, transportation of personnel, surveillance, reconnaissance, and patrolling tasks. A wide range of vehicles suiting various requirements can be developed on the BTR-90 chassis.

The vehicle is designed to be highly mobile and maneuverable in all terrains, while providing a high level of protection for its crew and passengers. The BTR-90 is fitted with a gun turret identical to the one used on the BMP-2.

== Description ==
The BTR-90 has a pointed nose, somewhat similar to that of the LAV-25. The hull is made of welded steel armour plate, and is slightly larger and higher than the BTR-80, from which it is developed.

A turbocharged, liquid-cooled, multi-fuel diesel engine is used, which can develop 510 bhp. The vehicle has eight-wheel drive and has an automatic, reversible hydro-mechanical transmission, which is capable of providing different speeds to each side of the vehicle. It has duplicated electrical and compressed air engine start systems. The wheels use an independent torsion-bar suspension, and the traverse arms have high-capacity telescopic hydraulic shock absorbers.

Communication equipment installed in the BTR-90 include an R-163-50U radio set for external communications, an R-163UP receiver, and an R-174 intercom device for communication between the crew members.

=== Layout ===
The commander and gunner are accommodated in a fighting compartment in the turret. This compartment houses a BPK-3-42 gunner's day/night sight and a 1P-13 commander's optical sight. Optionally, a BPK-M thermal imaging sight can be fitted in this compartment as the gunner's sight.

The driver is located somewhat in the middle of the hull, just in front of the turret. The troop compartment is located behind the driver's position and the turret. The engine compartment is at the rear of the hull.

Hatches are provided on the top of the turret and hull, and side doors are available in the middle of the vehicle. These are designed to allow quick dismounting and boarding of troops even while the vehicle is on the move.

The eight wheels are located in two sets, with two pairs at the front of the hull and two pairs at the rear. Split-side doors are located between these two sets of wheels. The two forward pairs of wheels use power steering.

=== Capabilities and features ===
The BTR-90 is capable of achieving a maximum speed of 100 km/h and has cross-country driving ability comparable to that of tracked vehicles, with an average speed of 50 km/h.

The vehicle is fully amphibious and can negotiate water obstacles without any preparation. Two water jet propellers power the vehicle in water. In water, it can achieve a maximum speed of 9 km/h. It can enter and be deployed from amphibious assault ships from the water. The BTR-90 can be deployed by truck, rail, water, and air transportation means.

Its hydro-mechanical transmission helps to increase its maneuverability by providing different speeds to each side of the vehicle. This allows the BTR-90 to have a low turning radius of 6 m. When turning with only the front four wheels, it has a turning radius of 14 m. It can cross up to 2.1 m wide trenches and can negotiate 60% gradients, 30% side slopes, and 0.8 m vertical steps.

The vehicle has an inner capacity of 12 cubic meters and can carry a load of 7,000 kg. An air conditioning system can be added optionally. The commander has the ability to carry out all-around surveillance and, can take full control of the weapons from the gunner. An onboard information control system (OICS) enables automatic control over the transmission, engine and other important parts of the BTR-90, and it is the first armoured personnel carrier to have such a system. A centralized tire pressure control system is available, and allows the vehicle to move even if four of its wheels are destroyed.

=== Armour and protection ===
The armour of the BTR-90 comprises welded steel armour plates. The armour can withstand hits from 14.5 mm rounds over the frontal arc. The side armour can provide protection against large-calibre machine gun fire and shrapnel.

Additional armoured plates can be installed on the vehicle to increase protection. Active protection methods can be used, such as explosive reactive armour. These can be added over the existing armour of the vehicle. To increase protection, periscopes are installed instead of windscreens and vision blocks.

Collective NBC (Nuclear, Biological, and Chemical) protection is available which can protect the occupants from shock waves and penetrating radiation from nuclear attacks, radioactive dust, and bacteriological and chemical weapons.

Its combat tires are capable of enduring anti-personnel mine explosions and small arms fire. If the vehicle is damaged while afloat, a drainage system is capable of removing incoming water. The BTR-90 features an automatic firefighting system and a system for the remote laying of smoke screens. The smoke discharge system includes six smoke grenade launchers, three on each side of the vehicle.

=== Armament ===
The main gun of the BTR-90 is a 30 mm Shipunov 2A42 auto cannon. The vehicle carries an ammunition load of 500 rounds for this weapon.

A 7.62 mm PKT coaxial machine gun with 2,000 rounds and a 30 mm AGS-17 automatic grenade launcher are the secondary armaments of the BTR-90.

A guided missile system is available for engaging armoured targets. This consists of four 9M113 Konkurs missiles mounted on the turret. The launching unit is detachable and can be used to launch missiles from the ground.

All the weapons are mounted on the turret and are assisted by a fire control system. The fire control system allows the weapons to be used while the vehicle is moving, and in all weather conditions. The turret can be traversed 360 degrees with an elevation range of −5 to +75 degrees. The vehicle's weaponry allows it to engage targets at ranges up to 4 km. Helicopters and fortifications can be engaged at ranges up to 2.5 km.

In addition to the vehicle's weapons, its occupants have the ability to fire their weapons through available firing ports and hatches, increasing its firepower.

== Variants ==
- BTR-90 "Rostok" (БТР-90 «Росток») – standard variant
- BTR-90 "Berezhok" (БТР-90 «Бережок») – variant with the B05Ya01 "Berezhok" (Б05Я01 «Бережок») combat module, fitting the turret with a new fire control system, four 9M133 Kornet missile launchers on the turret sides, and a remote controlled AGS-30 30 mm grenade launcher on the roof
- BTR-90M (БТР-90М) – variant with a larger turret derived from the BMP-3, fitting the Bakhcha-U (Бахча-У) combat module, mounting a coaxial low-velocity 2A70 100 mm rifled gun/missile launcher system (which can fire conventional shells or laser beam-riding 9M117M1 "Arkan" or 9K117 "Agona" anti-tank missiles), a 30 mm Shipunov 2A72 cannon, and a 7.62mm PKT machine gun; first displayed publicly in 2001 and is not currently in service
- BMM "Sukhozhilie" (БММ «Сухожилие») – protected medivac ambulance by Pribor-Kontrol LLC; project begun in 1997 but was cancelled in 2006 due to the manufacturer failing twice to deliver a prototype in time
- MZ-187 (МЗ-187) – self-propelled artillery project, fitting the BTR-90 with the low-pressure 120 mm 2S9 Nona weapon as used on the BTR-80-based 2S23 Nona-SVK; cancelled due to subpar pros vs the existing 2S23 Nona-SVK

== Service history ==
Limited numbers have been produced and are in service with the National Guard of Russia.

In October 2011, the Ministry of Defence refused to buy the BTR-90 and did not include it in the list of the state program of armament until 2020, and waived exports for the BTR-90.

Subsequently, the Russian army chose to assemble a large number of BTR-82A. The combat effectiveness has already increased significantly, and it is derived from the BTR-80. The development cost for BTR-82A is omitted, and the production cost is cheaper, making the less advanced BTR-90 even less likely to change its fate. The 2015 Moscow Victory Parade exposed the next-generation VPK-7829 Bumerang wheeled armoured vehicle, and officially announced that the BTR-90 program could no longer be resurrected.

On October 13, 2023, a video was posted on X (formerly Twitter) showing a BTR-90 operating in what is believed to be near Avdiivka, Donetsk Oblast area in Ukraine. On December 11, 2023, a video was posted on X showing the first visually confirmed Russian loss of a BTR-90, abandoned by the Russians in the Avdiivka sector.

== Gallery ==
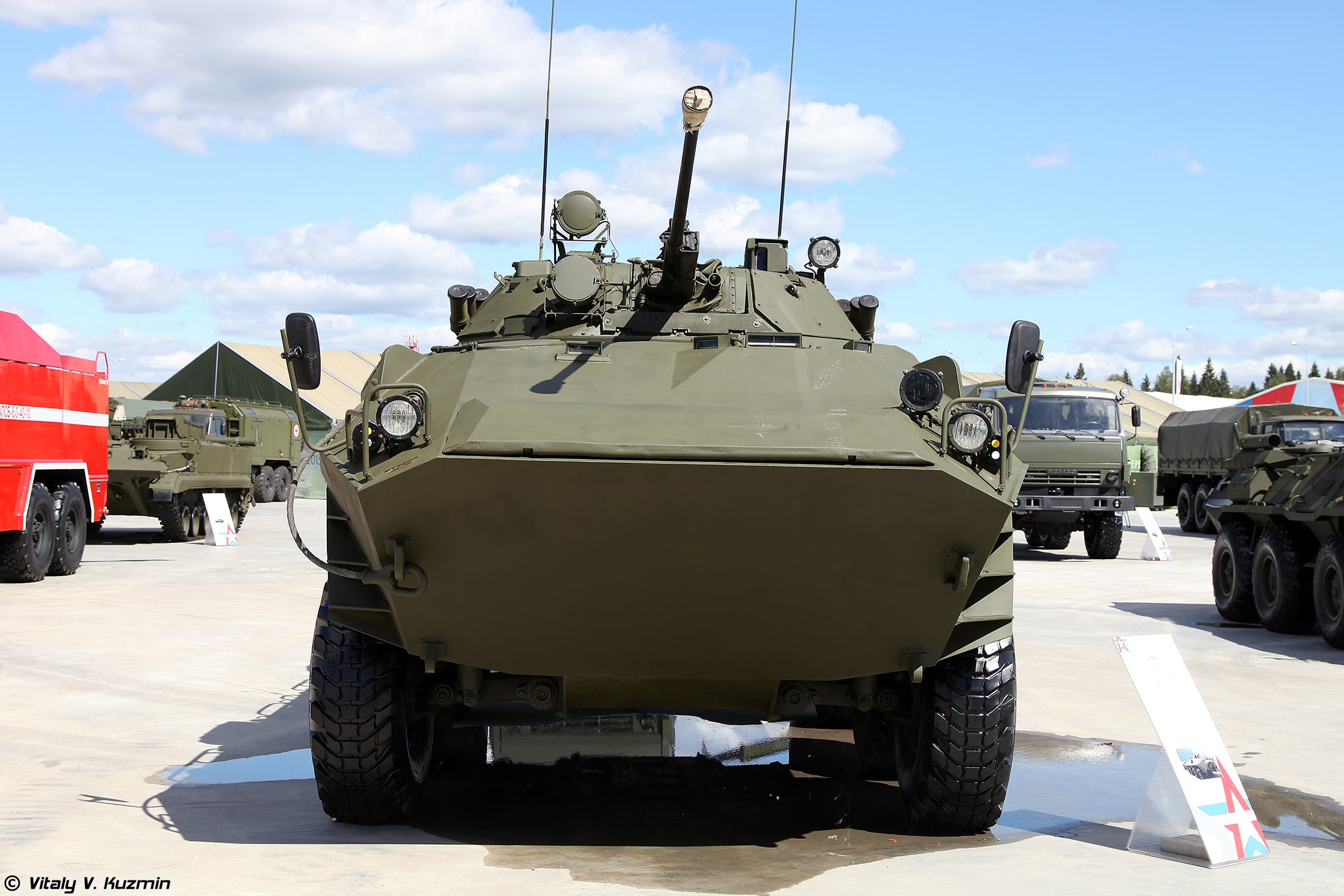
BTR-90 front

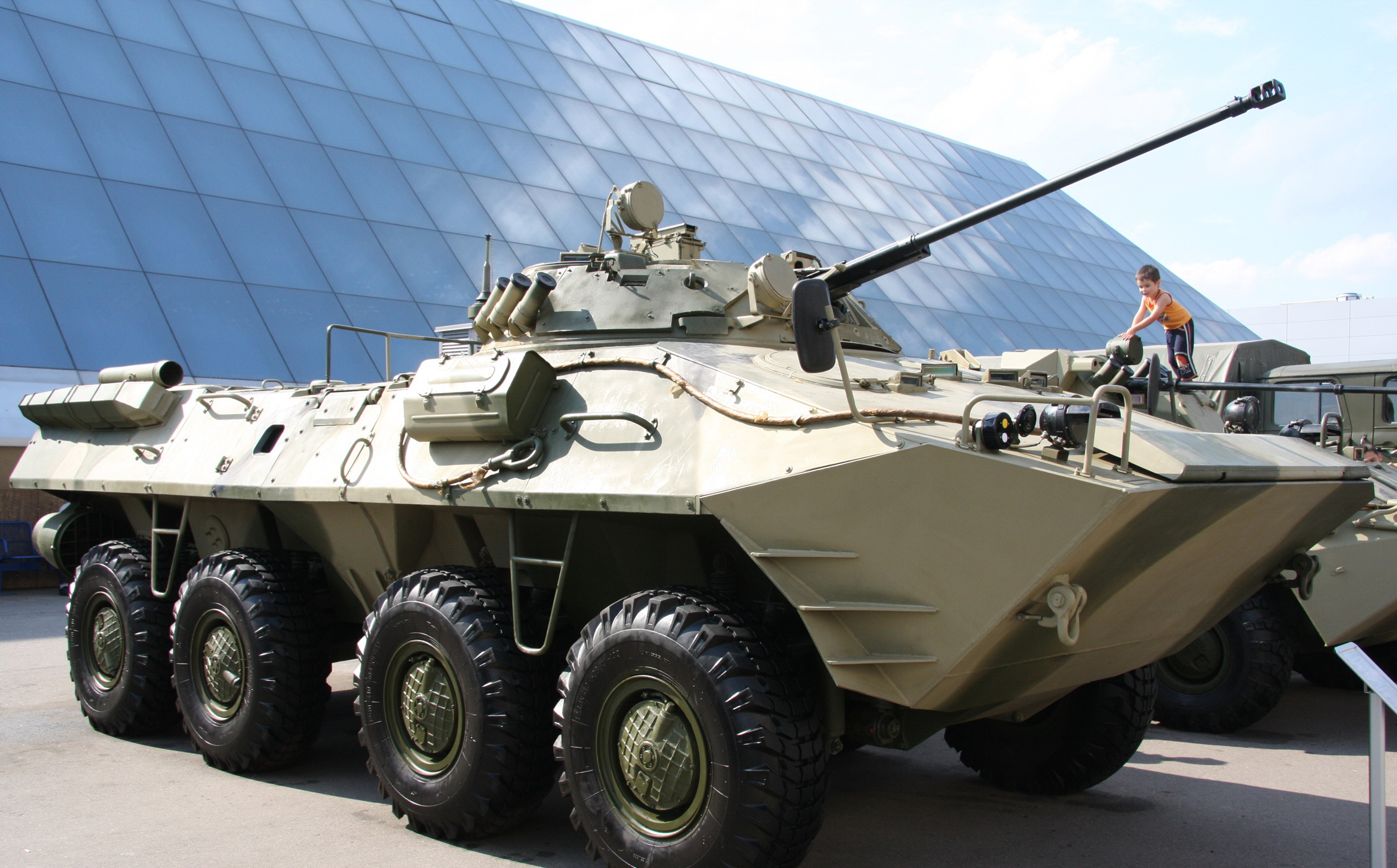
BTR-90 right front

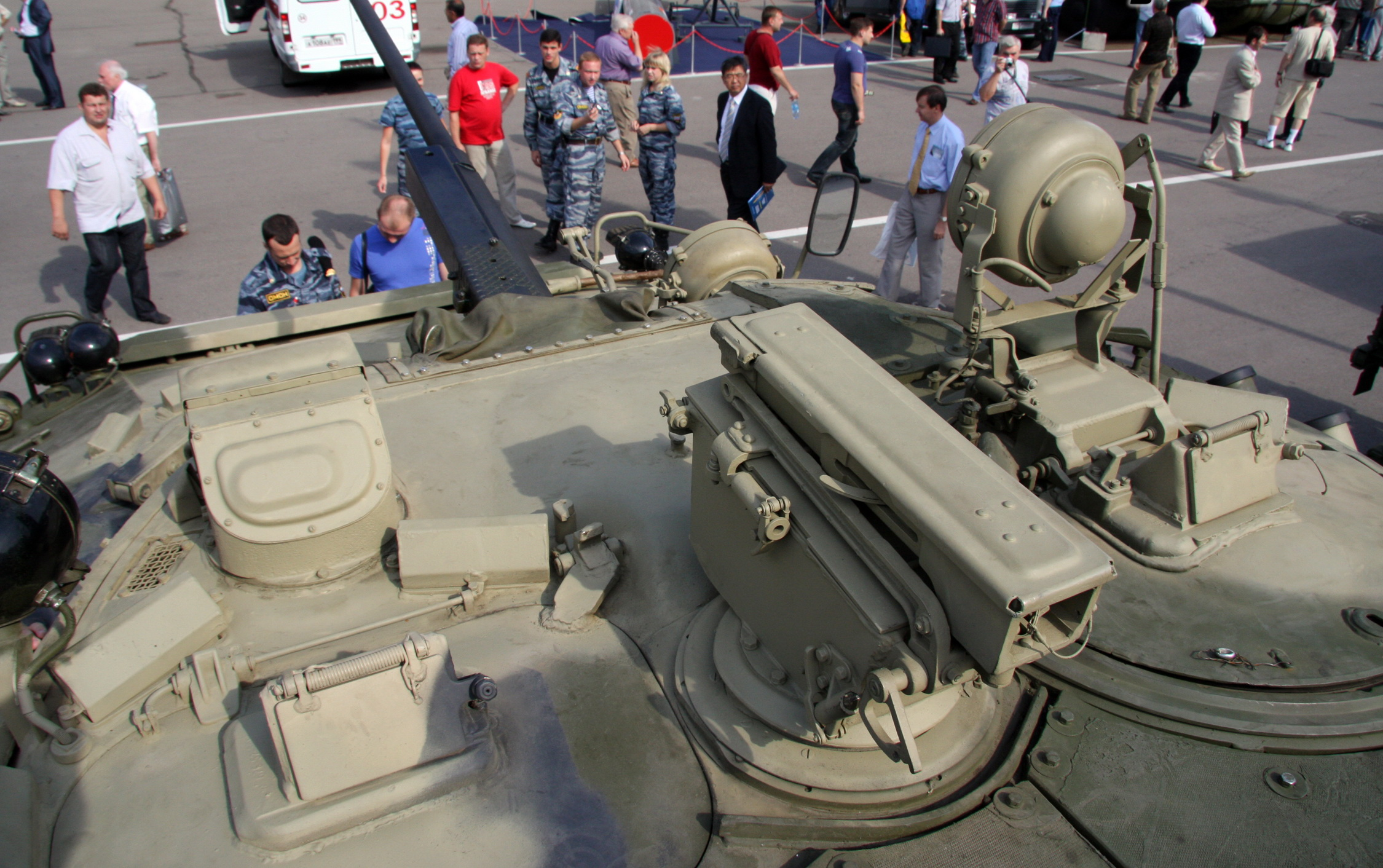
BTR-90 top forward from turret

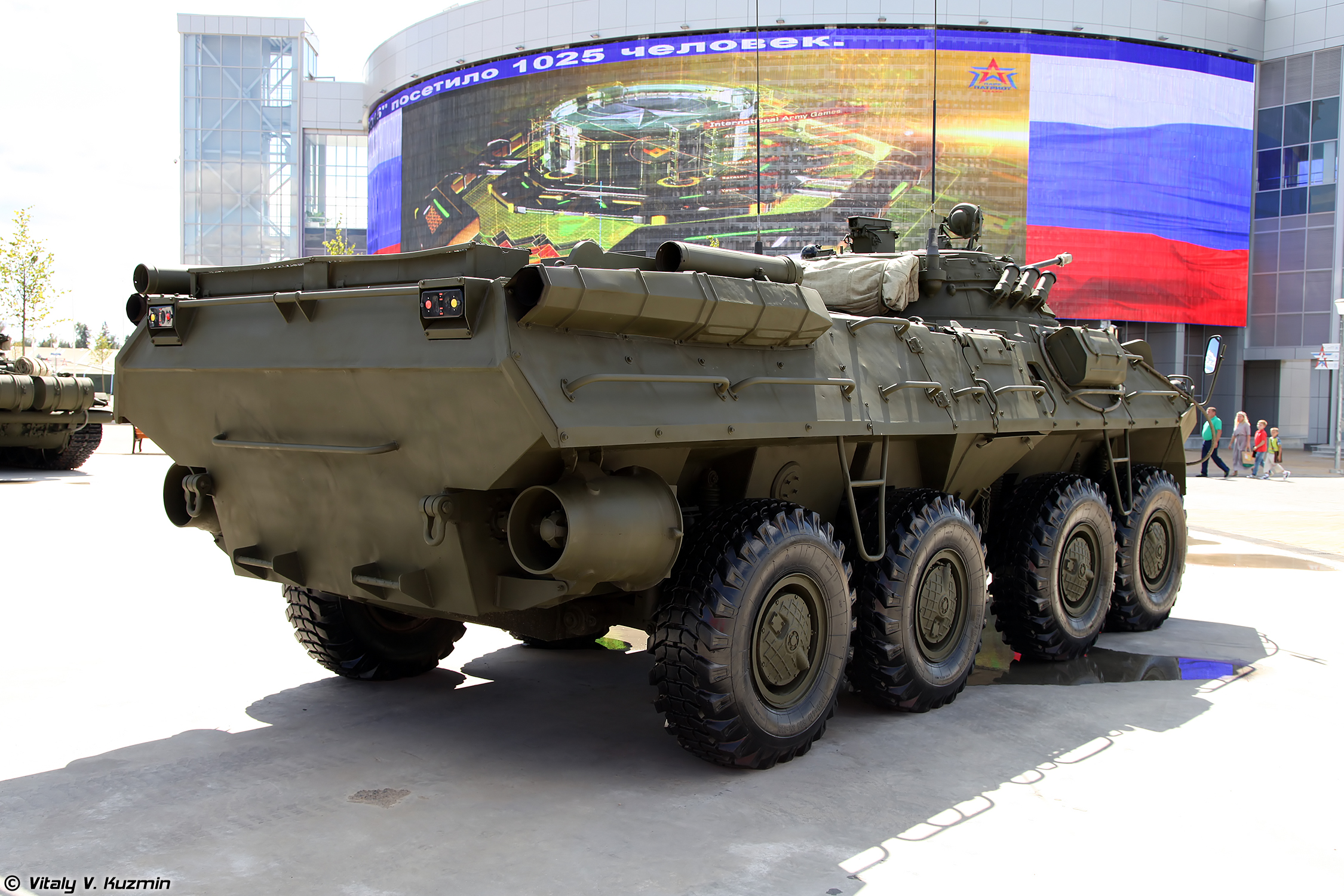
BTR-90 right rear

== See also ==
=== Comparable vehicles ===
- Stryker – (United States, Canada)
- General Motors LAV – (Canada)
  - LAV III – (Canada)
  - LAV-25 – (Canada)
  - ASLAV – (Australia)
- Amphibious combat vehicle – (United States)
- ZBL-08 – (China)
- K808 armored personnel carrier – (South Korea)
- Boxer – (Germany, Netherlands)
- Freccia IFV – (Italy)
- Clouded Leopard – (Taiwan)
- VPK-7829 Bumerang – (Russia)
- Type 96 armored personnel carrier – (Japan)
  - Type 16 maneuver combat vehicle – (Japan)
- Patria AMV – (Finland)
- BTR-4 – (Ukraine)
- Saur 2 – (Romania)
- VBCI – (France)
- KTO Rosomak – (Poland)
- FNSS Pars – (Turkey)
- MOWAG Piranha – (Switzerland)
- Otokar Arma – (Turkey)
