= VPK =

VPK is an acronym that may refer to:

- The Military-Industrial Commission of the USSR (1957–1991)
- Military Industrial Company, Russian manufacturer of armored military vehicles
- The Left Party (Sweden) (1917–present)
- Vata, Pitta and Kapha, the three doshas, according to Ayurveda
- Victoria Park railway station, Melbourne
- The Vest Pocket Kodak
