= VPK-3927 Volk =

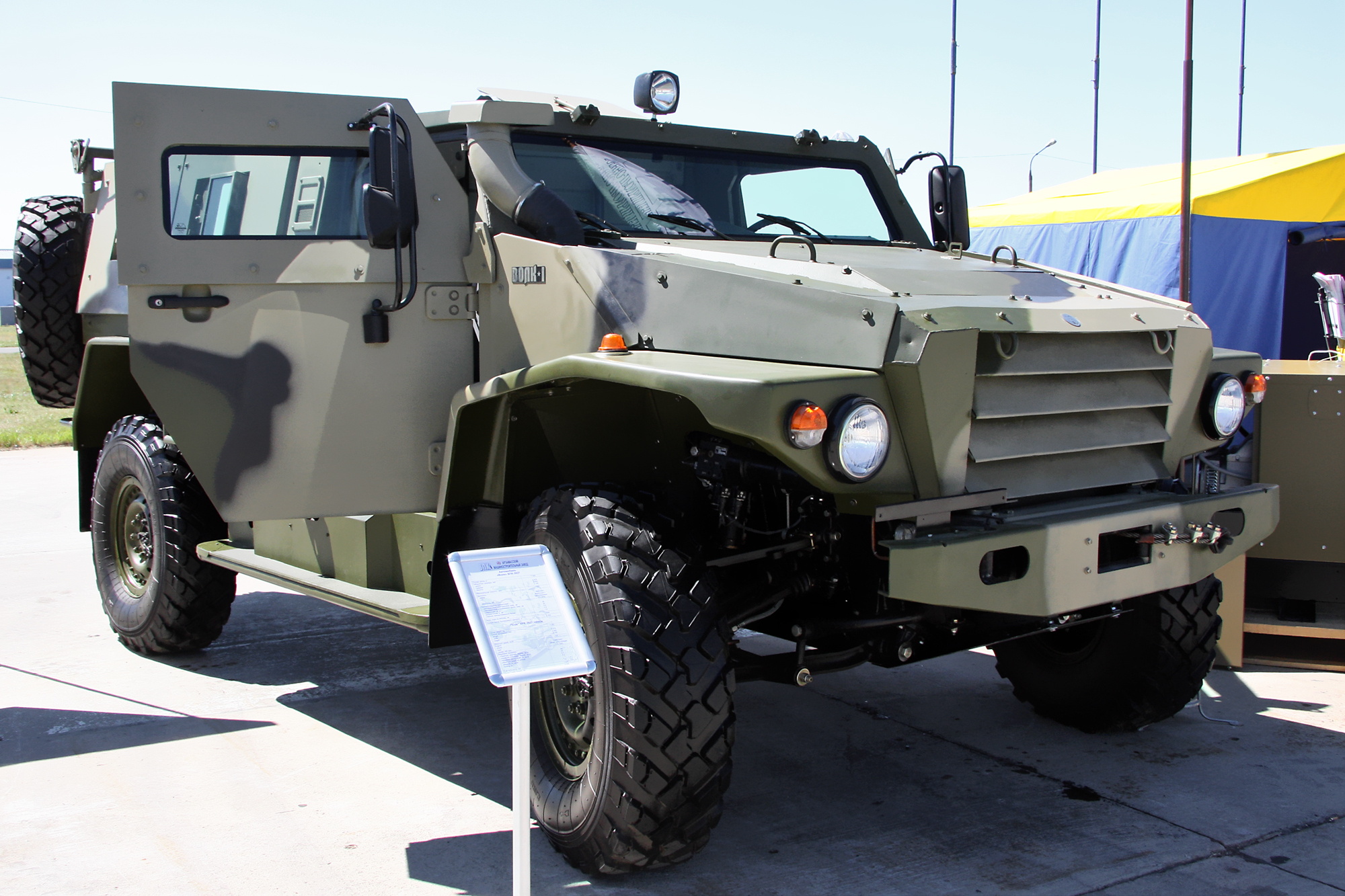
- Type: Infantry mobility vehicle
- Place of origin: Russia

Production history
- Designer: Military Industrial Company (VPK)
- Designed: 2010
- Variants: See variants

Specifications
- Mass: 10,200 kilograms (22,500 lb) armoured/7,000 kilograms (15,000 lb) unarmoured
- Length: 6,976 mm (22 ft 10.6 in) armoured/5,712 mm (18 ft 8.9 in) unarmoured
- Width: 2,500 mm (8 ft 2 in)
- Height: 2,100 mm (6 ft 11 in)
- Crew: 2+8
- Armor: STANAG 4569 Level 3 for armoured variants
- Engine: Cummins 5.9 L (360 cu in) B180 TD 6cyl, 180 hp (130 kW); 240–300 hp
- Power/weight: 23.5–31.5 hp/metric ton /34-43 hp/metric ton unarmoured
- Payload capacity: 4,500 kilograms (9,900 lb) armoured/2,500 kilograms (5,500 lb) unarmoured
- Drive: 4×4; 3,300 mm (10 ft 10 in) wheelbase 2,140 mm (7 ft 0 in) track width
- Suspension: Independent hydropneumatic with height adjustment
- Ground clearance: Adjustable 250 mm (9.8 in) to 550 mm (1 ft 10 in)
- Operational range: 1,000 km (620 mi)
- Maximum speed: 130 km/h (81 mph)

The VPK-3927 Volk (Russian: Волк; English: "Wolf") is a Russian 4×4 multipurpose military armoured vehicle, manufactured by Military Industrial Company. The Volk family was developed by modifying a previous model by Military Industrial Company, the Tigr.

The maximum speed of the vehicle is 130 km/h.

== History ==
The Volk debuted during the International Forum Engineering Technologies 2010 (IDELF-2010) from 30 June to 4 July 2010 in Zhukovsky, Russia.

Volk-produced armoured vehicles with 1.5-ton and 2.5-ton capacities were developed to comply with the needs of the Russian military and police. They incorporate modular design principles as to assist with existing and future domestic serial production.

Volk's armoured vehicles family consists of three groups: armoured, unarmoured and commercial civilian cars. The group of armoured vehicles includes the basic VPK-3927 which consists of a protected cabin and separate armoured functional back module, the VPK-39271 which has a whole protected functional module joint with cabin, the VPK-39272 which is designed to transport cargo and personnel with the ability for installation of various functional modules, and the VPK-39273 6x6 vehicle which has a protected cabin and separate functional rear module.

== Design ==
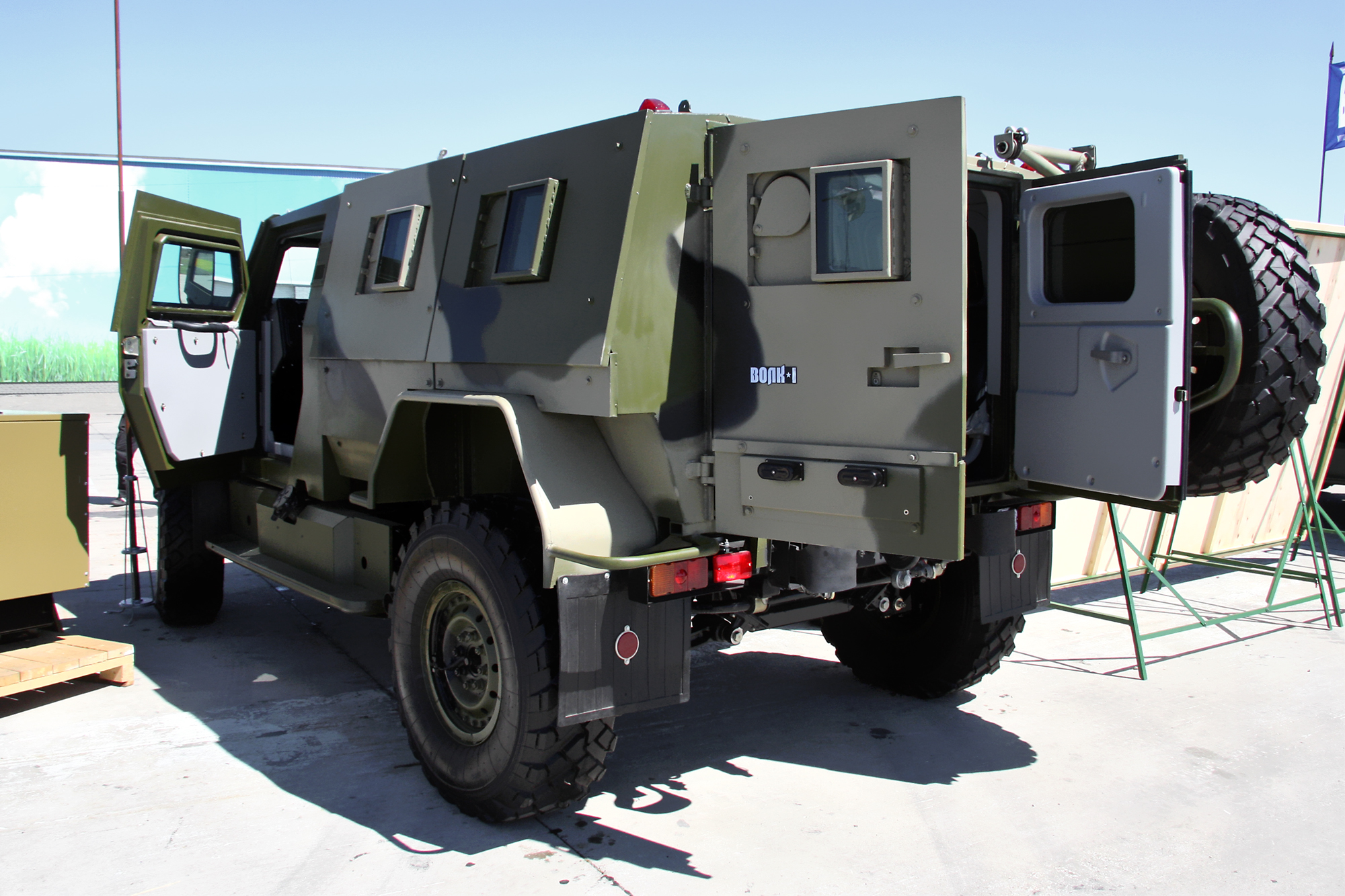
VPK-3927 Volk side view. Adjustable suspension is in the top position. Road clearance is 550 mm.

There are several new designs applied on Volk armoured vehicles: a unified platform, independent hydro-pneumatic suspension with height adjustment, enhanced protection of cabin, a new diesel engine YaMZ-5347, onboard information control system (BIUS), and a modular design.

The conception of protection for vehicles is based on the provision of the highest ballistic and mine protection of vehicles and personnel. The design of frame-panel armour provides its assembly and disassembly in field conditions without the use of special tools. Ballistic protection is STANAG 4569 level 3 with the possibility of increasing the level. Mine protection is 1 level (2 after upgrade).

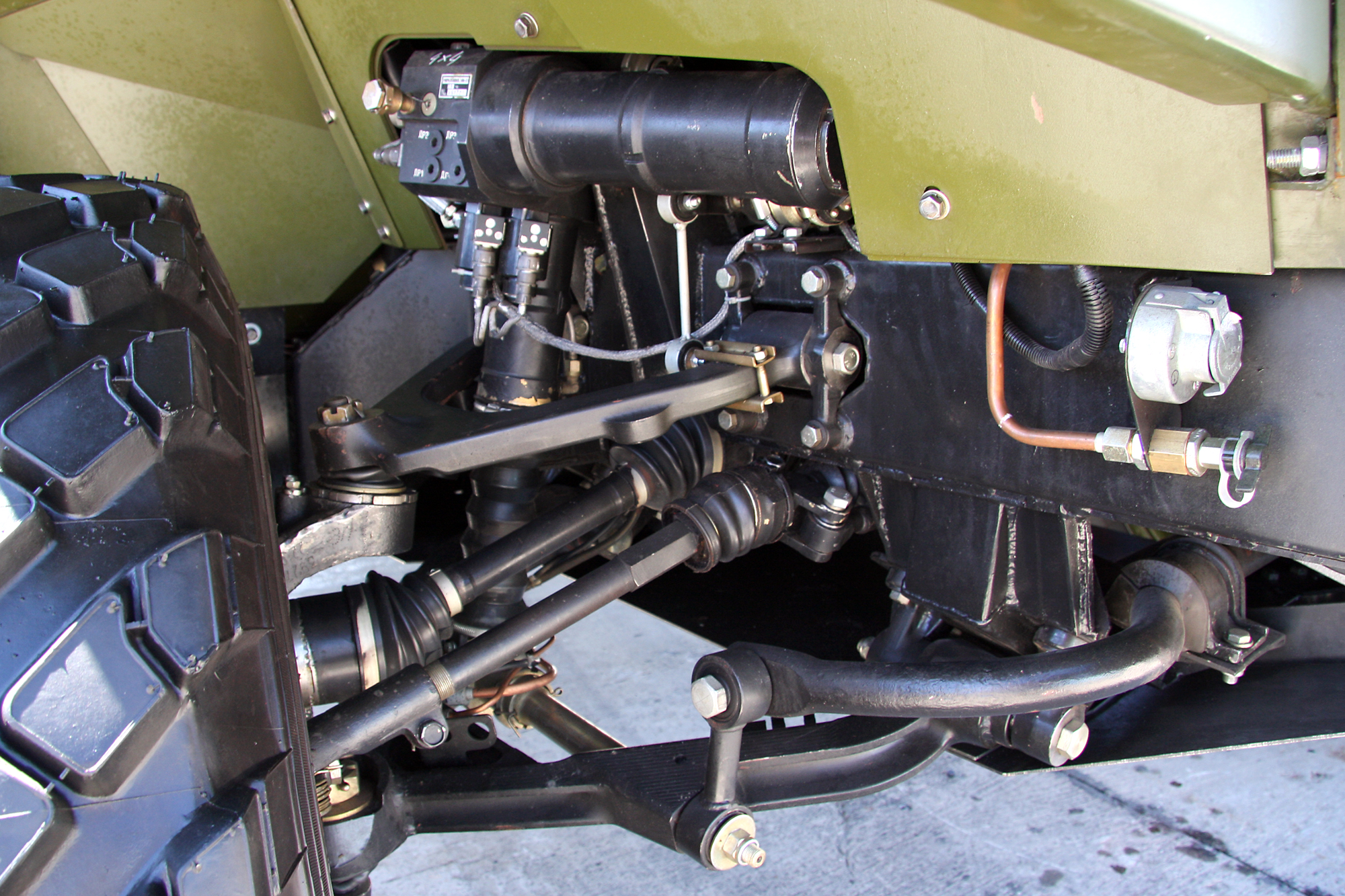
VPK-3927 Volk elements of active adjustable suspension

Volk vehicles have the advanced diesel engine YaMZ-5347 Euro-4. The engine has modernization reserve for power up to 300 hp. The transmission and transfer gearbox provides a resource of 250 thousand km with engine power of 240 hp.

Independent hydropneumatic suspension with height adjustment allows the driver to change the ground clearance from 250mm to 500mm and move off-road at speeds of up to 55–60 km/h.

The angle of the front and rear overhang varies depending on the position of the suspension from 45 to 55 degrees. The minimum turn radius is 7 meter.

The unification of the vehicles includes unified power units, cabins, suspension, transmission, onboard information control system and protection features. The internal volume of the cabin is 2.4 cubic meters, the functional module of the VPK-3927 vehicle is 4.7 cubic meters, the VPK-39271 mono space module is 7.2 cubic meters, and the volume of the VPK-39273 6x6 module is 10.3 cubic meters.

The Onboard Information Control System (BIUS) provides a control function and diagnosis of basic units and components of vehicles with a record of their parameters. The engine is controlled by 15 parameters: pressure, temperature, speed, fuel supply, cooling system, lubricating system, etc. Transmission and tires are controlled by temperature and pressure. The hydraulic and suspension adjustment system is controlled in 24 points. Malfunction of BIUS is not connected with the mobility of the vehicle.

== Variants ==
- VPK-3927 Volk — basic vehicle with protected cabin and separate armoured functional rear module.
- VPK-39271 Volk — armoured vehicle with a whole protected functional module joint with cabin.
- VPK-39272 Volk-2 — cargo and personnel transport vehicle with the ability for installation of various functional modules. This version of the Volk vehicle allows the use of a wide variety of functional modules, such as medic, jamming, signal or logistics modules.
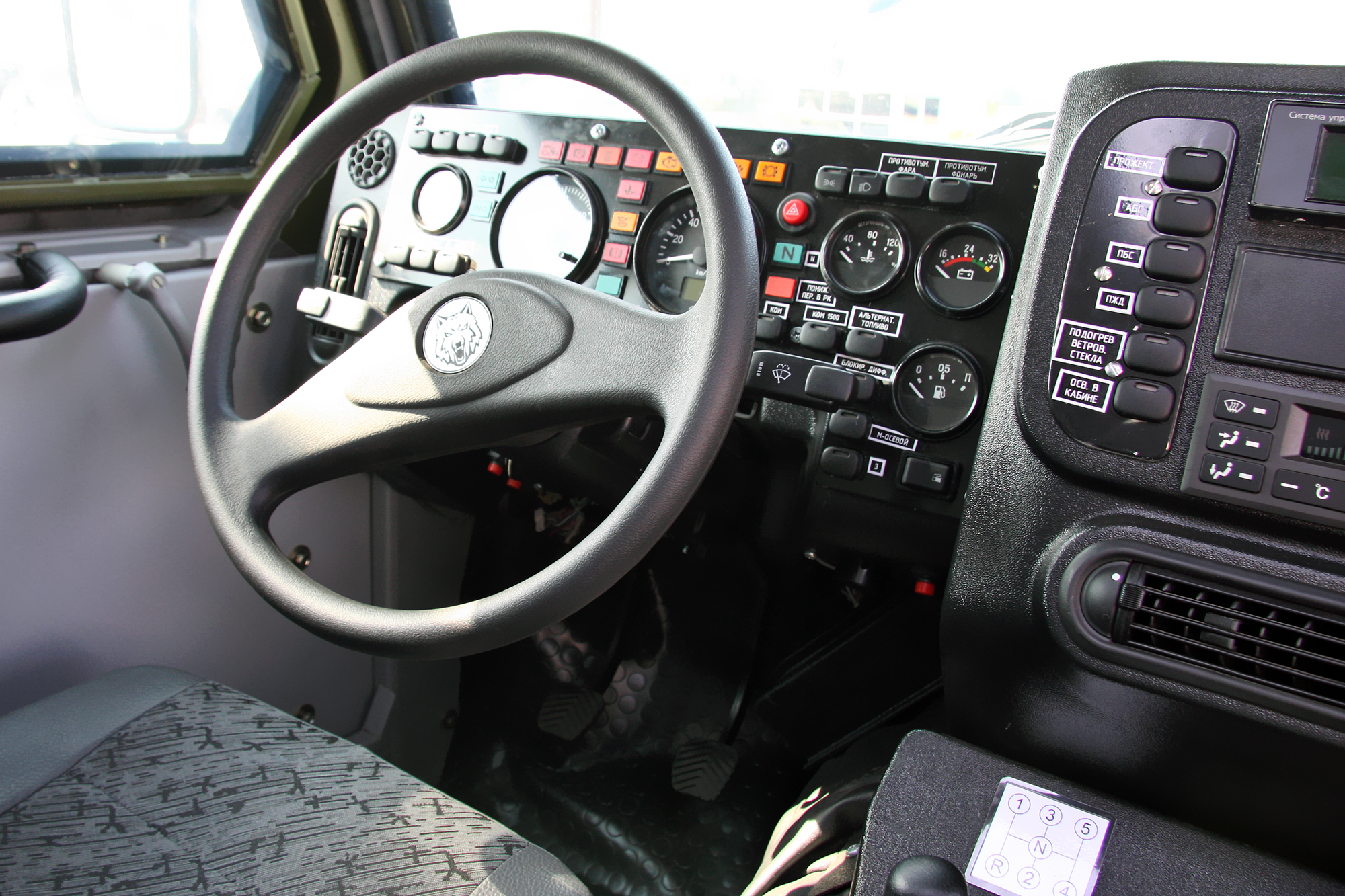
Volk Gage panel, steering, onboard information control system elements

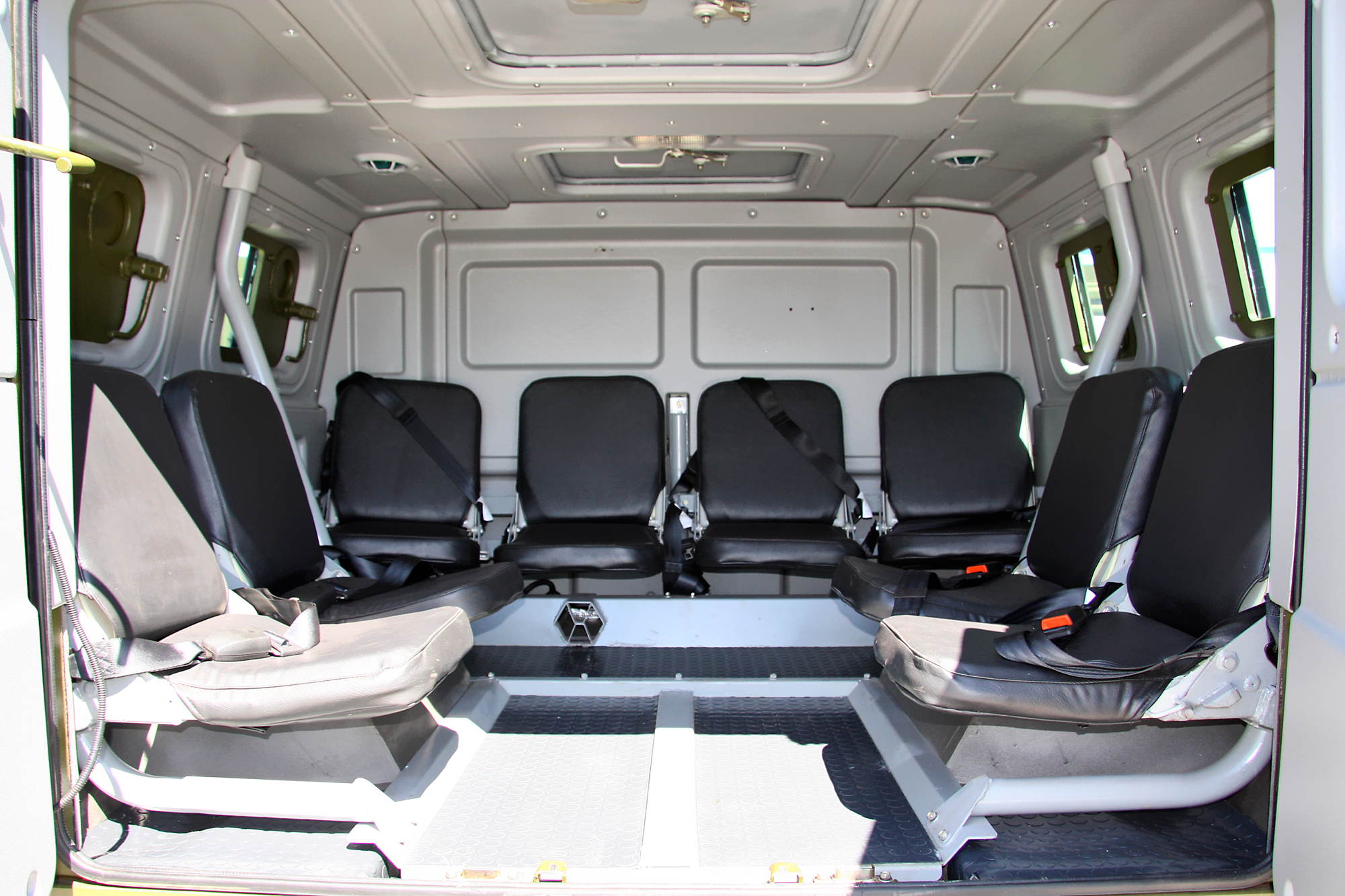
VPK-3927 Volk armoured functional module can carry 8 persons

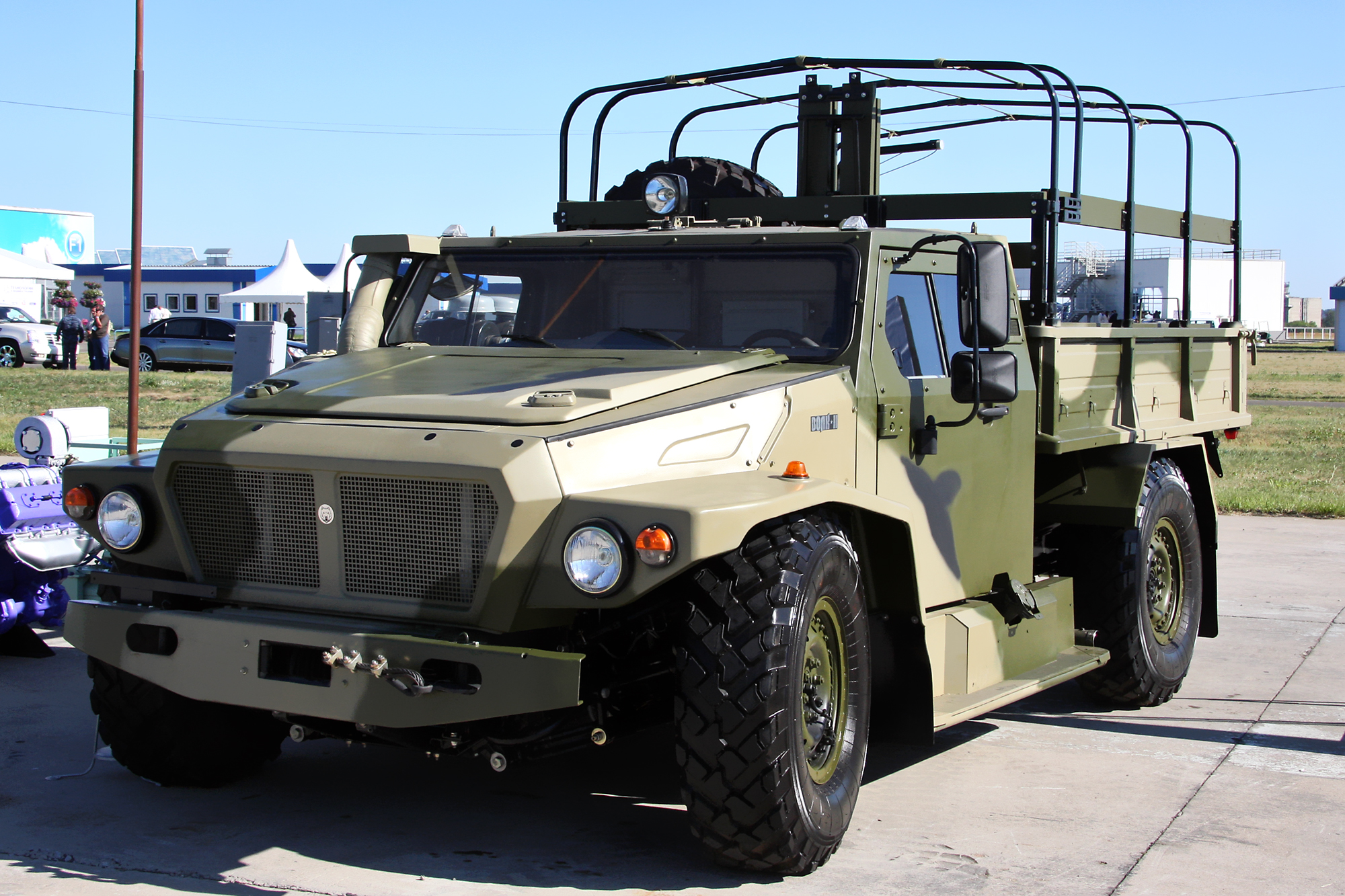
VPK-39272 front view

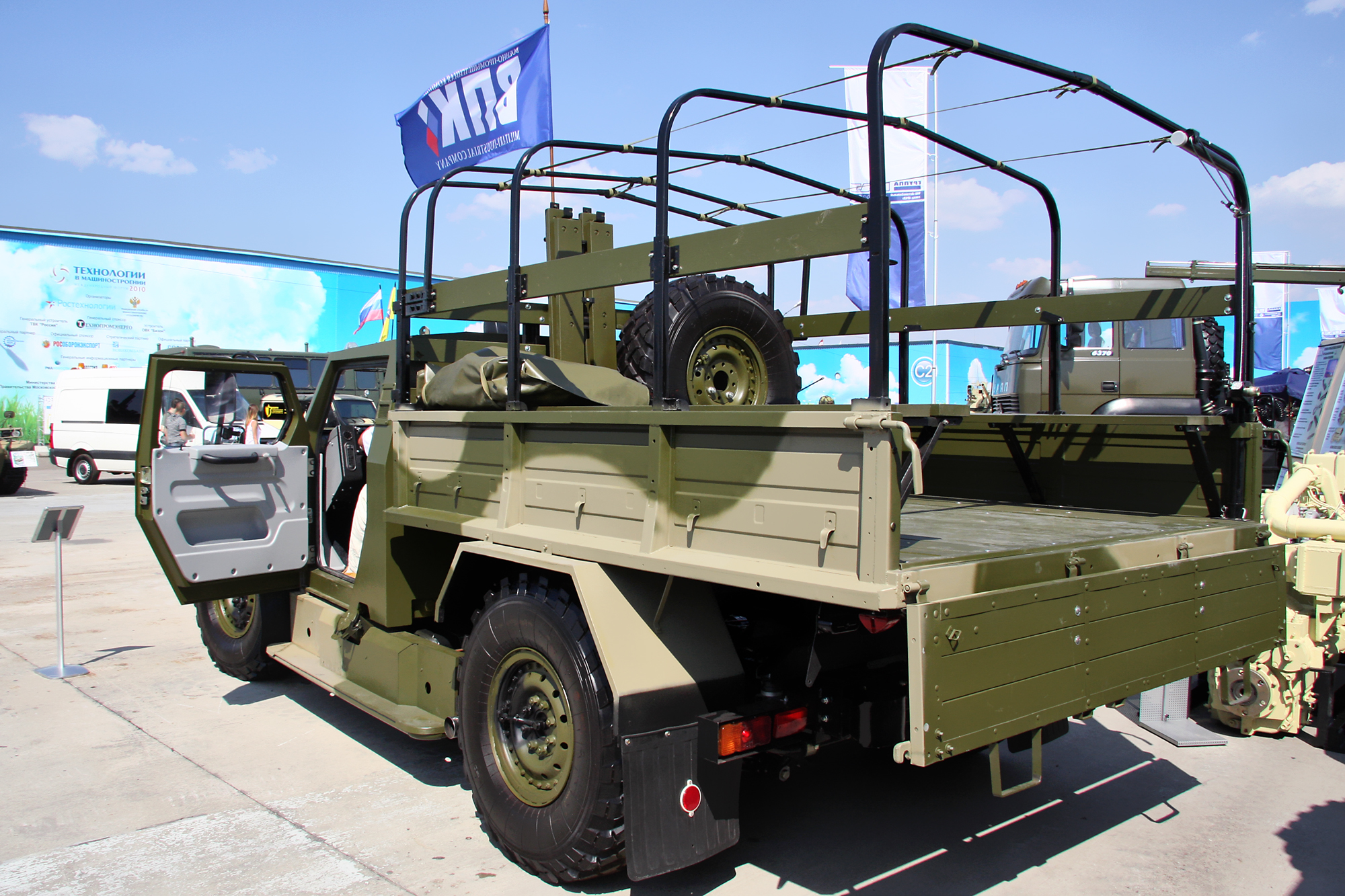
Suspension is in the lowest position
- VPK-39273 Volk-3 — 6x6 vehicle with protected cabin and separate functional rear module.
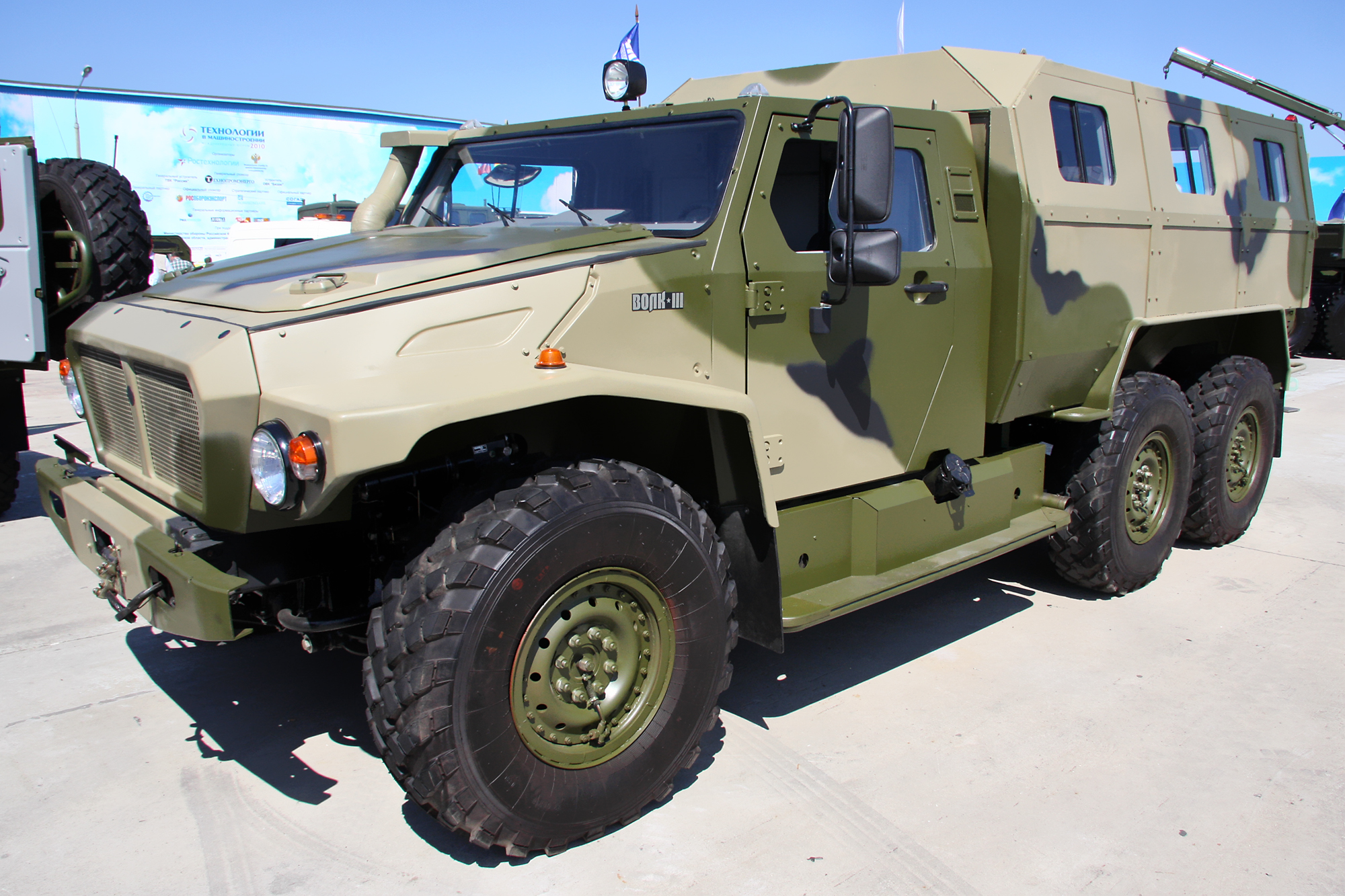
VPK-39273 side view. Unified hauling winch is mounted in front of the vehicle

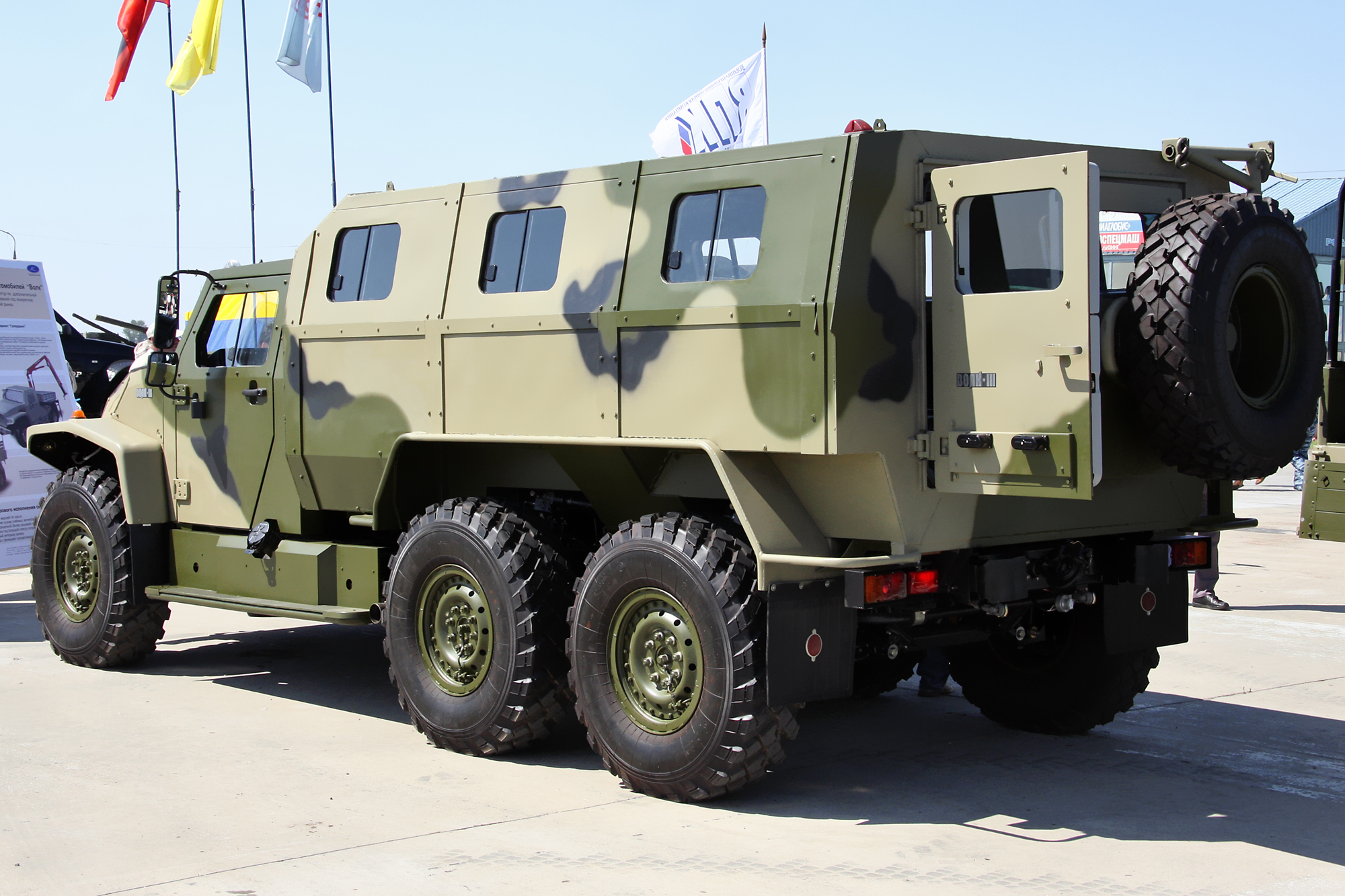
6x6 chassis was made by base chassis extension

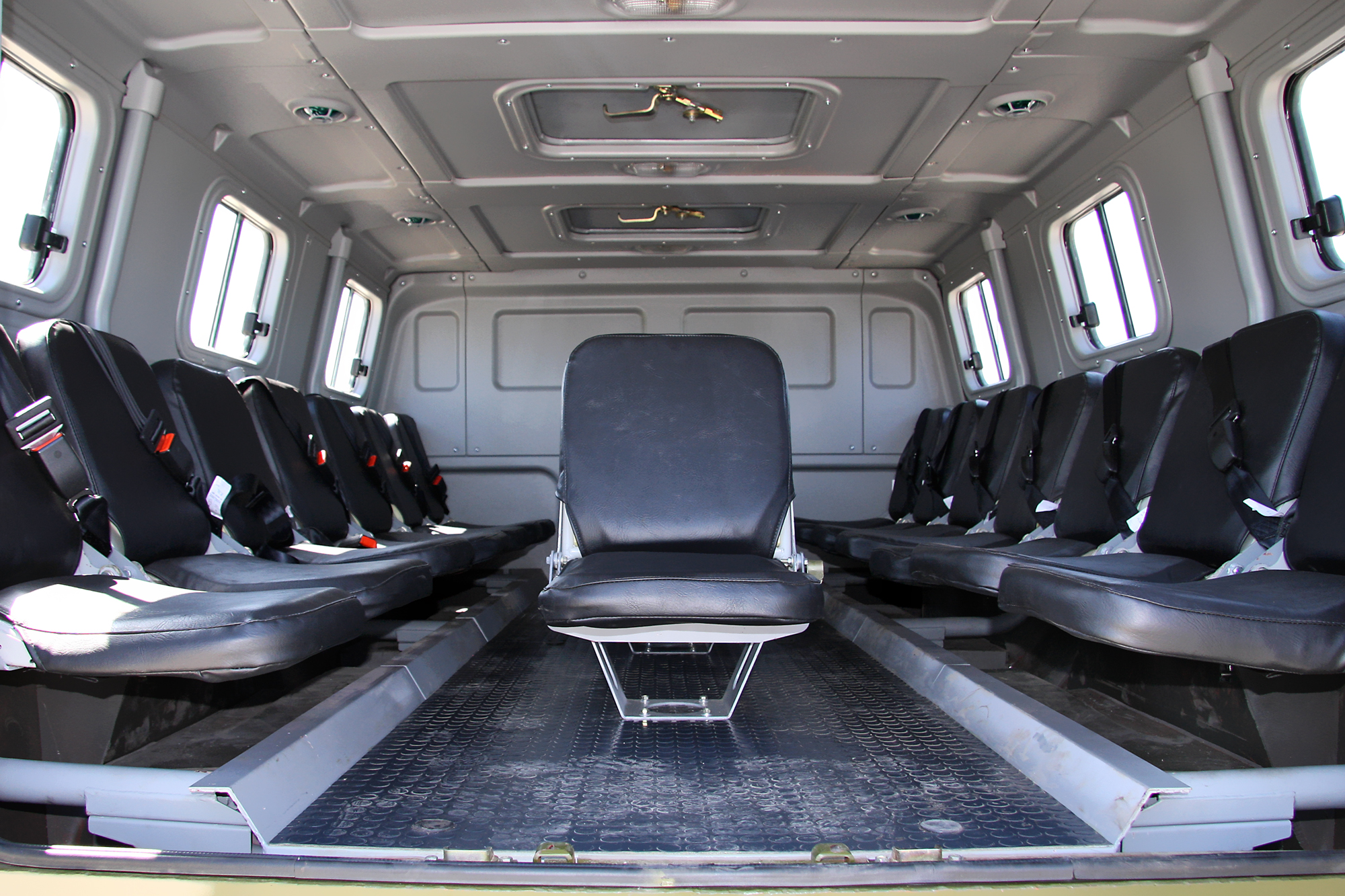
6x6 troop module
- MIC-39274 "Volk-4" — 6x6 MRAP

=== Current operators ===
- Russia

== See also ==
=== Similar vehicles ===
- GAZ Tigr – (Russia)
- GAZ Vodnik – (Russia)
- Didgori-2 – (Georgia)
- Tiuna – (Venezuela)
- Mowag Eagle – (Switzerland)
- ATF Dingo – (Germany)
- Humvee – (United States)
- URO VAMTAC – (Spain)
- Iveco LMV – (Italy)
