= Administrative address =

Administrative address (Russian: Административный адрес) is a legal term (phrase) that is not defined in the legislation of the Russian Federation, much like the term legal address. An administrative address serves as a method for registering the location of a legal entity; it complies with Russian legal requirements while not mandating that the entity's actual operations take place at the registered location. Instead of the legal entity itself being physically present at the registered address, a qualified company representative is stationed there, and the office functions as a point of contact for interactions with external organizations.

== Reasons for the emergence ==
Providing the location of an executive body is a requirement under Russian law. Since the enactment of legislation concerning the accuracy of state registries, a formal procedure for monitoring registered legal addresses has been in place. A discrepancy between a registered legal address and the actual physical location is considered the submission of inaccurate information. This carries administrative liability under Clause 1, Article 25 of Federal Law No. 129-FZ, as well as Parts 4 and 5 of Article 14.25 of the Code of Administrative Offenses of the Russian Federation. The "administrative address" registration model allows a company to remain compliant with the law while enabling its staff to work remotely.

An administrative address enables regulatory bodies to locate a legal entity. None of the offices used for administrative address registrations appear on official lists of mass registration address.

== See also ==
- Official mail
- Propiska
- Resident registration in Russia
