= Types of legal entities in Russia =

Russian businesses may have one of several types of legal status. A business may operate as a limited liability company, or as a public or private joint-stock company, or may be run by a sole proprietor. Other types of commercial and non-commercial organizations are also recognized.

== Limited liability company (LLC) ==
- OOO, Russian: Общество с ограниченной ответственностью

LLC is set up by one or several persons (legal entities and/or individuals), its charter capital is divided into participatory shares, and LLC participants are not liable for company's obligations and bear the risk of losses to the extent of the contributions made by them. The number of shareholders may not exceed 50.

LLC is the most popular legal entity because of simple registration and simplified taxation. LLC can be registered within 3 business days after submitting the documents. In most cases LLCs are eligible for simplified taxation: 15 per cent profits tax or 6 per cent income tax.

== Private joint-stock company ==
- ZAO, Russian: Закрытое акционерное общество, ЗАО

In a PrivJSC shares are distributed only among its founders or another predetermined group of persons. A closed company has the right to conduct a closed subscription to its shares, while the shareholders of a closed company have a pre-emptive right to purchase shares sold by other company shareholders. The number of company's shareholders should not exceed 50.

== Public joint-stock company ==
- OAO, Russian: Открытое акционерное общество, ОАО

An open company has the right to conduct open subscription to its shares – among an unlimited group of persons and closed subscription (a limited predetermined group of persons), if the opportunity to conduct a closed subscription is not limited by company's charter or legal acts. Shareholders do not have a pre-emptive right to purchase shares sold by other shareholders of the company. The number of shareholders is unlimited.

== Other status ==
- Individual entrepreneur (IP, Russian: Индивидуальный предприниматель)
- Autonomous nonprofit organization (ANO, Russian: Автономная некоммерческая организация, АНО)
- Unitary state enterprise (GP or GUP, Russian: Государственное унитарное предприятие, ГП or ГУП)
- Investment fund (Russian: Фонд, "fund")
- Production Cooperative (PK, Russian: Производственный кооператив, ПK)
- Political party (PP, Russian: Политическая партия, ПП)

== See also ==
- Unified State Register of Legal Entities
