= Vodnik (Russian military vehicle) =

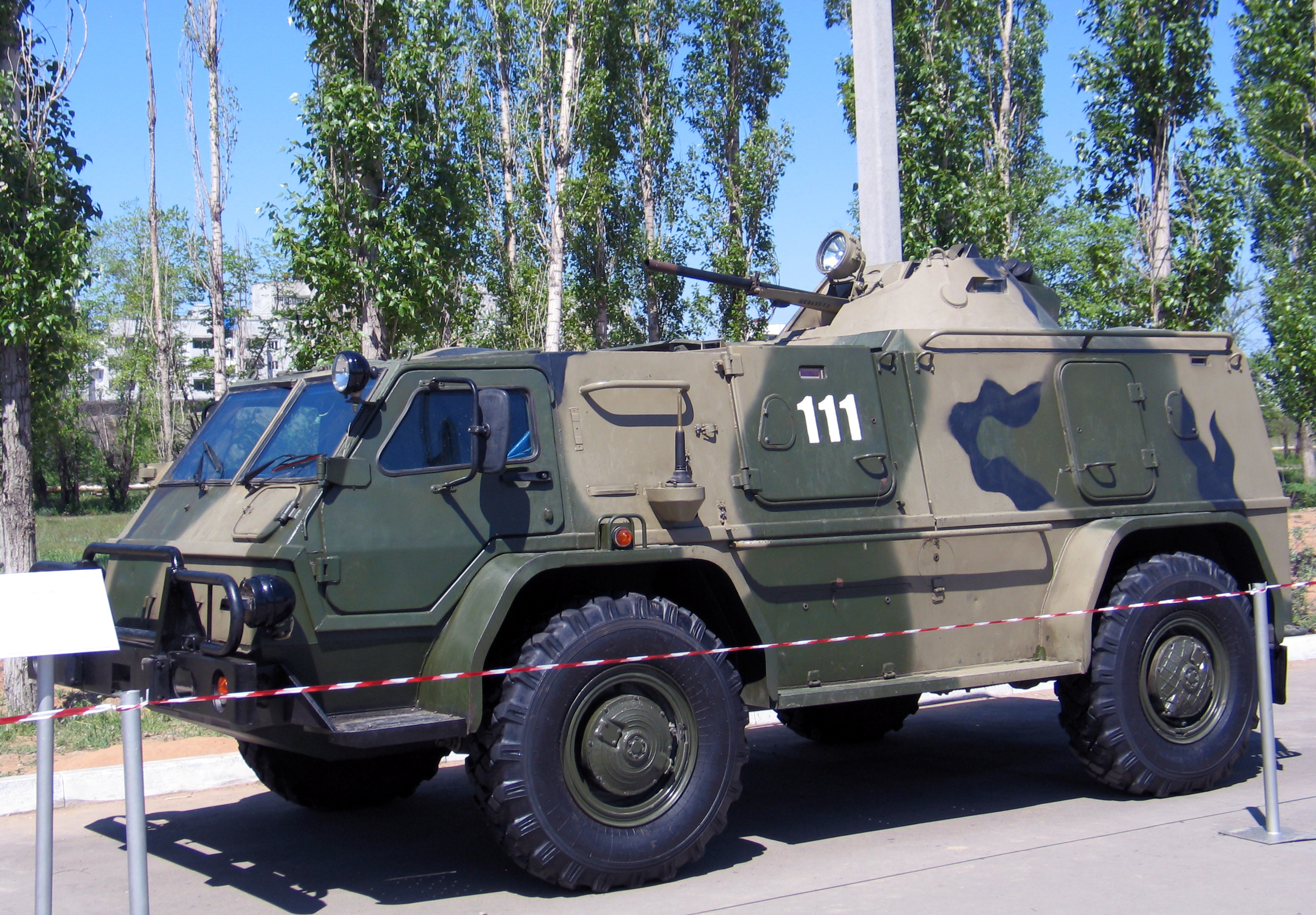
- GAZ-39371 "Vodnik" armored fighting vehicle on the military exhibition on the 65 anniversary of Kapustin Yar missile range, Znamensk, Russia
- Type: Infantry mobility vehicle
- Place of origin: Russia

Service history
- In service: 2005–present
- Wars: Russo-Georgian War; Syrian Civil War; Russo-Ukrainian War

Production history
- Designer: Military Industrial Company
- Designed: 1998

Specifications
- Mass: 7,500 kg
- Length: 5.8 m
- Width: 2.6 m
- Height: 2.6 m
- Crew: 2
- Armor: withstands small arms fire, enemy mines and shells' shrapnel
- Main armament: 1* 14.5 mm KPVT heavy machine gun
- Secondary armament: 1* 7.62 mm PKT machine gun
- Engine: diesel 175 hp (130 kW)
- Power/weight: 26 hp/1000 kg
- Suspension: torsion bar
- Operational range: 800 km
- Maximum speed: 120 km/h

Vodnik (Russian: Водник; Automotive number GAZ-3937 and its modified version GAZ-39371) is a Russian high-mobility multipurpose military vehicle manufactured by GAZ. It is a "heavy modification" of the civil GAZ-2330 "Tigr". Its name comes from the Russian "водник" – a person employed in water transport, but is also used to refer to some person or object simply related to water.

The Vodnik was adopted by the Russian Armed Forces.

== Description ==
This vehicle is amphibious, and uses its wheels to propel itself when afloat. It has a water-displacing hermetic hull which provides improved fording performance and a 4x4-type chassis with independent suspension and a centralized system of tire-pressure control. The ground clearance is 475 mm. The standard undercarriage with a cab can be fitted with a number of different modules with various number of passenger seats and cargo compartments, seating up to 10 people. It is powered by a 175 hp (130 kW) diesel engine giving a top speed of 112 km/h (4 to 5 km/h when swimming).

The car is built on a modular scheme. Welded body includes two removable modules. Front module consists of a power department and management, divided sealed bulkhead.

The rear multi-module due to the quick release coupling can be replaced in the field. In other words, a single chassis can perform several functions, depending on the installed modules:

- transportation of people;
- freight handling and processing equipment in remote areas;
- transportation of residential units and other utilities modules;
- perform the functions of technological machines fuel and energy complex (tankers, containers, etc.).

The vehicle has a switchable front wheel drive, independent torsion bar suspension, central tire inflation system, power steering and a powerful system for heating and air conditioning.

== Armament ==
The Vodnik may be fitted with the same BPU-1 turret, designed in late 1970s, as the BTR-80 on the top of the vehicle towards the rear. The turret is fitted with the 14.5 mm KPV heavy machine gun and 7.62 mm PKT coaxial light machine gun. The main gun is not stabilized (neither in the BTR-80 nor the BTR-80A), so accurate fire on the move is limited (to low speeds), and the rotation mechanism is manually operated. In some cases, it is fitted with a BPPU turret with a 30-mm 2A72 and a PKT. The gunner sits in a roof mounted chair located above the flat floor behind the driver/commander and two passengers, and before the passenger bench. The gunner's station is basic, but uncharacteristically spacious for a Soviet-designed armored vehicle. The gunner is equipped with daytime sight. There are six 902V "Tucha" 81 mm smoke grenade launchers mounted on the rear of the turret.

== History ==
The distant ancestor of GAZ-3937 "Vodnik" is floating car under the symbol NAMI-0281, of which the design begun in 1985. Though, this car had a completely different layout. The compartment of the power unit was located in the rear of the vehicle and the cargo compartment was housed in the middle. This solution made it possible to maintain a trim while afloat, almost regardless of the load. The modern GAZ-3937 has retained almost nothing from its predecessor. NAMI-0281 itself has some resemblance to the BRDM.

== Versions ==
Vodnik is available in two versions.

- GAZ-3937 - the driver and passenger sit one behind the other on the left side of the vehicle and to their right is the power plant.
- GAZ-39371 - nose pushed forward for the wheel arches. And the driving compartment seats three: a driver and a passenger - one after the other as before, and the second passenger - the right of the driver.
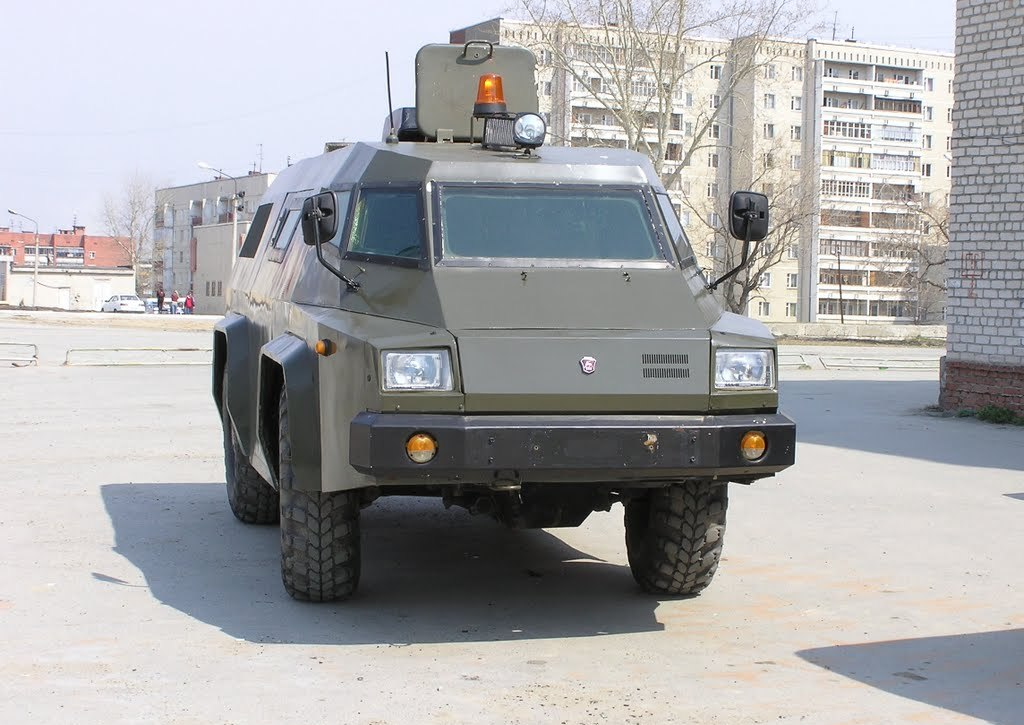
GAZ Vodnik in 2006.

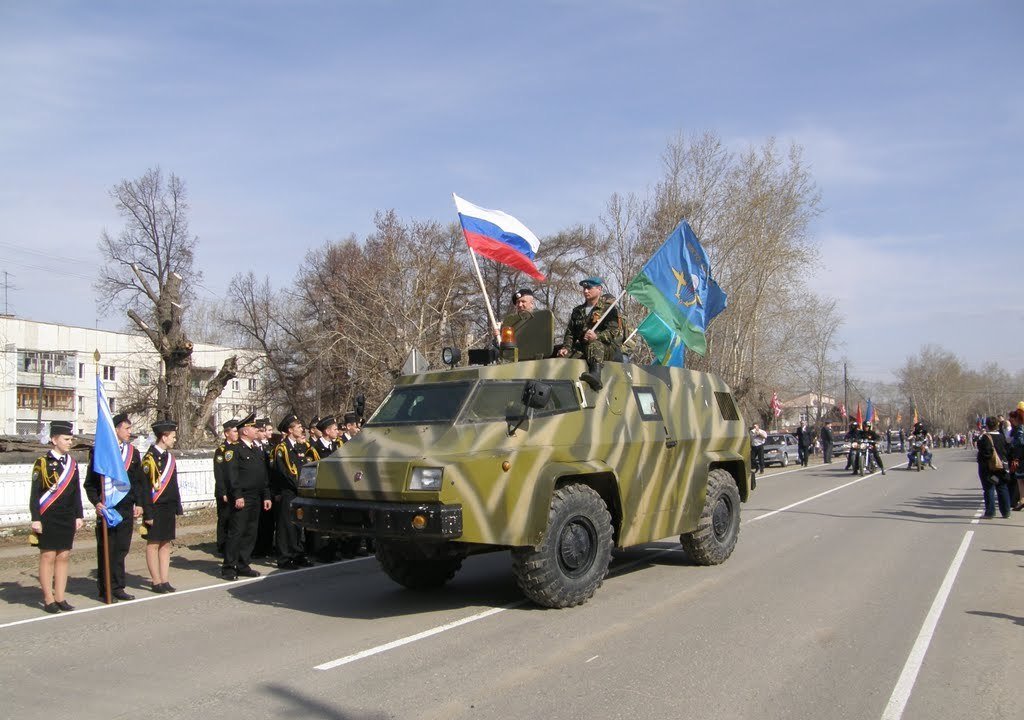
GAZ Vodnik in 2009.

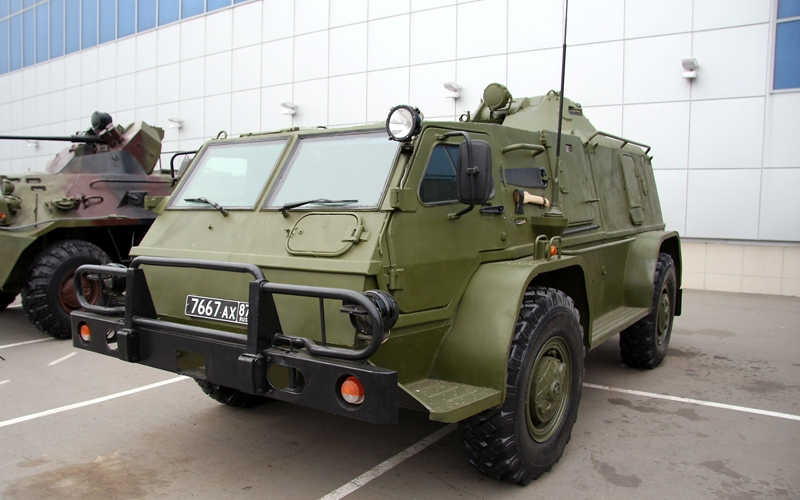
GAZ-39371.

== Operators ==
- Russia
- Syria
- Uruguay – 48 GAZ-39371 "Vodnik" delivered in 2006
- Ukraine
  - A GAZ-3937 "Vodnik" was reportedly used by the Luhansk People's Republic in 2015 in Krasnodon.
  - A GAZ-3937 "Vodnik" was captured by Ukrainian armed forces during Russia's invasion of Ukraine. It was last seen operating with UAF in action near Bakhmut in February 2023.

== Specifications ==
- Vehicle Weight (total), kg: 6600-7500
- Payload, kg: 1500-2500
- Number of passengers: 6
- Length, mm: 5800
- Width, mm: 2600
- Height, mm: 2630
- Wheelbase, mm: 3000
- Track, mm: 2200
- Ground clearance, mm: 475
- Engine: GAZ-5621 6-cyl. 128.7 kW/175 hp turbodiesel
- Rab. volume, cm³: 3200
- Weight: 310 kg
- Speed: 120 km/h
- Cruising range, km: 700-1000

== See also ==
- GAZ-2330 – civil original
- GAZ-2975 "Tigr" – military armour vehicle
