= Propiska =

Propiska may refer to:

- Propiska in the Soviet Union, a written residency permit and a migration-recording tool, in the Russian Empire before 1917 and in the Soviet Union from the 1930s
- Resident registration in Russia, the system from 1993 that records the residence and internal migration of Russian citizens, known colloquially as propiska
- Propiska in Ukraine
