= Arzamas Machine-Building Plant =

Russian military manufacturer

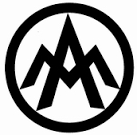

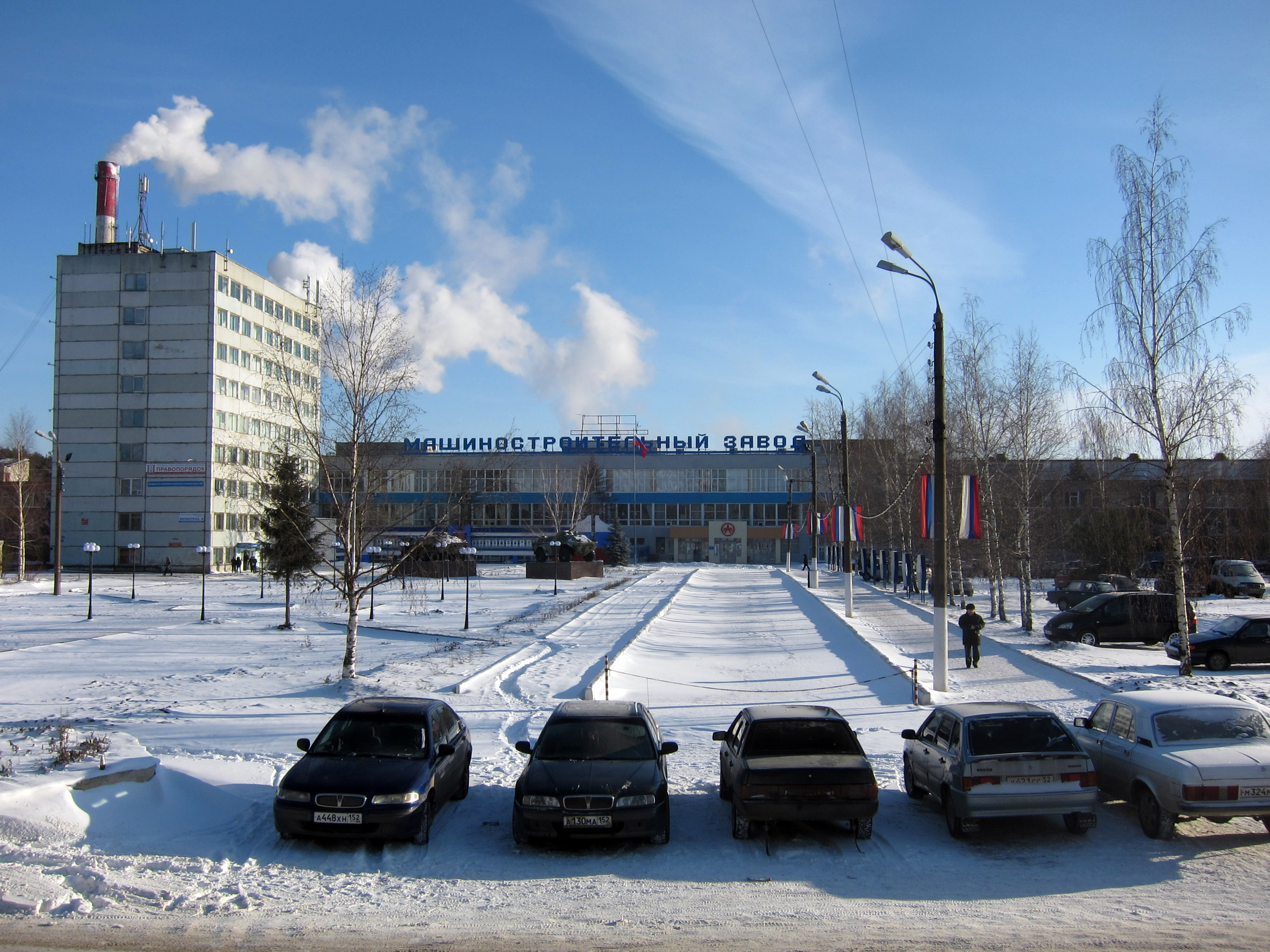
- Native name: Russian: Арзамасский машиностроительный завод
- Company type: Division
- Industry: Mechanical engineering
- Founded: 1972; 54 years ago
- Headquarters: Russia
- Area served: Worldwide
- Products: All-terrain vehicles
- Parent: Military Industrial Company

The Arzamas Machine‑Building Plant (Russian: Арзамасский машиностроительный завод) is a manufacturing enterprise located in Arzamas, Russia. Founded in 1972, it forms part of the Military Industrial Company group.

The plant is responsible for assembling the BTR‑80 armoured personnel carrier, the Tigr 4×4 multipurpose all‑terrain infantry mobility vehicle, and a range of civilian vehicles built on the same chassis.
