= Unified State Register of Legal Entities =

The Unified State Register of Legal Entities (Russian: Единый государственный реестр юридических лиц, abbreviated ЕГРЮЛ / EGRUL) is centralized official database of legal entities in the Russian Federation, including companies and other organizations established under Russian law. It records key information about each legal entity, such as its registered name, legal address, founders or participants, management, registration details, and liquidation status. It is used by government authorities, businesses, courts, banks, and other parties to verify a company's legal existence and registration information.

== History ==
After the dissolution of the Soviet Union in December 1991, Russia's entity-registration system was fragmented. Different public authorities and local administrations maintained registration records, and there was no single, comprehensive federal register equivalent to today's EGRUL. The earlier system involved several types of records and authorities such as regional and municipal registration authorities. Depending on the legal form and location, companies could be registered by local administrations, regional authorities, or specialized registration bodies, such as Moscow's Registration Chamber (Russian: Московская регистрационная палата) which was established by the Mossovet and the Government of Moscow. While tax authorities maintained taxpayer information, tax registration and the legal registration of a company were not yet integrated into the same unified state register. An important part of this system was the network of registration chambers, particularly in major cities and regions. These chambers were not one unified national institution. They were separate bodies operating under the applicable registration rules, often established by regional or municipal authorities. Their responsibilities included registering newly established companies, recording amendments to their founding documents, and issuing registration certificates.

The transition was governed principally by Federal Law No. 129-FZ of 8 August 2001, which entered into force on 1 July 2002. Government Resolution No. 319 of 17 May 2002 designated the Ministry of Taxes and Levies as the authorized registration authority. Following its establishment, registration chambers were liquidated.

== Contents of the register ==
The register contains:

- Entries regarding the full and (if applicable) abbreviated name, as well as the trade name, of a credit institution in Russian and (if applicable) in a foreign language;
- Entry regarding the legal form;
- Entries regarding the registered legal address;
- Entries regarding the founders or participants of the legal entity;
- Entry regarding the amount of the authorized capital;
- Entry regarding the person authorized to act on behalf of the legal entity without a power of attorney;
- Entries regarding existing licenses;
- Entries regarding branches and representative offices;
- Entries regarding state registration upon the creation, reorganization, or liquidation of legal entities;
- Entries regarding the state registration of amendments made to the constituent documents of legal entities;
- Entries regarding changes to information contained in the state register, including those made to correct errors committed by the registering authority;
- Documents submitted to the registering authority.

== Procedure for Maintaining the Register and Accessing Data ==
Entries in the Unified State Register of Legal Entities are made in chronological order. Each entry is assigned a state registration number (Russian: ГРН). For each legal entity, the first entry in the EGRUL is designated as its Primary State Registration Number (Russian: ОГРН).

The register is maintained in both paper and electronic formats. In the event of a discrepancy between the paper-based records and the electronic records, the paper-based records take precedence.

With the exception of certain personal data concerning individuals, the information and documents contained in the EGRUL are open and publicly accessible.

Upon the request of an interested party, the registering authority is required to provide information and documents contained in the EGRUL in the form of:

- an extract from the state register;
- a copy of a document (or documents) contained in the state register;
- a certificate confirming the absence of the requested information.
- An extract from the register must be provided no later than 5 days from the date the relevant request is received, in a format prescribed by law.

Extracts from the EGRUL are provided free of charge to government authorities and to the legal entity itself; for all other parties, a fee applies.

An extract from the EGRUL may be required for carrying out certain legally significant actions. Information from the register can also be accessed publicly via the Internet; however, such information does not carry the same legal weight as a formally issued extract. An extract from the EGRUL obtained through the official website of the Federal Taxation Service holds legal validity and is equivalent to a paper-based extract signed by a tax authority official and authenticated with an official seal.

== See also ==
- Types of legal entities in Russia
- Types of business entity in Russia
- Administrative address
- Mass registration address
- Resident registration in Russia
