= Military Industrial Company =

Russian manufacturer of armored military vehicles

Military Industrial Company LLC
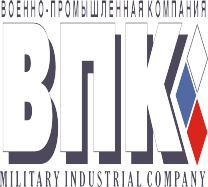
- Native name: Russian: ООО Военно-промышленная компания
- Company type: Subsidiary
- Industry: Mechanical engineering
- Founded: July 31, 2006; 19 years ago
- Headquarters: Moscow, Central, Russia
- Area served: Worldwide
- Key people: Sergey Vasyutin (CEO)
- Products: All-terrain vehicles
- Number of employees: 6000
- Parent: Arzamas Machine-Building Plant
- Divisions: Arzamas Machine-Building Plant

Military Industrial Company LLC (ООО Военно-промышленная компания (ВПК) or Voyenno-promyshlennaya kompaniya VPK) is a Russian industrial company. It was founded in 2006. The headquarters are located in Moscow. Military Industrial Company produces and sells wheeled and tracked all-terrain vehicles for a variety of purposes.

== History ==
The company was founded on July 31, 2006 by Russian Machines. It included the following enterprises:

- Arzamas Machine-Building Plant (Arzamas),
- Zavolzhsky plant of tracked towing vehicles (Zavolzhye),
- Hull Plant (Vyksa).

In December, 2011 Russian Machines sold its shares in the Military Industrial Company to Arzamas Machine-Building Plant.

== Management ==
The managing company is located in Moscow. Its aims include sales, supplement and general management.

The CEO is Sergey Vasyutin according to the Unified State Register of Legal Entities.

== Performance indicators ==
The company employs 6000 people (2017).

Military Industrial Company supplies various types of multi-purpose wheeled and tracked ATVs for Russian public and private entities.

== Production ==
Military Industrial Company is one of the largest producers of wheeled armored vehicles in the world. Military Industrial Company produces a wide range of military vehicles, including:

- 233115 Tigr—M SpN, special purpose vehicle
- SBM VPK-233136 Tigr, special armored vehicle
- AMN 233114 Tigr—M, multi-purpose vehicle
- BMA Tigr, medical armored vehicle
- SPM-3 VPK-3924 Medved, special police vehicle
- VPK-3927 Volk, multi-purpose armored vehicle
- VPK-Ural, multipurpose vehicle
- BTR-80, combat wheeled amphibious vehicle
- BTR-80A, armored transporter
- BTR-80K, command armored transporter
- BTR-82А, armored transporter
- 59037, all-terrain amphibious vehicle
- BREM—K, armored recovery vehicle
