= Mass registration address =

Mass registration address (Russian: Адрес массовой регистрации) is an unofficial term used in the Russian Federation to refer to the registered location of a legal entity's sole executive body, the address used for official communication, as recorded in the Unified State Register of Legal Entities, in cases where this same address is also listed as the location for the sole executive bodies of other legal entities.

== History ==
Before the establishment of the Unified State Register of Legal Entities in the Russian Federation (on July 1, 2002), the state registration of legal entities was handled by various authorities, including local government bodies. For a long time, registration was conducted in accordance with the "Regulation on the Procedure for State Registration of Business Entities". Although this Regulation contained no such requirements, some Russian regions and localities demanded information regarding a so-called "legal address"—a concept not defined under Russian law, yet one that became common usage. In certain areas, authorities required documentation—such as proof of ownership, a lease agreement, or other legal rights—to verify the property address submitted for a legal entity's registration. Despite the unlawful nature of these demands, complying with them became standard practice; in some regions, this persisted even after the enactment of Federal Law No. 129-FZ of August 8, 2001, "On the State Registration of Legal Entities".

== Overview ==
Although Russian law does not require any formal verification of the address where a legal entity's sole executive body is located for the purpose of state registration, a persistent stereotype remains: many believe that the registered address must be substantiated by specific supporting documentation. Under these circumstances, applicants—often following the "advice" of so-called "legal firms" that provide state registration services—may specify an address in their registration filings that was provided by the registration firm or another third party. This address does not correspond to the actual location of the legal entity's sole executive body—the place where that body can be reached. Providing an inaccurate address for the sole executive body is also a common practice in the creation of so-called "shell companies" (or "fly-by-night" firms).

As a result, the Unified State Register of Legal Entities has come to contain a significant number of entries for organizations that share the same address for their sole executive bodies. In common parlance, such an address is referred to as a "mass registration address."

== Consequences ==
The mere fact that several legal entities share the same address for their sole executive bodies does not, in itself, trigger any legal consequences. However, the identification of a "mass registration address" does lead to increased scrutiny from regulatory authorities—most notably the tax authorities—regarding the organizations in question.

If it is determined that the sole executive body of a legal entity cannot be reached at the address provided in the Unified State Register of Legal Entities, this may indicate that inaccurate information about the entity was submitted, or that the entity failed to fulfill its statutory obligation—stipulated in Clause 5, Article 5 of Federal Law No. 129-FZ of August 8, 2001, "On the State Registration of Legal Entities and Individual Entrepreneurs"—to notify the registration authority within three days of any changes to the information contained in the Unified State Register of Legal Entities. Liability for failure to submit, late submission, or the submission of inaccurate information regarding a legal entity to the authority responsible for the state registration of legal entities is established under Part 3 of Article 14.25 of the Code of Administrative Offenses of the Russian Federation.

Lists of mass registration addresses—along with the legal entities associated with them—are widely used by commercial organizations (primarily banks, leasing companies, insurance firms, etc.) to vet potential counterparties when preparing to enter into transactions. Any party can check whether an organization is linked to a mass registration address by using the official website of the Federal Tax Service.

== See also ==
- Resident registration in Russia
